= Kethureddipatti =

Village Panchayat

- Village Panchayat
- Location in Dharmapuri, Tamil Nadu, India
- Coordinates: 12.08°N 78.28°E
- Country: India
- State: Tamil Nadu
- Region: Kongu Nadu
- District: Dharmapuri
- Taluk: Pappireddipatti
- Block: Kadathur

Government
  - Type: Village Panchayat
  - President: Tmt. Kalpana Sambath
  - Secretary: Mr. Ravi

Population (2011)
  - Total: 4,808

Languages
  - Official: Tamil
- Time zone: UTC+5:30 (IST)
- PIN: 635302
- Telephone code: 91-4346
- Vehicle registration: TN 29
- Nearest city: Dharmapuri
- Lok Sabha Constituency: Dharmapuri
- Assembly Constituency: Pappireddipatti
- Nearest Town: Kadathur, Bommidi

Kethureddipatti is a Village Panchayat in Dharmapuri district of Tamil Nadu, India. It is located at 30 km (19 mi) from Dharmapuri town. It comes under Pappireddipatti taluk and Kadathur Block. It belongs to Pappireddipatti State Legislative Assembly Constituency and Dharmapuri Loksabha Constituency. It consists of nine panchayat wards. As per the 2011 Census, the total population of this village is 4,808.

== Geography ==
Kethureddipatti is situated 32 kilometres (20 mi) south of Dharmapuri. It is in the southern region of the district. It is surrounded by Kavaramalai RF in the southeast and Vathalmalai Hills in the northwest.

== Demographics ==
As per the 2011 census of India, the Kethureddipatti Village has population of 4,808 out of which male population is 2,456 while female population is 2,352. Literacy rate of kettureddipatty village is 64.43% out of which 73.62% males and 54.85% females are literate.

== Transport ==
Kethureddipatti has both government and private bus connectivity with Bommidi, Kadathur, Pappireddipatti, Harur, Dharmapuri.

=== Road ===
Kethureddipatti is situated 10 km (6.2 mi) from both the Bommidi and Kadathur bus stand. From thereon buses to Chennai, Kovai, Salem, Harur, Dharmapuri etc. operated on timely and daily basis by both Tamil Nadu State Transport Corporation (TNSTC) and private transports.

=== Trains ===
There are three nearby railway stations available, Bommidi, Morappur and Buddireddipatti. Both Bommidi and Morappur has train connectivity with Chennai, Salem, Coimbatore, Tirupati, Kerala etc. through express and superpast express trains. Buddireddipatti has passenger train connectivity only.

=== Airport ===
Nearest airport: Salem Airport, is 47 km from Kethureddipatti, Coimbatore Airport to Kethureddipatti 218 km, Bangalore Airport to Kethureddipatti 190 Km, Chennai Airport to Kethureddipatti 282 km.

== Political and Revenue administration ==
The Kethureddipatti Village Panchayat has

1. One Village Panchayat President
2. One ward Councillor
3. 9 ward representatives.

=== Habitations ===
1. Anna Nagar
2. Dharmalingam Kottai
3. Kali Kottai
4. Kanapathi Kottai
5. Kethureddipatti
6. Muttaikkannan Kottai
7. Savulukkottai
8. Sengan Nagar
9. Sinnoor
10. Pudhukuttaiyan Kottai
11. Perisu Kottai
12. Veppilaipatti

== Public utilities ==
=== Education ===
Kethureddipatti panchyat consists of one

1. Government High School, Kethureddipatti
2. Government Middle School, Veppilaipatti
3. Government Primary School, Kethureddipatti.Nearby Schools are
1. Government Higher Secondary School, Buddireddipatti
2. Government Higher Secondary School, Nathamedu
3. Government Higher Secondary School, Kadathur
4. Government Higher Secondary School, Bommidi
5. Annai India Matric Higher Secondary School, Bommidi
6. AMG Matric Higher Secondary School, Bommidi
7. Sri Vinayaga Vidhyalaya Matric Higher Secondary School, Sillarahalli
8. Achievers Academy, Sungarahalli,
9. Greenpark CBSE School, Kadathur
10. Kalaimagal Matric Higher Secondary School, Kadathur
11. Swamy Vivekanandha Matric Higher Secondary School, Kadathur.

Nearby Colleges

1. Government Polytechnic College, Kadathur
2. Government Arts College, Pappireddipatti
3. Government Arts & Science College, Dharmapuri
4. Government Engineering College, Settikarai, Dharmapuri
5. Government Medical College & Hospital, Dharmapuri

=== Government hospitals ===
Nearby government hospitals are

- Primary Health Center, Kadathur
- Primary Health Center, Bommidi
- Primary Health Center, Ramiyenahalli

=== Banks ===
Nearby banks are

- Cooperative Bank, Talanatham
- Indian Bank, Sillarahalli,
- Indian Bank, Kadathur,
- Indian Bank, Bommidi,
- State Bank of India, Kadathur,
- Canera Bank, Bommidi
- Tamilnadu Mercantile Bank, Bommidi.

=== Government offices ===
It has a Village Administrative Office at Kethureddipatti which maintains the records of revenue, patta/chitta details of the Kethureddipatti Revenue Village

=== Registrar Office ===
Nearby sub-registrar office is located at Kadathur.

=== Post office ===
Kethureddipatti has one Sub-Post office which has a branch office at Buddireddipatti.

=== Common Service Center (CSC) ===
It has two common service centers (CSC) at kethureddipatti. Nearby CSC Center is located at Talanatham.

=== Police service ===
Kethureddipatti comes under the Kadathur C-3 Police Station Circle. Another nearby Police Station is C-6 Police Station, Nadur, Bommidi.

== See also ==
- Kethureddipatti
- Kadathur
- Kadathur block
- Bommidi
- Pappireddipatti
- Dharmapuri
- Dharmapuri District
- கேத்துரெட்டிபட்டி
- கேத்துரெட்டிபட்டி ஊராட்சி
