= Savadiyur, Dharmapuri =

Village in Tamil Nadu, India

Savadiyur சாவடியூர்
- Hamlet / Village
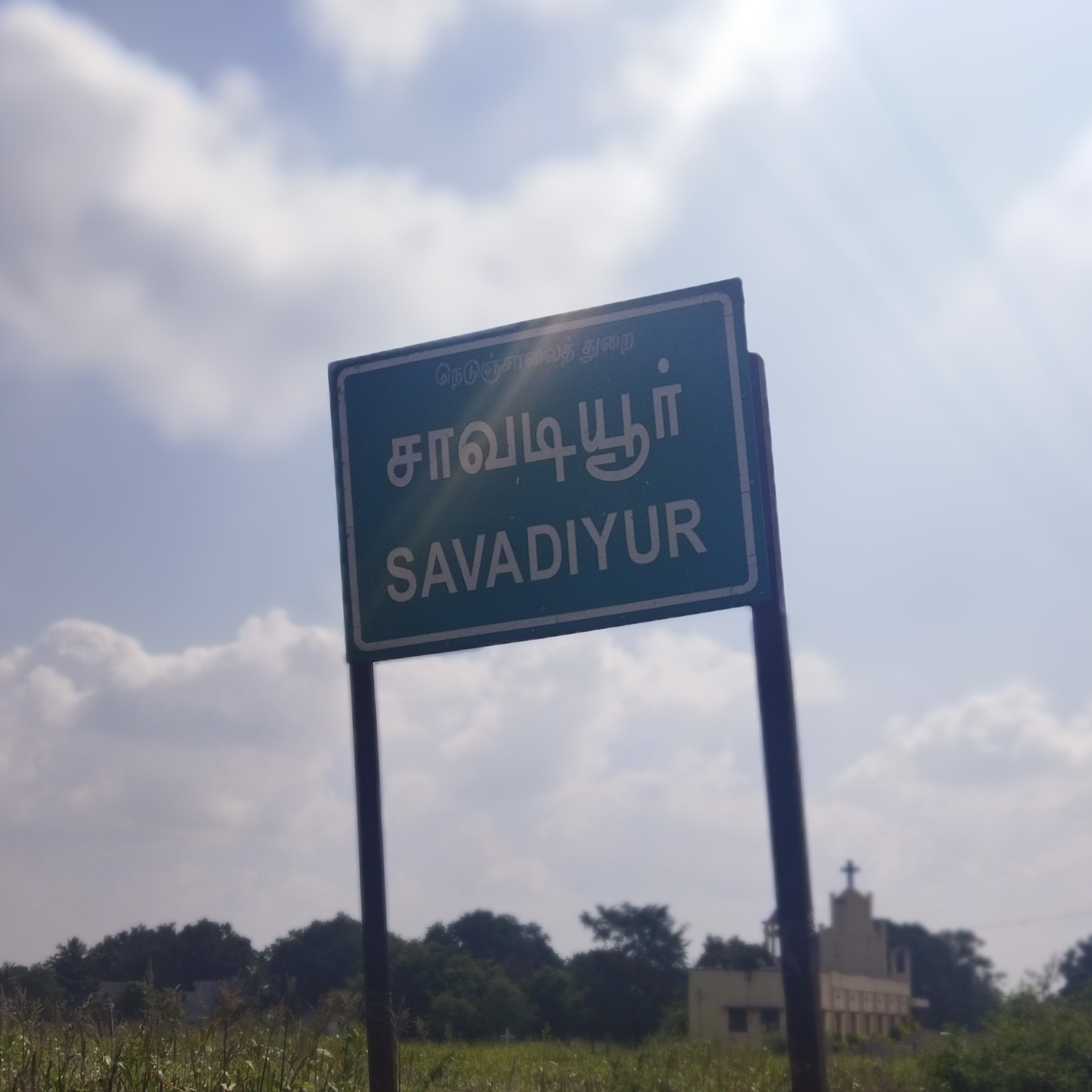
- Road side Sign board of the village

- The location of this village in Tamil Nadu Map
- Coordinates: 12.3102°N 78.1146°E
- Country: India
- State: Tamil Nadu
- Region: Kongu Nadu
- District: Dharmapuri
- Thaluk: Karimangalam
- Block: Karimangalam
- Panchayat: Erraseegalahalli

Population (2011)
  - Total: 93

Languages
  - Official: Tamil
  - Secondary: Telugu
- Time zone: UTC+5:30 (IST)
- PIN: 636808
- Post Office: Kethanahalli
- Telephone code: 91-4348
- Vehicle registration: TN-29
- Lok Sabha Constituency: Dharmapuri
- Lok Sabha Member: S. Senthilkumar
- Assembly Constituency: Dharmapuri
- Assembly Member: Sowmiya Anbumani

Savadiyur is a village 5 km (3.1 mi) east of Palacode, Dharmapuri district, Tamil Nadu, India. This village comes under the Erraseegalahalli Gram panchayat.

== Culture ==
Savadiyur holds a unique cultural identity, heavily influenced by the presence of Catholic missionaries who settled in nearest village Kethanahalli over a century ago. As a result, the village has a notable population of Catholics who actively participate in religious rituals and festivities.
