= Kammalampatty =

- Interactive map of Kammalampatty
- Coordinates: 12.052°N 78.4855°E
- Country: India
- State: Tamil Nadu
- District: Harur
  - Rank: Village
- Elevation: 347 m (1,138 ft)
- Time zone: UTC+5:30 (IST)
- PIN: 636903
- Telephone code: 04346
- Vehicle registration: TN 29 Z

Kammalampatty village is located in Harur Taluk of Dharmapuri district in Tamil Nadu, India. It is situated 5 km away from sub-district headquarter Harur and 46 km away from district headquarter Dharmapuri. As per 2009 stats, Ellapudayampatty is the gram panchayat of Kammalampatty village.

== Geography ==
The village is in northern Tamil Nadu, with an average elevation of 347 meters (1138 feet). The total geographical area of village is 214.71 hectares. Kammalampatty has a total population of 1,301 peoples. There are about 341 houses in Kammalampatty village. Harur is nearest town to Kammalampatty.

=== Special festivals ===
Ther thiruvila is a festival in Kammalampatty village which is conducted every five years in Manavalan temple.

Panguni utthiram is a famous festival in this village which is conducted every year in April.

== Places of interest ==
- Theerthamalai – 11 km (6.8 mi) away
- Vallimadurai Dam – 8 km away
- Sitheri Hills – 21 km (13 mi) away
- Thiruvannamalai temple - 55 km away
- Manavaalan temple - 2 km
- Hanumanthertham - 15 km - Hanuman Temple
- Amman Granites - 3 km

== Rail ==
The nearest railway station is at Morappur, 15 kilometres (9.3 mi) from kammalampatty.

== Mining ==
=== Granite ===
Near kammalapatty Amman granites is rich in high-quality gabbro, which is exported to Europe and North America.
