= G. Arul Murugan =

Judge of Madras High Court in India

G. Arul Murugan is a serving judge of Madras High Court, Tamil Nadu, India

== Early life and education ==
Arul Murugan was born on 27 May 1976 in Salem. His father was Ganapathi and mother was Nilamani. His father worked as the headmaster of a government high school in Harur of Dharmapuri District. Hence he lived in Keeraipatti village in the Harur taluk, Dharmapuri district. Arul Murugan completed his schooling from Sacred Heart Higher Secondary School at Salem. After completion of his schooling, he joined the Central Law College, Salem for a 5-year law degree.

On getting the law degree, he enrolled himself as an advocate in the Bar Council of Tamil Nadu and Puducherry on 22 February 1999. Arul Murugan joined with Senior Advocate K. Duraisamy's office and practiced law with him till 2002. After that he started practicing alone since 2003.

== Judge ==
As advocate Arul Murugan, has appeared in various cases for over 20 years. He has been appointed by the president of India as an Additional Judge of the Madras High Court on 16 October 2023, following the recommendation of the Collegium.
