= Kadathur Block =

Kadathur block is a revenue block in the Dharmapuri district of Tamil Nadu, India. It has a total of 25 panchayat villages.

Panchayat Villages in Kadathur Block include:

1. Basuvapuram
2. Buddireddipatti
3. Chinthalpadi
4. Gopichettipalayam
5. Gurubarahalli
6. Osahalli
7. Karthanur
8. Kethureddipatti
9. Linckanaickanhalli
10. Maniyampadi
11. Mottankuruchi
12. Madathahalli
13. Nallakudalahalli
14. Oblinaickanahalli
15. Ramiyanahalli
16. Regadahalli
17. Sillarahalli
18. Sungarahalli
19. Santhapatti
20. Thalanatham
21. Thathanoor
22. Thenkarikottai
23. Vaguthupatti
24. Venkadatharahalli
25. Puliyampatti
