= Soriyampatti =

- Village
- Location in Tamil Nadu, India Soriyampatti (India)
- Coordinates: 12.09271°N 78.480910°E
- Country: India
- State: Tamil Nadu
- District: Dharmapuri
- Taluk: Harur
  - Rank: Village

Population (2011)
  - Total: 1,197

Languages
  - Official: Tamil
- Time zone: UTC+5:30 (IST)
- PIN: 636902
- Telephone code: 04346

Soriyampatti is a village in Harur Taluk, in Dharmapuri District, in the Tamil Nadu State of India.
