= Bandahalli =

Village in Tamil Nadu, India

Coordinates: 12.084163°N 77.953187°E

Bandahalli is a village in Nallampalli Taluk, Dharmapuri district, Tamil Nadu, India. Bandahalli is 18.5 km from the Taluk's main town, Nallampalli, 23.2 km from the district's administrative headquarters, Dharmapuri, and 272 km (169 mi) from the state capital, Chennai.

== Schools near Bandahalli ==
- The Government Higher Secondary School, Bandahalli, is the only school located in Bandahalli.
- The Government Elementary School, Bandahalli.
- Jayam Narsri Primary School, Pangunatham.

== Colleges near Bandahalli ==
- Jayalakshmi Institute of Technology. Address : Dharmapuri—636 352.
- Marutam Nelli Polytechnic College. Address : Dalavahalli, Nallampalli, Dharmapuri—636 803.
- Christ College of Education for Women. Address : Christ Garden, Collector bungalow back side, A.Jettihalli, Dharmapuri.
- Jayam Institute of Technology. Address : Dharmapuri—636 352

== Villages near Bandahalli ==
- Pangunatham
- Ramarkoodal
- Parapatti
- Echanahalli

== Airports near Bandahalli ==
- Salem Airport - 60 km
- Kempegowda International Airport - 180 km
