= Morappur =

Morappur may refer to:

- Morappur block
- Morappur (state assembly constituency)
- Morappur, Tamil Nadu, a town in the Morappur constituency
