= Kovilur, Dharmapuri =

Kovilur
- Village
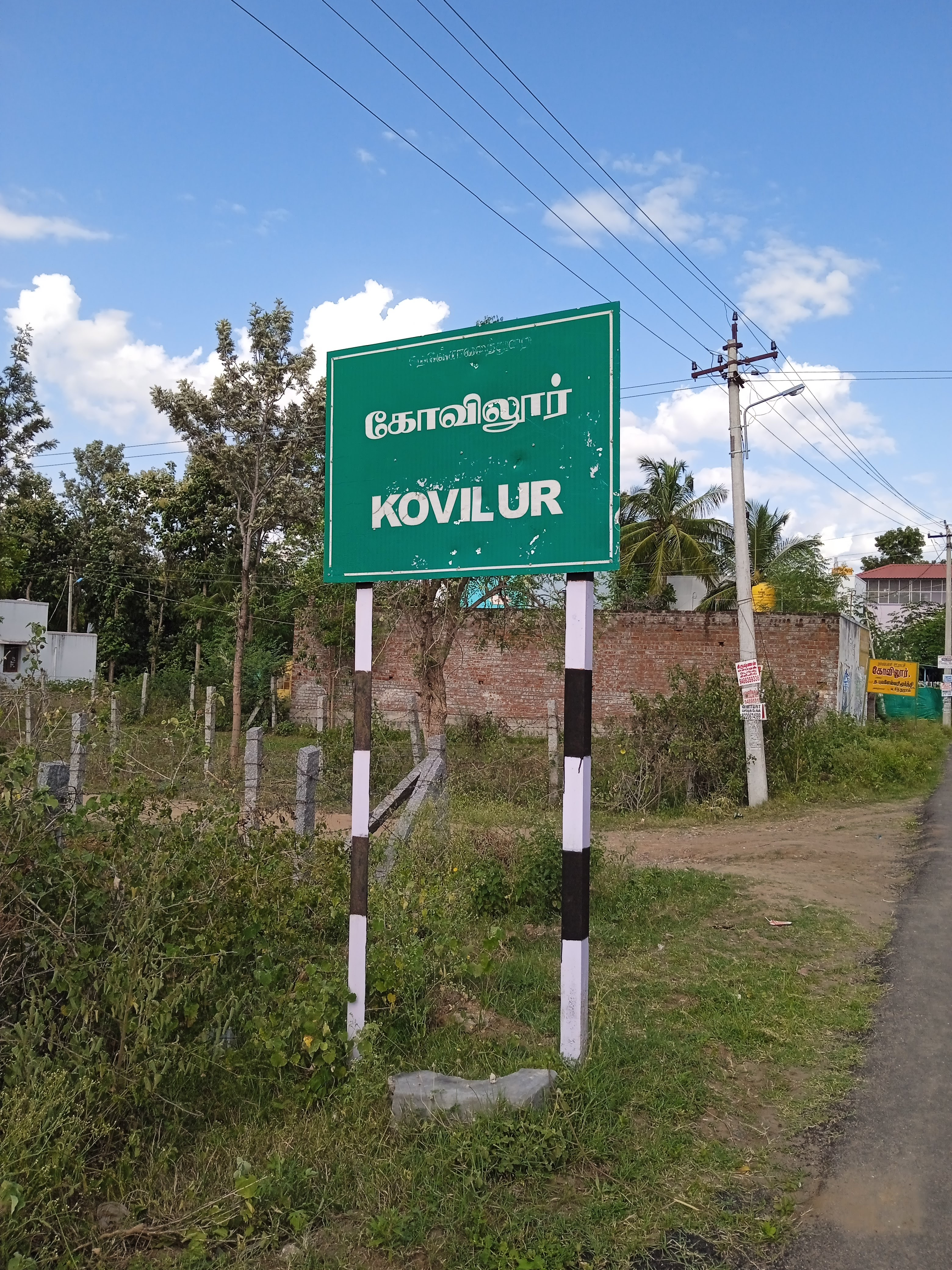
- Road Sign on this Village

- Location of Kovilur in Tamilnadu
- Coordinates: 12.059665°N 78.123130°E
- Country: India
- State: Tamil Nadu
- Region: Kongu Nadu
- District: Dharmapuri
- Taluk: Nallampalli

Government
  - Type: Village
  - Body: Gram panchayat

Languages
  - Official: Tamil
- Time zone: UTC+5:30 (IST)
- PIN: 636807
- Telephone code: 04342
- Vehicle registration: TN-29

Kovilur is a small Village in Nallampalli Block in Dharmapuri district of Tamil Nadu State, India. It comes under Nallampalli Panchayath. It is located 10 km towards South from District headquarters Dharmapuri. 4 km from Nallampalli.

According to catholic missionaries record, this place was called as Bellagoundanahalli and Velliyanpettai, due to temple and church in this village, locals and neighboring villagers start calling this place as Kovilur [Kovil(temple)+Oor(village)].

== Education Institutes ==
- St. Thomas Middle School for Girls, Kovilur
- St. Johns High School, Kovilur
