= Marandahalli =

- Panchayat town
- Location in Tamil Nadu, India
- Coordinates: 12.4°N 78.0°E
- Country: India
- State: Tamil Nadu
- Region: Kongu Nadu
- District: Dharmapuri
- Elevation: 581 m (1,906 ft)

Population (2011)
  - Total: 12,451

Languages
  - Official: Tamil
- Time zone: UTC+5:30 (IST)
- Postal code: 636806

Marandahalli is a panchayat town Dharmapuri district in the Indian state of Tamil Nadu. Located in the northern part of the district.

== Geography ==
Marandahalli is located at 12.4°N 78.0°E. It has an average elevation of 581 metres (1906 feet). Marandahalli is located 40 km from Dharmapuri and 80 km from Bengaluru, 60km from Hosur and 9km from palacode. 10km from Iyyanar kottai. and 15km from Bettamugilalam.

There is also a river called "Sanakumara Nadhi" passing through this small town and that finally joins with Cauvery river at Hogenakkal.

== Demographics ==
As of 2001 India census, Marandahalli had a population of 10,000. Males constitute 50% of the population and females 50%. Marandahaālli has an average literacy rate of 61%, higher than the national average of 59.5%: male literacy is 66%, and female literacy is 55%. In Marandahalli, 12% of the population is under 6 years of age.

== Economy ==
The main industry is farming. More than 50% of land is coconut trees. Other farming activity like paddy, sugarcane, bananas, and tomato are also cultivated. Rainfed lands are used for groundnut cultivation. Well water is largely used for irrigation. Tamil, Telugu and Kannada are widely spoken in the region.

Marandahalli and around this town has many tiny industries to manufacture coconut thread, coir, coconut powder. Also Ponmudi Theater, Angalamman Temple, CSI Zion church, Hatsun Agro Products Pvt Ltd Has a plant near by this town.

== Politics ==
Marandahalli is currently under the Palacode Legislative Assembly Constituency.
