= Jakkasamudram =

- Village panchayat
- Location in Tamil Nadu, India
- Coordinates: 12.416°N 78.048°E
- Country: India
- State: Tamil Nadu
- Region: Kongu Nadu
- District: Dharmapuri
- Panchayat: Jakkasamudram

Government
  - Type: Panchayat

Languages
  - Official: Tamil
- Time zone: UTC+5:30 (IST)

Jakkasamudram is a panchayat union in Palacode taluk, Dharmapuri district, Tamil Nadu.

Jakkasamudram has a Raghavendra Swami Mutt. Every year, devotees of Raghavendra Swami perform Aradhana, Nagara Sankeerthana, and chant the Vedas, Vishnu Sahasranama, Hari Vayu Stuthi and Brahathi Sahasra. They also offer anna dhana (food donation) to all devotees. This tradition has been followed for 120 years.
