= Periyar University =

Public university in Salem, Tamil Nadu, India

- Periyar University emblem
- Motto in English: Wisdom Maketh the World
- Established: 17 September 1997; 29 years ago
- Affiliations: UGC
- Chancellor: Governor of Tamil Nadu
- Vice-Chancellor: Vacant
- Faculty: 155
- Students: 140000+
- Doctoral students: 200
- Location: Salem, Tamil Nadu, India; 11°43′6″N 78°4′41″E
- Campus: 140 acres (57 ha); Urban
- Nickname: PU
- Website: Official website

Periyar University is a university in Salem, Tamil Nadu, India. It was established by the Government of Tamil Nadu in 1997. It is named after social reformer Thanthai Periyar E. V. Ramasamy. The University Grants Commissions, New Delhi bestowed 2f status in 1998 and 12(B) status in 2005 to the university. It is accredited by NAAC with 'A++' grade. It has been awarded a cumulative grade point average (CGPA) of 3.61 out of 4 points (performance descriptor "Excellent"). University ranked Second in India only after to Mumbai University and First in Tamil Nadu among State Universities. Periyar University is the first State University to rank "A++" grade.

== History ==
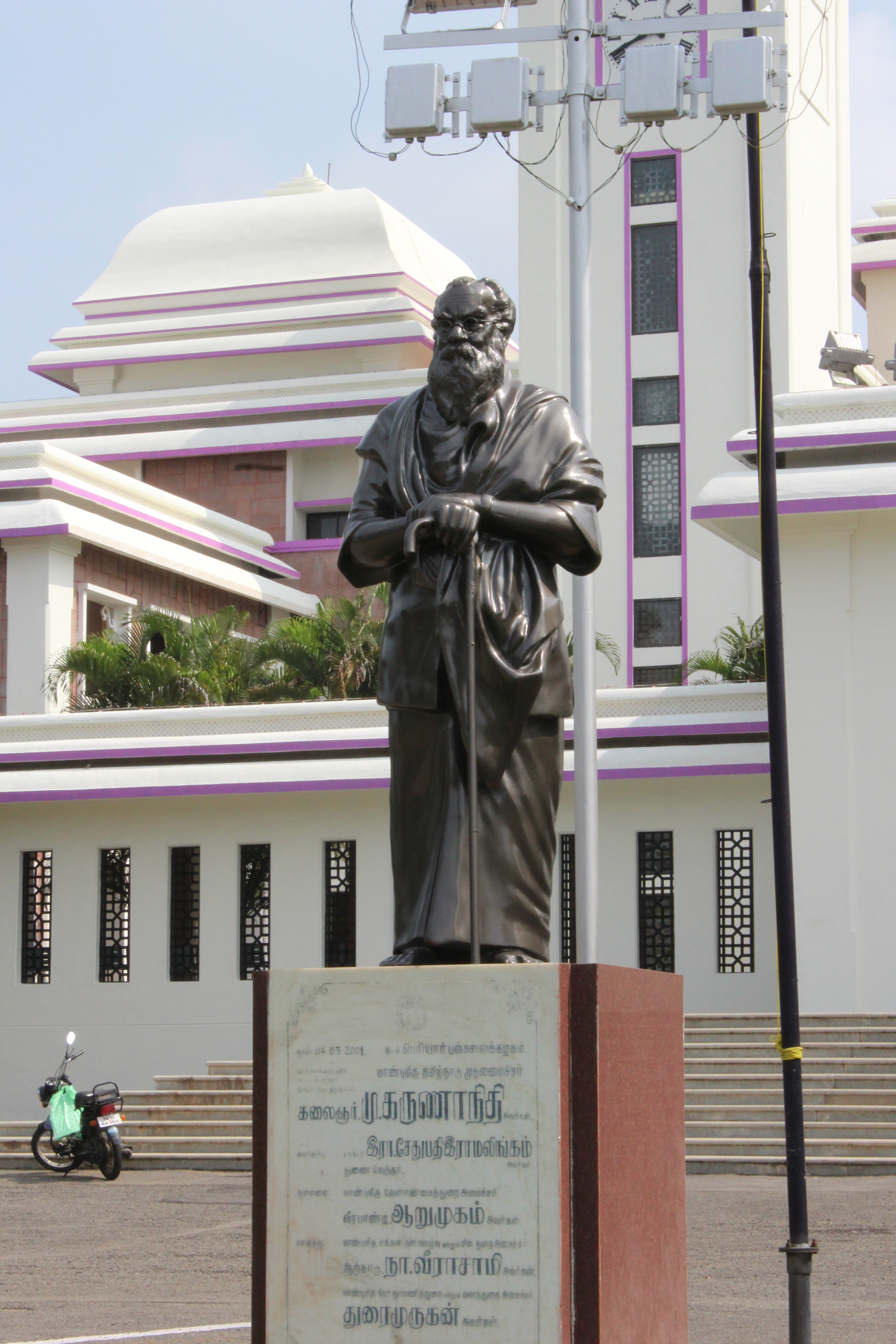
Statue of Periyar E. V. Ramasamy in front of Periyar University Building

The Government of Tamil Nadu established Periyar University at Salem on 17 September 1997, as per the provisions of the Periyar University Act, 1997. The university caters to affiliated colleges under the area comprising the districts of Salem, Dharmapuri, Namakkal and Krishnagiri. The university got 12(B) and 2f status from the University Grants Commission and was accredited by NAAC with B+ grade in 2007, which was upgraded to 'A' during the reaccreditation in May 2015. In 2021 University upgraded to "A++" grade during the reaccreditation in December 2021.

== Affiliated colleges ==
A total of 106 colleges from four districts of Tamil Nadu are affiliated with the university and PG extension center at Dharmapuri (Periyar University PG Extension Center, Adhiyaman Government Boys Higher Secondary School Campus), which includes five autonomous colleges, 65 colleges with PG departments and 45 colleges with research departments. More than 1,40,000+ students are studying in the affiliated colleges.

== Schools and departments ==
Periyar University has 27 teaching and research departments in eight schools. The departments are clustered into schools to promote inter-disciplinary research. A total of 79 academic programmes are offered by the departments. A proposal has been submitted to the state government for approval to start a History Department.

== Constituent colleges ==
Apart from its teaching and research departments, the university has established five constituent colleges at Mettur, Edappadi (both in Salem District), Pennagaram, Harur, and Pappireddipatti (in Dharmapuri District).

== Location ==
The university is on National Highway 7, 7 km (4.3 mi) from Salem city. The campus extends to about 110 acres (0.45 km^{2}), accommodating the administrative and department buildings.

== Rankings ==
University and College rankings

General – India
- NIRF (Overall) (2024): 100
- NIRF (Universities) (2024): 56

The university was ranked 4th Rank (ARRAI) Atal Ranking among the universities. The university was ranked 56th among universities and 100th Overall by the National Institutional Ranking Framework (NIRF) in 2024.
