= Sitheri =

Coordinates: 11°54′N 79°09′E

Sitheri or Sitteri is a hill station in Harur taluk, Dharmapuri district, Tamil Nadu, India. It is located on the Sitheri Hills, one of the segments of the Eastern Ghats of Tamil Nadu. Sitheri is situated at an altitude of 1,097.3 metres (3,600 ft). The area comprises various vegetation types, such as the evergreen, semi-evergreen, riparian, dry deciduous bush, and southern thorn bush forests.

The minimum and maximum temperature are 19°C (66.2 °F) and 40°C (104 °F) in winter and summer, respectively. The average annual rainfall is 900 millimetres, attained from both northeast and southwest monsoons. Topographically, the area is undulating, with an altitude varying from 240 to 1,266 metres. The total area of Sitheri village is found to be 400 square kilometres, with a total population of 9,045 (4,656 male and 4,389 female) as of 2010.
