= Hogenakkal, Dharmapuri =

Hogenakkal ஒகேனக்கல்
- Hamlet
- Location in Tamil Nadu, India Hogenakkal (India)
- Coordinates: 12°07′15″N 77°46′40″E
- Country: India
- State: Tamil Nadu
- District: Dharmapuri
- Taluk: Pennagaram
- Revenue block: Pennagaram
- Named for: Nearby waterfalls

Languages
  - Official: Tamil
- Time zone: UTC+5:30 (IST)
- PIN: 636817

Hogenakkal is a hamlet in the Pennagaram taluk of Dharmapuri district, tamil name is Thalaineer aruvi(தலைநீர் அருவி). Ugunir Kal/Marikottayam in the Indian state of Tamil Nadu.

== Etymology ==
The hamlet of Hogenakkal shares its etymology with the nearby falls, deriving from the tamil words 'hoge' and 'kall', meaning smoke and rock respectively. Hogenakkal basically means smoke over the rocks, referencing the appearance of the mist of the waterfalls.

== Geography ==
The hamlet is close to the confluence of the Kaveri and Chinnar rivers, just upstream of Hogenakkal Falls. It is near the Tamil Nadu-Karnataka border, which is partly formed by the Kaveri River. Hogenakkal is in the western part of Pennagaram revenue block, which is in the western extreme of both the taluk and the district. It is within part of Woddapatti reserved forest, at the western terminus of State Highway 60.

== See also ==
- Hogenakkal Falls
