= Kuppusamy =

Kuppusamy is an Indian surname used in the state of Tamil Nadu. Notable people with that name include:

- Anitha Kuppusamy, Indian Tamil folk and Carnatic singer
- G. Nehru Kuppusamy, Indian politician
- N. Kuppusamy, Indian politician
- Pushpavanam Kuppusamy, Indian Tamil folk singer
- S. Nagarajan Kuppusamy, Singaporean convicted killer
- Bala Kuppusamy, Singaporean serial rapist and robber
