= Allalapatty =

- Village
- Location in Tamil Nadu, India Allalapatty (India)
- Coordinates: 12.0506°N 78.4330°E
- Country: India
- State: Tamil Nadu
- District: Dharmapuri
- Subdistrict: Pappireddipatty
- Time zone: UTC+05:30 (IST)

Allalapatty is a small village located in Pappireddipatty taluk, Dharmapuri district.
