= Karimangalam taluk =

Coordinates: 12.3060°N 78.2045°E

Karimangalam taluk is a taluk in the Dharmapuri district of the Indian state of Tamil Nadu. On 10 February 2016, Karimangalam taluk was formed by merging parts of Palacode and Harur taluks of Dharmapuri district. The headquarters of the taluk is the town of Kariamangalam. This taluk contains a total of 52 panchayat villages.
