= Hogenakkal Eco Tourism =

- Country: India
- State: Tamil Nadu
- District: Dharmapuri District

Languages
  - Official: Tamil
- Time zone: UTC+5:30 (IST)
- Governing body: Tamil Nadu Forest Dept
- Website: www.hogenakkalecotourism.com

Hogenakkal are waterfalls located in Dharmapuri district of the state Tamil Nadu, India. Hogenakkal Eco Tourism seeks to protect wilderness and ecological integrity of Hogenakkal.

== Main Objective ==
Forest Development Agency (FDA) constitutes a committee named as Eco-Development Committee (EDC) which comprises members from local villages. The Eco- Development Committee aims to provide the employment opportunities to the local communities hence improving their standard of living.

== Eco Tourism Activities ==
Hogenakkal Ecotourism with EDC carrying out various eco-tourism activities such as a coracle ride, oil massage and eco-trekking. Hogenakkal Eco-Tourism gives an opportunity to book these eco-tourism activities online. The revenue generated through these eco-tourism activities are shared among the village people around hogenakkal.

== Accommodation ==
Hogenakkal Eco Tourism offers accommodation rooms near Hogenakkal Falls for the tourists. One can check the room availability and book the rooms online. The revenues are used for the enhancement of the local communities.

== Attractions ==
=== Main Falls ===
Hogenakkal main falls have an elevation of about 66 ft. River Kaveri is the main source of this falls. As the Kaveri flows through the dense medicinal forest of Western Ghats, the water from this fall has many medicinal properties. The carbonate rocks found near this falls are considered as the oldest one in the world. One can use the watchtower to see the full view of the falls and the Kaveri River. A motion sensor alarm had installed as a precaution, to prevent the tourist crossing the safety area of the Hogenakkal falls.

=== Coracle Rides ===
Coracle ride is considered as the main attraction in Hogenakkal, which attracts many tourists to this spot. Coracles are used to view the waterfalls closer and it was not allowed during monsoon seasons. Only four plus one person including the driver is allowed in a single coracle and children are not allowed to take the coracle ride.

=== Crocodile Rehabilitation Centre ===
To preserve and protect the crocodiles from being hunted, the Crocodile Rehabilitation Centre was established in Hogenakkal in the year 1975. There are almost 113 crocodiles and visitors are allowed to visit the park throughout the year except Tuesday of every week.

=== Children’s Park ===
A children's park is located within the Crocodile Rehabilitation centre Hogenakkal. The park is open to the visitors throughout the year. Minimum charge is collected from visitors as the entrance fee, which is used for the maintenance of the park.

=== Medicinal Garden ===
The garden comprises more than 108 native species of medicinal herbs. The medicinal herbs are displayed with their names which helps to educate the tourists about the biodiversity in hogenakkal. Visitors are allowed in this garden throughout the year.
