= Morappur Assembly constituency =

Coordinates: 12.11°N 78.39°E

Morappur
- Former constituency for the Tamil Nadu Legislative Assembly

Constituency details
- Country: India
- Region: South India
- State: Tamil Nadu
- District: Dharmapuri
- Established: 1977
- Abolished: 2008
- Total electors: 1,73,038

Morappur is a legislative assembly constituency, that includes the city, Morappur. It is part of Dharmapuri Lok Sabha constituency.

== Members of the Legislative Assembly ==
Assembly	Duration	Winner	Party
Sixth	1977-80	N. Kuppusamy	All India Anna Dravida Munnetra Kazhagam
Seventh	1980-84	N. Kuppusamy	All India Anna Dravida Munnetra Kazhagam
Eighth	1984-89	T. Theerthagiri Gounder	Indian National Congress
Ninth	1989-91	V. Mullaivendhan	Dravida Munnetra Kazhagam
Tenth	1991-96	K. Singaram	All India Anna Dravida Munnetra Kazhagam
Eleventh	1996-01	V. Mullaivendhan	Dravida Munnetra Kazhagam
Twelfth	2001-06	P. Palaniappan	All India Anna Dravida Munnetra Kazhagam
Thirteenth	2006-11	V. Mullaivendhan	Dravida Munnetra Kazhagam

The constituency was merged into the newly formed Pappireddipatti Assembly constituency after the constituency delimitation in 2008.

== Election results ==
=== 2006 ===
2006 Tamil Nadu Legislative Assembly election: Morappur
Party	Candidate	Votes	%	±%
DMK	V. Mullaivendhan	64,962	51.24%	16.01%
AIADMK	K. Singaram	51,771	40.83%	−15.48%
DMDK	S. Saravanan	4,932	3.89%	
Independent	R. Pathmanapan	2,116	1.67%	
BJP	S. Jayakumar	1,792	1.41%	
BSP	S. Thirumoorthi	1,211	0.96%	
Margin of victory		13,191	10.40%	−10.68%
Turnout		126,784	73.27%	12.13%
Registered electors		173,038		
DMK gain from AIADMK		Swing	-5.07%	

=== 2001 ===
2001 Tamil Nadu Legislative Assembly election: Morappur
Party	Candidate	Votes	%	±%
AIADMK	P. Palaniappan	62,266	56.31%	27.97%
DMK	E. V. Rajasekaran	38,950	35.22%	−18.76%
Tamil Desiyak Katchi	M. Selvakumar	3,355	3.03%	
MDMK	P. Mathiazhagan	2,709	2.45%	0.03%
Independent	G. Vasantha	1,402	1.27%	
Independent	R. Chinnaraju	1,167	1.06%	
Independent	M. Sathiavani	450	0.41%	
Independent	P. Kamalasekar	278	0.25%	
Margin of victory		23,316	21.09%	−4.56%
Turnout		110,577	61.14%	−9.30%
Registered electors		180,856		
AIADMK gain from DMK		Swing	2.33%	

=== 1996 ===
1996 Tamil Nadu Legislative Assembly election: Morappur
Party	Candidate	Votes	%	±%
DMK	V. Mullaivendhan	59,518	53.98%	31.39%
AIADMK	K. Singaram	31,244	28.34%	−24.95%
PMK	T. Ramalingam	15,689	14.23%	
MDMK	R. Ravanan	2,669	2.42%	
Independent	M. Annamalai	320	0.29%	
Independent	R. Sivakavi	182	0.17%	
Independent	R. Kennedy	169	0.15%	
Independent	R. Ayyakannu	159	0.14%	
Independent	M. Shanmugam	117	0.11%	
Independent	V. Chandrasekaran	70	0.06%	
Independent	M. P. Sekar	61	0.06%	
Margin of victory		28,274	25.65%	−3.75%
Turnout		110,250	70.44%	1.03%
Registered electors		163,786		
DMK gain from AIADMK		Swing	0.70%	

=== 1991 ===
1991 Tamil Nadu Legislative Assembly election: Morappur
Party	Candidate	Votes	%	±%
AIADMK	K. Singaram	53,477	53.29%	22.83%
PMK	A. Arunachalam	23,973	23.89%	
DMK	V. Samikannu	22,678	22.60%	−18.00%
THMM	C. Sathiyamoorthy	225	0.22%	
Margin of victory		29,504	29.40%	19.25%
Turnout		100,353	69.41%	5.41%
Registered electors		148,890		
AIADMK gain from DMK		Swing	12.69%	

=== 1989 ===
1989 Tamil Nadu Legislative Assembly election: Morappur
Party	Candidate	Votes	%	±%
DMK	V. Mullaivendhan	34,038	40.60%	5.57%
AIADMK	M. G. Sekhar	25,531	30.46%	
INC	Venkatachalam	16,308	19.45%	−31.31%
Independent	M. Manoharan	4,922	5.87%	
Independent	M. Annamalai	994	1.19%	
Independent	S. Rajaguru	446	0.53%	
Independent	G. Sugadev	338	0.40%	
Independent	M. Rathinasamy	250	0.30%	
Independent	V. Raman	241	0.29%	
Independent	M. Singaravelu	164	0.20%	
Independent	N. V. Chennan	147	0.18%	
Margin of victory		8,507	10.15%	−5.58%
Turnout		83,831	64.00%	−8.99%
Registered electors		133,712		
DMK gain from INC		Swing	-10.16%	

=== 1984 ===
1984 Tamil Nadu Legislative Assembly election: Morappur
Party	Candidate	Votes	%	±%
INC	T. Theerthagiri Gounder	39,779	50.77%	11.01%
DMK	V. Samikannu	27,453	35.04%	
Independent	R. Ramachandran	8,813	11.25%	
BJP	T. M. A. Mariappan	1,528	1.95%	
Independent	M. Marydass	782	1.00%	
Margin of victory		12,326	15.73%	−1.69%
Turnout		78,355	72.99%	0.96%
Registered electors		115,821		
INC gain from AIADMK		Swing	-6.41%	

=== 1980 ===
1980 Tamil Nadu Legislative Assembly election: Morappur
Party	Candidate	Votes	%	±%
AIADMK	N. Kuppusamy	43,096	57.18%	22.76%
INC	R. Balasubramanian	29,967	39.76%	
JP	G. Suadev	1,089	1.44%	
Independent	M. R. Srinivasan	713	0.95%	
Independent	K. Theethan	269	0.36%	
Margin of victory		13,129	17.42%	14.99%
Turnout		75,370	72.03%	1.89%
Registered electors		106,081		
AIADMK hold		Swing	22.76%	

=== 1977 ===
1977 Tamil Nadu Legislative Assembly election: Morappur
Party	Candidate	Votes	%	±%
AIADMK	N. Kuppusamy	22,886	34.42%	
DMK	R. P. Murugan	21,270	31.99%	
JP	K. Arunachalam	13,770	20.71%	
CPI	P. P. Rasu	4,616	6.94%	
Independent	K. Natarasan	3,710	5.58%	
Independent	M. G. Sekar	139	0.21%	
Independent	T. V. Anganna Chettiar	108	0.16%	
Margin of victory		1,616	2.43%	
Turnout		66,499	70.14%	
Registered electors		95,843		
AIADMK win (new seat)				
