= Kethanahalli, Dharmapuri =

Kethanahalli Kethampatti
- Village
- Location of Kethanahalli in Tamilnadu
- Coordinates: 12.32681°N 78.13583°E
- Country: India
- State: Tamil Nadu
- District: Dharmapuri
- Taluk: Karimangalam

Government
  - Type: Village
  - Body: Panchayath

Languages
  - Official: Tamil
  - Secondary: Telugu, Kannada
- Time zone: UTC+5:30 (IST)
- PIN: 636808
- Telephone code: 04348
- Vehicle registration: TN-29

Kethanahalli is a small village in Karimangalam block in Dharmapuri District of Tamil Nadu State, India. It comes under Kethanahalli Panchayath.

St. Francis Xavier Church is the village.

== Gallery ==
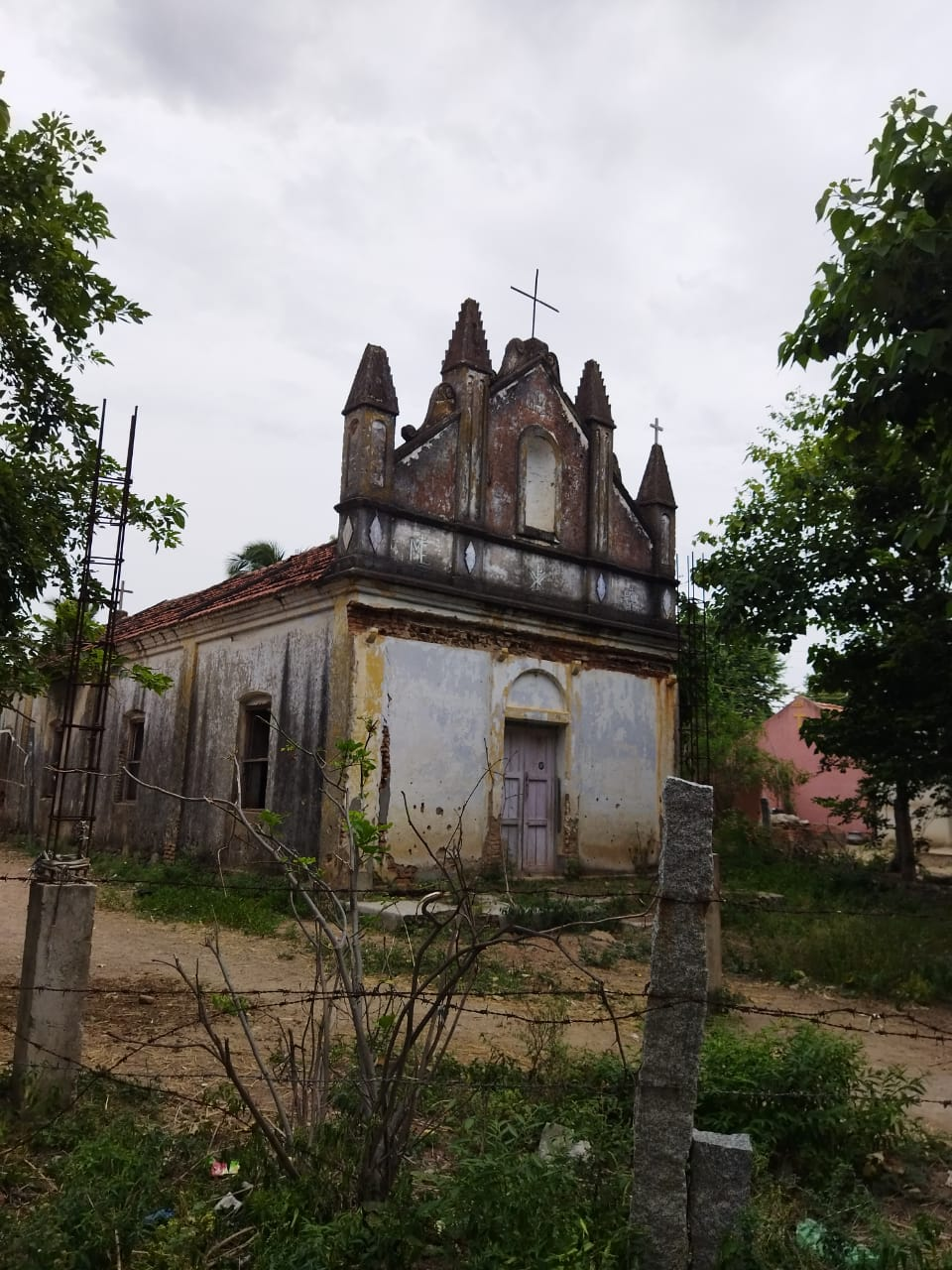
Abandoned St Francis Xavier Church

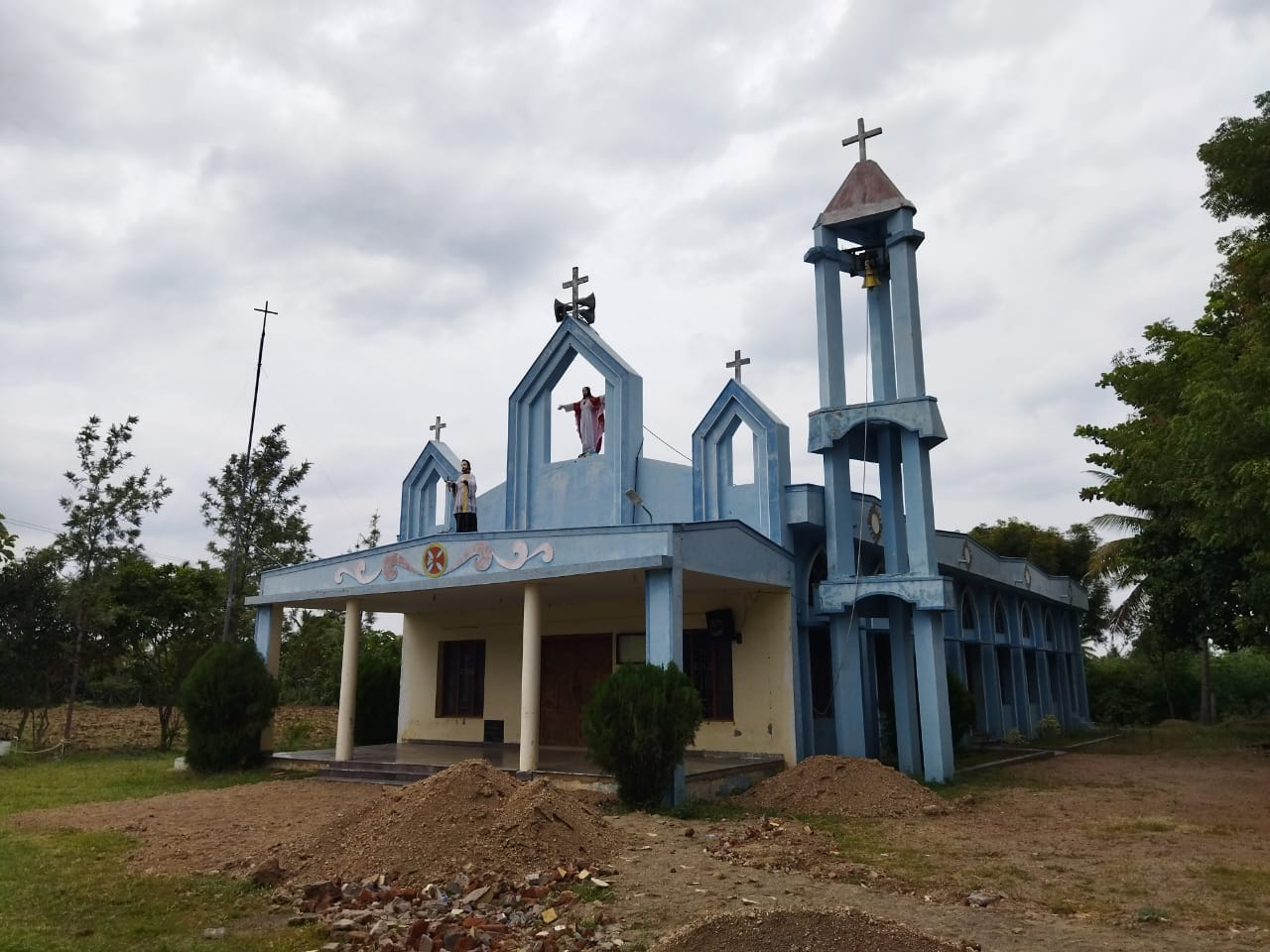
St Francis Xavier Church
