= Paruvathanahalli =

Paruvathanahalli is a Village Panchayat in Pennagaram taluk, Dharmapuri, Tamil Nadu, India.
