= Gummanur =

Gummanur Village
- Location in Tamil Nadu, India
- Coordinates: 12.4465506°N 78.0148602°E
- Country: India
- State: Tamil Nadu
- District: Dharmapuri

Government
  - Type: Selection Grade Panjayath
  - Body: Village Panjayath
- Elevation: 469 m (1,539 ft)

Languages
  - Official: Tamil
- Time zone: UTC+5:30 (IST)
- PIN: 635116
- Telephone code: 04342
- Vehicle registration: TN-29
- Website: http://gummanoor.blogspot.in/

Gummanur is a village in Dharmapuri district in the state of Tamil Nadu in India.
