= Maniyadhalli =

Maniyadhalli is a panchayat union in the Dharmapuri district, Tamil Nadu, India.
