= Centre for Socio-economic and Environmental Studies =

Non-profit research institute in Kerala, India

- Abbreviation: CSES
- Type: Independent, Non-profit, Non-governmental organisation
- Location: Kochi, Kerala, India
- Website: csesindia.org

The Centre for Socio-economic and Environmental Studies (CSES), founded in 1996, is an independent, non-profit, research institute based at Kochi, Kerala, India.

== Key research areas ==
The centre has made significant contributions in the following priority areas:

=== Governance and public service delivery ===
A major area of interest of CSES is how services are delivered to the general public by government agencies. From time to time, CSES has looked into service delivery of various public agencies, including government schools, health care facilities, anganwadis, welfare institutions, local governments and government offices. Through this research, CSES has identified service delivery parameters important to the citizens and developed performance indicators across these parameters that facilitate evaluation over time. Most of these studies are commissioned by various Government agencies including the Modernising Government Program (MGP), Kerala Local Government Service Delivery Project (KLGSDP) and the Administrative Reforms Commission (ARC) of the Government of Kerala. The studies on water governance conducted for the World Bank and Jalanidhi.

=== Poverty and social exclusion ===
The Kerala Model of Development which won accolades for high social development with low economic growth, also had its "outliers" or sections of the society that the development bypassed; namely the Scheduled Tribes and the Fisher-folk. Bringing the issues faced by such marginalized sections into mainstream academic and policy-level discourse is an objective that CSES has persistently followed. Research at CSES also addresses issues of other groups of marginalized sections in the society such as the rural and urban poor, migrant workers, elderly and disabled. For instance, studies on alternative education, tribal health, education of migrant children, management of household finances by poor, indebtedness among rural poor, welfare legislation for vulnerable groups.

=== Public finance ===
Right from its inception, public finance was one of the core areas of research activity at the centre. Issues related to state finances and fiscal federalism- fiscal powers of the central, state and local governments are some of the key research topics pursued in this area. The centre has examined the implications of the recommendations of successive Central Finance Commissions.

=== Decentralization ===
Another major area of research where CSES has done various studies is that of Decentralization.

=== Education ===
Education has been a major research theme of CSES ever since its inception. Being located in Kerala, a region which received national and international attention for its achievement in the field of education, CSES has tried to develop an insider's perspective of the strengths and weaknesses of State's education system right from pre-school education to professional and higher education. Broadly, CSES studies examined the social, economic, financial and management aspects of the education sector. Some of the specific aspects examined include exclusionary trends in the education sector, education of marginalized groups such as children from tribal families, children with disabilities and children of migrant labor, entry barriers to professional and higher education, private cost of education.

=== Labor and migration ===
Labor studies is a prominent research theme pursued at the CSES particularly with a focus on labor market transformation in the state of Kerala. CSES conducted a pioneering study on interstate labor migration to Kerala. Of late, with increasing long-distance labor inflows to Kerala, CSES has been focusing on research to assess vulnerabilities encountered by migrant workers, education of migrant children and social protection programs available and accessible to them. Apart from the studies on interstate labor migration, CSES focuses on international labor migration.

=== Urban development ===
Impact and implications of urbanization is a cross-cutting theme addressed in several research projects of CSES. In an effort to better understand facets of urbanization, CSES has undertaken a research study on the commuting pattern for work in Kochi which captures how mobility requirements of those commuting daily to the city are side-lined in city planning.

=== Demography and health ===
Dynamics of Kerala's demographic transition— high life expectancy, low infant, child and maternal mortality, decreasing share of children and increasing share of elderly in the population —has been a focus of research at the CSES. These demographic issues are explored to identify changes observed, adaptations required in social sectors of education and health and in relation to the Population pressure on land.

Health is a domain where CSES has worked extensively across regions, by conducting various rounds of District Level Household Survey on Reproductive and Child Health, Global Adult Tobacco Survey and Global Youth Tobacco Survey in different states. CSES has also conducted studies on the provision of health care services by the government and health care utilization, health care expenditure and health outcomes of the general population as well as vulnerable sections such as women,

=== Gender ===
Apart from undertaking researches exclusively on women's issues viz. health, livelihood and employment, gender has figured as a major component in various studies of CSES.
