= Pennagaram block =

Pennagaram block is a revenue block in the Dharmapuri district of Tamil Nadu, India. It has a total of 33 panchayat villages.
