= A. Govindasamy =

Indian politician

Member of the Tamil Nadu Legislative Assembly
- In office 23 May 2019 – 4 May 2026
- Preceded by: P. Palaniappan
- Succeeded by: Maragatham Vetrivel
- Constituency: Pappireddipatti

Personal details
- Party: All India Anna Dravida Munnetra Kazhagam
- Parent: Arumugam (father)

Arumugam Govindasamy is an Indian politician and is Member of the Legislative Assembly of Tamil Nadu. He was elected to the Tamil Nadu legislative assembly as an All India Anna Dravida Munnetra Kazhagam candidate from Pappireddipatti constituency in the by-election in 2019. He contested in the same constituency in 2021 Tamil Nadu Assembly elections and won the seat as AIADMK candidate.

== Electoral performance ==
| Election | Constituency | Political party | Result | Vote % | Opposition | | | Ref |
| Election | Constituency | Political party | Result | Vote % | Candidate | Political party | Vote % | Ref |
|---|---|---|---|---|---|---|---|---|
| 2019 by-election | Pappireddippatti | AIADMK | Won | 49.21% | A. Mani | DMK | 40.46% | |
| 2021 | Pappireddippatti | AIADMK | Won | 52.13% | M. Prabhu Rajasekar | DMK | 35.31% | - |
