= P. Palaniappan =

Indian politician

Minister for Higher Education, Government of Tamil Nadu
- In office 16 May 2011 – 22 May 2016
- Chief Minister: J. Jayalalithaa; O. Panneerselvam; J. Jayalalithaa
- Preceded by: K. Ponmudy
- Succeeded by: K. P. Anbalagan

Headquarters Secretary of the All India Anna Dravida Munnetra Kazhagam
- In office 26 August 2012 – 8 June 2016
- General Secretary: J. Jayalalithaa
- Headquarters Manager: P. Mahalingam
- Preceded by: K. A. Sengottaiyan
- Succeeded by: Edappadi K. Palaniswami

Personal details
- Born: Dharmapuri, Tamil Nadu, India
- Party: Dravida Munnetra Kazhagam (Since 2021)
- Other political affiliations: All India Anna Dravida Munnetra Kazhagam (Till 2017); Amma Makkal Munnetra Kazhagam (2018 - 2021)

P. Palaniappan is an Indian politician and former Minister of Higher Education and Member of the Legislative Assembly of Tamil Nadu from Pappireddipatti constituency. He served as the headquarters secretary of AIADMK from 2012 to 2016. He is former Deputy General Secretary of Amma Makkal Munnetra Kazhagam party.

He was one of hardworking persons in the Ministry during the period 2011-2016. He is most help to the Tamil Nadu Government Higher Education and the 18 members who were disqualified by Speaker P. Dhanapal as they withdrew support to Chief Minister Edappadi K. Palaniswami and became loyal to rebel leader T.T.V. Dhinakaran and joined his party Amma Makkal Munnetra Kazhagam. On July 3, 2021, he joined DMK.

== Electoral performance ==
Election	Constituency	Political party	Result	Vote %	Opposition			Ref
Election	Constituency	Political party	Result	Vote %	Candidate	Political party	Vote %	Ref
2001	Morappur	AIADMK	Won	56.31%	E. V. Rajasekaran	DMK	35.22%	
2011	Pappireddippatti	AIADMK	Won	45.39%	V. Mullaivendhan	DMK	39.17%	
2016	Pappireddippatti	AIADMK	Won	35.56%	A. Sathiyamoorthy	PMK	29.47%	
2021	Pappireddippatti	AMMK	Lost	7.22%	A. Govindasamy	AIADMK	52.13%	-
2026	Pappireddippatti	DMK	Lost	29.04%	Maragatham Vetrivel	AIADMK	43.03%	-
