= Buddireddipatti =

Buddireddipatti BDY
- village
- Location in Tamil Nadu, India Buddireddipatti (India)
- Coordinates: 12°0′0″N 78°18′0″E
- Country: India
- State: Tamil Nadu
- District: Dharmapuri

Languages
  - Official: Tamil
- Time zone: UTC+5:30 (IST)
- PIN: 635302
- Telephone code: 04346
- Vehicle registration: TN 29

Buddireddipatti is a village in Dharmapuri district, Tamil Nadu, India.

== Geography ==
It is located at Dharmapuri district, comes under Pappireddipatti taluk.

== Location ==
Buddireddipatti is connected by a rail. Nearest airport is Salem Airport.
