= Koothapadi =

Koothapadi is a town panchayat located in Dharmapuri district in the Indian state of Tamil Nadu.

This town was previously a panchayat and was upgraded to a town panchayat in 2025 by the Government of Tamil Nadu.
