= Ramakkal Lake =

- Location within Tamil Nadu
- Location: Dharmapuri district, Tamil Nadu, India
- Coordinates: 12°8′39.2″N 78°9′29.95″E
- Type: Natural Lake/(Impact Crater)
- Basin countries: India
- Max. length: 1.04814 km (0.65128 mi)
- Frozen: Never
- Islands: None

Ramakkal Lake, is a lake located near Dharmapuri city in Dharmapuri district, Tamil Nadu.

== Geography ==
Lake is situated at Dharmapuri, Tamil Nadu, India, spanning 259 acres in area it has capacity of 33.5 mcft, irrigates for over 111 hectares of land. Lake being used for irrigation, fishing and also for animal needs.

Pollution

Alleged discharge of sewage from all 33 Dharmapuri Municipality wards into the lake via storm water drains. In 2014, two Sewage treatment plants were established at ₹20 lakh each by Public Works Department, but they were dysfunctional, sewage still flows into the lake.
