= V. Mullaivendhan =

Indian politician

V. Mullaivendhan, also spelled V. Mullaiventhan, is a Anna Dravida Munnetra Kazhagam (ADMK) party politician from Indian state of Tamil Nadu. He was elected to the Tamil Nadu Legislative Assembly from Morappur constituency in 1989, 1996 and 2006.

Mullaivendhan has served as minister of Information and Publicity from 1996. Later in 1998, he was allocated with additional subject Stationery and Printing and Government Press; subsequently he was re-designated as Minister for Information, Publicity and Printing. He was relieved as minister on 8 March 2001 and was succeeded by N. Suresh Rajan.

== Electoral performance ==
Election	Constituency	Political party	Result	Vote %	Opposition			Ref
Election	Constituency	Political party	Result	Vote %	Candidate	Political party	Vote %	Ref
1989	Morappur	DMK	Won	40.60%	M. G. Sekhar	AIADMK	30.46%	
1996	Morappur	DMK	Won	53.98%	K. Singaram	AIADMK	28.34%	
2006	Morappur	DMK	Won	51.24%	K. Singaram	AIADMK	40.83%	
2011	Pappireddippatti	DMK	Lost	39.17%	P. Palaniappan	AIADMK	45.39%	
