= Harur division =

Harur division is a revenue division in the Dharmapuri district of Tamil Nadu, India.
