= Dharmapuri division =

Coordinates: 12.1260°N 78.154°E

Dharmapuri division is a revenue division in the Dharmapuri district of Tamil Nadu, India.
