= Theerthamalai =

Sacred place in Tamil Nadu, India

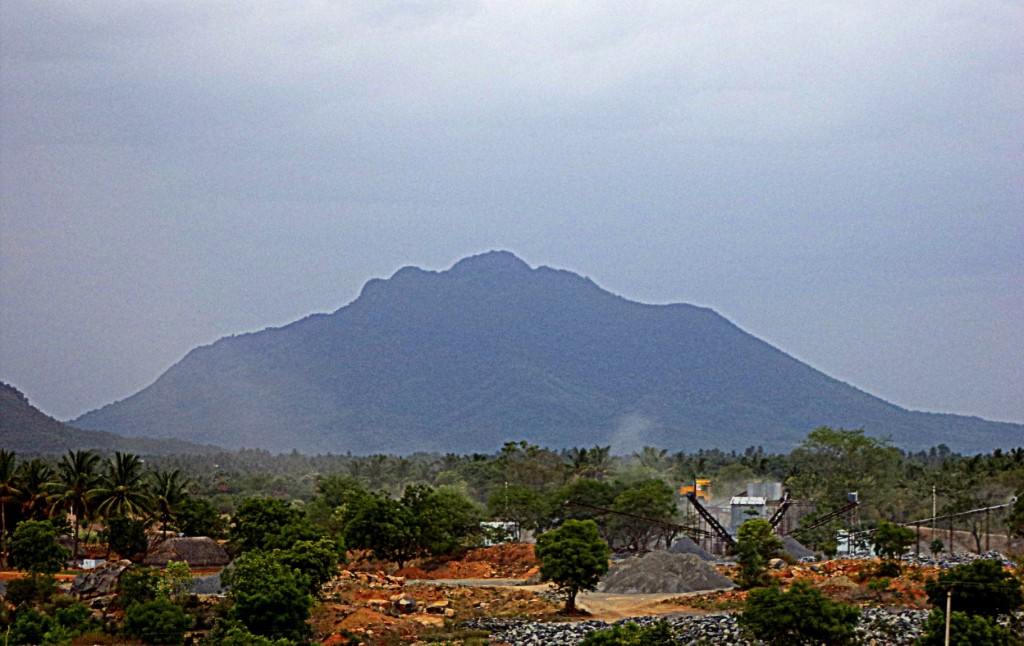
View of Theerthamalai from Harur

Theerthamalai is an important sacred place in Harur taluk of Dharmapuri district, located in Tamil Nadu, India. The name Theerthamalai in Tamil means "Hill with Holy Water". Theerthamalai is a village situated about 16 km (about 9.9 mi) northeast of Harur.

Theerthagirishwarar Temple is located at the top of a hillock. The temple, situated about 1 km (about 0.6 mi) up the steep slope of the hillock, derives its name from the five springs in the temple. Lord Theerthagireeswar (Shiva) is the worshiped deity. The Rama Theertham is a tiny waterfall about 9.1 meters (about 30 feet) high. During summer, even when the river is dry, there is fresh water from in spring that flows from rock.

== Sacred site ==
Lord Sri Rama, after winning the war against Ravana and returning to Ayodhya, wanted to perform Shiva Puja in the temple. As Sri Hanuman could not return in time with holy Ganga water and flowers from Kasi, Rama shot an arrow on rock creating the Rama Theertha waterfall and completed the puja. Sri Hanuman threw the pot of water from here, which fell at a distance of about 12 km (about 7.4 mi) from the hill and became Hanuman Theertham. People take the first dip in Hanuman Theertha and then at Rama Theertha for relief from sins.

== Theerthagirishwarar Temple ==
=== Temple history ===
Theerthagirishwarar Temple was built in the 7th century, with many contributions being made by the Chola and Pandya Kings. Several inscriptions can be found in Theerthagireeswarar Temple. The inscriptions on the temple say that Chola emperors, including Rajendra Cholan, regularly visited this temple. Poet Saint Arunagirinathar referred to Theerthagirieeswarar Temple in his compositions.

=== Festivals ===
The famous festivals of the temple are the 10-day Masi Brahmmotsavam in February–March with procession of the presiding Lord, car festival on the 7th day, wedding festival on the 5th day and Sathaparana festival – Lord in reclining posture on the 10th day; Abishek pujas with 365 litres of milk on the Chithirai new year day falling mostly on 14 April or a day earlier or later occasionally, Navarathri in September–October and Aadi 18 July–August with special abishek at night followed by Girivalam – circumambulation of the hill. The devotee crowd in the temple is usually big on Saturdays and Sundays. Pradosha is devotionally observed. Also Tamil and English New Year Day are observed in the temple.

== List of Theertham ==
Theertham means "holy water" in Tamil. There are multiple "Theertham" springs, all of which have their origin in different parts of the rocky surface. Remarkably, the tiny waterfalls never dry up, even during the most severe drought seasons recorded in history. They are:

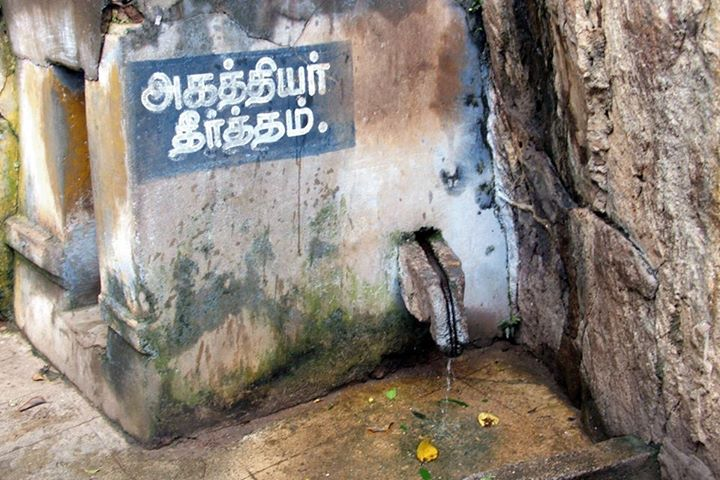

- Agasthya Theertham In the Hill
- Ramar Theerththam
- Agni Theertham
- Gowri Theertham
- Kumara Theertham
- Vasishta theertham Inth top of the Hill Cave
- Vayu Theertham
- Varuna Theerththam
- Indhira Theerththam, Andiyur (Mondukuli)
- Yema Theertham, Veppampatty
- Anuman theertham, Hanumantheerththam River

== Landslide ==
There was a landslide reported during the 1990s that happened overnight.
