= Perumbalai =

Village in Tamil Nadu, India

- Village
- Location in Tamil Nadu, India Perumbalai (India)
- Coordinates: 11.9633°N 77.9388°E
- Country: India
- State: Tamil Nadu
- District: Dharmapuri

Language(s)
  - Official: Tamil
- Time zone: UTC+5:30 (IST)
- Postal code: 636811

Perumbalai is a village in Tamil Nadu, India. It is located within Dharmapuri district.

Perumbalai is situated on the banks of Nagavathi River.

== Historical significance and archaeological finds ==
Perumbalai has gained local and national attention recently due to discovery of hundreds of artifacts dating back to the 6th century BCE. The artifacts unearthed include terracotta figurines, sherds with geometric symbols and potteries with well-levigated clay. Chief Minister of Tamil Nadu, M.K. Stalin, released a report of the diggings and finds by S. Paranthaman and R. Venkata Guru Prasanna in June 2024. It was titled "Excavations at Perumbalai, 2022."

Perumbalai area was on the radar of archeologists earlier also, in the 19th and 20th centuries.

Hero stones dating back to the 13th century have also been discovered in Perumbalai.

Excavations are ongoing and may find important clues to ancient Tamil civilization. However, experts have warned that these endeavours have taken on a political turn and may lead to culture wars.
