= Nallampalli taluk =

Taluk in Dharmapuri, Tamil Nadu, India

Nallampalli taluk is a taluk in the Dharmapuri district of the Indian state of Tamil Nadu. On 11 February 2016, Nallampalli taluk was formed from parts of Dharmapuri taluk. The headquarters of the taluk is the town of Nallampalli. This taluk contains a total of 31 panchayat villages.
