= Tribal Health Initiative =

Non-profit organisation

Tribal Health Initiative (THI) is a non profit organisation located in the Sittilingi valley in Dharmapuri district, Tamil Nadu. It works for the welfare of the local community who are predominantly Malavasi tribals. THI was founded by Dr. Regi George and Dr. Lalitha Regi in 1993 to provide quality healthcare at an affordable rate to the tribal population of Sittilingi village in rural Tamil Nadu with just one Outpatient unit (OP). As of 2010 it had grown to include a 24-bed hospital with a labour room, neonatal unit, operation theatre, diagnostic laboratory and imaging facilities, a community health outreach programme, an organic farming initiative and a craft initiative which aims to revive traditional Lambadi embroidery.

As of 2018, THI is a full-fledged hospital with six doctors and 30 nurses attending to close to one lakh patients every year. The hospital has received an ISO-certification. Hospital has modern facilities like an advanced Intensive Care Unit (ICU), a dental clinic, a labour room, a neo-natal room, an emergency room and a fully functional laboratory.

== Brief history ==
Tribal Health Initiative was founded in 1993 by a young doctor couple originally from Kerala, Dr. Regi George, an anesthesiologist, and Dr. Lalitha Regi, a gynecologist who were inspired by Mahatma Gandhi and the vision of Health For All. They are fondly called Gi and Tha by THI staff and the local community. The project started off with their savings inside a mud and brick hut from where Dr. Regi and Dr. Lalitha ran an out patient clinic in the mornings where they settled along with their three-year-old son and an engineer friend. The hut doubled up as a labour room or emergency room when required. A few years later Action Aid funded the construction of a hospital building consisting of an operation theatre, labour room and inpatient ward. Till 1993, before the couple moved to village, the hospital for the people of Sittilingi was 50 kilometres away and the surgical place around 100 km away. The infant mortality rate before their arrival to village was 147 per 1000 babies which came down to 20 after their relocation. In year 1997, a 10-bed tribal hospital was built with labor room and an operating room lit by a 100-watt bulb and equipped with an EMO Ether Inhaler & Vaporiser and local women were trained to be health auxiliaries in case of urgencies and perform critical tasks including diagnosis and treatment of minor ailments, assisting during procedures and antenatal and infant care. Presently, except for complex cases the normal deliveries happen in village. THI proved a huge facility for the villagers through which the educational, technological, farming, craft sectors and women entrepreneurship here have developed. Dr Lalitha had also been engaged in promoting the Lambadi handcrafts under the name Porgai (meaning pride in Lambadi dialect) to encourage women entrepreneurship. The couple are also trying to get credit for villagers to support purchase of cattle or goats and increase revenue from products made using local plantations. The new generation of youngsters wishes to join the Public Service Commission and hence to make them competitive they have opened a coaching centre having 22 students and teachers hired to train them. THI had also launched a farmer insurance policy as farming is a major activity and under this every farmer family is insured for Rs 50,000 if there is a death. It is like term insurance wherein an amount of Rs 100 per farmer is collected and in the event of death, the family gets Rs 50,000 and as the capital grows, the sum could be raised to even Rs 75,000 to Rs 1 lakh. Hospital has also grown from a thatched roof to offering secondary care with five more expert doctors to assist them. Currently, the hospital is managed by six doctors including a surgeon, an anesthesiologist and a gynecologist. Their friends and well wishers in the field of philanthropy offer them monetary support in time of need. Currently the hospital has evolved into a 30-bed facility, consists of a labor room with an attached ICU neonatal unit, a full-fledged Intensive care unit with a ventilator, an operating room outfitted with state of the art equipment and almost all investigations — like endoscopy, ultrasound scan, echocardiography — which are done in regular hospitals are performed. Subsequently, the hospital is also equipped with defibrillators and diagnostic tools including an ultrasound scan machine with Doppler technology. The hospital has facilities of nearby major city, Salem, and locals are free to pay what they can. The couple's two boys were homeschooled in Sittilingi till class 4 and instead of moving back to their native the boys prefer to settle in village. With regular renovations, the hospital added a separate building with an outpatient facility, a dental office, an x-ray room and a laboratory facility equipped to conduct tuberculosis and HIV testing in addition to blood analysis tests. The hospital has been made eco-friendly fueled by solar power and water pumps catering to 33 nearby villages and ambulance service in 21 villages, admitting about 1000 patients and conducting approximately 250 deliveries annually.

== Impact ==
The IMR (Infant Mortality Rate) in the region has come down to 30 deaths per 1000 live births from a staggering 150/1000. This is among the lowest in India. No Cases of malnutrition and maternal death is almost zero. THI also supports livelihood promotion by way of its craft and organic farming initiatives. Approximately 500 farmers are part of the Sittinlingi Organic Farmers' Association (SOFA) through which sustainable farming methods have been introduced to them. THI believes physical health as only a part of being and to be supported with mental and social health for the overall welfare of a society, they started a healthcare initiative in year 1992 and designed various development programmes for self sustenance of tribal population.

== Community Health ==
Till 2017 May, Tribal Health Initiative was supported by 55 medical professionals with an outreach in 33 surrounding villages. Regular monthly mobile clinics are sustained by health auxiliaries nominated by each village and THI's health workers and these mobile clinics conduct post and pre-surgical exams and routine checkups including hypertension screening in the villages on regular intervals. The mobile clinics have been playing a critical in reducing infant and maternal mortality and also alleviating the time and cost burden associated with healthcare as the mortality has decreased from 147 per 1000 to 20 per 1000 and women's participation in antenatal exams has increased from 11 to 90 percent since the initiation of the outreach programs by the THI. As THI stresses on the importance of prevention in maintaining health and to stress this concept its health workers regularly visit village schools to highlight the significance and importance of hygiene, cleanliness and nutrition along with other health related guidelines. Students of the villages and in school are also provided a fundamental understanding of various diseases and how to prevent them and special seminars are conducted on adolescent health and team of Tribal Health Initiative understands that development to support livelihood and nutrition is critical to safeguarding individual and community health of the villagers.

== Tribal Farming Initiative ==
THI had also initiated incorporating organic farming techniques that resulted in increase of their yields of healthier and qualitative food and also conserving natural resources. This initiative lead the farmers to relieve from the pressures of unnatural methods and who were forced to cultivate water exhaustive cash crops and rely on artificial fertilisers and pesticides as the tribals who originally enjoyed ample rain-fed sustenance were struggling under the demands of the modern consumer economy requirements. Till year 2017, around 200 farmers started practicing organic farming and half of them are certified to team up the Sittilingi Organic Farmers Association and the Sittilingi Valley Agricultural Development (SVAD) brand of organic products which is currently being sold in multiple cities in South India. THI also initiated methods to preserve almost extinct seeds such as millet through Seed Banks.

== Tribal Crafts Initiative ==
THI also initiated craft initiative which allows tribal women to preserve and sustain and grow on their cultural heritage and also financially supporting themselves and boosting the local economy through their inborn and natural skills. The Lambadi Tribal women and skill has an ancestral culture and tradition of intricate embroidery which is currently being learned by the younger women to create a unique collection of clothes and accessories through their talents. The crafts made by them are called "Porgai" meaning pride in the Lambadi dialect and is adopted and participated by at least 60 artisans under the ‘Porgai Artisans Association’ umbrella and THI helped initiate a women's self-help group that currently supports more than 200 pioneering entrepreneurs to manufacture and sell products such as millet biscuits and natural soaps in the open market which is organic, tasty and are of nice quality. The initiative helps in promoting fair and reasonable prices for products and also providing them with marketing opportunities and enabling the growth of the budding entrepreneurs to qualify for loans through their products. The Tribal Health Initiatives helped in supporting passionate and willing philanthropists and also served as an incubator for free and independently operated technology and educational initiatives which is committed for improving the lives and welfare of tribal communities in the region and surrounding places.

With its initiatives and efforts, THI had made strides in holistically elevating the hill tribes from the day of its inception and also ‘malevasis’ with support, trust, hard and dedicated efforts and compassion and strives to continue improving the quality of life of this underserved population by empowering them to be self-sufficient while restoring their lost sense of self-worth and pride and getting change in the society.
