= Maragatham Vetrivel =

Indian politician (born 1976)

Member of the Tamil Nadu Legislative Assembly
- Incumbent
- Assumed office 11 May 2026
- Preceded by: A. Govindasamy
- Constituency: Pappireddipatti

Personal details
- Born: 1976 (age 49–50) Dharmapuri, Tamil Nadu, India
- Party: All India Anna Dravida Munnetra Kazhagam
- Spouse: S. R. Vetrivel
- Education: Vellammal Higher Secondary School (12th Pass)

Maragatham Vetrivel (born 1976) is an Indian politician from Tamil Nadu. She is a member of the Tamil Nadu Legislative Assembly from Pappireddippatti Assembly constituency in Dharmapuri district representing the All India Anna Dravida Munnetra Kazhagam.

Vetrivel is from Dharmapuri, Dharmapuri district, Tamil Nadu. She married S. R. Vetrivel. She did her schooling at Vellammal Higher Secondary School, Chennai and passed Class 12 examinations in March 1994. She declared assets worth Rs. 24 crore in her affidavit to the Election Commission of India.

Vetrivel won the 2026 Tamil Nadu Legislative Assembly election from Pappireddippatti Assembly constituency representing the All India Anna Dravida Munnetra Kazhagam. She polled 1,01,829 votes and defeated her nearest rival, P. Palaniappan of the Dravida Munnetra Kazhagam, by a margin of 33,114 votes.
