= Kariamangalam =

Karimangalam
- Town
- Location in Tamil Nadu, India Karimangalam (India)
- Coordinates: 12.3060°N 78.2045°E
- Country: India
- State: Tamil Nadu
- Region: Kongu Nadu
- District: Dharmapuri

Area
  - Total: 11 km^{2} (4.2 sq mi)
- Elevation: 615 m (2,018 ft)

Population (2011)
  - Total: 13,511
  - Density: 1,200/km^{2} (3,200/sq mi)

Languages
  - Official: Tamil
- Time zone: UTC+5:30 (IST)
- PIN: 635111
- Telephone code: 04348
- Vehicle registration: TN-29

Karimangalam is a town and taluk headquarters in Dharmapuri district in the Kongunadu region of Tamil Nadu. It is located at 20 km from Dharmapuri and 70 km from Salem.

== Demographics ==
As of 2011 Indian census figures, Karimangalam had a population of 13,511. Males constitute 50% of the population and females 50%. Karimangalam has an average literacy rate of 58%, lower than the national average of 59.5%: male literacy is 67%, and female literacy is 49%. In Karimangalam, 12% of the population is under 6 years of age.
