= Palacode taluk =

Coordinates: 12.303°N 78.073°E

Palacode taluk is a taluk in the Dharmapuri district of the Indian state of Tamil Nadu. The headquarters of the taluk is the town of Palacode. Part of Cauvery North Wildlife Sanctuary is located in this taluk.

== Geography ==
Palacode is located on the northwest region of Tamil Nadu in Dharmapuri district with an average elevation of 533 meters above MSL. The terrain can be described as rolling in nature. The taluk extends to an area of 73,267 h.a, covering 16% of the district's total area. The various proportional area divisions are:

1. Forests - 31.86%
2. Barren Lands - 3.17%
3. Non Agricultural use -3.4%
4. Cultivable Waste Land - 0.35%
5. Permanent Cultivated Land and Grassland - 0.90%
6. Current Fallow - 1.74%
7. Other Fallow Lands - 0.65%

The taluk has reserves of black granite.

== Demographics ==
According to the 2011 census, the taluk of Palakkodu had a population of 345,906 with 178,514 males and 167,392 females. There were 938 women for every 1,000 men. The taluk had a literacy rate of 41.04%. Child population in the age group below 6 years were 20,954 males and 18,600 females.

== Some Important Places ==
=== Dharmapuri District Co Operative Sugar Mills Limited ===
This is a co-operative sugar mill established in the year 1971-72. The present crushing capacity of the mill is 2000 M.T. A polytechnic college (named Dharmapuri District Co-op. Sugar Mills Polytechnic College) was established in 1985 under the management of the sugar-mill.

=== Government Polytechnic College ===
The college was established by the state government in 2010 in Boomandahalli village and extends to an area of 5 acres. The Government College of Engineering, Dharmapuri is also functioning here temporarily.

=== Modhur village ===
A small village near Dharmapuri has been found to be archaeologically significant as historians have revealed that it has been inhabited since the Neolithic age, about 10,000 years ago.

Historians, who have been studying inscriptions and tools found in the area, are of the opinion that Modhur, situated about fifteen kilo metres from Dharmapuri town, was highly civilised and was most probably the capital for the Athiyaman kingdom. Stone hammers, grinding stones, rubbing stones, stone balls, and a terracotta statue of the mother goddess were excavated in the village.

Nearly 17 varieties of stones tools were used by the people of Modhur that dates back to a period about 10,000 years back. "The Neolithic people who lived here were highly civilised and there is evidence that the people were engaged in agriculture," said S Selvaraj, a retired regional assistant director, department of archaeology.

Modhur is an important historical site, situated about 15 km from Dharmapuri. The antiquity of Modhur village went back to the Neolithic age (about 10,000 years old). It had a succession of habitations. In the surface collection, the site yielded black and red ware, slipped ware and few grey pottery of the Megalithic period (about 3,000 years old). Two hero stone inscriptions of the Hoysala king were also found. More than 20 megalithic burials were found at Tirumalvadi, near Modhur. A Chola period inscription of the 10th century, which was found in the village, indicated that Chola kings had imposed tax for marriages.

=== Cauvery North Wildlife Sanctuary ===
On 12 March 2014, the Government of Tamil Nadu declared Cauvery North Wild Life Sanctuary under clause (b) of sub-section (1) of Section 26-A of the Wild Life (Protection) Act, 1972 in Gazette No.II(2)/EF/254/2014 covering the protected area of Palacode taluk of Dharmapuri forest division and Denkanikottai taluk of Hosur forest division in northern western Tamil Nadu.

== List of village panchayats ==
1. Adilam
2. Amanimallapuram
3. Annamalai Hally
4. Athimutlu
5. Baisuhally
6. Bandarahalli
7. Baragur
8. Battalahalli
9. Belamaranahalli
10. Bellarahalli
11. Bevuhalli
12. Bikkanahalli golasanahalli
13. Bodikuttapalli
14. Bolapakutthanahalli
15. Bommaandahalli
16. Bommahalli
17. Booganahalli
18. Boppidi
19. Budihalli
20. Chettihalli
21. Chikkadoranabetta
22. Chikkamarandahalli
23. Chinnagoundanahalli
24. Chinnamanahalli
25. Elumichanahally
26. Erranahalli
27. Erraseegalahally
28. Erukuttahalli
29. Eruthukuttahalli
30. Gidanahalli
31. Gudlanahalli
32. Gujjarahalli
33. Gummanur
34. Guttalahalli
35. Hanumanthapuram
36. Indamangalam
37. Jakkasamudram
38. Jarthalav
39. Jittandahally
40. Kalappanahalli
41. Kanavanahalli
42. Kandenahalli
43. Karagoor
44. Karagathahalli
45. Karimangalam
46. Karugkamaranahalli
47. Karukkanahalli
48. Kattanahally
49. Keragodahalli
50. Kondasamanahalli
51. Kottumaranahalli
52. Kumbarahally
53. Kuravandahalli
54. Mahendramangalam
55. Mallikuttai
56. Marandahalli
57. Maravadi
58. Modugulahalli
59. Molapannahalli
60. Mottalur
61. Mukkulam
62. Murukalnatham
63. Murukkampatty
64. Naganampatty
65. Nallur
66. Nammandahalli
67. Nariyanahalli
68. Nelamaruthahalli
69. P.Chettihalli
70. P.Gollahalli
71. Padi
72. Palacode
73. Panjapalli
74. Pappanaickanpatty
75. Patchikanapalli
76. Periyanahalli
77. Periyanur
78. Poonadanahalli
79. Pothalahalli
80. Pulikallu
81. Pulikarai
82. Rangampatty
83. Selliampatty
84. Samanoor
85. Sanganpasuvanthalav
86. Sekkodi
87. Senrayanahalli
88. Serandapuram
89. Serenahalli
90. Sethikanahalli
91. Sikkadoranabettam
92. Sikkarthanahalli
93. Soddanur
94. Thandukaranahalli
95. Thellanahalli
96. Thimarayanahalli
97. Thindal
98. Thirumalvadi
99. Thomalahalli
100. Thonenahalli
101. Thumbalahalli
102. Upparahalli
103. Velakalahalli
