= Nallampalli =

Coordinates: 12.0601°N 78.1128°E

Nallampalli is a Census town in Dharmapuri district in Tamil Nadu, India. It is the headquarters of Nallampalli taluk. It is just 10 km away from Dharmapuri city. Pincode : 636807

== Demographics ==
According to 2011 census, there are 1613 families living in this village. The total population of the village is 7079. The number of females is 3523 and the number of males is 3556. The total literacy rate of the village is 72.7% which is lower than the Tamil Nadu average literacy rate of 80.09%.
