= Pennagaram taluk =

Coordinates: 12.13°N 77.9°E

Pennagaram taluk is a taluk in the Dharmapuri district of the Indian state of Tamil Nadu. The headquarters of the taluk is the town of Pennagaram.

== Demographics ==
According to the 2011 census, the taluk of Pennagaram had a population of 234,406 with 123,101 males and 111,305 females. There were 904 women for every 1000 men. The taluk had a literacy rate of 57.62. Child population in the age group below 6 was 13,967 Males and 12,370 Females.
