= Karimangalam block =

Karimangalam block is a revenue block in the Dharmapuri district of Tamil Nadu, India. It has a total of 30 panchayat villages.

Karimangalam is located between Dharmapuri and krishnagiri, Karimangalam belongs to Dharmapuri dist. Karimangalam is located at NH 7. From Karimangalam to krishnagiri 23 towards Bangalore on North side, 22 km to Dharmapuri on south side.
