= Kadathur =

- Town panchayat
- Location in Tamil Nadu, India
- Coordinates: 12.08°N 78.28°E
- Country: India
- State: Tamil Nadu
- Region: Kongu Nadu
- District: Dharmapuri

Government
  - Type: Panchayat

Population (2011)
  - Total: 11,382

Languages
  - Official: Tamil
- Time zone: UTC+5:30 (IST)
- PIN: 635303
- Telephone code: 91-4346
- Vehicle registration: TN 29
- Nearest city: Dharmapuri
- Lok Sabha Constituency: Dharmapuri
- Assembly Constituency: Pappireddipatti
- Website: https://www.townpanchayat.in/kadathur

Kadathur is a panchayat town in Dharmapuri district in the Indian state of Tamil Nadu. Kadathur is situated 20 kilometres (12 mi) southeast of Dharmapuri. It is in the southern region of the district.

== Demographics ==
As of 2011 India census, It had a population of 11,382. Males constitute 51% of the population and females 49%. Kadathur has an average literacy rate of 66%, higher than the national average of 59.5%: male literacy is 75%, and female literacy is 56%. In Kadathur, 11% of the population is under 6 years of age. It is also one of the main revenue villages of Dharmapuri district.

== Transport ==
Kadathur has good roadway facilities and very frequent bus services available to Dharmapuri, Pappireddipatti, Bommidi, Salem and Harur. Nearest railway stations are Morappur and Bommidi(13 km). Nearest airport is Salem Airport. It has direct bus to Coimbatore and Tirupur. Many bus travel via Kadathur from Salem to Dharmapuri, Pappireddipatty to Bengaluru, Bommidi to Chennai, Dharmapuri to Chennai.
