= Pappireddipatti Assembly constituency =

State Legislative Assembly Constituency in Tamil Nadu

Coordinates: 11.911933°N 78.366004°E

Pappireddipatti
- Constituency No. 60 for the Tamil Nadu Legislative Assembly

Constituency details
- Country: India
- Region: South India
- State: Tamil Nadu
- District: Dharmapuri
- Lok Sabha constituency: Dharmapuri
- Established: 2008
- Total electors: 2,57,016

Member of Legislative Assembly
- 17th Tamil Nadu Legislative Assembly
- Incumbent Maragatham Vetrivel
- Party: AIADMK
- Alliance: NDA
- Elected year: 2026

Pappireddippatti is a state assembly constituency in Tamil Nadu, India, that was formed after the constituency delimitation in 2008. Its State Assembly Constituency number is 60. Located in Dharmapuri district, it comprises portions of Dharmapuri and Pappireddipatti taluks. It is included in Dharmapuri Lok Sabha constituency for elections to the Parliament of India. It is one of the 234 State Legislative Assembly Constituencies in Tamil Nadu, in India.

== Members of the Legislative Assembly ==
Year	Member	Political party
2011	P. Palaniappan	All India Anna Dravida Munnetra Kazhagam
2016	P. Palaniappan	All India Anna Dravida Munnetra Kazhagam
2019^	A. Govindasamy	All India Anna Dravida Munnetra Kazhagam
2021	A. Govindasamy	All India Anna Dravida Munnetra Kazhagam
2026	Maragatham Vetrivel	All India Anna Dravida Munnetra Kazhagam

== Election results ==
Vote share of winning candidates
2026	43.03%
2021	51.81%
2019 by-election	48.25%
2016	35.56%
2011	45.39%

=== Assembly election 2026 ===
2026 Tamil Nadu Legislative Assembly election : Pappireddippatti
Party	Candidate	Votes	%	±%
AIADMK	Maragatham Vetrivel	101,829	43.03%	New
DMK	P. Palaniappan	68,715	29.04%	▼6.27
TVK	Thilagavathi. S	57,619	24.35%	New
NTK	Archana Tamilaruvi	5,216	2.20%	▼1.25
NOTA	None of the above	677	0.29%	▼0.32
Margin of victory		33,114	13.99%	▼2.83
Turnout		237,164	92.28%	▲8.93
Total valid votes		236,621		
Registered electors		257,016		▼3.19
AIADMK hold		Swing	▼9.10	

=== Assembly election 2021 ===
2021 Tamil Nadu Legislative Assembly election : Pappireddippatti
Party	Candidate	Votes	%	±%
AIADMK	A. Govindasamy	114,507	52.13%	▲2.92
DMK	M. Prabhu Rajasekar	77,564	35.31%	▼5.15
AMMK	P. Palaniappan	15,863	7.22%	New
NTK	R. Ramesh	7,573	3.45%	▲1.66
MNM	Srinivasan	1,729	0.79%	▼0.33
NOTA	None of the above	1,338	0.61%	▼0.51
Margin of victory		36,943	16.82%	▲8.07
Turnout		221,276	83.35%	▼0.80
Total valid votes		219,656		
Rejected ballots		282	0.13%	▲0.13
Registered electors		265,487		▲4.56
AIADMK hold		Swing		

=== Assembly by-election 2019 ===
2019 Tamil Nadu Legislative Assembly by-election : Pappireddippatti
Party	Candidate	Votes	%	±%
AIADMK	A. Govindasamy	103,981	49.21%	▲13.65
DMK	A. Mani	85,488	40.46%	▲13.58
Independent	Rajendran. D. K	15,283	7.23%	
NTK	Sathish. S	3,783	1.79%	▲1.51
MNM	M. Nallathambi	2,374	1.12%	New
NOTA	None of the above	2,361	1.12%	▲0.42
Margin of victory		18,493	8.75%	▲2.66
Turnout		213,664	84.15%	▼1.69
Total valid votes		211,303		
Registered electors		253,903		▲4.33
AIADMK hold		Swing		

=== Assembly election 2016 ===
2016 Tamil Nadu Legislative Assembly election : Pappireddippatti
Party	Candidate	Votes	%	±%
AIADMK	P. Palaniappan	74,234	35.56%	▼9.83
PMK	A. Sathiyamoorthy	61,521	29.47%	New
DMK	M. Prabhu Rajasekar	56,109	26.88%	▼12.29
DMDK	A. Baskar	9,441	4.52%	New
KMDK	G. Ashokan	1,760	0.84%	New
NOTA	None of the above	1,467	0.70%	New
Margin of victory		12,713	6.09%	▼0.13
Turnout		208,904	85.84%	▲4.88
Total valid votes		208,754		
Rejected ballots		150	0.07%	▲0.01
Registered electors		243,367		▲16.70
AIADMK hold		Swing		

=== Assembly election 2011 ===
2011 Tamil Nadu Legislative Assembly election : Pappireddippatti
Party	Candidate	Votes	%	±%
AIADMK	P. Palaniappan	76,582	45.39%	New
DMK	V. Mullaivendhan	66,093	39.17%	New
Independent	M. Velu	18,710	11.09%	New
Independent	P. Shankar	2,130	1.26%	New
Independent	P. Moorthy	1,270	0.75%	New
BSP	P. Vaigundan	1,037	0.61%	New
Margin of victory		10,489	6.22%	
Turnout		168,826	80.96%	
Total valid votes		168,731		
Rejected ballots		95	0.06%	
Registered electors		208,543		
AIADMK win (new seat)				
