= Pennagaram =

Pennagaram Pennagram
- Town
- Location in Tamil Nadu, India Pennagaram (India)
- Coordinates: 12.13°N 77.9°E
- Country: India
- State: Tamil Nadu
- District: Dharmapuri
- Elevation: 493 m (1,617 ft)

Population (2011)
  - Total: 17,480
  - Density: 980/km^{2} (2,500/sq mi)

Languages
  - Official: Tamil
- Time zone: UTC+5:30 (IST)
- Postal code: 636810
- Vehicle registration: TN-29

Pennagaram is a town in Dharmapuri district in the Indian state of Tamil Nadu. It is the headquarters of Pennagaram taluk (sub-district).

== Geography ==
Pennagaram is located at 12.13°N 77.9°E. It has an average elevation of 493 metres (1617 feet). The famous tourist place Hogenakkal Falls, is 15 km from Pennagaram. Crocodile farm is available in Hogenakkal.

== Demographics ==
As of 2011 India census, Pennagaram had a population of 18,100. Males constitute 52% of the population and females 48%. Pennagaram has an average literacy rate of 60%, higher than the national average of 59.5%: male literacy is 67%, and female literacy is 52%. In Pennagaram, 13% of the population is under 6 years of age. It is very near (15 km) to Hogenakkal Falls in Pennagaram taluk, which is called India's Niagara.

== Administration ==
Panchayats are Perumbalai - Semmanur.

== Politics ==
Pennagaram assembly constituency is part of Dharmapuri (Lok Sabha constituency).

== Economy ==
Agriculture for the primary occupation in the area.

== Transport ==
RTO office located in Dharmapuri.

=== Roads ===
Pennagaram is a connected in three state highways in other district. There is bus service to Chennai, Bangalore, Salem, Erode, Dharmapuri, Pondichery, Krishnagiri, Hosur, Thirupattur, Tiruppur, Ramnagar and district other major cities. State highway 60h connected in Pennagaram-Dharmapuri-Thiruppattur.

=== Rail ===
The nearest railway station at Dharmapuri in 30 kilometers from Pennagaram.

== Education ==
- Govt Arts College Pennagaram
- Jayam college of engineering Nallanoor, Pennagaram
- Jayam arts & science college Nallanoor, Pennagaram
- Al-islamiah polytechnic college Rajavoor, Pennagaram
- Meenakshi arts & science college Eriyur, Pennagaram
- Govt Arts College Eriyur

== See also ==
- Tiger of Mundachipallam, man-eating tiger which operated around Pennagaram
