= Harur taluk =

Coordinates: 12.052°N 78.4855°E

Harur taluk is a taluk in the Dharmapuri district of the Indian state of Tamil Nadu. The headquarters of the taluk is the town of Harur.

== Demographics ==
According to the 2011 census, the taluk of Harur had a population of 240,357 with 122,216 males and 118,141 females. There were 967 women for every 1000 men. The taluk had a literacy rate of 61.63. Child population in the age group below 6 was 13,903 Males and 12,865 Females.

== List of villages in Harur Taluk ==
1. Annamalaippatti
2. Achalvadi
3. Agraharam
4. Agraharam
5. Alambadi
6. Ammapettai
7. Andipatti
8. Andipatti
9. Andiyur
10. Appiyampatti
11. Avallur
12. Avlampatti
13. Bairnayakkampatti
14. Bannikulam
15. Battalahalli
16. Bodinaickenhalli
17. Chandrapuram
18. Chellampatti
19. Chettikuttai
20. Chinnakoundampatti
21. Chinnapannimaduvu
22. Dasirihalli
23. Dodampatti
24. Elavadai
25. Ellepudayampatti
26. Ettipatty
27. Ganapathipatti
28. Gettupatti
29. Gobinathampatti
30. Gudalur
31. Harur (Municipality)
32. Ichampadi
33. Ilaiyampatti
34. Ittaiampatti
35. Ittalapatti
36. Jadaiyankombai
37. Jangalvodi
38. K. Vetrapatti
39. Kalladipatti
40. Kalladipatti
41. Kambalai
42. Kammalampatti
43. Kongavembu
44. Karapadi
45. Kattiripatti
46. Kattur
47. Kattavadichampatti
48. Kavaipatti
49. Kelapparai
50. Kilanur
51. Kilchengampadi
52. Kilmorappur
53. Kiraipatty
54. Kodamandapatti
55. Konampatti
56. Kondampatti
57. Kondayampatti
58. Kosapatty
59. Kothanampatti
60. Kottapatti Extension R.F.
61. Kottapatti
62. Kottapatti R.F.
63. Kottarapatti
64. Kudumiyampatti
65. Kulunthambinatham
66. Kumrampatti
67. Kurumbapatti
68. Kurumbapatti
69. Kurumbatti
70. Karuthampatti
71. Kuttipatti
72. M.Vetrapatti
73. Mambadi
74. Mampatty
75. Mandikulampatti
76. Mangalapatti
77. Marudipatti
78. Mattiyampatti
79. Mattiyampatti
80. Maveripatti
81. Meithangi
82. Melachengambadi
83. Melanur
84. Mettuvalasai
85. Mobirippatti
86. Mondukuli
87. Mookanurpatti
88. Morappur
89. Morasapatti
90. Mottayampatti
91. Mugilipatti
92. Nachanampatti
93. H.Nachanampatty
94. Nadupatti
95. Naripalli
96. Nariyampatt
97. Navalai
98. Nayinakavundampatti
99. Neruppandalkuppam
100. Obilinayakkanpatti
101. Pachanampatty
102. Palaiyam
103. Palayam
104. Palayampalli
105. Pallipatti
106. Panamarathupatti
107. Pappinayakkenvalasai
108. Pariayapatti
109. Periyapatti
110. Periyappannimaduvu
111. Ponneri
112. Poyyapatti
113. Pudinattam
114. Pudur
115. Purakkal Uddai
116. Rasalampatti
117. Reddipatti
118. Ramapuram
119. Runganavalasai
120. Sakkilipatti
121. Samanattam
122. Samandahalli
123. Sandappatti
124. Sekkampatti
125. Selambai
126. Sengandipatti
127. Sennampatti
128. Senrayampatti
129. Setrapatti
130. Sikkalur
131. Singilipatty
132. Sittilingi
133. Sittilingi R.F.
134. Sittilingi Extension R.F.
135. Soorapatti
136. Soriyampatti
137. Sundangipatti
138. Suramatham
139. Tadaravalasai
140. Tamaleripatti
141. Tamarakoliyampatti
142. Tambal
143. Tandekuppam
144. Tariasal
145. Thadampatti
146. Thambichettipatti
147. Thanippadi
148. Thathampatti
149. Thedampatti
150. Theerthamalai
151. Theerthamalai R.F.
152. Thekkanampatti
153. Thippampatti
154. Thoppampatti
155. Thoranampatti
156. Vadapatti
157. Vadugapatti
158. Valaduppu
159. valaithottam(rural site)
160. Vallimadurai
161. Vedakadamaduvu
162. Vedapatti
163. Velampatti
164. Velampatti
165. Velanur
166. Venakkampatti
167. Vengiampatti
168. Veppampatti Extension R.F.
169. Veppampatti RF
170. Veppanatham
171. Veppasennampatti
172. Virappanayakkampatti
