= Pappireddipatti taluk =

Coordinates: 11.911933°N 78.366004°E

Pappireddipatti taluk is a taluk in the Dharmapuri district of the Indian state of Tamil Nadu. The headquarters of the taluk is the town of Pappireddipatti.

== Demographics ==
According to the 2011 census, the taluk of Pappireddipatti had a population of 241,116 with 122,690 males and 118,426 females. There were 965 women for every 1000 men. The taluk had a literacy rate of 64.67. Child population in the age group below 6 was 11,754 Males and 11,071 Females.
