= Palakkodu =

Palacode Palacode
- Town panchayat
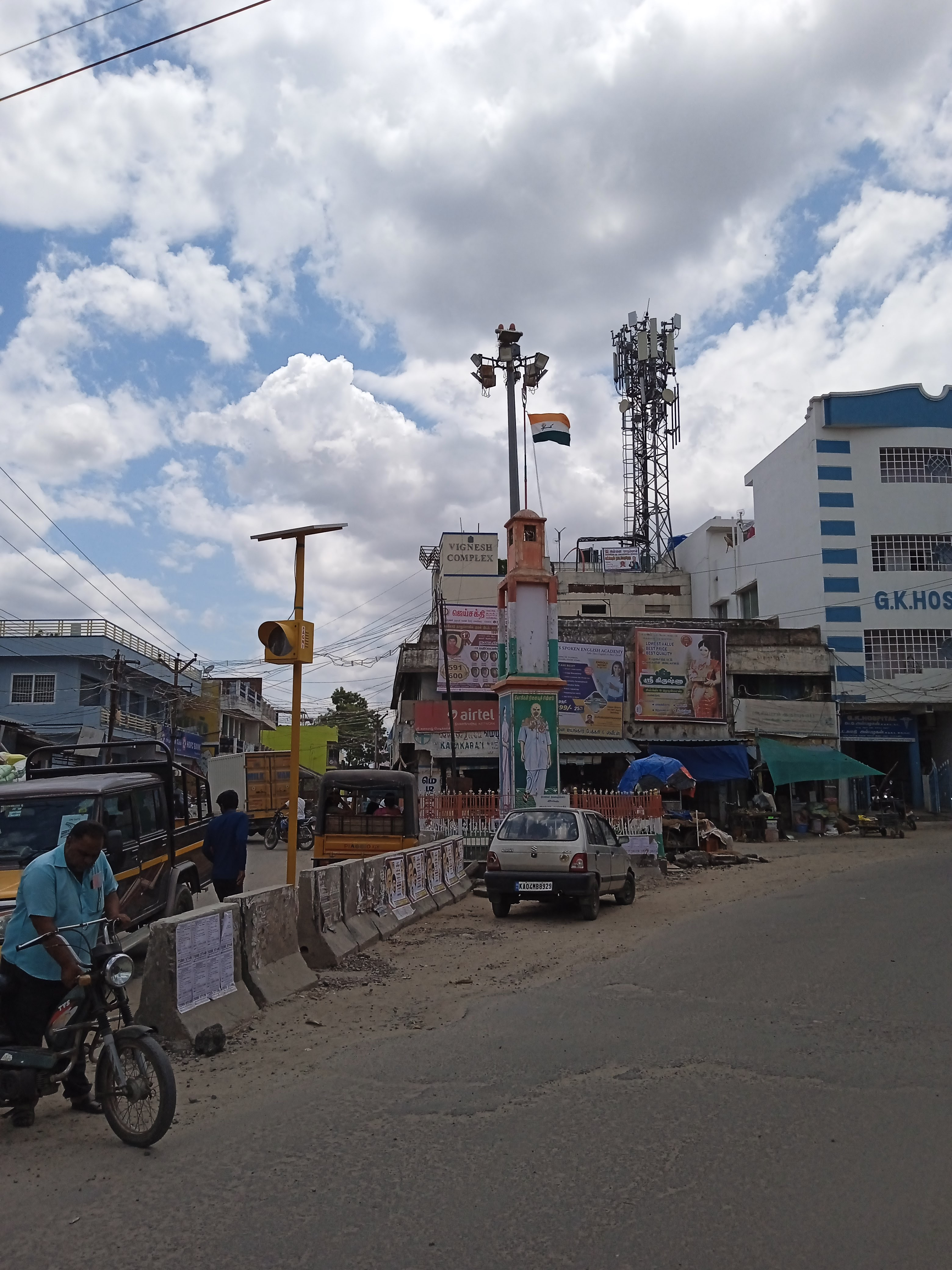
- Road Junction in Palacode

- Location in Tamil Nadu, India
- Coordinates: 12.303°N 78.073°E
- Country: India
- State: Tamil Nadu
- District: Dharmapuri
  - Rank: municipality
- Elevation: 533 m (1,749 ft)

Population (2011 to 2019)
  - Total: 20,959

Languages
  - Official: Tamil
- Time zone: UTC+5:30 (IST)
- PIN: 636808
- Vehicle registration: TN-29

Palacode (also known as Palakodu or Palacode) is a panchayat town in Dharmapuri district in the Indian state of Tamil Nadu.

== Geography ==
Palakkodu is located at 12.3°N 78.08°E. It has an average elevation of 533 metres (1748 feet).

== Demographics ==
As of 2011 India census, Palakkodu had a population of 20,959. Males constitute 51% of the population and females 49%. Palakkodu has an average literacy rate of 64%, higher than the national average of 59.5%: male literacy is 70%, and female literacy is 57%. In Palakkodu, 12% of the population is under 6 years of age.

== Politics ==
Palacode constituent assembly sends representative to the state assembly. For Lok Sabha it belongs to Dharmapuri Constituency.

== Banks ==
- State Bank of India
- Indian Bank
- Indian Overseas Bank
- Lakshmi vilas Bank
- Union bank of India
- Ujjivan Small finance bank
- Bank of Baroda

== School Colleges and Library ==
1. Wisdomland Matriculation School Karagadahalli Palacode

2. Jaisakthi matriculation higher secondary school palacode

3. Jaisakthi Hi tech CBSE school palacode

4 Jaisakthi kids school palacode

5.Govt polytechnic college palacode was Dharmapuri District Co-op Sugar Mills Polytechnic College,

6. Govt arts and science college, Palacode

7. Arunachalam arts and science college palacode

Palacode has a public library, located opposite BDO office. It has over 16,000 books and various journals.

== Railway ==
Palacode railway station, Marandahalli railway station
