= Morappur block =

Morappur block is a revenue block in the Dharmapuri district of Tamil Nadu, India. It has a total of 43 panchayat villages. It includes the railway station which is an important link between the east of Chennai and west of Salem and Coimbatore, and in Dharmapuri district. Morappur is also famous for the Chennakeshava Perumal Temple and Singara Velan temple. Morappur has a government hospital and good agricultural development.

Highlight of the Morappur is Singarathoppu Munishwarar, Every Month Lakhs of people Visiting the temple.

Nearest railway station is Morappur Railway station.
