= Harur =

- Town
- Nickname: Ariyur,
- Location in Tamil Nadu, India
- Coordinates: 12.0536°N 78.4814°E
- Country: India
- State: Tamil Nadu
- Region: Kongu Nadu
- District: Dharmapuri
  - Rank: Municipality
- Elevation: 350 m (1,150 ft)

Population (2025)
  - Total: 37,203

Languages
  - Official: Tamil
- Time zone: UTC+5:30 (IST)
- PIN: 636903
- Telephone code: 04346
- Vehicle registration: TN 29Z

Harur is a town in Dharmapuri district of Tamil Nadu, India. It is one of two revenue blocks in the district.

== Geography ==
The town is in northern Tamil Nadu, with an average elevation of 350 meters (1148 feet).

== Demographics ==
According to the 2011 Indian census Harur has a population of 25,469, 49.99 percent male and 50.01 percent female. Its literacy rate is 75.33 percent, higher than the national average of 59.5 percent. Male literacy is 82.34 percent and female literacy 68.32 percent. 11.72 percent of the population is under age six. Agriculture is the primary occupation. The main language spoken is Tamil.

== Transportation ==
RTO unit office is located in Harur.

=== Road ===
Harur is connected by one national highway, NH179A, two state highways, 6A and 60A, and many other district roads. There is bus service to Chennai, Salem, Coimbatore, Erode, Vellore, Tirupathi, Thiruvannamalai, Dharmapuri, Hosur, Thirupatur, Bengaluru, Madurai, Pappireddipatti. Harur has second Regional division office in Dharmapuri district.

=== Rail ===
The nearest railway station is at Morappur, 11 kilometres (6.8 mi) from Harur.

== Education ==
Government College of Arts and Science Dharmapuri, Affiliated to Periyar University Established Year 1965. There are more than 30 Educational institutions in and around Harur and Government Engineering Collage near harur since 2015 . HARUR became 32nd educational district in Tamil Nadu in 01.03.2018.

== Economy ==
There are at least 12 banks, 7 cash deposit machines and 20 ATMs in Harur.

== Mining ==
=== Granite ===
Harur is rich in high-quality gabbro, which is exported to Europe and North America.

=== Molybdenum ===
Molybdenum was discovered near Harur by the Ministry of Mines in 2004. It is the only natural source of the metal in India. The ability of molybdenum to withstand extreme temperatures without significantly expanding or softening makes it useful in applications involving intense heat, including the manufacture of aircraft parts, electrical contacts, industrial motors and filaments.

== Gallery ==
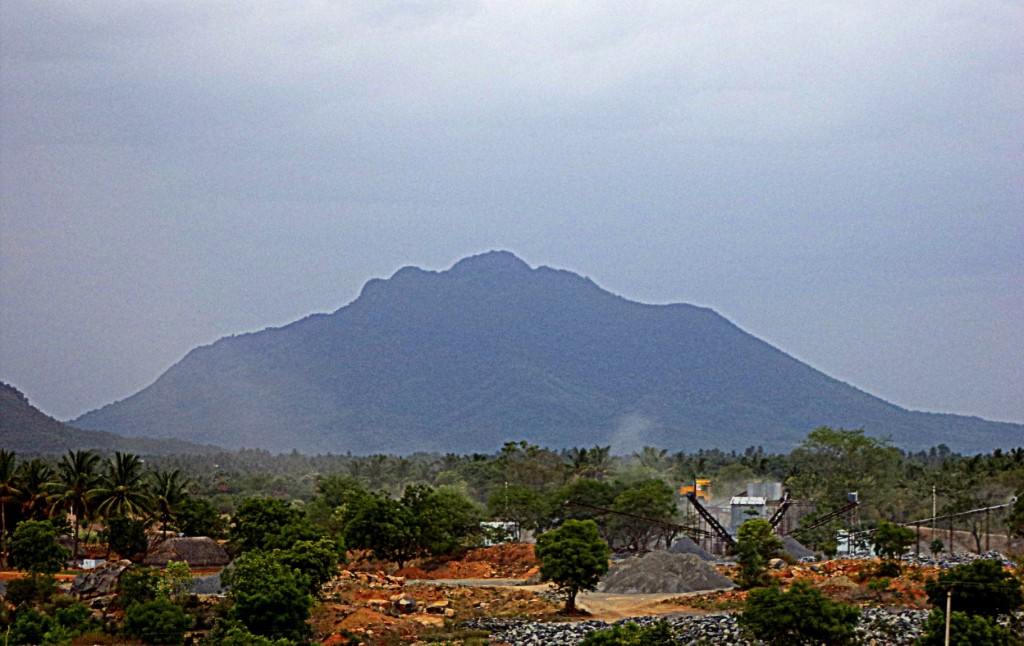

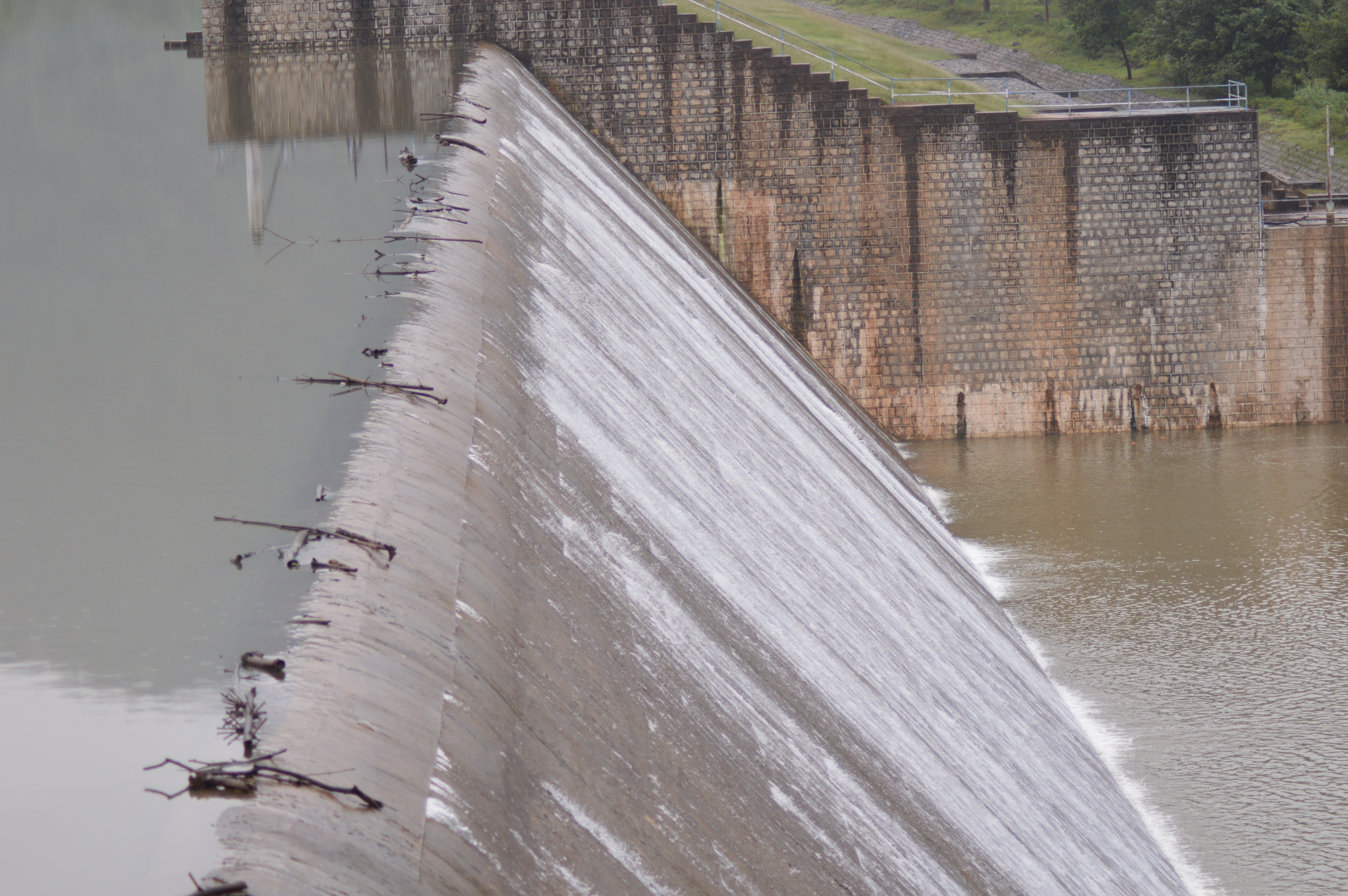
Vallimadurai Dam

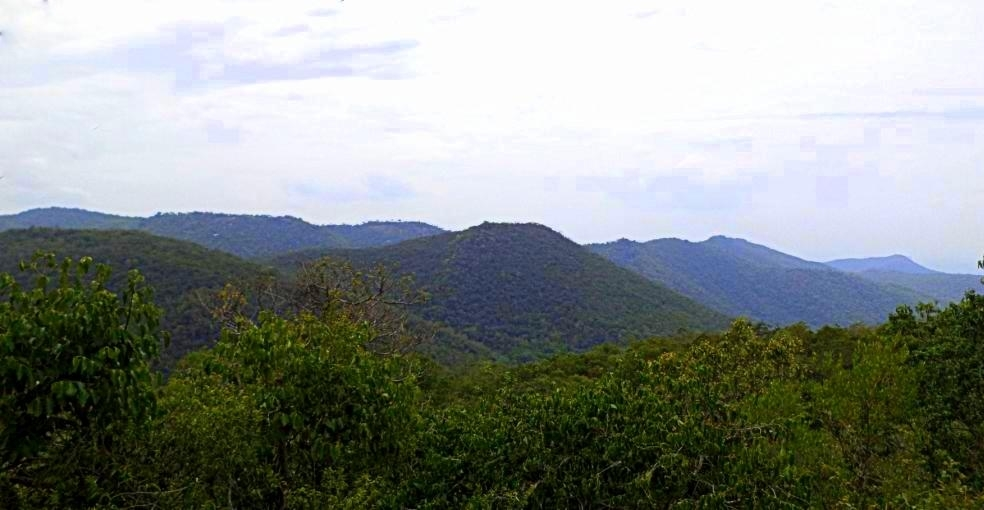
Sitheri Hills

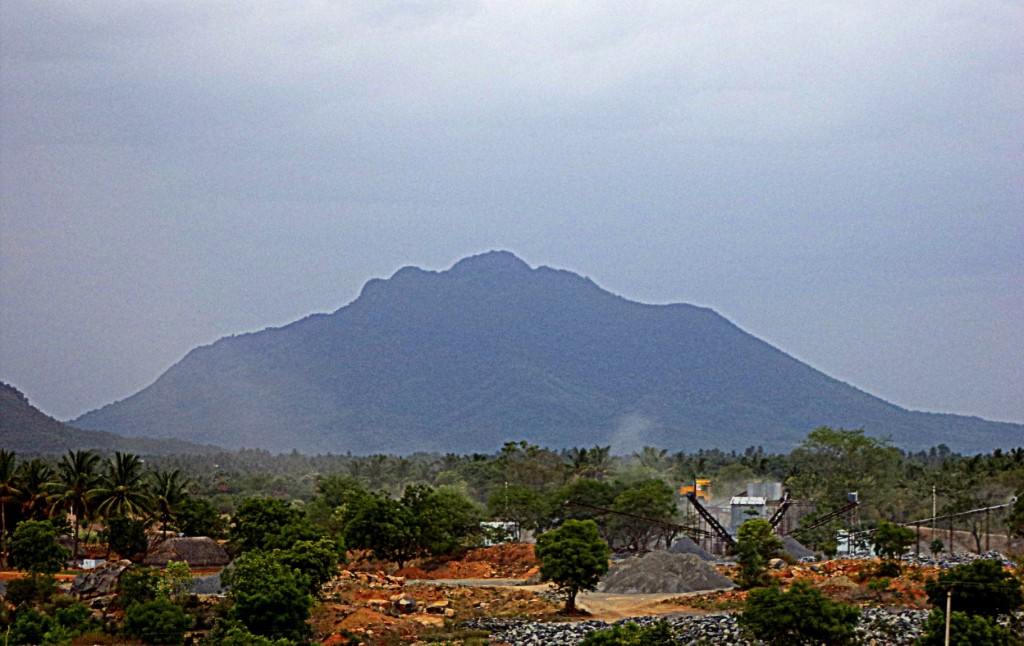
Theerthamalai
