= Dharmapuri district =

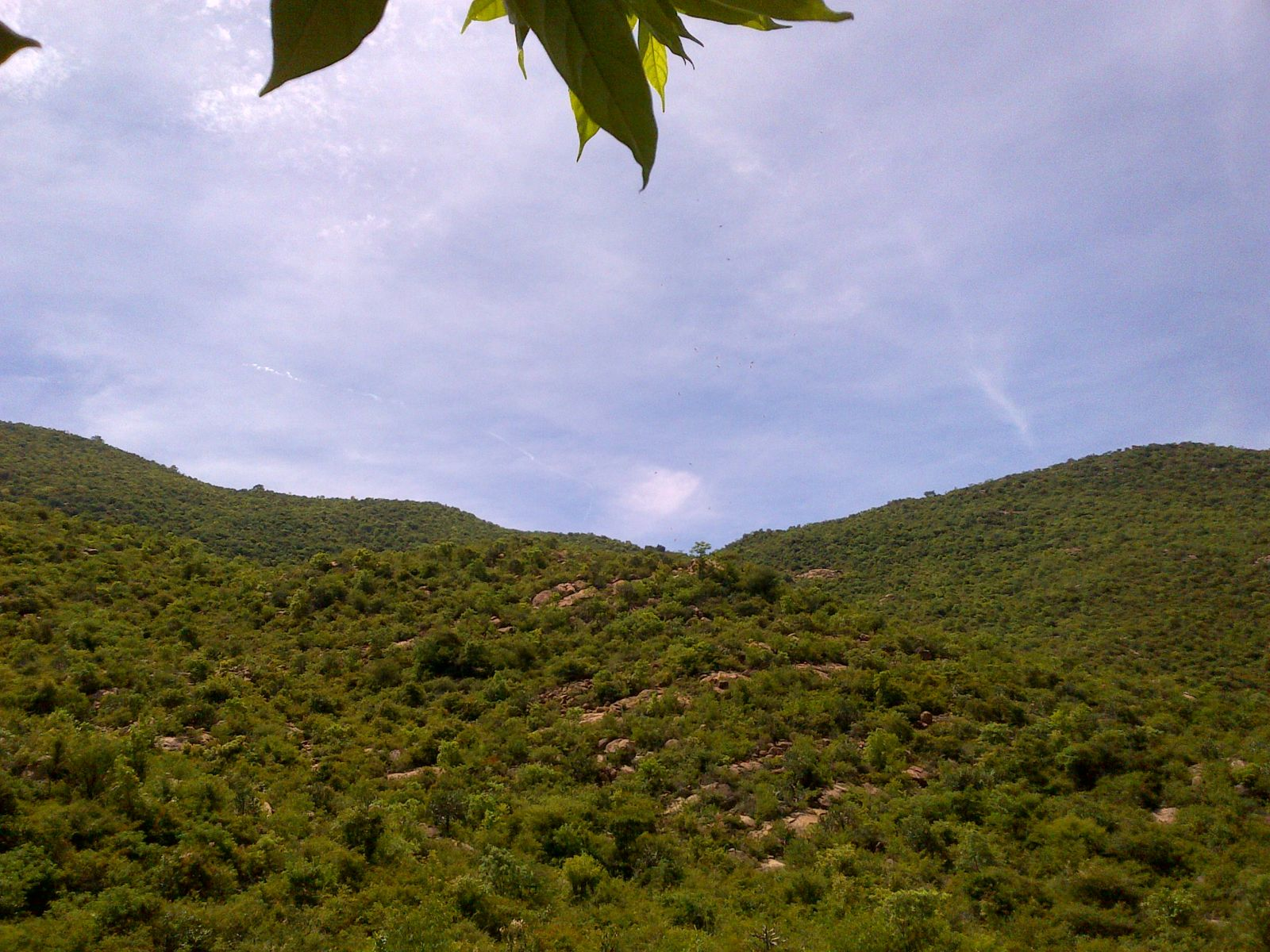
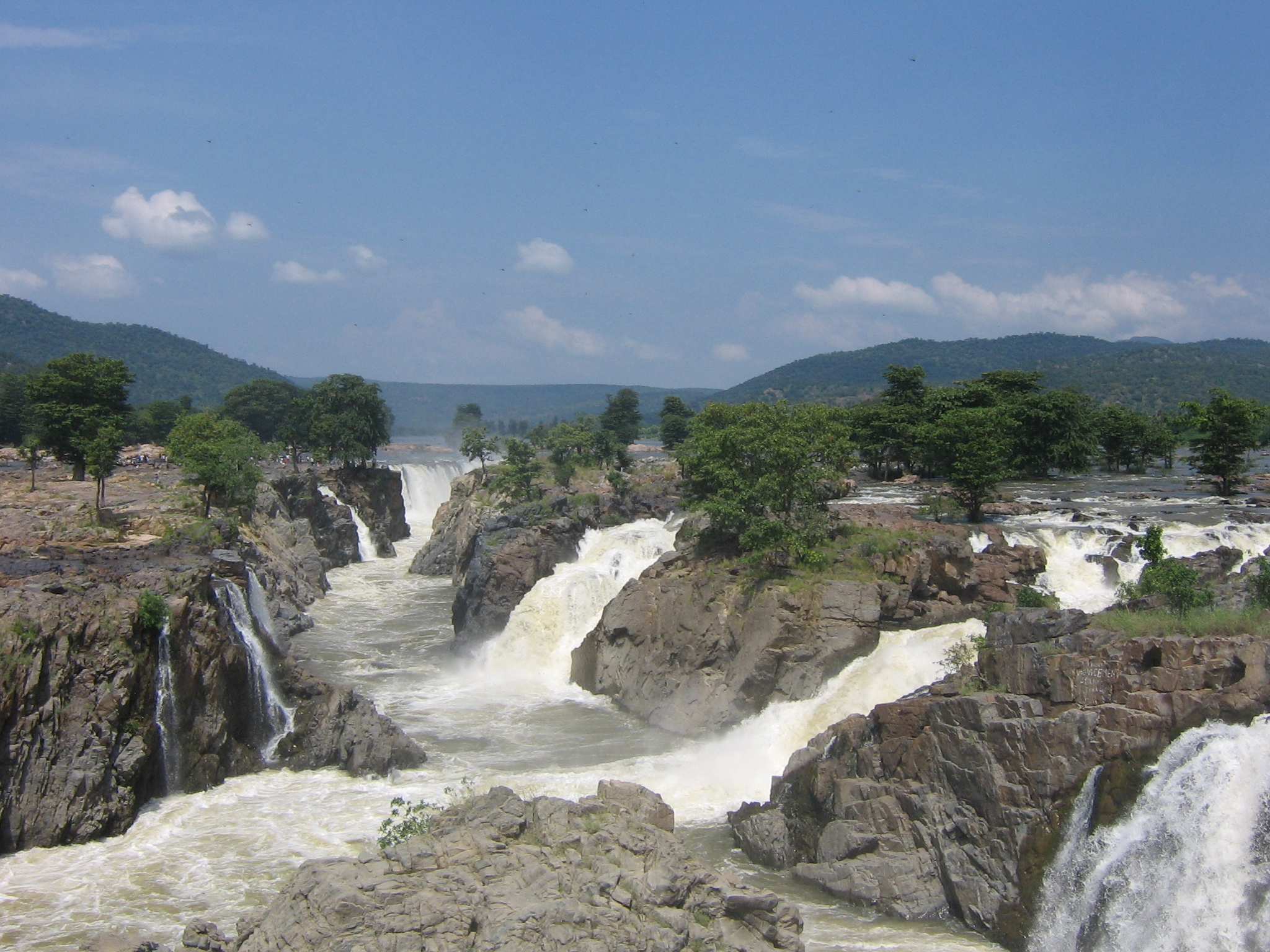
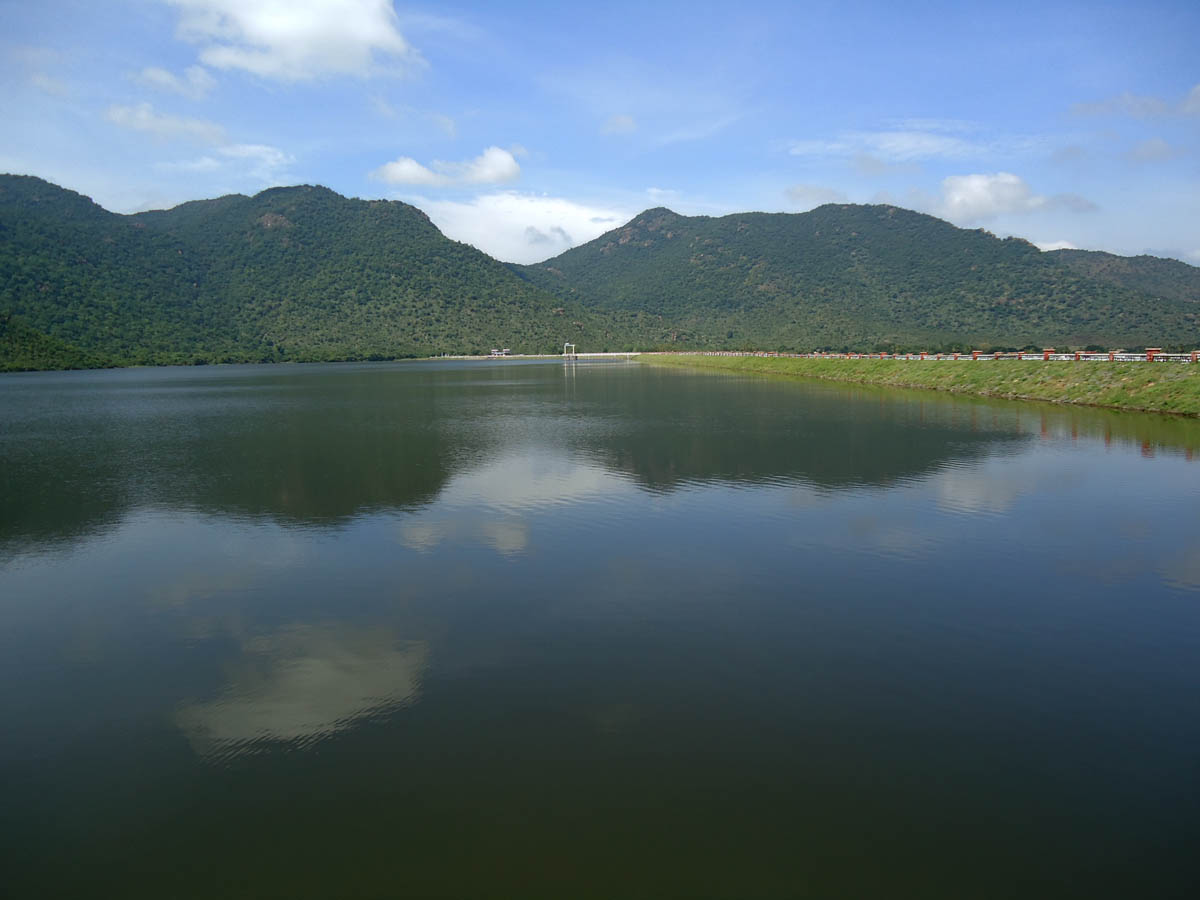
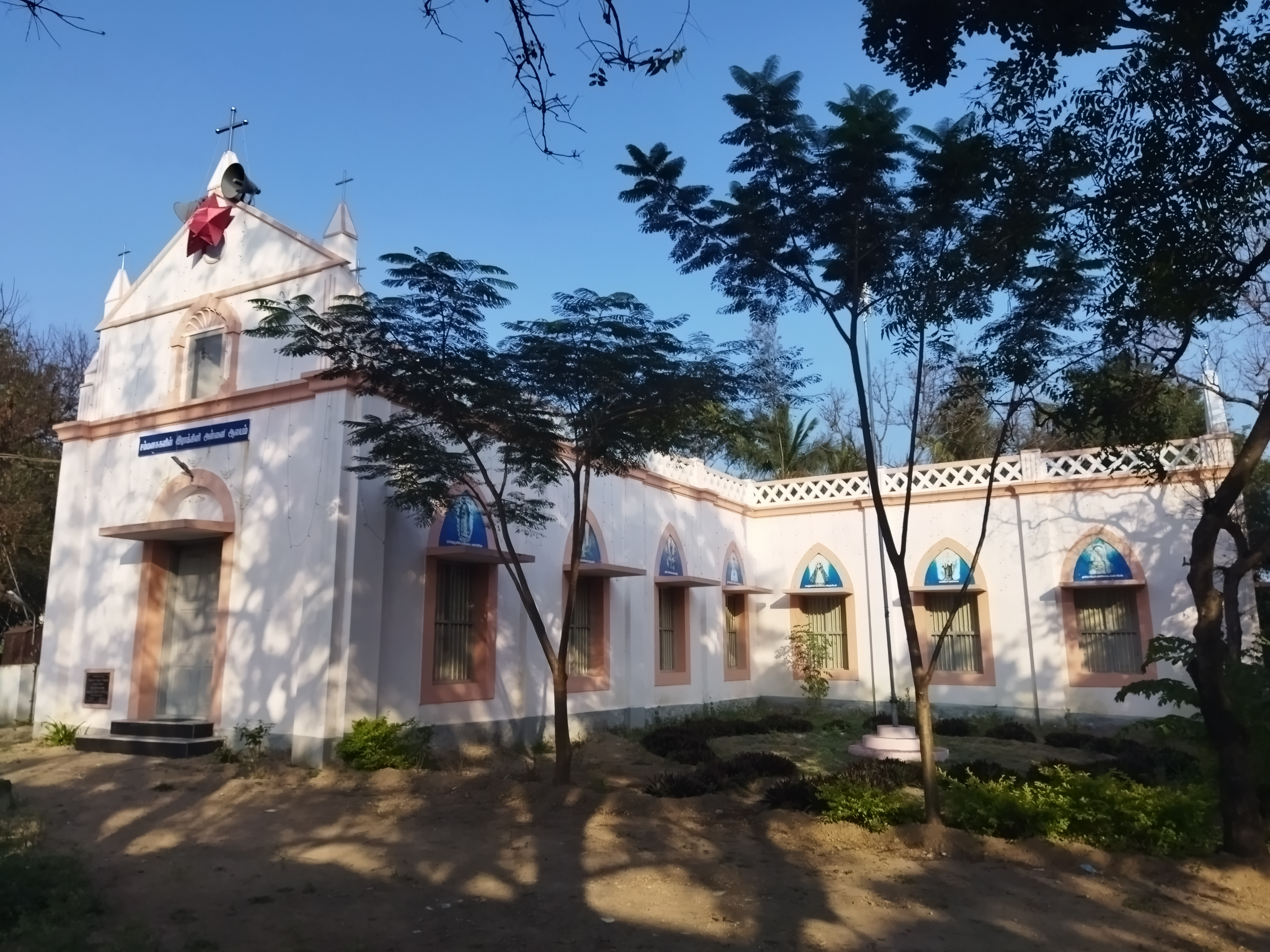
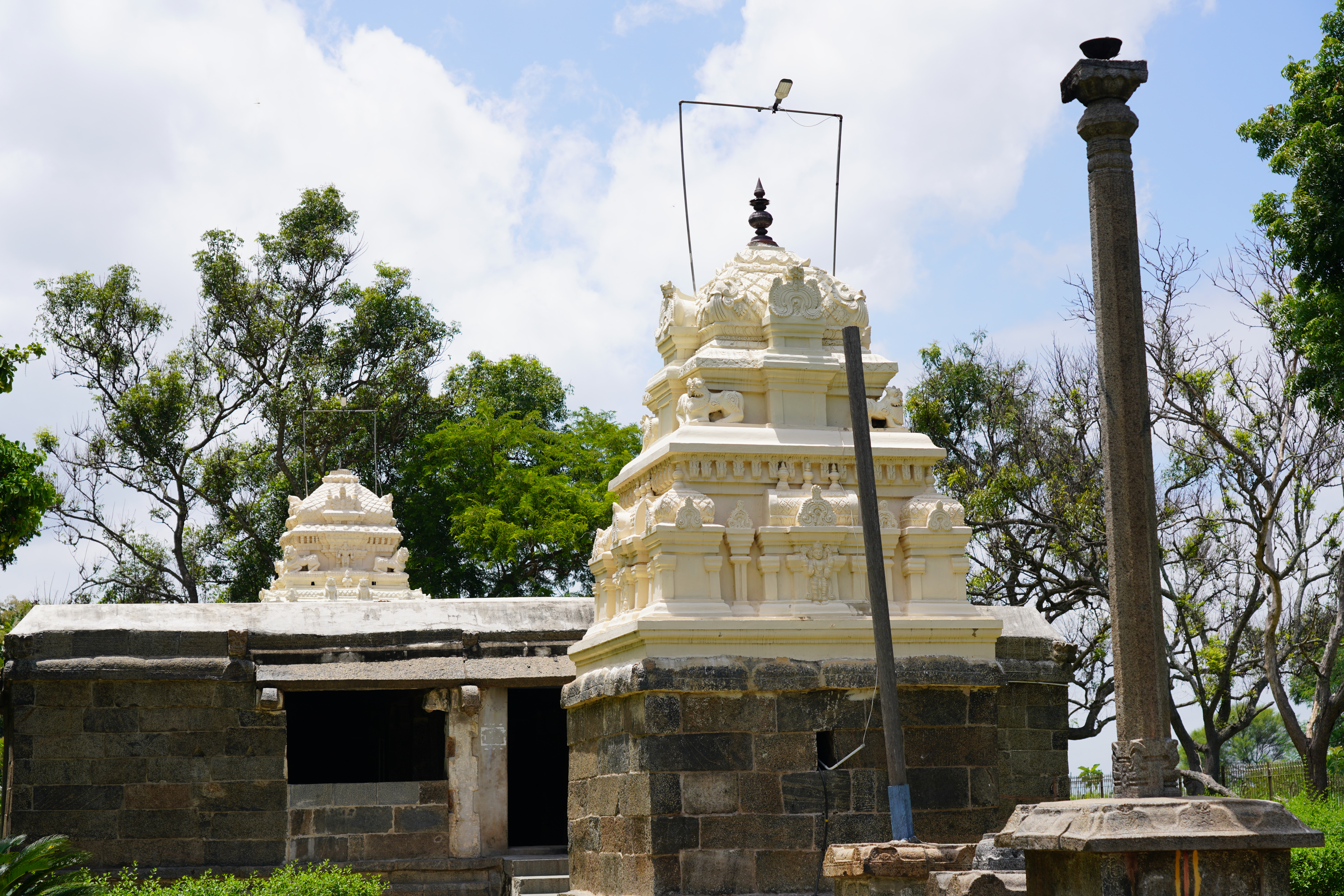
- Clockwise from top-left: Sri Kalyana Ramaswamy temple, Vathalmalai, Hogenakkal Waterfalls, St. Mary's Church in Kadagathur, Chenraya Perumal Temple, Vaiyar Dam near Pappireddipatti
- Interactive map of Dharmapuri district
- Coordinates: 12°7′33.6″N 78°9′14.4″E
- Country: India
- State: Tamil Nadu
- Established: 2 October 1965
- Founder: M. Bhakthavatsalam
- Headquarters: Dharmapuri
- Taluks: Dharmapuri, Nallampalli, Palakcode, Karimangalam, Pennagaram, Harur, Pappireddipatti, Eriyur

Government
  - District Collector: R.Sadheesh, IAS
  - Superintendent of Police: S.S.Maheswaran, I.P.S

Area
  - Total: 4,497.77 km^{2} (1,736.60 sq mi)
  - Rank: 11

Population (2011)
  - Total: 1,506,843
  - Rank: 24
  - Density: 335.020/km^{2} (867.698/sq mi)

Languages
  - Official: Tamil
- Time zone: UTC+5:30 (IST)
- PIN: 636(xxx)
- Telephone code: 04342
- ISO 3166 code: ISO 3166-2:IN
- Vehicle registration: TN-29
- Largest city: Dharmapuri
- Largest metro: Dharmapuri
- Central location: 12°7′N 78°9′E
- Website: dharmapuri.nic.in

Dharmapuri district is one of the 38 districts in the state of Tamil-Nadu, India. It is the first district created in Tamil Nadu after the independence of India by splitting it from then-Salem district on 2 October 1965. The district headquarters is Dharmapuri. Dharmapuri District is one of the major producers of mango in the state, fine quality granite is found in the district. It is also one of the main sericulture belts in the state. Around 30 percent of the district's area is under forest cover. Kaveri enters Tamil Nadu through this district. Dharmapuri district had the lowest literacy rate of 74.23% in Tamilnadu during the 2011 census.

== Etymology ==
Dharmapuri was called Thagadur during the Sangam era. The name Thagadur is derived from two Tamil words, Thagadu meaning iron ore, and ur meaning place. The name Thagadur was changed to Dharmapuri after the Sangam period, possibly during the period of the Vijayanagara Empire or the period of the Kingdom of Mysore. The name Thagadur is still used by some of the people of Dharmapuri.

== History ==
The region is believed to have been controlled by the Pallava dynasty in the 8th century. The Rashtrakutas took over in the 9th century. They were defeated by the Cholas in the 11th century, and subsequently the district came under the Chola sphere of governance.

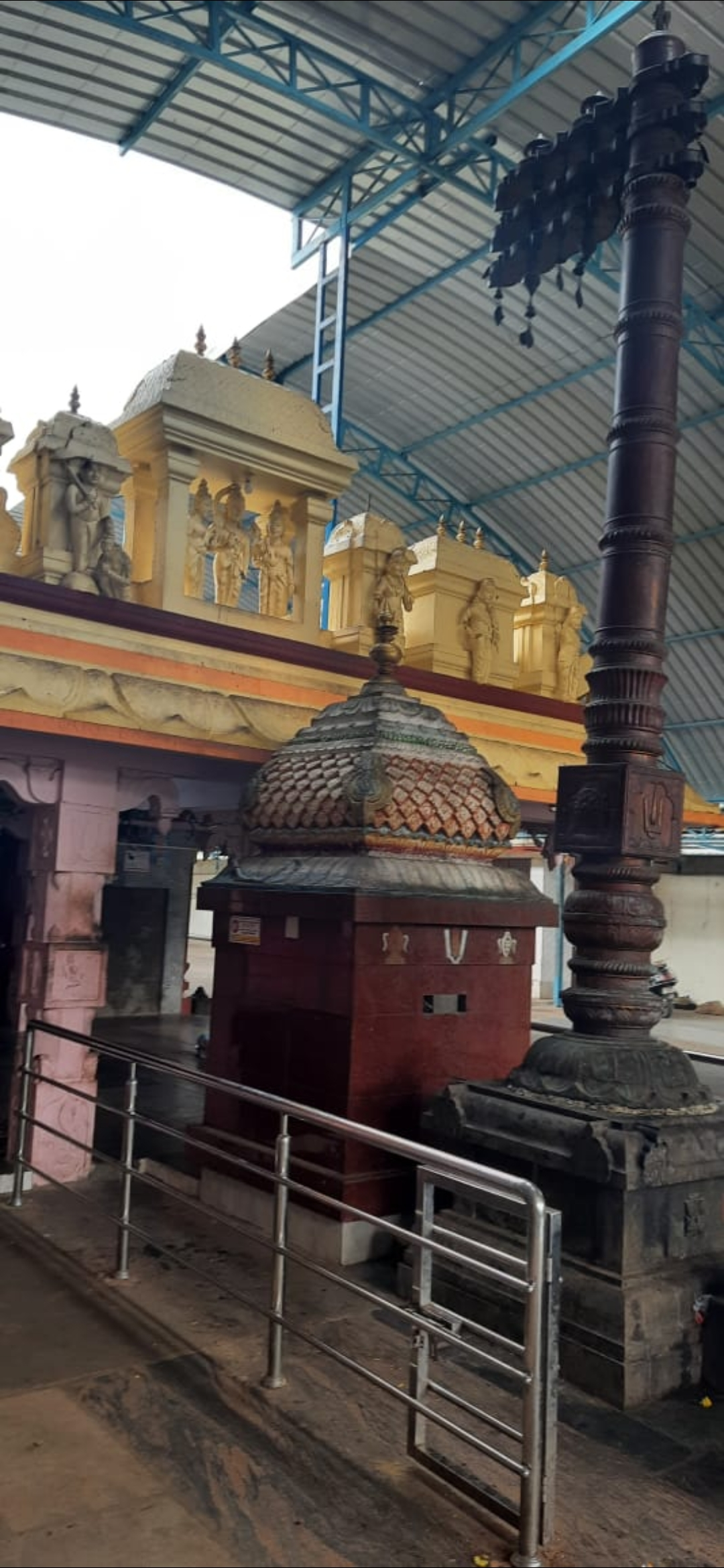
Adi Srinivasa perumal temple, Dharmapuri built by Pallavas

During 18th century, present-day Dharmapuri district was part of the Kingdom of Mysore and was called Baramahal. As part of the Treaty of Seringapatam (signed on 18 March 1792) after the Third Anglo-Mysore War, Tipu Sultan agreed to give part of his territories including present-day Dharmapuri district to the British East India Company which was then merged into the Madras Presidency an administrative subdivision of British India.

The present-day district was part of the Salem District under British rule, until the founding of Dharmapuri district on 2 October 1965. The Dharmapuri district was split into Dharmapuri and Krishnagiri districts in 2004. Many historical rock sculptures are found in this district. Modhur, a village near Dharmapuri has remains that date back to the Neolithic age. A government museum in Dharmapuri town displays some of these significant sculptures. Excavations at another village, Perumbalai, have unearthed artifacts dating back centuries.

== Geography ==
The district is located between latitudes N 11 47’ and 12 33’ and longitudes E 77 02’ and 78 40’. Occupies an area of 4,497.77 km^{2} (1,736.60 sq mi) (i.e. 3.46% of Tamil Nadu). It is bounded on the north by Krishnagiri District, on the east by Tiruvannamalai District and Kallakurichi district, on the south by Salem District, and on the west by Karnataka's Chamarajanagar District. The whole district is surrounded by hills and forests, and the terrain consists mostly of rolling plains.

=== Forests ===
The whole district is predominantly covered with forests. Spider Valley located near Hogenakkal is home to many wild animals. The district falls in the migratory path of elephants. Conflicts between man and elephant are most common in these parts. Many tribal communities depend on these forests. Vathalmalai, a mountain hamlet on top of Shervarayan hill chain has suitable conditions to cultivate coffee and jackfruit. Wild boars and spotted deer are commonly seen in Morappur and Harur forest region. Gaurs sometimes stroll near villages in the Bommidi region. Thoppur ghat has one of the area's scenic highways surrounded by mountains and forests.

Rivers and dams

Waterbodies in Dharmapuri - Pappireddipatti-Vaniyaru Dam is most important river and dam in this district. This river joined to Thenpennai river, Harur taluk, Chinnaru river Ramakkal Lake

== Governance ==
Dharmapuri is the district headquarters. The district has been divided into two revenue divisions, namely, Dharmapuri and Harur consisting seven taluks.

=== Administrative divisions ===
Municipality:

1. Dharmapuri,
2. Harur

Town Panchayats:

1. Bommidi
2. Kadathur
3. Kambainallur
4. Kariamangalam
5. Marandahalli
6. Palakkodu
7. Papparapatti
8. Pappireddipatti
9. Pennagaram
10. Koothapadi

Proposed Municipal Corporations:

1. Dharmapuri

Proposed Municipality:

1. Palakkodu
2. Pennagaram

Proposed Town Panchayats:

1. Nallampalli
2. Morappur
3. Thoppur

Panchayat Unions:

1. Dharmapuri
2. Harur
3. Nallampalli
4. Palacode
5. Pennagaram
6. Karimangalam
7. Morappur
8. Pappireddipatti
9. Kadathur
10. Eriyur

Revenue divisions:

1. Dharmapuri
2. Harur.

Revenue taluks:

1. Dharmapuri
2. Harur
3. Karimangalam
4. Nallampalli
5. Palacode
6. Pappireddipatti
7. Pennagaram.

== Demographics ==
Historical population
Year	Pop.	±% p.a.
1901	328,897	—
1911	344,203	+0.46%
1921	328,877	−0.45%
1931	383,902	+1.56%
1941	443,969	+1.46%
1951	499,582	+1.19%
1961	615,809	+2.11%
1971	796,404	+2.61%
1981	940,175	+1.67%
1991	1,123,583	+1.80%
2001	1,295,182	+1.43%
2011	1,506,843	+1.53%

According to 2011 census, Dharmapuri district had a population of 1,506,843 with a sex-ratio of 946 females for every 1,000 males, much above the national average of 929. A total of 167,940 were under the age of six, constituting 87,777 males and 80,163 females. The average literacy of the district was 91.2% compared to the national average of 72.99%. The district had a total of 375,873 households. Scheduled Castes and Scheduled Tribes made up 16.29% and 4.18% of the population respectively. There were a total of 751,170 workers, comprising 191,080 cultivators, 217,062 main agricultural labourers, 11,308 in house hold industries, 233,546 other workers, 98,174 marginal workers, 10,248 marginal cultivators, 50,283 marginal agricultural labourers, 4,033 marginal workers in household industries and 33,610 other marginal workers. 17.32% of the population lived in urban areas. The population of the district is roughly equal to the nation of Gabon or the US state of Hawaii.

Religions in Dharmapuri district (2011)
Religion	Percent
Hinduism	96.42%
Islam	2.54%
Christianity	0.94%
Other or not stated	0.10%

Languages of Dharmapuri district (2011)
1. Tamil (87.9%)
2. Telugu (6.51%)
3. Kannada (2.95%)
4. Urdu (2.26%)
5. Others (0.38%)

At the time of the 2011 census, 87.90% of the population spoke Tamil, 6.51% Telugu, 2.95% Kannada and 2.26% Urdu as their first language.

== Politics ==
District	No.	Constituency	Name	Party	Alliance	Remarks
Dharmapuri	57	Palacode	K. P. Anbalagan	AIADMK	NDA	Supported TVK; Later declared support for EPS
Dharmapuri	58	Pennagaram	S. Gajendran	TVK	TVK+	
Dharmapuri	59	Dharmapuri	Sowmiya Anbumani	PMK	NDA	
Dharmapuri	60	Pappireddipatti	Maragatham Vetrivel	AIADMK	NDA	Supported TVK; Later declared support for EPS
Dharmapuri	61	Harur (SC)	V. Sampathkumar	AIADMK	NDA	Opposed TVK

== Economy ==
=== Agriculture ===
Dharmapuri and Krishnagiri districts account for more than 60% to 70% total mango production in Tamil Nadu. It is a major producer of Ragi and saamai crops in the state. Exotic crops like dates are also being cultivated by some farmers in the areas around Ariyakulam.

Crop	Area under cultivation (in hect.)	in %
Paddy (Sornavari / Kuruvai / Kar / Samba / Thallady / Pisanam/ Navarai / Kodai)	9,465	5.60%
Millets (Ragi)	18,243	10.80%
Other Minor Millets	69,162	40.90%
Pulses	40,441	23.90%
Sugar Cane	11,971	07.10%
Mango	6,506	03.80%
Coconut	7,037	04.20%
Tamarind	1,197	00.70%
Other Crops	5,067	03.00%
Total	1,69,089	100%

Kaveri river, Ponnaiyar river, Thoppaiyaru river, Chinnar river, Nagavathy river, Vanniyar river and Sanathkumara river are the major water sources but mostly Agriculture here is dependent on groundwater resources and Tank Irrigation

== See also ==
- Tribal Health Initiative
- List of districts of Tamil Nadu
