= Davi =

Davi may refer to:

- Davi (Pashtun tribe), a Pashtun tribe of central Asia
- DAVI, the Dutch Automated Vehicle Initiative

Davi is also a variant of the name David. Notable people with this name include:

== Given name ==
- Davi (footballer, born 1944), full name David Benedito Magalhães, Brazilian footballer
- Davi Banda (born 1983), Malawian footballer
- Davi Brandão (born 1997), Brazilian politician
- Davi Cortes da Silva (born 1963), Brazilian footballer
- Davi José Silva do Nascimento (born 1984), Brazilian footballer
- Davi Kopenawa Yanomami (born 1956), Brazilian activist
- Davi Mbala (born 1993), Congolese footballer
- Davi Napoleon (born 1946), American theater historian and critic
- Davi Paes Silva (born 1945), Brazilian religious leader
- Davi Rancan (born 1981), Brazilian footballer
- Davi Ribeiro de Carvalho (born 1979), Brazilian futsal player
- Davi Rodrigues de Jesus (born 1984), Brazilian footballer
- Davi Sacer (born 1975), Brazilian Christian singer

== Surname ==
- Arnau Brugués Davi (born 1985), Spanish tennis player
- Hendrik Davi (born 1977), French politician
- Guido Davì (born 1990), Italian footballer
- Mara Davi, American actress
- Robert Davi (born 1953), American actor

== See also ==
- Daffy (disambiguation)
- Darvi (disambiguation)
- Davie (disambiguation)
- Davis (disambiguation)
- Davy (disambiguation)
- Devi (disambiguation)
