= G. K. Mani =

Indian politician

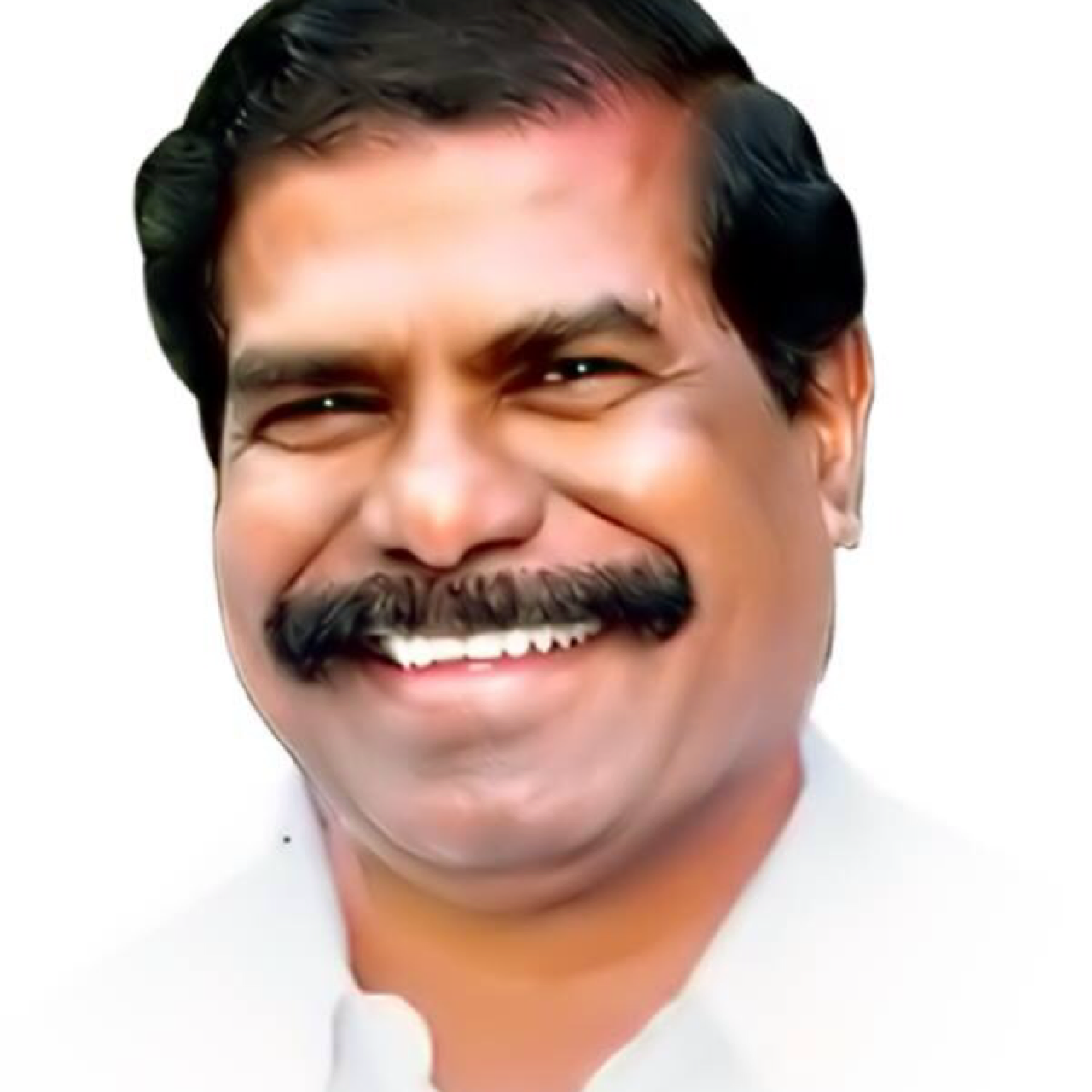

Honorary President of Pattali Makkal Katchi
- In office 28 May 2022 – 26 December 2025
- President: Anbumani Ramadoss
- Leader: S. Ramadoss
- General Secretary: Vadivel Ravanan
- Preceded by: position established

President of Pattali Makkal Katchi
- In office 31 December 1997 – 28 May 2022
- Leader: S. Ramadoss
- General Secretary: Vadivel Ravanan
- Preceded by: Dheeran
- Succeeded by: Anbumani Ramadoss

Member of the Tamil Nadu Legislative Assembly
- In office 2 May 2021 – 4 May 2026
- Chief Minister: M. K. Stalin
- Preceded by: P. N. P. Inbasekharan
- Succeeded by: S. Gajendran
- Constituency: Pennagaram
- In office 11 May 2006 – 13 May 2011
- Chief Minister: M. Karunanidhi
- Preceded by: S. Sundarambal
- Succeeded by: S. R. Parthiban
- Constituency: Mettur
- In office 10 May 1996 – 11 May 2006
- Chief Minister: M. Karunanidhi; J. Jayalalithaa
- Preceded by: V. Purushothaman
- Succeeded by: P. N. Periannan
- Constituency: Pennagaram

Personal details
- Born: 6 March 1952 (age 74) Govindapadi Village, Salem, Tamil Nadu, India
- Party: Pattali Makkal Katchi (till 2025; June 2026–Present)
- Other political affiliations: Anaithindhiya Jananayaka Padhugappu Kazhagam (2025–2026)
- Spouse: Unknown
- Children: 1 son (G. K. M. Tamil Kumaran)
- Parent: Govindapadi Kanthasami Gounder (father)
- Occupation: Politician

Govindapadi Kanthasami Mani, popularly known as G. K. Mani, is an Indian politician from Tamil Nadu. He served as the president of Pattali Makkal Katchi, a caste-based political party in Tamil Nadu, from 1997 to 2022. G. K. Mani's was proposed to be the Party President by PMK founder Dr. S. Ramadoss during the party's general body meeting in 1997. Later that year he was elected as the Party's President.

G. K. Mani, was born in Govindapadi Village, Kolathur, Salem District, and belongs to the Vanniyar community. His involvement in social work began as teacher in a Govt. Aided School in his village. He subsequently joined the Social Service Society (SSS), which was later merged with the Vanniyar Sangam, a social organization founded by Dr. S. Ramadoss that aimed to provide the Vanniyar community with social and economic mobility.

In 1986, G. K. Mani, was first one to be elected as Union Chairman for Kolathur under the Vanniyar Sangam Banner. He is the first political representative from Vanniyar Sangam even before the PMK party was formed, and was a member of the Tamil Nadu Legislative Assembly from Pennagaram constituency, having been elected most recently in the 2021 Tamil Nadu Assembly Elections. He had represented Pennagaram three times; he was first elected in 1996, reelected in 2001, and again 2021. He was also elected once from Mettur constituency in 2006.

When PMK broke in 2025 he alliened himself with Ramadoss faction, Ayya Pattali Makkal Katchi.
