= Kiran Shankar Roy =

Indian politician (1891-1949)

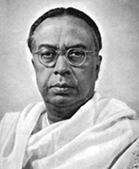

Home Minister (Police and Jails) of West Bengal
- In office 7 May 1948 – 20 February 1949
- Governors-General: Louis Mountbatten, 1st Earl Mountbatten of Burma; Chakravarti Rajagopalachari
- Premier: Bidhan Chandra Roy
- Preceded by: Position established

1st Leader of the Opposition of Pakistan
- In office 10 August 1947 – 6 May 1948
- Leader: Muhammad Ali Jinnah
- Preceded by: Position established
- Succeeded by: Dhirendranath Datta

Personal details
- Born: 25 October 1891 Shivalaya, Bengal, British India
- Died: 20 February 1949 (aged 57) Calcutta, West Bengal, India
- Citizenship: British India (1891–1947); Pakistan (1947–1948); India (1948–1949)
- Party: Indian National Congress
- Other political affiliations: Swaraj Party (1922–1933); Pakistan National Congress (1947–1948)
- Spouse: Padma Roy
- Children: Kalyan Roy
- Relatives: Raja Shyama Sankar; Parbati Sankar Roy Choudhury; Tapan Raychaudhuri (nephew); Kumar Sankar Ray (cousin)
- Education: University of Oxford; Lincoln's Inn (did not complete)
- Occupation: Professor; minister; writer; freedom fighter; barrister
- Known for: United Bengal proposal

Kiran Shankar Roy, also credited as Kiron Sankar Roy (Kiy-ron Shan-kor Roi; 25 October 1891 – 20 February 1949) was an Indian politician, academic, and freedom fighter. He was one of the leading figures of the Swaraj Party in the anti-British independence movement of the Indian subcontinent and one-time colleague of Subhas Chandra Bose and associate of Sarat Chandra Bose. He was one of Bengal's big five prominent Congress leaders during the two decades 1920s and 1940s. Roy was also a Leader of the Congress Parliamentary Party in the Bengal Assembly

== Early life ==
Kiran Shankar Roy was born to Hara Sankar Roy on October 25, 1891, in a Bengali zamindar family of Teota village of Shivalaya Upazila, Manikganj District of Bangladesh. His early education was at Teota Academy, a village school. Later he studied at Hindu School and St. Xavier's College, Calcutta and later Bangabasi College where he studied intermediate arts.

During his time in college, Roy was influenced by the radical nationalist movement during the First Partition of Bengal. To keep him away from participating in the movement, his family sent him to England to pursue his higher education. He studied history at New College, Oxford in 1909 where he was a prominent member of the Oxford Indian Majlis and was appointed its President for a term. He returned to the country in 1914 and taught history at Presidency College and Sanskrit College.

But as protested against the Rowlatt Act, he resigned in displeasure with the British Ruler and went to England to study law again in 1919 at Lincoln's Inn but did not complete the course. He returned home as a barrister and joined the Indian National Congress in 1921. He became Vice-Principal and Professor of English Literature at National College (Calcutta Vidyapeeth). Subhash Chandra Bose was the principal at that time. Later became the Vice-Chancellor of the National University (Gauriya Sarva-Vidyayatana).

== Political career ==
=== Political activities (1921–1946) ===
In 1921, Roy became actively involved in the Indian independence movement and participated in the non-cooperation movement under the leadership of Chittaranjan Das. During this period, he was detained by the British authorities for writing a seditious article. But in 1922, when the non-cooperation movement was withdrawn and the Alternative Swaraj Party was formed under the leadership of Chittaranjan Das and Motilal Nehru, he was one of the five main members of the party. In 1923 he became the party's secretary. Roy had been a member of the Bengal Provincial Congress Committee and the All-India Congress Committee since 1922 and held important positions both in parliamentary and non-parliamentary wings. He was Leader of the Congress Party, and Leader of the Opposition, in the Bengal Assembly in the late 1930s and 1940s. He was arrested and imprisoned in the Civil Disobedience Movement in Colonial India.

He re-joined the Indian National Congress in 1933 and was elected to the Bengal Legislative Assembly as a member of the Congress. He worked as a colleague of Subhas Chandra Bose and later became the secretary of the Ad. Hoc Congress Committee.

After the 1946 Indian provincial elections, Roy led Congress negotiations with Huseyn Shaheed Suhrawardy to form a Muslim-League coalition government but negotiations broke down due to disputes over issues such as the release of political prisoners and distribution of ministerial offices between Congress and the Muslim League coalesced with opposition to a Congress-Muslim League coalition by the Congress and Muslim League high command. Roy critiqued Suhrawardy for his complicity in the Direct Action Day communal riots in Calcutta. Roy also was elected to the Constituent Assembly in 1946 on a Congress party ticket.

=== United Bengal (1947) ===
Like Sarat Chandra Bose, Roy was vehemently and persistently opposed to the partition of Bengal and was naturally a supporter of the Provincial Coalition Party and Forward Bloc Congress led by Sarat Bose. Roy was against C.R. Rajagopalachari's 1944 Rajaji formula which essentially conceded Pakistan on condition that it come about with plebiscites in Muslim-majority regions and the Partition of Punjab and Bengal. Kiran Shankar supported Sarat Bose's United Bengal scheme, which was in turn supported by Suhrawardy and Abul Hashim. Roy nonetheless had doubts about the viability of an independent Bengal at first but was converted to it. Roy supported Frederick Burrows and Louis Mountbattens proposal for the representative coalition government and joint electorates in Bengal. However, the United Bengal scheme failed given it had no mass support among Hindus and Muslims in Bengal, despite Bose and Suhrawardy's initial insistence that most people in Bengal (including Hindus) were against Partition. The Bengal Provincial Congress and Indian National Congress high command led by Sardar Vallabhbhai Patel vehemently opposed the defiant and lone efforts of Bose and Roy in agitating against the Partition of Bengal in 1947, calling for them to conform to Congress's official policy. Whilst Muhammad Ali Jinnah initially provided tacit support to the United Bengal scheme, the All-India Muslim League high command would also oppose the scheme with the Nazimuddin faction, in contrast to the Suhrawardy faction, of the Bengal Provincial Muslim League supporting Partition and inclusion in a unitary Pakistan.

=== Last years (1947–1949) ===
After independence, he also became the Congress party leader in the East Bengal Legislative Assembly and Pakistan Constituent Assembly. However, he returned to India in 1948 and took charge of the Home Minister in the Cabinet of Ministers of West Bengal led by Bidhan Chandra Roy, who invited him to join his government. As Home Minister Roy banned the Communist Party in West Bengal and swiftly pushed through a West Bengal Security Act which was even more draconian than the one it replace. He died on 20 February 1949.

== Key writings ==
Kiran Shankar Roy, alongside his political career, was interested in literature. He was a prominent member of the Sabuj Patra Patrika edited by Pramatha Chaudhuri and the Monday Club by Sukumar Roy. His articles and short stories were regularly published in the Sabujpatra, Prabasi and Atmashakti. They were highly appreciated in the reading community. The stories published in Sabujpatra were later published in book form as Saptaparno.

== Bibliography ==
- Bose, Mihir (2004). Raj, Secrets, Revolution: A Life of Subhas Chandra Bose. Grice Chapman Publishing. ISBN 9780954572648. OCLC 959922484.
