= Devi (disambiguation) =

Devi is the Sanskrit word for goddess.

Devi may also refer to:

== Film and television ==
- Devi (1960 film), an Indian Bengali film by Satyajit Ray
- Devi (1970 film), an Indian Hindi film by V. Madhusudhana Rao
- Devi (1972 film), an Indian Malayalam film by K. S. Sethumadhavan
- Devi (1999 film), an Indian Telugu film by Kodi Ramakrishna,
- Devi (2016 film), an Indian trilingual comedy horror film
  - Devi 2, its 2019 sequel
- Debi (2018 film), a Bangladeshi film
- Devi (2020 film), an Indian Hindi-language short film
- Devi (TV series), an Indian TV series, 2002–2004
- Maharakshak: Devi, an Indian superhero children's TV series, 2015
- "Devi", an episode of Xena: Warrior Princess season 4, 1999

== People ==
- Devi (name), including a list of people and fictional characters with the given name and surname

== Places ==
- Devi, Khyber Pakhtunkhwa, a village in Khyber Pakhtunkhwa, Pakistan
- Devi, Punjab, a town in Punjab, Pakistan

== See also ==
- Dewi (disambiguation)
- Deva (disambiguation)
- Davy (disambiguation)
- Davi (disambiguation)
- Debi (disambiguation)
- Devi Mahatmya, an ancient Hindu text about the goddess
- Devi inflection, in Sanskrit grammar
- Mahadevi, a form of the Hindu goddess
