= William Davy =

William Davy may refer to:

- William Gabriel Davy (1780–1856), British Army general who fought in the Peninsular War
- William Davy (lawyer) (died 1780), English barrister
- William Davy (divine) (1743–1826), English priest and writer

== See also ==
- William Davie (disambiguation)
- Davy (disambiguation)
