= Scott Davis =

Scott Davis may refer to:

== Sports ==
- Scott Davis (tennis) (born 1962), American tennis player
- Scott Davis (figure skater) (born 1972), American figure skater
- Scott Davis (cyclist) (born 1979), Australian cyclist
- Scott Davis (defensive lineman) (born 1965), former NFL player
- Scott Davis (offensive lineman) (born 1970), former NFL player
- Scott Davis (pole vaulter), American athlete and medalist in athletics at the 1987 Pan American Games

== Other people ==
- Scott Davis (businessman) (born 1952), American businessperson, chairman and chief executive officer of United Parcel Service
- Scott D. Davis (born 1973), American contemporary pianist
- Scott Davis (announcer) (1943–2010), American track and field announcer
- Scott Davis (Scotty D) (born 1975), American songwriter, musician, and producer
- Scott B. Davis (born 1971), American photographer

== See also ==
- Scott Davies (disambiguation)
