= Davie =

Davie is a surname, and a form of the masculine given name David.

Notable people with these names include:

== Surname ==
- Alan Davie (1920–2014), Scottish painter and musician
- Alexander Edmund Batson Davie (1847–1889), Canadian politician and eighth Premier of British Columbia
- Art Davie, American businessman
- Bert Davie (1899–1979), Australian cricketer and Australian rules footballer
- Bob Davie (American football) (born 1954), American college football head coach, former player and sports commentator
- Bob Davie (ice hockey) (1912–1990), Canadian ice hockey player
- Daniel DeWitt Tompkins Davie (1816–1877), American photographer
- Donald Davie (1922–1995), English poet and literary critic
- Earl Davie (born 1927), American biochemist
- Elspeth Davie (1918–1995), Scottish novelist, short story writer, painter and art teacher, wife of George Elder Davie
- Erin Davie, American actress and singer
- Eugenie Mary Ladenburg Davie (1895–1975), American political activist
- George Elder Davie (1912–2007), Scottish philosopher and author of The Democratic Intellect
- George M. Davie (1848–1900), American lawyer and poet
- Grace Davie, British sociologist
- Harry Davie (1905–1968), Australian rules footballer
- Henry Ferguson Davie (1797–1885), British Army general and Member of Parliament
- Hutch Davie (1930–2020), American orchestra leader, pianist and composer of popular music
- John Davie (disambiguation), several people
- Michael Davie (1924–2005), British journalist and newspaper editor
- Preston Davie (1881–1967), American lawyer and colonel
- Sandy Davie (born 1945), Scottish football goalkeeper
- Scott Davie (disambiguation), several people
- Theodore Davie (1852–1898), Canadian lawyer, politician and jurist, tenth Premier of British Columbia and Chief Justice of the Supreme Court of British Columbia
- Tim Davie (born 1967), chief executive officer of BBC Worldwide
- William Richardson Davie (1756–1820), one of the founding fathers of the United States, Revolutionary War officer and tenth Governor of North Carolina
- Willie Davie (1925–1996), Scottish footballer
- various Davie baronets

== Given name ==
- Davie504 (born 1994), Italian YouTuber and bass guitarist
- Davie Allan, American rock guitarist
- David Bowie (1947–2016), English singer-songwriter credited as "Davie Jones" on his debut single
- David Davie Cattanach (born 1946), Scottish footballer
- David Davie Cooper (1956–1995), Scottish footballer
- David Davie Dodds (born 1958), Scottish footballer
- David Davie Duncan (1921–1991), Scottish footballer
- Edmund Davie Fulton (1916–2000), Canadian politician and judge
- Davie Irons, Scottish footballer and coach
- Davie Kemp (born 1950), Scottish footballer
- David Davie Mathie (1919–1954), Scottish footballer
- David Davie Robb (born 1947), Scottish footballer
- David Davie Russell (1868–1952), Scottish footballer
- Davie Selke (born 1995), German footballer
- Davie Sneddon (born 1936), Scottish football player and manager
- David Davie Wilson (born 1939), Scottish footballer

== See also ==
- Davie County, North Carolina
- Davie, Florida
- Davie Shipbuilding
- Davie Village and Davie Street, a neighbourhood and street in Vancouver, British Columbia, Canada
- Davey (disambiguation)
