= Devi (name) =

Devi is a given name and surname. People with the name include:

== People with the given name ==
- Devi (wife of Ashoka), the first wife of the third Mauryan emperor, Ashoka
- Devi Kinal Putri (born 1996), Indonesian actress and former member idol group of JKT48
- Devi S., Indian film actress and dubbing artist in Malayalam movies
- Kamala Devi Harris (born 1964), American politician, Vice President of the United States
- Devi McCallion (born 1991), Canadian experimental and pop musician, former member of Black Dresses

== People with the surname ==
- Annpurna Devi (born 1970), Indian politician
- Ashapurna Devi (1909–1995), Indian novelist and poet in Bengali
- B. Saroja Devi (1938–2025), Indian actress who has acted in Kannada, Tamil, Telugu and Hindi films
- Bibhu Kumari Devi (born 1944), Indian National Congress politician
- Bindyarani Devi (born 1999), Indian weightlifter
- C. A. Bhavani Devi (born 1993), Indian sabre fencer
- Durgawati Devi (1907–1999), Indian revolutionary and freedom fighter
- Gayatri Devi (1919−2009), Indian women politician
- Girija Devi (1929-2017), Indian classical singer
- Gulabo Devi (born 1955), Indian politician
- Indra Devi (1899–2002), Latvian-Indian-American yoga teacher, "the first lady of yoga"
- Kamala Devi (actress) (1933–2010), actress of Indian and British parentage
- Kantavati Devi (died 1799), Nepalese queens consort
- Kosala Devi, Indian queen consort
- Mahasweta Devi (1926–2016), Indian writer in Bengali and an activist
- Mrinalini Devi (1874–1902), Indian translator and the wife of Nobel laureate poet, philosopher, author and musician Rabindranath Tagore
- Lok Priya Devi, Nepalese poet
- Naiki Devi, 12th-century Indian woman
- Nalini Bala Devi, Indian writer and poet in Assamese, First Assamese woman to receive the Sahitya Akademi Award
- Nirmala Devi (1927–1996), Indian actress
- Norodom Buppha Devi (1943–2019), Cambodian dancer
- Phoolan Devi (1963–2001), Indian women politician
- Prathima Devi (Kannada actress) (1933–2021), Indian actress
- Pratima Devi (painter) (1893–1969), Indian Bengali artist
- Prasannamoyee Devi (1856–1939), Bengali poet and travel writer
- Priyamvada Devi (1871–1935), Bengali writer and philanthropist
- Rabri Devi (1956), Indian politician
- Rassundari Devi (1809–1899), Bengali writer
- Rudrama Devi, 13th-century women ruler
- S. Hemalatha Devi (born 1922), Indian independence activist
- Sarada Devi (1853–1920), Hindu religious leader
- Savitri Devi (1905–1982), French-born Greek fascist, Nazi sympathizer, and spy
- Savitri Devi (politician) (born 1948), Indian politician
- Shakuntala Devi (1929–2013), Indian mental calculator and writer
- Shanti Devi (1926–1987), Indian woman who claimed to remember her previous life
- Shanti Devi (Uttar Pradesh politician) (born 1937), Indian politician
- Sheetal Devi (born 2007), Indian para-archer
- Sita Devi (painter) (1914–2005), Indian folk art painter
- Sucharu Devi (1874–1959), Indian women's rights activist
- Suniti Devi (1864–1932), Indian women philanthropist
- Surabhi Vani Devi (born 1952), Indian politician, academic and artist
- T. Kalpana Devi (1941–2016), doctor and politician from Andhra Pradesh
- Uda Devi (died 1857), warrior in the Indian Rebellion of 1857
- Vasundhara Devi (1917–1988), Indian actress, trained Bharathanatyam dancer and carnatic singer

== Fictional characters ==
- Devi d., a character in Johnny the Homicidal Maniac
- Devi, a character in The Name of the Wind by Patrick Rothfuss
- Devi (comics), a character in Virgin Comics
- Devi, Max Cohen's love interest in π
- Devi (monster), a monster of Georgian mythology
- Devi Vishwakumar, the main character in Never Have I Ever
