= Davey =

Davey may refer to:

== People ==
- Davey (given name)
- Davey (surname)
- Edward Davey Dunkle (1872–1941), American Major League Baseball pitcher
- Davey Havok (born 1975), stage name of David Marchand, lead vocalist of the rock band AFI

== Places ==
=== Antarctica ===
- Davey Nunataks, Princess Elizabeth Land
- Davey Peak, Marie Byrd Land
- Davey Point, King George Island, South Shetland Islands

=== Australia ===
- Davey Street, Hobart, Tasmania
- Davey River, Tasmania

=== Other ===
- Davey Lake (Alberta), Canada
- Davey Lake (Saskatchewan), Canada
- Davey, Nebraska, United States, a village

== Entertainment ==
- The title character of the 1960s American stop-motion children's program Davey and Goliath
- "Davey", an episode in the fifth season of Adventure Time

== Other uses ==
- Baron Davey, a life peerage bestowed on Horace Davey, Baron Davey (1833–1907), an English judge and politician
- USS Davey (WYT-81), a harbor patrol entrance patrol and boarding vessel during World War I

== See also ==
- Davey Boy Smith (1962–2002), British professional wrestler
- J*Davey, American music duo
- Davie (disambiguation)
- Davy (disambiguation)
- Daveys Bay, Victoria, Australia
