= William Davie (disambiguation) =

William Richardson Davie was Governor of North Carolina.

William Davie may also refer to:

- Sir William Davie, 4th Baronet (1662–1707)
- Willie Davie (1925–1996), footballer

== See also ==
- William Davy (disambiguation)
- William Davies (disambiguation)
- Davie (disambiguation)
