= Kaur =

Surname of Sikh women

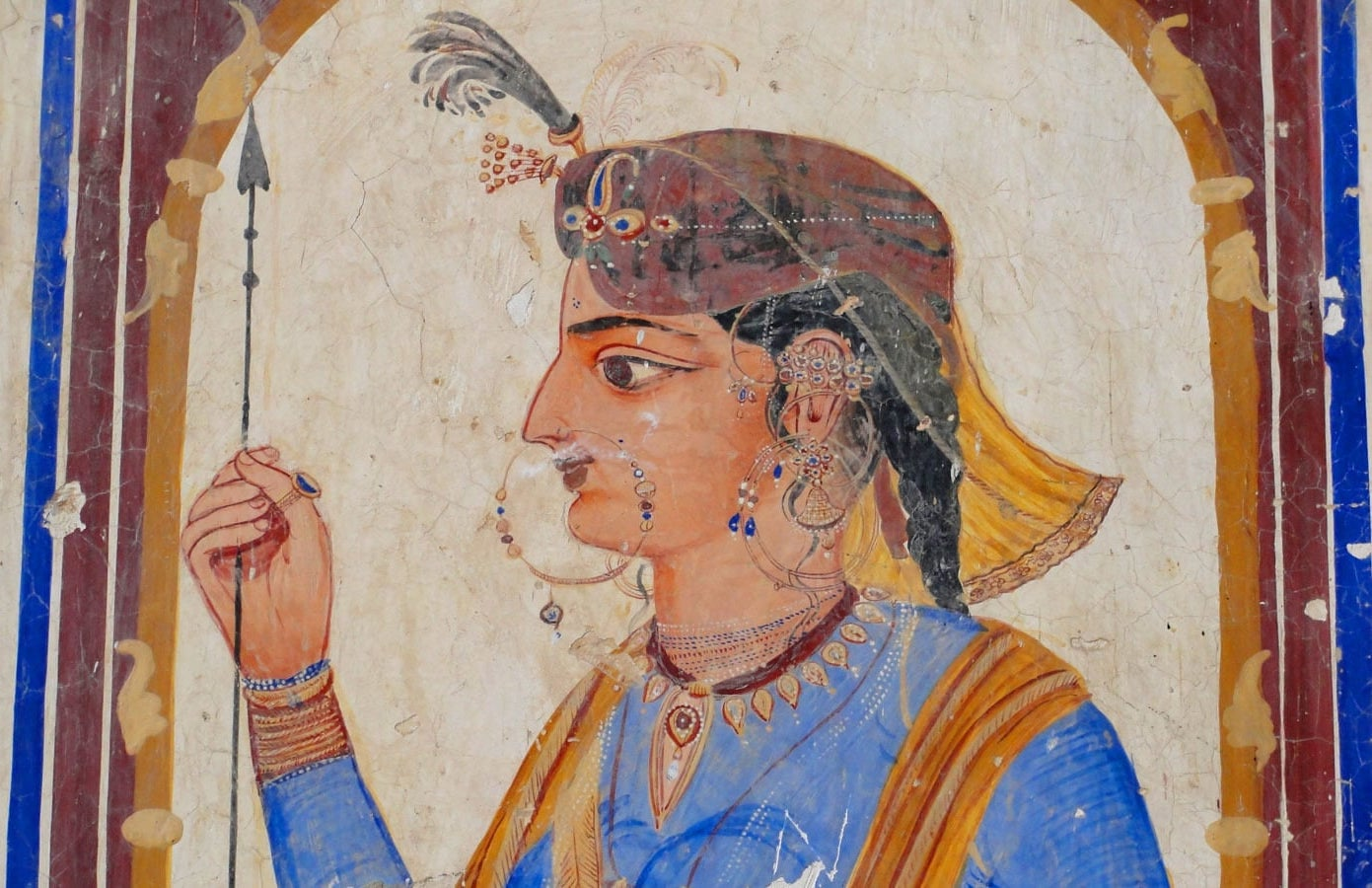
19th century depiction of a Sikh woman (a Kaur) from a Haveli

Kaur (Punjabi: ਕੌਰ Punjabi pronunciation: [kɔːɾᵊ] [Gurmukhi] / کور [Shahmukhi]; lit. 'crown prince[ss]' or 'spiritual prince[ss]'), sometimes spelled as Kour, is a surname or a part of a personal name primarily used by the Sikh and some Hindu women of the Punjab region. It is also sometimes translated as 'lioness', not because this meaning is etymologically derived from the name, but as a parallel to the Sikh male name Singh, which means 'lion'.

== Etymology ==
The Dictionary of American Family Names states that the name is etymologically derived from the Sanskrit word Kumari meaning a girl or daughter of a king which was later abridged to Kuar and became Kaur by metathesis. Other scholars, however, assert that Kaur is a diminutive of and the Punjabi equivalent of Kanwar/Kunwar – a Rajput title meaning prince or bachelor that was used for people of status, and eventually became a common Rajput female designation. W.H. McLeod has also written that most regard the name as the female form of Kumar which is Kumari.

== History ==
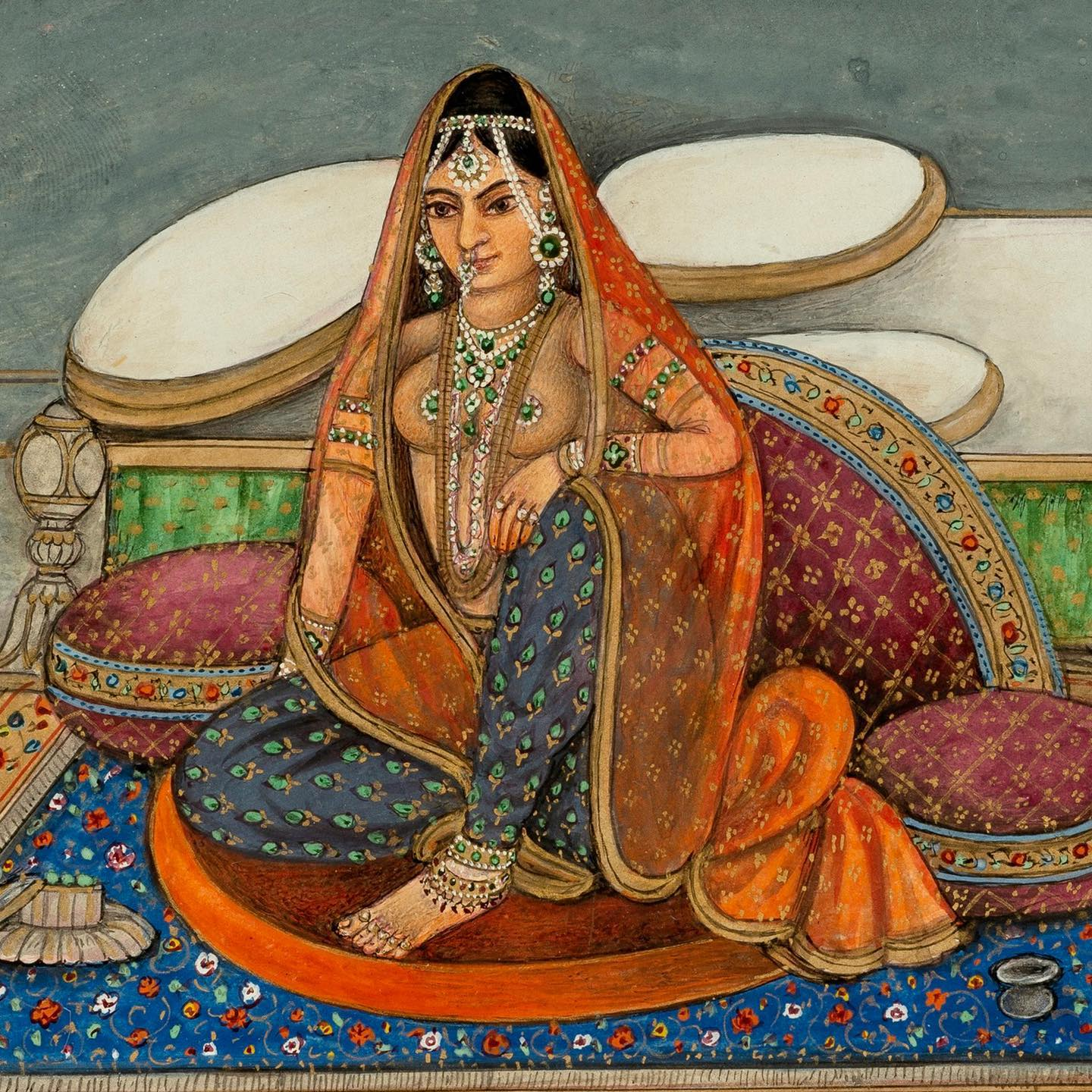
Detail of a folio from Colonel James Skinner's ‘Tazkirat al-Umara’ (‘Biographies of the Nobles’) showing the unnamed widowed Sikh queen of Rup Singh of Radaur, circa 1836.

The traditional narrative is as follows: The tenth guru of Sikhs, Guru Gobind Singh, introduced Kaur and Singh when he administered Amrit to both male and female Sikhs; all female Sikhs were asked to use the name Kaur after their forename, and male Sikhs were to use the name Singh. The adoption of Kaur and Singh as religious surnames was also intended to reduce caste-based prejudice. Because familial last names often signal a person's caste status (or for women who adopted their spouse's surname, the caste of their spouse), substituting Kaur and Singh allowed Sikhs to implement the Sikh religion's rejection of the caste system. This narrative has been contested by some scholars who wrote of the name's anachronistic religious association.

According to early sources, "Kaur" was used by both males and females in Punjab. The appellation appears in the Guru Granth Sahib retaining its traditional delineated meaning of "prince", whereas in the Dasam Granth it is used to refer to a woman's name. "Kaur" was appended by some Sikh women prior to the initiation of the Khalsa, including the daughter of Guru Har Rai. According to older British accounts, "Kaur" ceased to become a male signifier in the late nineteenth century and henceforth became encumbered to an exclusive female title. Until the twentieth century, the name's usage was a result of cultural diffusion, as opposed to religious association.

Despite the widespread belief that "Kaur" was conferred to women on the inauguration day of the Khalsa, there is a dearth of textual evidence corroborating this, further exacerbated by the paucity of conclusive information about the inauguration in general and discrepancies in the sources regarding female naming patterns, state J. S. Grewal and Doris Jakobsh. The appellation "Kaur" for women did not appear in early Sikh sources following the initiation of the Khalsa, in addition, the appellation was traditionally omitted in the name of the symbolic matriarch of the Khalsa, Mata Sahib Devan. Although the early historical texts thoroughly stressed the importance of appending the name "Singh" for male Sikhs, the only text stipulating female naming conventions, the Prem Sumarg, stated that women were to be conferred the title "Devi".

According to Harleen Singh, prior to the Singh Sabha movement of the late 19th century, Sikh women used a variety of titles, namely Devi, Bai, and Kaur. Kaur title being used by Sikh women was not invented by the reformers and some Sikh women prior to the movement used Kaur in their name, even some non-Sikh women, from Hindu Brahmin and Khatri-backgrounds, used Kaur in their name. The key change was that the usage of Kaur was mandated and standardized for Sikh women by the Singh Sabha reformers, whilst other traditional Sikh female titles, such as Devi and Bai, fell into disuse and were abandoned.

The Tat Khalsa, a reformist Sikh movement seeking to consolidate the hitherto multifariousness within the Sikh community and establish a separate, distinct identity from Hindus and Muslims, had begun to emerge in the late nineteenth century. Literature published by Vir Singh and Kahn Singh Nabha within the framework of this emerging polity, wrote of a Hindu woman's conversion which had been accompanied by the adoption of the surname "Kaur", the latter featured the transmutation of Mata Sahib Devan's name to Mata Sahib Kaur. These works precipitated the Tat Khalsa's increased cognizance for the need of a consolidated Sikh female identifier. The Tat Khalsa ignored the injunction within the Prem Sumarg and supplanted it with "Kaur", due to its association with female Sikh aristocracy in the eighteenth century and its Rajput origins. According to Jaspal Kaur Singh, the baptism of women and the bestowal of "Kaur" was incipient only during the colonial period, during which the Tat Khalsa sought to combat perceived threats to Sikhism, both from Christian and Arya Samaj proselytization, by removing "Hinduized" and "un-Sikh" cultural and religious practices from within their fold and accentuating and introducing egalitarian practices to the fore of their religion. By the mid twentieth century, under the auspices of the Shiromani Gurdwara Parbandhak Committee, "Kaur" had been cemented and ratified as the Sikh female epithet, attaining similar significance as its male counterpart "Singh". Female Sikh nomenclature prior to the Tat Khalsa's efforts was ambiguous, heterogeneous, undelineated and lacked authoritative basis; single names instead of dual names were prevalent among women, ancillary epithets included "Singhni" or "Sikhni", many Sikh women were also named "Kumari" or "Devi".

== See also ==
- Women in Sikhism – Principles of Sikhi and women
- Singh – Surname originating from Asia
- Kunwar
