= Barada Charan Gupta =

- Occupations: Writer, geologist
- Known for: Work in geology, Contributions to Sabujpatra
- Notable work: Shashwata Tarun

Barada Charan Gupta was part of the short-lived but influential Sabujpatra group of writers in colonial Bengal that published its journal from 1922 to 1927. His parents were residents of Gayeshpur (which now in East Bengal, Bangladesh). Barada was a geologist, and was the second son and third child of Durga Charan Gupta, a businessman and founder of Gupta Press and Kailasbasini Devi, a wellkonwn female writer. He had one elder brother named Jagatjyoti Gupta and two sisters.

== Work ==
After completing his education from the National Council of Education West Bengal (the first nationalistic technical institute), he joined the Geological Survey of India working with Mr. Heron, the geologist in the capacity of field supervisor. At GSI he was involved in field surveys for mineral resource of India and traveled extensively across the country, staying in different states like Bihar, Rajputana, Orissa in places like Mewar, Jaisagar and Telinagar etc. His surveys included the examination of the wolfram deposit in Orissa and the granite sheet jointing and quartzite ridge survey in the Aravalli Range, which are still used. The evidence of his detailed study on the field of rocks and minerals can be found in the different memoirs published at that time by the GSI and other field notes now in possession of his family.

== Nationalist Politics ==
As a Gandhian, Barada Gupta learned to use the charkha spinning wheel to make bundles of thread, which his wife Nanibala Gupta also practiced. According to his sons and daughters, when the family went shopping for Puja clothes, he insisted on khādī and he would sweep aside the imported colourful, soft, shimmering, fabrics.

He was awarded the Rai Saheb Title from the British Government for visionary leadership and exemplary service to the nation. But Gupta declined the title and discouraged people from even mentioning him.

Gupta was part of a movement that aimed to disprove the label of effeminacy that the British had imposed upon the Bengalis. Centres of physical training, wrestling and yoga had come up all over Bengal, with the militant Swadeshi movement often operating out of these. Gupta was part of a group that claimed that the regeneration of masculinity was critical to the spirit of anti-colonial nationalism. He also promoted youth sports. Along with his hectic work schedule which involved an average of 6 months of touring per year, he initiated and organized an annual football event, the Tarini Charan Memorial Shield, where players from adjoining states would travel to Rangpur. Tarini Charan, whose name the shield bore, had sponsored his school education when Gupta lost his father at a young age.

== Literary interests ==
Gupta was a member of the Sabujpatra group. He wrote in the Cholitobhasha, or Standard Colloquial Bengali dialect that was showcased and promoted by Sabujpatra and which is today the standard Bengali writing style. Gupta authored the essay 'Samajik Sahitya' which appeared in Volume V, Issue 12 of Sabujpatra (1918). His contributions to the different volumes of Sabujpatra and some new prose was collected and published as Shashwata Tarun, to which Pramatha Chowdhury wrote the Introduction and Rabindranath Tagore the foreword. Gupta authored a second book which is preserved in its manuscript form.

Barada Charan Gupta died on 20 December 1955, at the early age of 62 due to a sudden cardiac failure while taking his regular early morning walk.
