= M. Surendran =

Indian politician

Member of the Tamil Nadu Legislative Assembly
- In office 1967 - 1972; 1971 - 1976; 1971 - 1976
- Preceded by: Karuppanna Gounder
- Constituency: Mettur

Personal details
- Political party: Praja Socialist Party

M. Surendran was an Indian politician and former Member of the Legislative Assembly of Tamil Nadu. He was elected to the Tamil Nadu legislative assembly from Mettur constituency as a Praja Socialist Party candidate in 1967, and 1971 elections.

== Electoral performance ==
1971 Tamil Nadu Legislative Assembly election: Mettur
Party	Candidate	Votes	%	±%
PSP	M. Surendran	32,656	57.45%	New
INC	Karuppanna Gounder	21,538	37.89%	−1.28
Independent	Sengoda Gounder	2,650	4.66%	New
Margin of victory		11,118	19.56%	9.94%
Turnout		56,844	62.86%	−12.07%
Registered electors		97,813		
PSP hold		Swing	8.67%	

1967 Madras Legislative Assembly election: Mettur
Party	Candidate	Votes	%	±%
PSP	M. Surendran	30,635	48.78%	New
INC	K. K. Gounder	24,597	39.17%	+5.12
Independent	R. S. Kandasami	5,950	9.47%	New
Independent	M. Arulsami	1,619	2.58%	New
Margin of victory		6,038	9.61%	8.78%
Turnout		62,801	74.93%	6.00%
Registered electors		89,534		
PSP gain from INC		Swing	14.74%	
