= K. S. Ardhanareeswara Gounder =

Indian politician

Member of the Madras State Assembly
- In office 1952–1957
- Preceded by: S. Marimuthu Gounder
- Constituency: Edappadi
- In office 1957 - 1962; 1962 - 1967
- Constituency: Mettur

Personal details
- Party: Indian National Congress

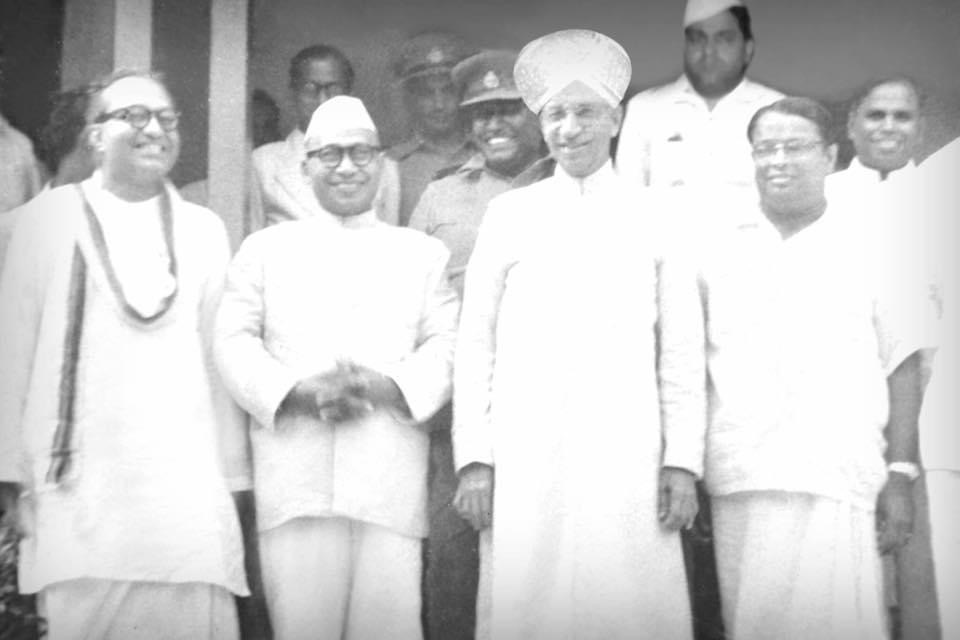

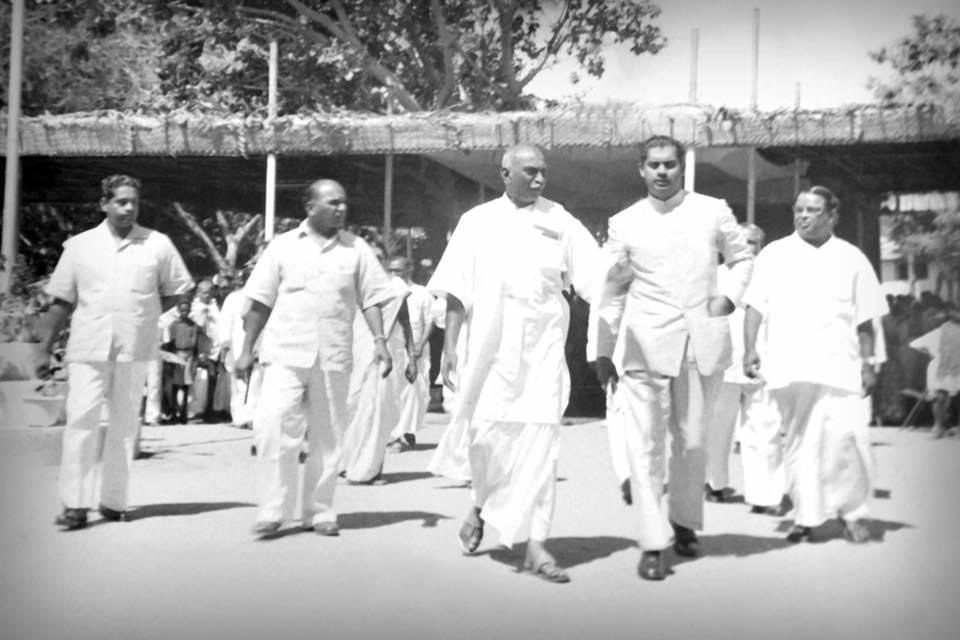

K. S. Ardhanareeswara Gounder was an Indian politician and former Member of the Legislative Assembly of Tamil Nadu. He was elected to the Tamil Nadu legislative assembly as an Indian National Congress candidate from Edapadi constituency in 1952 election, from Mettur constituency in 1957, and 1962 elections.

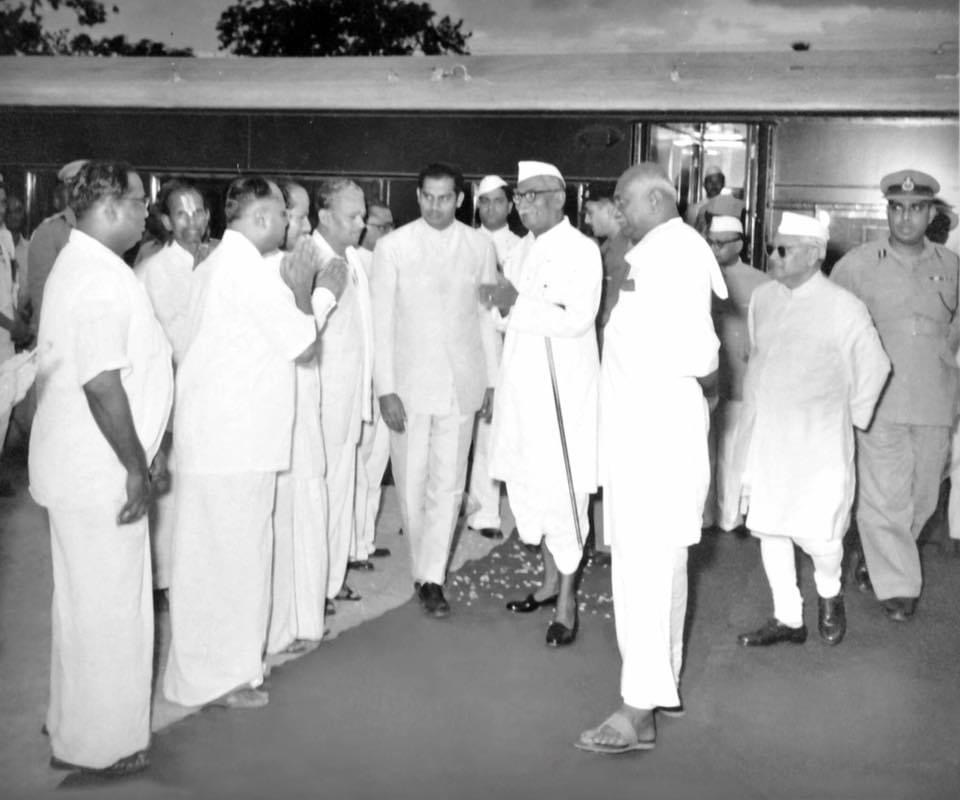
