= K. P. Nachimuthu Gounder =

Indian politician

K. P. Nachimuthu Gounder was an Indian politician and former Member of the Legislative Assembly of Tamil Nadu. He was elected to the Tamil Nadu legislative assembly from Mettur constituency as an Anna Dravida Munnetra Kazhagam candidate in 1977, 1980 and 1984 elections.
