= Davy (surname) =

Davy is the surname of:

- David Elisha Davy (1769–1851), English antiquary
- Edmund Davy (1785–1857), British chemist and academic
- Alexandre Davy de la Pailleterie, also known as Alexandre Dumas (1802–1870), French novelist and playwright
- Edward Davy (1806–1885), British physician and researcher
- Georges Davy (1883–1976), French sociologist
- Humphry Davy (1778–1829), British chemist
- Jean-François Davy (1945–2025), French film producer, director, screenwriter and actor
- John Davy (disambiguation)
- Richard Davy (c. 1465–1507), Renaissance composer, organist and choirmaster
- Steve Davy, British bass guitarist
- Thomas Davy (cyclist) (born 1968), French former cyclist
- Thomas Davy (politician) (1890–1933), Attorney-General and Minister for Education for Western Australia
- William Davy (divine) (1743–1826), English priest and writer
- William Davy (lawyer) (died 1780), English barrister
- William Gabriel Davy (1780–1856), British Army general who fought in the Peninsular War
- Davy (Surrey cricketer) (first name unknown), English cricketer who played in 1787–1788
