= N. Nanjappan =

Indian politician

N. Nanjappan is an Indian politician and was elected to the Tamil Nadu Legislative Assembly from the Pennagaram constituency in 2011. He was . He represents the Communist Party of India party.
