= Parimala and Co =

2026 Indian Tamil film by Pandiraaj

- Theatrical release poster
- Directed by: Pandiraaj
- Written by: Pandiraaj
- Produced by: Allirajah Subaskaran; G. K. M. Tamil Kumaran; Pandiraaj
- Starring: Jayaram; Urvashi; Mysskin; Yogi Babu; Sandy; Santosh Sobhan; Sanjana Krishnamoorthy; Ananthika Sanilkumar
- Cinematography: George C. Williams
- Edited by: Pradeep E. Ragav
- Music by: FoxN
- Production companies: Lyca Productions; Tamil Kumaran Productions; Pasanga Productions
- Distributed by: Five Star Creations
- Release date: 5 June 2026
- Running time: 138 minutes
- Country: India
- Language: Tamil

Parimala and Co is a 2026 Indian Tamil-language black comedy thriller film written and directed by Pandiraaj. The film stars an ensemble cast featuring Jayaram, Urvashi, Mysskin, Yogi Babu, Sandy, Santosh Sobhan, Sanjana Krishnamoorthy and Ananthika Sanilkumar. It follows the struggles of a dysfunctional family who become the prime suspects to a murder connected to their household.

The film, produced by Allirajah Subaskaran's Lyca Productions, G. K. M. Tamil Kumaran's Tamil Kumaran Entertainment and Pandiraaj's Pasanga Productions, has cinematography by George C. Williams and editing by Pradeep E. Ragav. It was released on 5 June 2026 and received mixed reviews from critics.

== Plot ==
Parimala, his wife Sudhanthiram and daughters Madhumitha and Parasakthi, are a dysfunctional family. Varghese, a local rowdy pesters the girls and tells Parimala outright that he means to marry one of them. The family half-jokes about getting rid of him, then lets it go. Soon enough, he turns up dead anyway. Emperuman, a police inspector, investigates Varghese's murder, circling the family while they play innocent.

== Cast ==
- Jayaram as Parimala R
- Urvashi as Sudhanthiram
- Mysskin as Inspector M. Emperuman
- Yogi Babu as Uyir Ulag
- Sandy as R. Varghese
- Santosh Sobhan as Chittarasan "Chittu"
- Sanjana Krishnamoorthy as Parasakthi
- Ananthika Sanilkumar as Madhumitha
- Singampuli as Kamatchi
- Bagavathi Perumal as Raghavan
- G. K. M. Tamil Kumaran as Sub Inspector T. N. Koviyan
- G. R. Adithya as Aravind "Arnold" Swamy
- Sendrayan as Varghese's friend
- Poornima Ravi as Gomathi
- Gayathri Krishnan as Sengamalam
- Harshad as Jomi George Nicholas Cage
- Sanjeev Goswami
- Kalaiyarasan Kannusamy as Shock Absorber
- P. L. Thenappan as Velumani

== Production ==
Pandiraaj revealed that during the COVID-19 lockdown in India he watched a streaming series and felt he could write a similar screenplay. His then assistant director Ashwin challenged him to write it within a week, which became the basis of Parimala and Co. Pandiraaj initially had Rajinikanth or Kamal Haasan in mind for the lead role that was eventually played by Jayaram and said Urvashi was the only choice for the lead actress. Jayaram and Urvashi, who frequently co-starred in the 1990s, reunited for the first time in a full-length manner since Panchatanthiram (2002), although they also appeared together in a segment in the anthology film Putham Pudhu Kaalai (2020). During the first day of filming in Palakkad, Urvashi learned of her brother's death but refused to delay production despite her grief. Filming was completed in 45 working days.

== Soundtrack ==
Parimala and Co

Soundtrack album by FoxN
- Genre: Feature film soundtrack
- Language: Tamil
- Label: Think Music
- Producer: FoxN

FoxN chronology
Parimala and Co (2026)	Love Oh Love (2026)

Singles from Parimala and Co
- 1. "Watcha Udadha" Released: 14 May 2026; 2. "Tomato Thakkali" Released: 23 May 2026

The soundtrack was composed by FoxN. The first single "Watcha Udadha" was released on 14 May 2026. The second single "Tomato Thakkali" was released on 23 May.

Track listing
No.	Title	Lyrics	Singer(s)	Length
1.	"Sattu Buttu"	Jothi Kanna, Pradeep PJ	Sublahshini, Pradeep PJ	3:04
2.	"Tomato Thakkali"	Varma	Anthony Daasan, Pradeep PJ, Varma	2:02
3.	"Watcha Udadha"	LRC, Pradeep PJ	Pradeep PJ	2:48
4.	"Vazhi Thirivu"	Veno Miss	Veno Miss	2:26
5.	"Doki Doki"	Pradeep PJ, Jothi Kanna	Adithya RK	2:45
Total length:				13:05

== Release ==
Parimala and Co was released in theatres on 5 June 2026. It was distributed by Five Star Creations in Tamil Nadu. The film began streaming on ZEE5 from 10 July 2026.

=== Reception ===
Avinash Ramachandran of Cinema Express rated the film 1.5/5 and wrote, "Despite a terrific cast and an intriguing premise, this sluggish family mystery struggles to keep up the suspense and spirits". Bhuvanesh Chandar of The Hindu also gave a negative review, criticising the screenwriting and said the film tests one's patience. Abhinav Subramanian of The Times of India wrote, "George C. Williams' camerawork is clean and unfussy, but the cutting works against it, chopping straightforward scenes into needless jumps and forever nudging you to look here and then there for no real reason. The story, too, keeps circling back to the same house and the same question until it begins to feel thin".

Janani K of India Today gave the film 1.5/5, comparing it unfavourably to Drishyam (2013) and wrote, "Despite having the best of talents as part of the cast, the film is non-inventive and drowns in weak writing". Anandu Suresh of The Indian Express rated the film 1/5 and wrote, "Pandiraaj could have at least spoofed director Jeethu Joseph's Papanasam/Drishyam, and it might still have worked out better for him."

=== Box office ===
Parimala and Co collected ₹6.70 crore (US$720,000) worldwide within the first three days of release.
