= Scott Davies =

Scott Davies may refer to:

- Scott Davies (footballer, born 1987), retired English footballer
- Scott Davies (footballer, born 1988), Irish footballer playing for Slough Town
- Scott Davies (cyclist) (born 1995), Welsh racing cyclist
- Scott Davies (cricketer) in 2009 Indoor Cricket World Cup

== See also ==
- Scott Davie (disambiguation)
- Scott Davis (disambiguation)
