= Mettur Assembly constituency =

State Legislative Assembly Constituency in Tamil Nadu

Coordinates: 11.80°N 77.80°E

Mottur
- Constituency No. 85 for the Tamil Nadu Legislative Assembly

Constituency details
- Country: India
- Region: South India
- State: Tamil Nadu
- District: Salem
- Lok Sabha constituency: Dharmapuri
- Established: 1957
- Total electors: 2,55,869

Member of Legislative Assembly
- 17th Tamil Nadu Legislative Assembly
- Incumbent G. Venkatachalam
- Party: AIADMK
- Alliance: NDA
- Elected year: 2026

Mettur is a state legislative assembly constituency in Salem district in the Indian state of Tamil Nadu. Its State Assembly Constituency number is 85. It comprises a portion of Mettur taluk and is a part of the wider Dharmapuri Lok Sabha constituency for national elections to the Parliament of India. It is one of the 234 State Legislative Assembly Constituencies in Tamil Nadu, in India. Elections and winners in the constituency are listed below.

== Members of Legislative Assembly ==
=== Madras State ===
Year	Winner	Party
1957	K. S. Ardhanareeswara Gounder	Indian National Congress
1962	K. S. Arthanareswara Gounder	Indian National Congress
1967	M. Surendran	Praja Socialist Party

=== Tamil Nadu ===
Year	Winner	Party
1971	M. Surendran	Praja Socialist Party
1977	K. P. N. Gounder	All India Anna Dravida Munnetra Kazhagam
1980	K. P. N. Gounder	All India Anna Dravida Munnetra Kazhagam
1984	K. P. N. Gounder	All India Anna Dravida Munnetra Kazhagam
1989	M. Sreerangan	Communist Party of India (Marxist)
1991	S. Sundarambal	All India Anna Dravida Munnetra Kazhagam
1996	P. Gopal	Dravida Munnetra Kazhagam
2001	S. Sundarambal	All India Anna Dravida Munnetra Kazhagam
2006	G. K. Mani	Pattali Makkal Katchi
2011	S. R. Parthiban	Desiya Murpokku Dravida Kazhagam
2016	S. Semmalai	All India Anna Dravida Munnetra Kazhagam
2021	S. Sadhasivam	Pattali Makkal Katchi
2026	G. Venkatachalam	All India Anna Dravida Munnetra Kazhagam

== Election results ==
Vote share of winning candidates
2026	37.43%
2021	44.43%
2016	35.05%
2011	44.62%
2006	47.94%
2001	42.25%
1996	43.97%
1991	49.30%
1989	25.61%
1984	48.15%
1980	58.28%
1977	43.67%
1971	57.45%
1967	48.78%
1962	34.04%
1957	45.65%

=== 2026 ===
2026 Tamil Nadu Legislative Assembly election: Mettur
Party	Candidate	Votes	%	±%
AIADMK	Venkatachalam. G	86,498	37.43	New
DMK	Midhun Chakravarthy. M	67,393	29.16	▼14.97
TVK	Selvam. K	65,260	28.24	New
NTK	Vidhya Veerappan	7,109	3.08	▼1.09
NOTA	NOTA	794	0.34	▼0.69
Margin of victory		19,105	8.27	▲7.97
Turnout		2,31,105	90.32	▲14.11
Registered electors		2,55,869		▼30,751
AIADMK gain from PMK		Swing	▲37.43	

=== 2021 ===
2021 Tamil Nadu Legislative Assembly election: Mettur
Party	Candidate	Votes	%	±%
PMK	S. Sadhasivam	97,055	44.43%	+20.37
DMK	S. Srinivasaperumal	96,399	44.13%	+12.11
NTK	C. Manikandan	9,109	4.17%	+3.7
MNM	P. Anusuya	4,605	2.11%	New
Independent	Selvan	2,823	1.29%	New
NOTA	NOTA	2,247	1.03%	+0.15
DMDK	M. Ramesh Aravind	1,874	0.86%	−1.98
DAMK	K. Thangavel	1,783	0.82%	New
Margin of victory		656	0.30%	−2.73%
Turnout		218,442	76.21%	−2.66%
Rejected ballots		427	0.20%	
Registered electors		286,620		
PMK gain from AIADMK		Swing	9.38%	

=== 2016 ===
2016 Tamil Nadu Legislative Assembly election: Mettur
Party	Candidate	Votes	%	±%
AIADMK	S. Semmalai	72,751	35.05%	New
DMK	S. R. Parthiban	66,469	32.02%	New
PMK	G. K. Mani	49,939	24.06%	−19.03
DMDK	R. Boopathy	5,892	2.84%	−41.78
NOTA	NOTA	1,829	0.88%	New
BJP	P. Balasubramanian	1,428	0.69%	−0.66
KMDK	A. Rajagounder	1,345	0.65%	New
Independent	R. Parthiban	707	0.34%	New
Margin of victory		6,282	3.03%	1.50%
Turnout		207,574	78.87%	−0.76%
Registered electors		263,189		
AIADMK gain from DMDK		Swing	-9.57%	

=== 2011 ===
2011 Tamil Nadu Legislative Assembly election: Mettur
Party	Candidate	Votes	%	±%
DMDK	S. R. Parthiban	75,672	44.62%	+36.71
PMK	G. K. Mani	73,078	43.09%	−4.86
Independent	Dr. K. Padmarajan	6,273	3.70%	New
Independent	A. Pakkiam	2,738	1.61%	New
IJK	R. Senthilkumar	2,487	1.47%	New
BJP	P. Balasubramanian	2,286	1.35%	+0.66
Independent	S. K. Parthiban	1,338	0.79%	New
Independent	R. Mani	1,254	0.74%	New
Independent	V. Ranjith	1,254	0.74%	New
Independent	P. Murugan	1,110	0.65%	New
Margin of victory		2,594	1.53%	−6.53%
Turnout		212,992	79.63%	9.98%
Registered electors		169,607		
DMDK gain from PMK		Swing	-3.33%	

=== 2006 ===
2006 Tamil Nadu Legislative Assembly election: Mettur
Party	Candidate	Votes	%	±%
PMK	G. K. Mani	66,250	47.94%	New
AIADMK	K. Kandasamy	55,112	39.88%	−2.37
DMDK	S. Dhandapany	10,921	7.90%	New
Independent	M. S. Mani	1,831	1.33%	New
Independent	K. Padmarajan	1,454	1.05%	New
BJP	M. Muthu Kumaran	957	0.69%	New
Independent	T. Saravanan	822	0.59%	New
Margin of victory		11,138	8.06%	1.12%
Turnout		138,183	69.65%	13.88%
Registered electors		198,408		
PMK gain from AIADMK		Swing	5.69%	

=== 2001 ===
2001 Tamil Nadu Legislative Assembly election: Mettur
Party	Candidate	Votes	%	±%
AIADMK	S. Sundarambal	49,504	42.25%	+16.27
DMK	P. Gopal	41,369	35.31%	−8.66
Independent	K. P. Nachimuthu Gounder	20,906	17.84%	New
MDMK	A. Arumugam	1,610	1.37%	New
Independent	K. Munusamy	1,304	1.11%	New
Independent	S. Raja	1,040	0.89%	New
Independent	K. Padmarajan	809	0.69%	New
Independent	K. Manickam	627	0.54%	New
Margin of victory		8,135	6.94%	−10.37%
Turnout		117,169	55.76%	−9.90%
Registered electors		210,151		
AIADMK gain from DMK		Swing	-1.72%	

=== 1996 ===
1996 Tamil Nadu Legislative Assembly election: Mettur
Party	Candidate	Votes	%	±%
DMK	P. Gopal	50,799	43.97%	New
PMK	R. Balakrishnan	30,793	26.65%	New
AIADMK	P. Soundram	30,012	25.98%	−23.33
CPI(M)	M. Rajagopal	2,336	2.02%	−14.49
Margin of victory		20,006	17.32%	−7.21%
Turnout		115,540	65.66%	2.65%
Registered electors		185,204		
DMK gain from AIADMK		Swing	-5.34%	

=== 1991 ===
1991 Tamil Nadu Legislative Assembly election: Mettur
Party	Candidate	Votes	%	±%
AIADMK	S. Sundarambal	53,368	49.30%	+24.93
PMK	G. K. Mani	26,825	24.78%	New
CPI(M)	M. Seerangan	17,878	16.52%	−9.1
Independent	K. P. Nachimuthu	8,822	8.15%	New
Margin of victory		26,543	24.52%	23.28%
Turnout		108,245	63.01%	4.97%
Registered electors		178,129		
AIADMK gain from CPI(M)		Swing	23.69%	

=== 1989 ===
1989 Tamil Nadu Legislative Assembly election: Mettur
Party	Candidate	Votes	%	±%
CPI(M)	M. Sreerangan	23,308	25.61%	+7.2
AIADMK	K. Gurusamy	22,180	24.37%	−23.78
INC	R. Narayanan	20,721	22.77%	New
Independent	K. P. Nachimuthu	15,094	16.59%	New
CPI	K. Navamani	7,409	8.14%	New
Independent	K. K. Sidhan	541	0.59%	New
Margin of victory		1,128	1.24%	−17.39%
Turnout		90,996	58.04%	−15.24%
Registered electors		160,935		
CPI(M) gain from AIADMK		Swing	-22.54%	

=== 1984 ===
1984 Tamil Nadu Legislative Assembly election: Mettur
Party	Candidate	Votes	%	±%
AIADMK	K. P. Nachimuthu Gounder	46,083	48.15%	−10.13
Independent	K. Gurusamy	28,253	29.52%	New
CPI(M)	M. Seerangan	17,626	18.42%	New
Independent	T. M. Munusamy	2,754	2.88%	New
Independent	Kandasamy Vai	649	0.68%	New
Margin of victory		17,830	18.63%	−3.88%
Turnout		95,699	73.28%	6.23%
Registered electors		138,136		
AIADMK hold		Swing	-10.13%	

=== 1980 ===
1980 Tamil Nadu Legislative Assembly election: Mettur
Party	Candidate	Votes	%	±%
AIADMK	K. P. Nachimuthu Gounder	48,845	58.28%	+14.61
DMK	S. Kandappan	29,977	35.77%	+20.89
JP	M. C. Pachaiapan	4,560	5.44%	New
Margin of victory		18,868	22.51%	−1.32%
Turnout		83,810	67.06%	9.26%
Registered electors		126,625		
AIADMK hold		Swing	14.61%	

=== 1977 ===
1977 Tamil Nadu Legislative Assembly election: Mettur
Party	Candidate	Votes	%	±%
AIADMK	K. P. Nachimuthu Gounder	30,762	43.67%	New
INC	P. Natesan	13,976	19.84%	−18.05
JP	G. A. Vadivelu	13,448	19.09%	New
DMK	L. K. Ramu	10,478	14.88%	New
Independent	T. Obuli	910	1.29%	New
Independent	M. Madalaimuthu	530	0.75%	New
Margin of victory		16,786	23.83%	4.27%
Turnout		70,436	57.79%	−5.07%
Registered electors		123,548		
AIADMK gain from PSP		Swing	-13.77%	

=== 1971 ===
1971 Tamil Nadu Legislative Assembly election: Mettur
Party	Candidate	Votes	%	±%
PSP	M. Surendran	32,656	57.45%	New
INC	Karuppanna Gounder	21,538	37.89%	−1.28
Independent	Sengoda Gounder	2,650	4.66%	New
Margin of victory		11,118	19.56%	9.94%
Turnout		56,844	62.86%	−12.07%
Registered electors		97,813		
PSP hold		Swing	8.67%	

=== 1967 ===
1967 Madras Legislative Assembly election: Mettur
Party	Candidate	Votes	%	±%
PSP	M. Surendran	30,635	48.78%	New
INC	K. K. Gounder	24,597	39.17%	+5.12
Independent	R. S. Kandasami	5,950	9.47%	New
Independent	M. Arulsami	1,619	2.58%	New
Margin of victory		6,038	9.61%	8.78%
Turnout		62,801	74.93%	6.00%
Registered electors		89,534		
PSP gain from INC		Swing	14.74%	

=== 1962 ===
1962 Madras Legislative Assembly election: Mettur
Party	Candidate	Votes	%	±%
INC	K. S. Ardhanareeswara Gounder	18,065	34.04%	−11.6
PSP	M. Surendram	17,620	33.21%	New
DMK	Paul Cruz	8,497	16.01%	New
CPI	P. Ardhanari	8,295	15.63%	New
Independent	Arulsamy	586	1.10%	New
Margin of victory		445	0.84%	−11.32%
Turnout		53,063	68.93%	27.63%
Registered electors		79,747		
INC hold		Swing	-11.60%	

=== 1957 ===
1957 Madras Legislative Assembly election: Mettur
Party	Candidate	Votes	%	±%
INC	K. S. Ardhanareeswara Gounder	15,491	45.65%	New
PSP	Surendiran	11,366	33.49%	New
Independent	Chinnasamy	5,119	15.08%	New
Independent	Narayanasami	1,959	5.77%	New
Margin of victory		4,125	12.16%	
Turnout		33,935	41.29%	
Registered electors		82,184		
INC win (new seat)				
