= Pennagaram Assembly constituency =

State Legislative Assembly Constituency in Tamil Nadu

Coordinates: 12.13°N 77.9°E

Pennagaram
- Constituency No. 58 for the Tamil Nadu Legislative Assembly

Constituency details
- Country: India
- Region: South India
- State: Tamil Nadu
- District: Dharmapuri
- Lok Sabha constituency: Dharmapuri
- Established: 1951
- Total electors: 2,48,832

Member of Legislative Assembly
- 17th Tamil Nadu Legislative Assembly
- Incumbent S. Gajendran
- Party: TVK
- Elected year: 2026

Pennagaram is a state assembly constituency in Dharmapuri district in Tamil Nadu, India. Its State Assembly Constituency number is 58. It comprises Pennagaram taluk and a portion of Palacode taluk. It is a part of Dharmapuri Lok Sabha constituency for national elections to the Parliament of India. It is one of the 234 State Legislative Assembly Constituencies in Tamil Nadu, in India.

== Members of Legislative Assembly ==
Year	Member	Political party
Madras State
1952	S. Kandaswami Gounder	Tamil Nadu Toilers' Party
1957	S. Hemalatha Devi	Indian National Congress
1962	M. V. Karivengadam	Dravida Munnetra Kazhagam
1967	P. K. C. Muthusamy	Indian National Congress
Tamil Nadu
1971	N. Manickam	Dravida Munnetra Kazhagam
1977	K. Appunu Gounder	Janata Party
1980	P. Theertha Raman	Gandhi Kamaraj National Congress
1984	H. G. Arumugam	All India Anna Dravida Munnetra Kazhagam
1989	N. Nanjappan	Independent
1991	V. Purushothaman	All India Anna Dravida Munnetra Kazhagam
1996	G. K. Mani	Pattali Makkal Katchi
2001	G. K. Mani	Pattali Makkal Katchi
2006	P. N. Periannan	Dravida Munnetra Kazhagam
2010	P. N. P. Inbasekaran	Dravida Munnetra Kazhagam
2011	N. Nanjappan	Communist Party of India
2016	P. N. P. Inbasekharan	Dravida Munnetra Kazhagam
2021	G. K. Mani	Pattali Makkal Katchi
2026	S. Gajendran	Tamilaga Vettri Kazhagam

== Election results ==
Vote share of winning candidates
2026	35.53%
2021	50.46%
2016	38.49%
2011	49.31%
2010 by-election	45.48%
2006	49.43%
2001	44.08%
1996	31.63%
1991	51.79%
1989	21.09%
1984	54.98%
1980	52.74%
1977	32.13%
1971	52.36%
1967	49.20%
1962	53.86%
1957	31.59%
1952	29.32%

=== 2026 ===
2026 Tamil Nadu Legislative Assembly election: Pennagaram
Party	Candidate	Votes	%	±%
TVK	Gajendran. S	81,240	35.53	New
PMK	Selvam. V	78,075	34.14	▼16.32
INC	G. K. M. Tamil Kumaran	53,901	23.57	New
NTK	T. Palaniyammal	7,358	3.22	▼1.03
NOTA	NOTA	674	0.29	▼0.55
Margin of victory		3,165	1.39	▼8.68
Turnout		2,28,666	91.90	▲6.68
Registered electors		2,48,832		▲2,060
TVK gain from PMK		Swing	New	

=== 2021 ===
2021 Tamil Nadu Legislative Assembly election: Pennagaram
Party	Candidate	Votes	%	±%
PMK	G. K. Mani	106,123	50.46%	+21.21
DMK	P. N. P. Inbasekaran	84,937	40.39%	+1.89
NTK	R. Tamilazhagan	8,945	4.25%	New
DMDK	R. Uthayakumar	2,921	1.39%	New
Independent	A. Periyananjappan	1,968	0.94%	New
NOTA	NOTA	1,759	0.84%	−0.21
MNM	K. Shakila	1,471	0.70%	New
Margin of victory		21,186	10.07%	0.83%
Turnout		210,305	85.22%	−2.82%
Rejected ballots		437	0.21%	
Registered electors		246,772		
PMK gain from DMK		Swing	11.97%	

=== 2016 ===
2016 Tamil Nadu Legislative Assembly election: Pennagaram
Party	Candidate	Votes	%	±%
DMK	P. N. P. Inbasekaran	76,848	38.49%	−3.71
PMK	Anbumani Ramadoss	58,402	29.25%	New
AIADMK	K. P. Munusamy	51,687	25.89%	New
CPI	N. Nanjappan	5,624	2.82%	−46.5
NOTA	NOTA	2,081	1.04%	New
Margin of victory		18,446	9.24%	2.13%
Turnout		199,635	88.04%	5.03%
Registered electors		226,746		
DMK gain from CPI		Swing	-10.82%	

=== 2011 ===
2011 Tamil Nadu Legislative Assembly election: Pennagaram
Party	Candidate	Votes	%	±%
CPI	N. Nanjappan	80,028	49.31%	New
DMK	P. N. P. Inbasekaran	68,485	42.20%	−7.23
Independent	M. Munusamy	3,047	1.88%	New
BJP	K. P. Kandasamy	2,660	1.64%	+1.02
Independent	R. Shanmugam	1,546	0.95%	New
BSP	M. Venkatesan	1,478	0.91%	New
Independent	P. Muniappan	1,208	0.74%	New
Independent	K. K. Samykannu	853	0.53%	New
Margin of victory		11,543	7.11%	−10.85%
Turnout		162,288	83.02%	10.96%
Registered electors		195,492		
CPI gain from DMK		Swing	-0.12%	

=== 2010 by-election ===
2009–10 Tamil Nadu Legislative Assembly by-elections: Pennagaram
Party	Candidate	Votes	%	±%
DMK	P. N. P Inbasekaran	77,669	45.48%	
PMK	G. K. M. Tamil Kumaran	41,285	24.17%	
AIADMK	R. Anbazhagan	26,787	15.68%	
DMDK	Kaveryverman	11,406	6.67%	
Majority		36,386	14.6%	
Turnout		1,70,755	84.95%	
DMK hold		Swing		

=== 2006 ===
2006 Tamil Nadu Legislative Assembly election: Pennagaram
Party	Candidate	Votes	%	±%
DMK	P. N. Periannan	74,109	49.43%	+33.84
AIADMK	S. R. Vetrivel	47,177	31.47%	New
DMDK	P. Dhandapani	10,567	7.05%	New
Independent	V. Muthulakshme	9,871	6.58%	New
Independent	M. Balamurugan	1,738	1.16%	New
Independent	E. Periyannan	1,269	0.85%	New
Independent	K. Murugan	1,010	0.67%	New
BJP	K. P. Kandasami	933	0.62%	New
Margin of victory		26,932	17.96%	5.05%
Turnout		149,932	72.05%	16.29%
Registered electors		208,084		
DMK gain from PMK		Swing	5.35%	

=== 2001 ===
2001 Tamil Nadu Legislative Assembly election: Pennagaram
Party	Candidate	Votes	%	±%
PMK	G. K. Mani	49,125	44.08%	+12.45
Independent	K. N. Periannan	34,729	31.16%	New
DMK	M. Kumar	17,371	15.59%	New
Independent	K. N. Periannan	2,290	2.05%	New
MDMK	K. E. Sekar	1,466	1.32%	−0.15
Independent	N. Murugan	1,404	1.26%	New
Independent	K. Anbalagan	1,318	1.18%	New
UCPI	P. Ravi	1,262	1.13%	New
BSP	C. K. Murugan	1,245	1.12%	New
Independent	T. C. Anbalagan	725	0.65%	New
Margin of victory		14,396	12.92%	12.55%
Turnout		111,444	55.76%	−9.07%
Registered electors		199,848		
PMK hold		Swing	12.45%	

=== 1996 ===
1996 Tamil Nadu Legislative Assembly election: Pennagaram
Party	Candidate	Votes	%	±%
PMK	G. K. Mani	34,906	31.63%	New
CPI	M. Arumugam	34,500	31.26%	+15.77
AIADMK	R. Anbalagan	25,217	22.85%	−28.94
UCPI	N. Nanjappan	11,717	10.62%	New
MDMK	K. E. Sekar	1,616	1.46%	New
BJP	K. P. Kandasamy	682	0.62%	New
Independent	K. Rajendran	611	0.55%	New
Margin of victory		406	0.37%	−19.30%
Turnout		110,373	64.83%	2.15%
Registered electors		184,582		
PMK gain from AIADMK		Swing	-20.16%	

=== 1991 ===
1991 Tamil Nadu Legislative Assembly election: Pennagaram
Party	Candidate	Votes	%	±%
AIADMK	V. Purushothaman	49,585	51.79%	+31.98
PMK	N. M. Subramaniam	30,757	32.12%	New
CPI	M. Arumugam	14,830	15.49%	New
Margin of victory		18,828	19.66%	18.38%
Turnout		95,746	62.69%	11.16%
Registered electors		160,888		
AIADMK gain from Independent		Swing	30.69%	

=== 1989 ===
1989 Tamil Nadu Legislative Assembly election: Pennagaram
Party	Candidate	Votes	%	±%
Independent	N. Nanjappan	15,498	21.09%	New
AIADMK	P. Srinivasan	14,555	19.81%	−35.17
AIADMK	M. Rajarathanam	9,808	13.35%	−41.63
JP	S. Kumaran	9,209	12.53%	New
Independent	R. Rajamanikkam	8,877	12.08%	New
Independent	M. Lakshmanan	7,364	10.02%	New
Independent	V. Chandiran	2,571	3.50%	New
Independent	S. K. G. Gunalan	2,431	3.31%	New
Independent	A. Kannan	660	0.90%	New
Independent	C. Karunanidhi	628	0.85%	New
Independent	P. Samraj	550	0.75%	New
Margin of victory		943	1.28%	−22.25%
Turnout		73,468	51.53%	−16.50%
Registered electors		147,380		
Independent gain from AIADMK		Swing	-33.89%	

=== 1984 ===
1984 Tamil Nadu Legislative Assembly election: Pennagaram
Party	Candidate	Votes	%	±%
AIADMK	H. G. Arumugam	44,616	54.98%	New
CPI	N. Nanjappan	25,518	31.45%	New
Independent	N. M. Subramaniam	9,580	11.81%	New
Independent	S. Samadharamam	747	0.92%	New
Independent	M. Murugesan	682	0.84%	New
Margin of victory		19,098	23.54%	12.70%
Turnout		81,143	68.03%	8.87%
Registered electors		126,479		
AIADMK gain from GKC		Swing	2.25%	

=== 1980 ===
1980 Tamil Nadu Legislative Assembly election: Pennagaram
Party	Candidate	Votes	%	±%
GKC	P. Theertha Raman	34,590	52.74%	New
DMK	K. Marumuthu	27,481	41.90%	+26.4
JP	K. Appunu Gounder	3,520	5.37%	New
Margin of victory		7,109	10.84%	9.63%
Turnout		65,591	59.16%	3.82%
Registered electors		112,908		
GKC gain from JP		Swing	20.61%	

=== 1977 ===
1977 Tamil Nadu Legislative Assembly election: Pennagaram
Party	Candidate	Votes	%	±%
JP	K. Appunu Gounder	17,591	32.13%	New
AIADMK	Krishnan	16,932	30.92%	New
INC	B. K. Narasimhan	11,086	20.25%	−27.39
DMK	K. Marimuthu	8,487	15.50%	−36.86
Independent	K. M. Munniappan	660	1.21%	New
Margin of victory		659	1.20%	−3.53%
Turnout		54,756	55.34%	−13.53%
Registered electors		100,327		
JP gain from DMK		Swing	-20.24%	

=== 1971 ===
1971 Tamil Nadu Legislative Assembly election: Pennagaram
Party	Candidate	Votes	%	±%
DMK	N. Manickkam	33,298	52.36%	+5.53
INC	P. K. C. Muthuswami	30,291	47.64%	−1.57
Margin of victory		3,007	4.73%	2.36%
Turnout		63,589	68.87%	3.89%
Registered electors		99,155		
DMK gain from INC		Swing	3.16%	

=== 1967 ===
1967 Madras Legislative Assembly election: Pennagaram
Party	Candidate	Votes	%	±%
INC	P. K. C. Muthusamy	27,913	49.20%	+14.57
DMK	N. Manickam	26,570	46.84%	−7.02
CPI	R. P. Gounder	2,246	3.96%	New
Margin of victory		1,343	2.37%	−16.86%
Turnout		56,729	64.98%	12.41%
Registered electors		90,966		
INC gain from DMK		Swing	-4.65%	

=== 1962 ===
1962 Madras Legislative Assembly election: Pennagaram
Party	Candidate	Votes	%	±%
DMK	M. V. Karivengadam	26,911	53.86%	New
INC	S. Hemalatha Devi	17,303	34.63%	+3.04
Independent	R. S. Veerappa Chettiar	2,995	5.99%	New
SWA	B. Munisami Gounder	1,623	3.25%	New
Independent	M. R. Rajan	1,134	2.27%	New
Margin of victory		9,608	19.23%	7.53%
Turnout		49,966	52.57%	21.45%
Registered electors		99,007		
DMK gain from INC		Swing	22.27%	

=== 1957 ===
1957 Madras Legislative Assembly election: Pennagaram
Party	Candidate	Votes	%	±%
INC	S. Hemalatha Devi	8,791	31.59%	New
Independent	D. K. Gorunatha Chettiar	5,536	19.89%	New
Independent	Thandavan	3,443	12.37%	New
Independent	M. B. Munussamy Gounder	3,165	11.37%	New
Independent	S. Kandasami Gounder	3,017	10.84%	New
Independent	Govindan	2,297	8.25%	New
Independent	Latchumi	864	3.10%	New
Independent	Manthiri Thayappa Gounder	717	2.58%	New
Margin of victory		3,255	11.70%	7.40%
Turnout		27,830	31.12%	−11.80%
Registered electors		89,416		
INC gain from TTP		Swing	2.27%	

=== 1952 ===
1952 Madras Legislative Assembly election: Pennagaram
Party	Candidate	Votes	%	±%
TTP	S. Kandaswami Gounder	8,050	29.32%	New
Independent	M. N. Raja Chettiar	6,870	25.02%	New
Independent	R. Subbarao	6,261	22.81%	New
Independent	Dhaddi Alias Perumalu	5,181	18.87%	New
Independent	P. M. Pachiappa Gounder	1,092	3.98%	New
Margin of victory		1,180	4.30%	
Turnout		27,454	42.93%	
Registered electors		63,955		
TTP win (new seat)				
