= Sabujpatra =

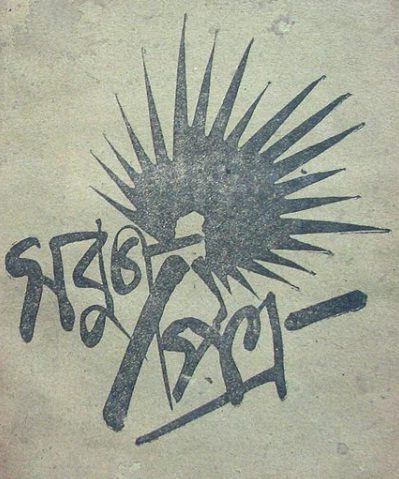
- Editor: Pramatha Chaudhuri
- Founded: 1914
- Final issue: 1927
- Country: India
- Language: Bengali

Sabujpatra, also known as 'Sabuj Patra' (English: Green Leaf) was liberal and pro-Tagore Bengali magazine. It was named Sabujpatra as its cover page was illustrated by a green palmleaf drawn by Nandalal Bose (no other colors were ever used). It was edited by Pramatha Chaudhuri and first published on 25th Baishakh 1321 BS (April 1914). The magazine had no advertisements and no pictures. In the first phase it was being published up to 1329 BS (1922). Its second phase started in 1332 BS. The magazine folded in 1334 BS (1927).

Short-lived, Sabujpatra was a major force in remolding Bengali language and literary style for the post-First World War generation. Pramatha Choudhury preferred spoken Bengali to the written and a new style of writing, often called 'Birbali', after his pseudonym 'Birbal'. From then on colloquial Bengali dominated the Bengali literary scene.

Sabujpatra initially contained writings from Rabindranath Tagore, Satyendranath Dutta and the editor himself. Some of the intellectuals who gathered around Pramatha Chowdhury became literary luminaries later. Dhurjatiprasad Mukhopadhyay, Atul Chandra Gupta, Barada Charan Gupta, Suniti Kumar Chatterji, Kiran Shankar Roy wrote articles in Sabujpatra; Kanti Chandra Ghosh, Amiya Chakraborty and Suresh Chakraborty contributed poems. In everything it published, Sabujpatra expressed the spirit of freethinking and advocated rationalism, democracy and individual freedom.

Paschimbanga Bangla Akademi Library, Kolkata has archived a complete set of Sabujpatra.

== Rabindranath Tagore and Sabuj Patra ==
Rabindranath Tagore was a regular contributor to Sabuj Patra. Many of his early 20th century works including the Balaka poems, two of his novels, Ghare Baire and Chaturanga, a play titled Phalguni and a considerable lot of short stories and essays were published in this journal.

In Sabuj Patra, Tagore expressed his revolutionary view on society and political situations of contemporary times through his fiction and prose. Haimanti and Streer Patra caused a frown of contemporary Bengali society as well as his essays Bastab and Lokohito were severely attacked in conservative journals like Sahitya and Narayan.

== Other contributors ==
- Kiran Shankar Roy,
- Satyendra Nath Bose
- Barada Charan Gupta
- Suniti Kumar Chatterji
