= S. Gajendran =

Indian politician

Member of the Tamil Nadu Legislative Assembly
- Incumbent
- Assumed office 6 May 2026
- Preceded by: G. K. Mani
- Constituency: Pennagaram

Personal details
- Born: 1983 (age 42–43)
- Party: Tamilaga Vettri Kazhagam
- Profession: Politician

Sendrayan Gajendran is an Indian politician from Tamil Nadu. He is a member of the Tamil Nadu Legislative Assembly from Pennagaram representing Tamilaga Vettri Kazhagam.

== Early life and education ==
Gajendran is the son of Sendrayan. He is self-employed. He studied at Government Boys Higher Secondary School, Pennagaram, and completed his schooling in 1993.

== Political career ==
Gajendran won the Pennagaram seat in the 2026 Tamil Nadu Legislative Assembly election as a candidate of Tamilaga Vettri Kazhagam. He received 81,240 votes and defeated V. Selvam of the Pattali Makkal Katchi by a margin of 3,165 votes.
