= Prasannamoyee Devi =

Bengali poet and travel writer (1856–1939)

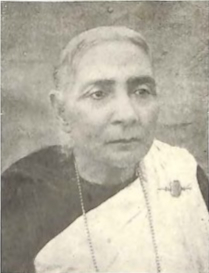
- Native name: প্রসন্নময়ী দেবী
- Born: 29 September 1856 Haripur, Pabna District, British Bengal
- Died: 25 October 1939 (aged 83)
- Occupation: Poet, travel writer and memoirist
- Literary movement: Bengal Renaissance
- Notable works: Aryavarta: Janaika Bangamahilar Bhraman Brittanta (1888)
- Children: Priyamvada Devi
- Relatives: Pramatha Chaudhuri (brother); Kumudnath Chaudhuri (brother)

Prasannamoyee Devi (Bengali: প্রসন্নময়ী দেবী, née Chaudhuri, 29 September 1856 – 25 October 1939) was a Bengali poet, travel writer and memoirist of the Bengali Renaissance period. Her work Aryavarta: Janaika Bangamahilar Bhraman Brittanta (1888) was the first published travel account of India by a Bengali woman.

== Family and background ==
Devi was born on 29 September 1856 into a wealthy Hindu zamindari family in the village of Haripur, Pabna District, Mughal Empire, (the area became part of the British Raj in 1858 and is today part of Bangladesh). Devi wrote in her autobiography that her father Durgadas Chowdhury lived in Murshidabad in West Bengal with family during the 1850s.

Devi was primarily educated in the family home, but also used to dress as a boy to go to Kachhari Bari for studies outside of the home. She was tutored in Bengali, English, and Sanskrit.

Devi was married to zamindari Krishna Kumar Bagchi of Gunaigachha in the Pabna District when she was aged ten. She gave birth to their daughter Priyamvada Devi in 1871, who would become a writer, teacher and philanthropist.

After her daughter's birth Devi refused to live with her husband in his rural home, and lived instead in her father and brothers home, which was frequented the Tagore family.

== Career ==
=== Fiction ===
Davi published her first book of short poems, Adh-Adh Bhashini, when she was aged 12. She contributed poems to journals including Matri Mandir and Bharatbarsha (established by Dwijendralal Ray).

Devi published Banalata, a collection of poetry. The Calcutta Review wrote that the work:

"consists of several short poems on a variety of subjects which bear the impress of a mind emancipated from the thraldom of... Juthi, Mallika, Malati [names of flowers commons in Bengali households] of bygone ages, and awakening to an appreciative perception of the beautiful, the grand and the sublime not simply in terrestrial objects, but likewise in the phenomenal aspects of Nature, in all her immensity."

Other works of poetry by Devi include Banalata (1880) and Niharika (1884). Her novel Ashok was set during the time of the Indian Rebellion of 1857.

=== Travel writing ===
Devi's travel writing was shaped by both the Hindu-revivalist nationalism and the colonial modernity of the 1870s in British India. Her work Aryavarta: Janaika Bangamahilar Bhraman Brittanta (1888) was the first published travel account of India by a Bengali woman and differed from the rational, scientific travel writing produced by professional historians. She mapped in the tradition of Bengali scholars like Rajendralal Mitra and drew on Bankim Chandra Chatterjee's ideas of promoting a non-positivist history with mytho-religious temporality for Bengali identity, in opposition to the European notion of linear history. She also tried to understand through her travel writing "what led to the downfall of India from the glorious Aryan (ancient Indo-Iranian) past."

Devi wrote of the civil station Krishnanangar as an exotic and green idyll. She wrote of her fascination with the architecture of the Taj Mahal in Agra constructed by Shah Jahan for his wife Mumtaz Mahal and the Sheesh Mahal near Sikandra constructed by Raja Man Singh I for his sister. However, she also praised an article written by an Englishman for The Statesman newspaper which argued that the money spent building the mausoleums would have been better spent on the "public good."

== Death ==
Devi died on 25 October 1939, aged 83.
