= Tracy Park =

Estate near Wick, South Gloucestershire, England

Coordinates: 51.445°N 2.414°W

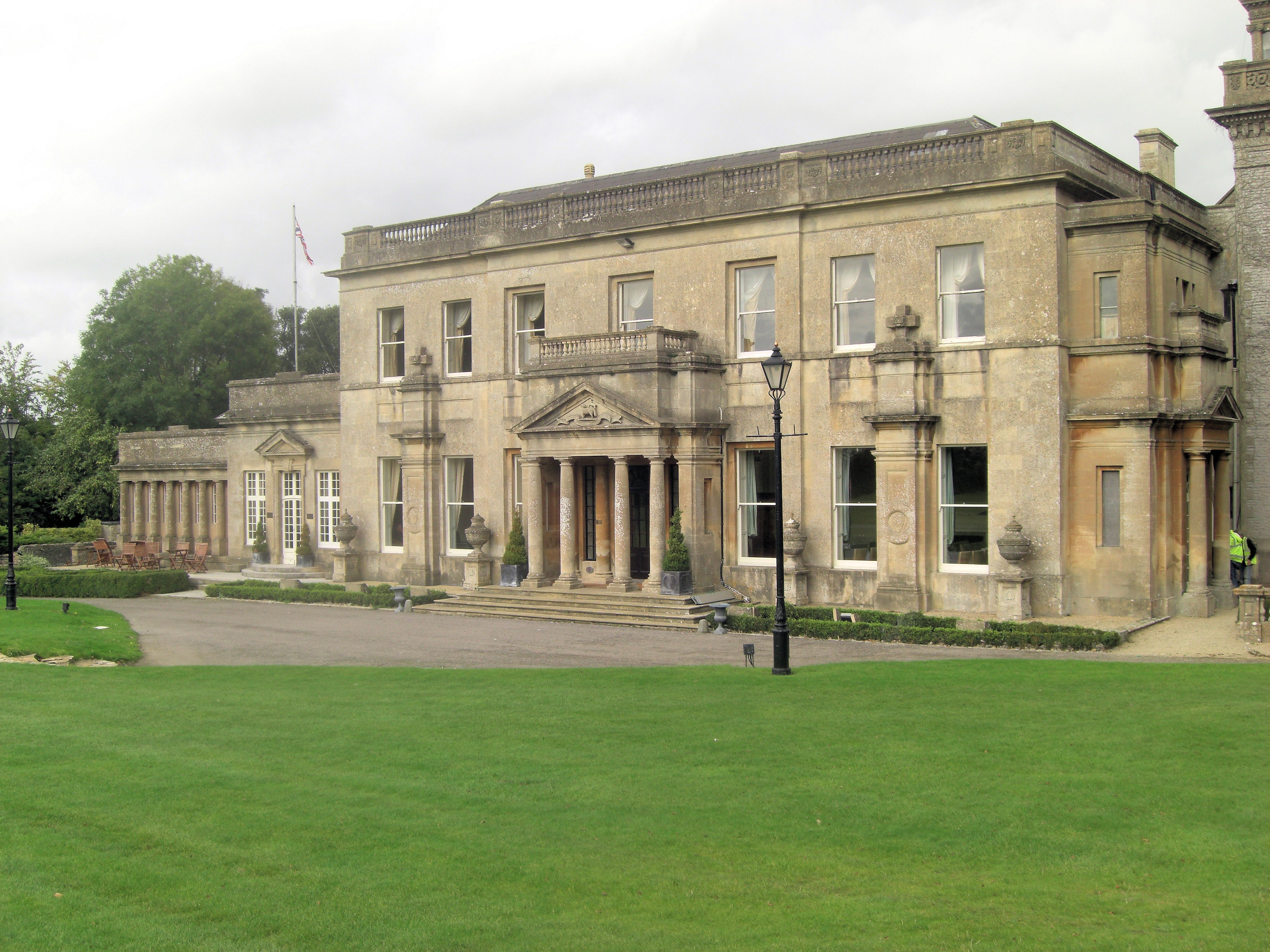
Tracy Park house, south facade.

Tracy Park is an estate near Wick, South Gloucestershire, close to the boundary with Bath and North East Somerset and approximately 5 miles (8.0 km) from the World Heritage City of Bath. Set in approximately 240 acres (97 ha) of parkland, the house is a Grade II listed building. It has a 17th-century nucleus behind a classical two-storey front built of Ashlar stone. The gate piers either side of the carriageway leading to the house are also Grade II listed.

The estate is documented from 1246. Throughout the 17th and most of the 18th centuries, the estate was owned by a succession of Bristol merchants and tradesmen, culminating in Robert Bush, a pewterer, who purchased the estate in 1774. His son, Robert, constructed a classical façade in c. 1800, obscuring much of the original building. Sold for more than £12,000 to General Sir William Gabriel Davy in 1820, it was much altered and rebuilt by his son, a prominent Freemason, who adorned the estate with many Masonic symbols. The estate again changed hands in 1926. The mansion ceased to be a private house in 1973, when it was auctioned and subsequently became a golf and country club and hotel.

== Early history ==
During the Roman occupation of Britain, a large villa was sited on what is today the Tracy park estate. It was excavated in 1865, when it was found that the villa had once been enclosed by earthworks encompassing some two acres of land. Standing stones, thought to be the remains of a long barrow, just under a mile from the house, suggest that the site was occupied at an even earlier date. The present site became the property of John de Tracye in 1246; the park probably constituted 100 acres of land at the bottom of Freezing Hill and his manor house was likely near the church and not in the park, although its exact location is unknown. His descendants, Lords of the Manor of Doynton, held the property until the end of the 16th century.

General Sir William Gabriel Davy who bought Tracy Park in 1820; his descendants owned the estate until 1926.

The estate was purchased from John de Tracye's descendants in 1595 by William Wintor, who likely built the house a few years later. It was a small gabled building, known in the 17th century as Well House. By 1718, it had a hall and kitchen and, in the 18th century, sat in a park comprising 200 acres of land. The estate was owned by a succession of Bristol tradesmen, ending with Robert Bush, a successful Bristol pewterer, who purchased the house in 1774 for £6,250. Bush's son, Robert, inherited the estate. Most traces of the 17th-century house were obscured when he rebuilt it and gave it a classical façade in c. 1800. In 1820, Bush sold the estate to General Sir William Gabriel Davy (1780–1856) for £12,818, and it was his son, Rev. Charles Raikes Davy (1819-1885), who after inheriting the estate from his father in 1856, was responsible for the size and appearance of the house and estate seen today.

Charles Raikes Davy began a program of rebuilding the mansion in 1858; datestones bear the years 1858, 1859, 1863, 1864 and 1871. He is thought to have commissioned the Bath architect John Elkington Gill to aggrandise the early 19th-century architecture. Gill retained the western façade, but embellished the slightly projecting central three bays with an overpowering Doric tetrastyle porch. It was during this rebuilding that two large pilasters were added to the western façade. In keeping with the mid-Victorian fashion for housing the growing number of servants in a separate wing, Gill also designed the large south-eastern service wing; this was designed in a loose Tudor Gothic style, linked to the main house by a belvedere. In addition to his work on the house, Davy was also responsible for building the dry-stone walls enclosing the property, and many of the estate buildings.

== Description ==
The north-west entrance to the estate is through two tall mid-19th century gate piers, which are Grade II listed. These are constructed principally of rubble, but dressed with bath stone ashlar which frames heraldry peculiar to the Davy family. The piers are crowned by double cross finials. These piers clearly reflect the unusual design of the large buttresses on the south face of the mansion. Opposite the entrance piers, and deliberately complementing them, is a three-story farmhouse built in about 1845; this has been given heavy Grecian detailing, a blind pediment and a classical balustrade to its precincts. The southwest entrance is also through high gate piers, but these are cylindrical and of a simpler, chaste design than those of the northeast entrance.

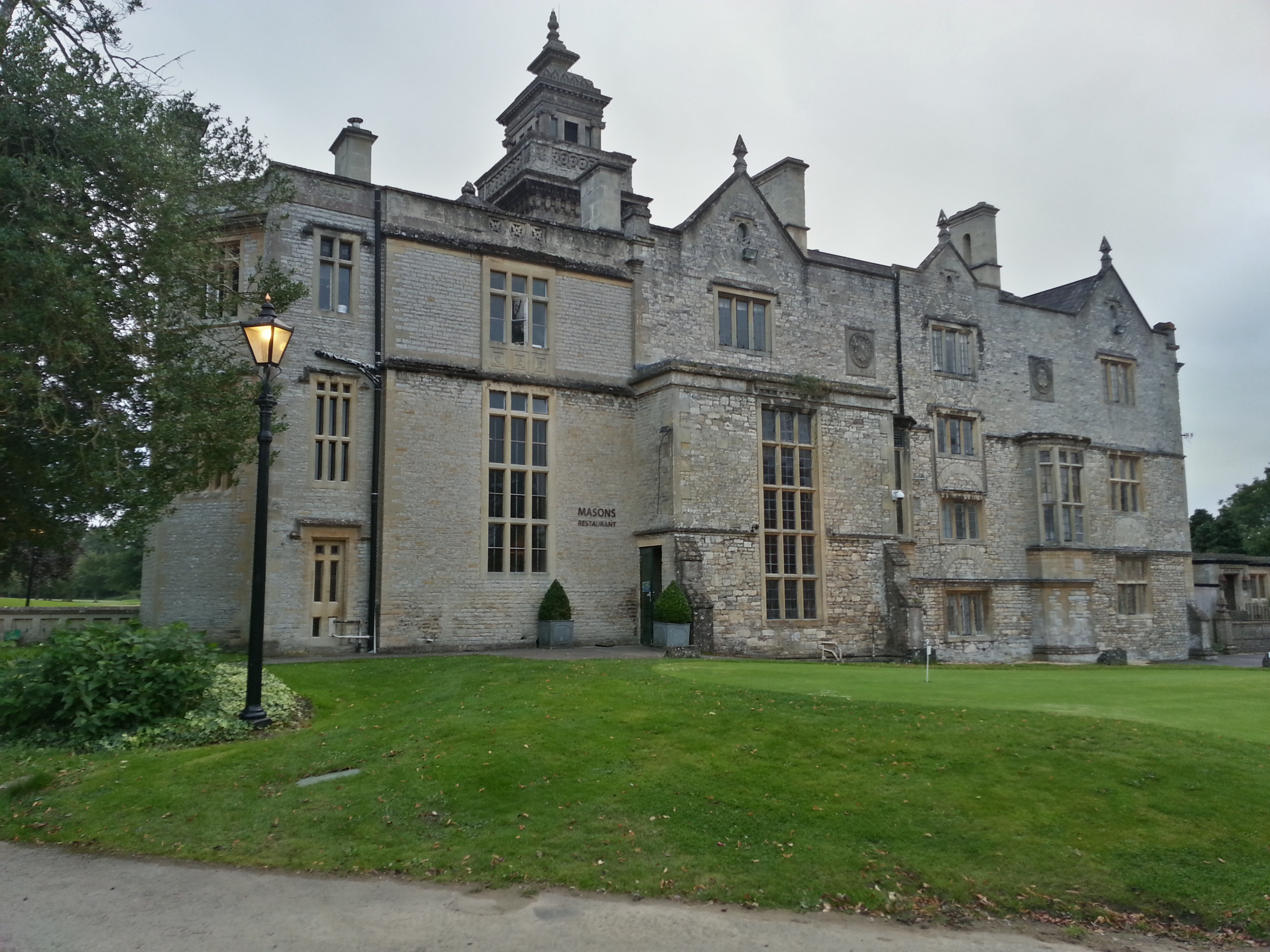
The mostly 19th-century rear facade; the finial of the belvedere tower can be seen above the roof-line.

Tracy Park gives its name to the Grade II listed mansion situated within its grounds. The house has a 17th-century nucleus, but has been remodelled externally. Its two-storey western façade of seven bays, in a classical style built of limestone ashlar, dates from circa 1800. The slightly protruding central three bays contain the main entrance which is through a later Doric tetrastyle porch; the tympanum within the porch's pediment contains a lamb and flag motif, while the entablature bears the motto "In hoc signo vinces." Two large pilasters sit between the outer pairs of windows on either side of the facade; perhaps intended to complement the porch, they rise only to the first floor and are crowned with heavy stone crosses. This porch is part of the remodeling of the house by Charles Raikes Davy. On the western facade's left side is a single-story 19th century extension; it has a central door (beneath a pediment) between two windows. Attached to the left is a lower extension, dating to c. 1920, with an arcade of eight Doric columns.

A 19th-century belvedere tower to the right of the house's western elevation links the main building to the service wing. It is described by Verey and Brookes as containing "over-elaborate Grecian detail." The unusual design of the tower is very much in the style of the 19th-century architect Alexander Thomson. Classical Greek architecture did not feature towers, therefore the tower would have been the unknown architect's own interpretation and explain why the "Grecian" tower contains both Greek and provincial Italian elements - such a tower is a feature of Italianate architecture derived from the look-out and campanile towers of the Italian Renaissance. Tracy Park's tower has an upper-most floor, completely surrounded by a slightly projecting Italiante balcony, supported by corbels, appears as a rectangular cupola and has Ionic pilasters at each corner; this structure is surmounted with a large finial.

Much of the rear facade of the house was remodeled in the 19th century in a Tudor Gothic style. However, the haphazard fenestration suggesting mezzanine floors, and stonework and the need for a low buttress suggest that the lower floors, at least, may belong to the 16th and 17th centuries. Facing the rear are a number of outbuildings, including the former stables, which date from 1849 to 1860.

As of 2015, the Tracy Park estate consists of approximately 240 acres (97 ha) of land. Historically, the size varied: when sold by the Bush family in 1820, to William Davy, the estate consisted of just 120 acres (49 ha); nineteen years later, the estate was further reduced to 67 acres (27 ha), although it was expanded in the 19th century by Rev. Charles Raikes Davy.

== Freemasonry ==
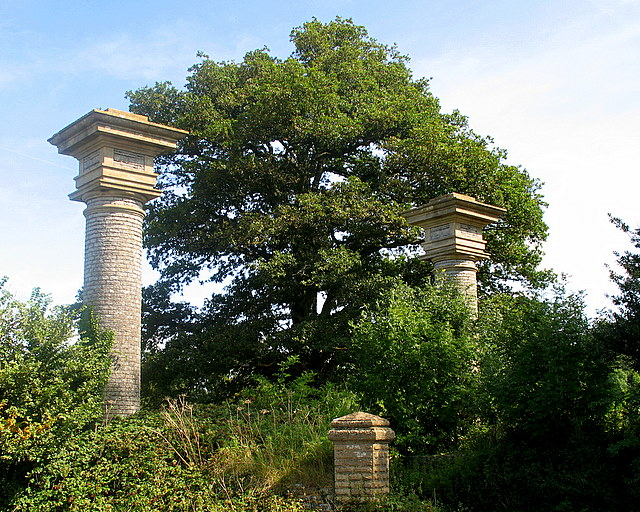
The southwest entrance to the park is through cylindrical high gate piers. These represent the Temple of Solomon's pillars, a Masonic device.

Tracy Park contains symbols of Freemasonry and the associated Knights Templar; these date to the occupation of the house by Rev. Charles Raikes Davy, who inherited the estate in 1856 and died in 1885. An Anglican priest, educated at Balliol College, Oxford, Davy was described in local newspaper reports as popular amongst Masonic groups in Gloucestershire due to his "devotion to the general interests of Masonry"; he was Grand Chaplain to the Grand Lodge of Freemasons and also Provincial Grand Master of Mark Masons for Gloucester. He added extensively to the estate in the 1850s, 1860s and early 1870s.

Amongst these additions are symbols associated with freemasonry: the cross of Lorraine finials crowning the main entrance piers; the twin cylindrical gate piers at the south-west entrance bear resemblance to the twin pillars, Boaz and Jachin; and the deep engravings in an overmantel in what is now the hotel restaurant, described by English Heritage as "masonic emblems". Other Masonic references include the motto "In hoc signo vinces" carved above the mansion's principal entrance, taken from the standard of a Commander of the Knights Templar. On the south front are paneled twin buttresses, flanking the entrance and crowned with crosses, which seem to serve no structural purpose; they are possibly a further reference to the pillars of Boaz and Jachin. The lamb and flag motif carved into the pediment of the entrance porch is not only the crest of the Davy family, but also a symbol of the Knights Templar and Freemasonry.

== Modern history ==
Part of the Cromwell golf course in 2011, which was in situ from roughly 1974 to 2024. Lansdown Hill can be seen in the distance.

Charles Raikes Davy died in 1885 and his son, William (1851−1915), inherited the estate. The younger Davy moved to St Ann's in Burnham and, by 1897, Tracy Park was unoccupied. After his death, the estate passed to his son, William James Davy, who had lived in the United States and Ceylon before joining the Ceylon Rifles at the outbreak of World War I; he fought with them in Gallipoli and France, but was killed in action in 1916. After his death, the estate passed to his sister, Helen Hodges (later known as Mrs Arthington-Davy).

In the family's absence, the house had been let from at least 1912 to Charles Samuel Clarke (1873−1947), a director of the Imperial Tobacco Company, who eventually bought the property from Helen Hodges in 1926. In July 1929, it was announced in The Times that the Davy heirlooms from Tracy Park were to be sold by Helen Arthington-Davy.

The Clark family remained in occupation of Tracy Park until the death of Charles Clark's widow, Elsie, in 1973; the estate was then put up for auction, after which it became a golf and country club hotel with two 18-hole courses, named the Crown and Cromwell. As a leisure complex, the estate was sold by Ian and Jane Knipe to TP Resorts in 2005; they bought it back in 2010 and, as of 2014, the Club is owned by Knipe and his wife, Ann. In August 2024 it was announced that the estate had been sold to a private buyer and that the golf club would cease to operate as a result.
