= S. R. Parthiban =

Indian politician

Member of Parliament
- In office 2 June 2019 – 4 June 2024
- Preceded by: V. Pannerselvam
- Succeeded by: T. M. Selvaganapathy
- Constituency: Salem (Lok Sabha constituency)

Member of Legislative Assembly
- In office 15 May 2011 – 15 May 2016
- Preceded by: G. K. Mani
- Succeeded by: S. Semmalai
- Constituency: Mettur (State Assembly Constituency)

S. R. Parthiban is an Indian politician and Ex-member of the Tamil Nadu Legislative Assembly from the Mettur constituency. He represented the Desiya Murpokku Dravidar Kazhagam party. Later he joined in DMK in 2016 and continued as a party activist in Dravida Munnetra Kazhagam.

After joining in DMK, he contested in state legislative assembly election from Mettur constituency in 2016 and lost by small marginal votes. He won the Lok Sabha Election in Salem constituency in 2019 by getting 6,06,302 votes (48.3%).
