= Scott Davie =

Scott Davie may refer to:

- Scott Davie (broadcaster), football commentator
- Scott Davie (pianist) (born 1966), Australian pianist
- Scott Davie (basketball) (born 1940), Australian basketball player
- Scott Davey, rugby player on List of Parramatta Eels players

== See also ==
- Scott Davies (disambiguation)
