= Scott B. Davis =

American photographer

- Born: 1971 (age 54–55)
- Education: University of New Mexico
- Occupation: Photographer

Scott B. Davis (born 1971) is an American photographer known for his black and white images of the Southern California landscape. Davis, who writes his name foregoing capitalization, utilizes a century-old platinum printing process and self-built camera to make 16" x 20" contact prints.

== Education ==
Davis holds a BFA in photography from the University of New Mexico, Albuquerque, NM.

== Photography ==
A resident of Southern California, Davis creates black and white photos of the landscape that contradict the expected Southern California image. Shooting primarily at night, Davis' photographs frequently depict desert or semi-industrialized locations in Southern California, showcasing the vast and empty qualities of the surroundings.
