= S. Sundarambal =

Indian politician

S. Sundarambal is an Indian politician and former Member of the Legislative Assembly of Tamil Nadu. She was elected to the Tamil Nadu legislative assembly from Mettur constituency as an Anna Dravida Munnetra Kazhagam candidate in 1991, and 2001 elections.
