= Darvi =

Darvi may refer to:

- Darvi, Govi-Altai, Mongolia
- Darvi, Khovd, Mongolia
- Bella Darvi
