= Davey Lake (Alberta) =

- Location within Alberta
- Location: Red Deer County, Alberta, Canada
- Coordinates: 51.9376°N 113.7638°W
- Type: lake

Davey Lake is a lake in Red Deer County, Alberta, Canada.

Davey Lake was named for a pioneer citizen.

== See also ==
- List of lakes of Alberta
