= Priyamvada Devi =

Bengali writer and philanthropist (1871–1935)

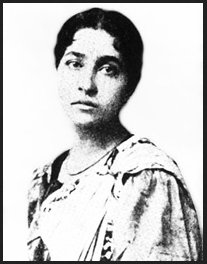
- Born: 1871; Gunaigacha, Pabna District, Bengal Presidency, British Raj
- Died: 1935 (aged 63–64)
- Occupations: Writer, Teacher
- Mother: Prasannamoyee Devi
- Relatives: Pramatha Chaudhuri (uncle)

Priyamvada Devi (1871–1935) was a Bengali writer and philanthropist.

== Early life ==
Devi was born in 1871 in Gunaigacha, Pabna District, Bengal Presidency, British Raj. Her mother, Prasannamoyee Devi, was a famous writer. Her father's name was Krishnakumar Bagchi. Her uncles Pramatha Chaudhuri and Ashutosh Chaudhuri were notable writers as well. She studied in Bethune School. She completed her Bachelor of Arts from the Bethune College in Kolkata.

== Career ==
Devi married Taradas Banerjee in 1892. Her husband was a lawyer. Her son died in 1896, after which she spend her time writing and engaged in her philanthropy work. She joined the Brahmo Balika Shikshalaya (Brahmo Girls' School) as a teacher. She served as the head of Bharat Stri-Mahamandal. She also worked in a number of educational institutions during this time.

Devi translated Svapnavasavadatta which was a Sanskrit play. She translated parts of the Bible and published it as Bhaktavani. Her notable novels included "Women of Japan", Katha O Upakatha, Jhilejabgale Shikar Anath, Pavchulal, and Renuka, a book about Geishas in Japan. She also wrote a number of poems including Tara, Angshu, Renu, and Champa O Parul. She directed plays for charity.
