= Raja Shyama Sankar =

Raja Shyama Sankar (1837 to 1893) was the Zamindar of Teota Estate of East Bengal. He was a capable landed aristocrat who invested in the development of agriculture and research.

== Biography ==
Sankar was born in 1837 in Teota Zamindar Family of Manikganj. His father was Tarini Sankar Chaudhuri was the Zamindar of the Teota Estate. He completed his education in Dhaka.

Sankar invested significant resources in improving agriculture and planting new crops. The investment came at significant financial cost to him and was contrary to the practices of his contemporary zamindars who were generally apathetic to the agricultural practices in their estates. In Dinajpur District, he tried to grow Ramie plant for its fiber but that ended in failure. His estate lost 20 thousand rupees in that experiment. He tried to farm a variety of sugarcanes. According to the District Magistrate and the Dacca gazetteer his experiments was usually met with indifference by the farmers. He and Parbati Sankar Roy Choudhury were known to be generous and considerate towards their tenants.

Sankar was a contributor and the Vice-President of the Theosophical Society. In the 1877 Delhi Durbar he was awarded the title of raja or Roy Bahadur by the Viceroy of India, Robert Bulwer-Lytton, 1st Earl of Lytton. He served as a member of the executive committee of the Indian Association from 1876 to 1877.

Sankar died in 1893.
