= Parbati Sankar Roy Choudhury =

Parbati Sankar Roy Choudhury (Rai Parvatisankara Chaudhuri), (1853–1918) was the zamindar of Teota (now in Manikganj District, Bangladesh) and a philanthropic landholder.

== Early life ==
Choudhury was born in 1853, and was the elder son of Joy Sankar Choudhuri of the Teota zamindars, who were one of the well-known zamindars of Bengal. Their ancestral surname was Dasgupta (Dash-sharma). He studied at the Hindu School, Kolkata but never completed his education as he was managing the zamidari estate.

== Career ==
Sankar was an active member of the British Indian Association, the Indian Association, the Indian National Congress, and the Dacca district board. He was also one of the founders of the Indian Industrial Association, which was set up to promote the material and economic development of the region. As part of the economic reconstruction programme, Parbati Sankar attempted to make use of the material raw resources available within the Teota zamindari (in Goalondo, Faridpur and elsewhere). His name is also associated with the formulation of a concrete and detailed plan (1890s) of extension of the railways to Manikganj, linking it up with the town of Dacca on the east and the river port of Goalando on the west.

Sankar is best remembered, however, for pioneering the 'dharmagola' system of co-operative grain banking, intended to alleviate scarcity and resulting famine. He founded the grain banks with his cousin Raja Shyama Sankar Ray. 'Dharmagolas' or grain banks were established at various places within the Teota Estate and elsewhere in Dinajpur and the system was a success. These grain banks were registered as formal co-operative societies in the second decade of the 20th century. Parbati Sankar wrote a number of articles in which he not only outlined the basic features of the 'dharmagola' system, but also clearly brought out its many virtues and advantages. He spoke on the "Indebtedness of the Bengal peasantry" at an annual session of the Congress (INC) in the early 1900s. He was a member of the Dhaka District Board. He had attempted to convince the British colonial administration of the importance creating a rail line from Dhaka to Manikganj unsuccessfully.

== Death ==
Sankar was honoured with the Kaisar-i-Hind Medal in 1912. He died in Calcutta in 1918.
