= P. N. Periannan =

Indian politician

P. N. Periannan was elected to the Tamil Nadu Legislative Assembly from the Pennagaram constituency in the 2006 election. He was a candidate of the Dravida Munnetra Kazhagam (DMK) party.Periyannan Died in 2009. His Position was succeeded by his son P. N. P. Inbasekharan in 2010 Bypoll.

He died at a private hospital in Chennai in December 2009.
