= P. N. P. Inbasekharan =

Indian politician

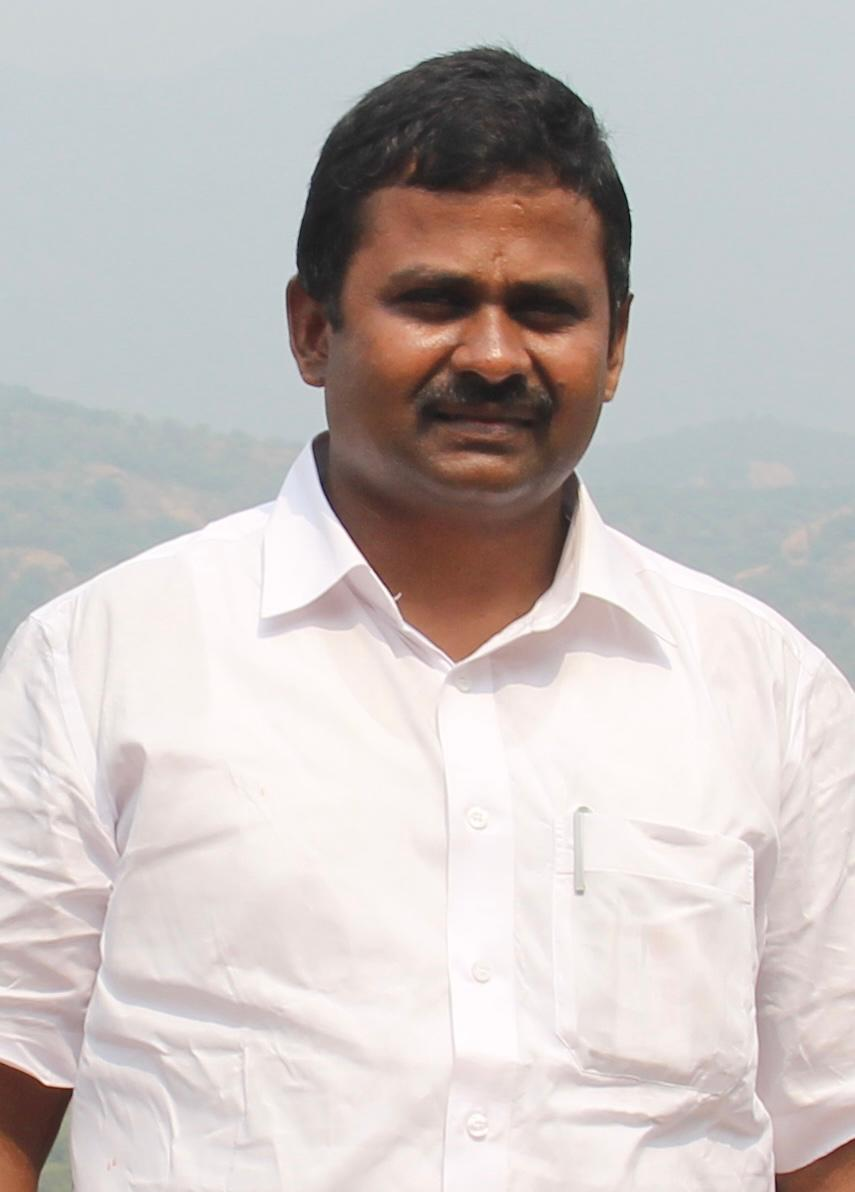
P. N. P. Inbasekaran

P. N. Periyannan Inbasekharan was elected to the Tamil Nadu Legislative Assembly from the Pennagaram constituency in the 2010 Bypoll and 2016 election. He was a candidate of the Dravida Munnetra Kazhagam (DMK) party. His father P. N. Periyannan died in 2009. His position was succeeded by P. N. P. Inbasekharan in 2010 Bypoll.

== Early life and education ==
PNP Inbasekaran was born on 5 July 1983 in Salai Kullathirampatti village, Pennagaram taluk, Dharmapuri district, Tamil Nadu.

He holds a Bachelor of Engineering (BE) degree from the University of Madras and a Master of Business Administration (MBA) degree from Annamalai University.

He is the son of P. N. Periannan, a former DMK legislator who represented the Pennagaram Assembly constituency.

== Electoral history ==
PNP Inbasekaran has contested elections from the Pennagaram Assembly constituency.

- In 2010, he won the Pennagaram Assembly by-election held following the demise of his father, P. N. Periannan.
- He lost the seat in the 2011 Tamil Nadu Legislative Assembly election.
- In the 2016 Tamil Nadu Legislative Assembly election, he won the Pennagaram seat as a DMK candidate, defeating Anbumani Ramadoss of the Pattali Makkal Katchi and K. P. Munusamy of the All India Anna Dravida Munnetra Kazhagam.
- He lost the election in 2021.
