= G. K. M. Tamil Kumaran =

Indian film producer

G.K.M, Tamil Kumaran
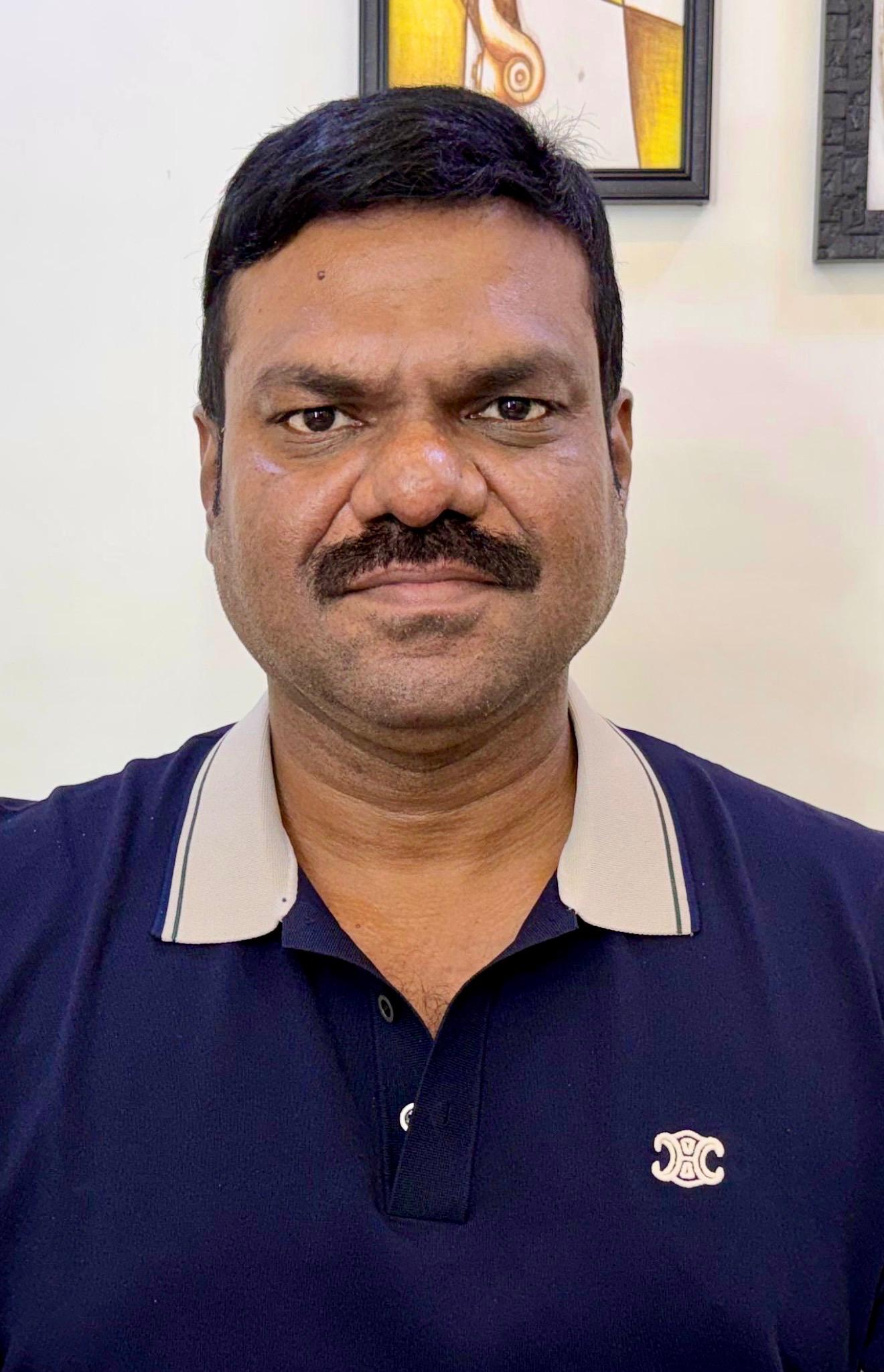
- Occupation: Producer
- Father: Govindapadi Kanthasami Mani

G.K.M Tamil Kumaran, is an Indian film producer who works in Tamil cinema.

== Personal life and career ==
Kumaran is the son of Govindapadi Kanthasami Mani, leader of the P.M.K political party in Tamil Nadu. He has produced the film Endrendrum Punnagai (2013). He is the production head of the production company Lyca Productions. He also contested in the 2010 by-elections in Pennagaram representing PMK but lost to P. N. P. Inbasekharan s/o late DMK MLA PN Periannan (also Ex PMK Member). He re-contested Pennagaram in the 2026 state elections as a Congress candidate.

== Filmography ==
Producer

- Endrendrum Punnagai (2013)
- Ayya (2025)
- Parimala and Co (2026)

Head of Production at Lyca Productions

- Don
- Ponniyin Selvan: I
- Pattathu Arasan
- Naai Sekar Returns
- Thiruvin Kural
- Ponniyin Selvan: II
- Theera Kaadhal
- Chandramukhi 2
- Mission: Chapter 1
- Lal Salaam
- Indian 2
- Vettaiyan
- Vidaamuyarchi
- Lockdown
- Sigma

Actor

- Naachiyaar (2018)
- Parimala and Co (2026)
