= Davy =

Davy may refer to:

- Davy (given name)
- Davy (surname)
- Davy lamp, a type of safety lamp with its flame encased inside a mesh screen
- Davy, West Virginia, United States, a town
- Davy Sound, Greenland
- Davy (crater), a crater on the Moon
- Davy (novel), a post-apocalyptic science fiction novel by Edgar Pangborn
- Davy (film), a 1957 British film produced by Basil Dearden
- Davy (album), a 2009 album by Coconut Records
- "Davy", a song by Janis Ian from the 1995 album Revenge
- Davy Stockbrokers, an Irish-based wealth manager

== See also ==
- Devi (disambiguation)
- Davey (disambiguation)
