= S. Hemalatha Devi =

Indian politician (born 1922)

Member of the Madras Legislative Assembly for Pennagaram
- In office 1957–1962
- Preceded by: S. Kandaswami Gounder
- Succeeded by: M. V. Karivengadam
- Majority: 3,255

Personal details
- Born: 10 September 1922
- Party: Indian National Congress

S. Hemalatha Devi (born 10 September 1922) is an Indian independence activist, social worker and former member of the Indian National Congress. She represented Pennagaram in the Madras Legislative Assembly (1957–62).

== Early life ==
Hemalatha Devi was born on 10 September 1922.

== Career ==
Hemalatha Devi was an active member of the Indian National Congress (INC) during its early phase. She was involved with the Indian independence movement and after India gained independence, she became a member of the Salem District Board in 1949. For seven years, she served as secretary of the Salem Indian Women's Association and was later elevated to the post of its Vice-President. She was also a member of the Standing Committee of All India Women's Conference's branch in Tamil Nadu.

Devi won the 1957 Madras Legislative Assembly election from Pennagaram as an official candidate of the INC. She defeated her nearest rival by a margin of 3,255 votes. However, she lost the following election to M. V. Karivengadam, a candidate from the Dravida Munnetra Kazhagam (DMK).

== Personal life ==
Hemalatha Devi is married with four children.
