= Devi, Mansehra =

Village in Pakistan

Coordinates: 34°20′30″N 73°1′40″E

Devi is a village in Mansehra District in the Khyber-Pakhtunkhwa province of Pakistan. It is located at 34°20'30N 73°1'40E with an altitude of 964 metres (3166 feet).
