= DAVI =

Research and demonstration initiative

The Dutch Automated Vehicle Initiative (DAVI) is a research and demonstration initiative developing automated vehicles for use on public roads.

The project is unique in that, besides simply making driverless cars, it also focuses on having automated vehicles share information among each other. The aim is to have the cars help avoid traffic congestion by reducing the safety distance between the cars (from 2 seconds to 0.5 seconds) and avoiding sudden traffic slow-downs due to maneuvers undertaken by drivers.
