= Davi (footballer, born 1944) =

Brazilian footballer

Personal information
- Full name: David Benedito Magalhães
- Date of birth: 14 June 1944 (age 82)
- Place of birth: Campinas, Brazil
- Height: 1.69 m (5 ft 7 in)
- Position: Right winger

Youth career
- Lapeaninho FC

Senior career*
Years	Team	Apps	(Gls)
1959–1962	XV de Jaú		
1961–1962	→ Noroeste (loan)		
1962	Ferroviária		
1963–1965	Corinthians	55	(9)
1965–1967	Internacional		
1967–1969	Cruzeiro	10	(3)
1969	Grêmio	18	(4)
1970–1971	Santos		
1972	Londrina		
1973–1974	Vitória		
1974–1976	Portuguesa Santista		
1976	Saad		

International career
1966	Brazil	2	(0)
- * Club domestic league appearances and goals as of 19 October 2024

David Benedito Magalhães (born 14 June 1944), better known as Davi, is a Brazilian former professional footballer who played as a right winger.

== Career ==
David (later Davi as he became known), began his career in amateur football in the city of São Paulo, playing for Lapeaninho FC in the Lapa neighborhood. As a professional, he had his first chances playing for teams from the countryside of state, with XV de Jaú in 1959, Noroeste and Ferroviária. After standing out in the 1962 Campeonato Paulista, he was sold for a sumptuous sum to SC Corinthians, where he played from 1963 to 1965, making 55 appearances and scoring 9 goals. Due to the pressure of the title drought at the Corinthians, he did not establish himself, heading to Rio Grande do Sul where he defended SC Internacional. Later Davi still defended Cruzeiro and Grêmio, until arriving at Santos in 1970.

Davi also played for Londrina, Vitória, Portuguesa Santista and Saad, before retiring in 1976.

== International career ==
Davi was part of the Campeonato Gaúcho players squad that represented the Brazil national team in the 1966 Copa Bernardo O'Higgins.

== Personal life ==
Davi gained notoriety for marrying Maria Lúcia Nascimento, Pelé's sister, whom he met during his time at Santos FC. After retiring, he worked at COSIPA in the city of Cubatão, and as a property administrator.

== Honours ==
Cruzeiro

- Campeonato Mineiro: 1968
