= Shilaidaha Kachharibari =

- Interactive map of the Shilaidaha Kachharibari area

General information
- Architectural style: Indo-European Architecture
- Location: Shilaidaha, Kumarkhali Upazila, Kushtia District, Bangladesh
- Coordinates: 23.9226°N 89.2247°E
- Opened: 1892; 134 years ago
- Renovated: May 2023; 3 years ago
- Owner: Department of Archaeology

Technical details
- Floor count: 2

Other information
- Number of rooms: 7

Shilaidaha Kachharibari (Bengali: শিলাইদহ কাছারি বাড়ি) is place where the Tagore family's zamindari activities were conducted. This Kachharibari was built in 1892. This kachari house is also known as Rabindra Kachharibari (Bengali: রবীন্দ্র কাছারি বাড়ি).

== History ==
The two-storied Kachharibari was built in 1892 on 9.918 acres (40,140 m^{2}) of land. The management of land rent was conducted from this Kachharibari. The Tagore family used Shilaidaha Rabindra Kuthibari for living, but Rabindranath Tagore managed the zamindari sitting in the Kuthibari. He did not go to Kachharibari without special reason.

Before Rabindranath Tagore's zamindari acquisition, there was a separate seating arrangement for Hindus and Muslims in the assembly of the people of the Kachharibari. Rabindranath Tagore abolished this practice. Apart from collecting the zamindari rent, fairs were held in the grounds of this building. Rabindranath Tagore used to visit this fair.

The building was under Kushtia District Administration. In 2020, the Kushtia District Administration handed over the building to the Department of Archaeology . The building was the land office of Shilaidah Union for several days. The building is currently abandoned due to its vulnerability. From May 2023, the Department of Archeology started the renovation of the building.

== Structure ==
The Kachari house has a pond and staff quarters. There is a pond on the east side, the horse stables were on the west bank of this pond. Some ruins of the stables are still visible. An iron gate was built at the entrance for security purposes but this too is no more.

The two storied building has 4 rooms on the ground floor and 3 rooms on the upper floor. Its architectural design is Indo-European but very simple. The building is 19.47 meters long and 9 meters wide in east–west direction.

== Bibliography ==
- কুষ্টিয়ার প্রত্ননিদর্শন [Archeology of Kushtia] (in Bengali) (1st ed.). Dhaka: Gatidhara. December 2022. pp. 109, 110. ISBN 978-984-8950-41-8.
