= Davie (disambiguation) =

Davie is a surname and masculine given name. It may also refer to:

== Places ==
- Davie, Florida, United States, a town
- Davie County, North Carolina, United States
- Davie Village and Davie Street, a neighbourhood and street in Vancouver, British Columbia, Canada

== Other uses ==
- Davie baronets, an extinct title in the Baronetage of England
- Davie Shipbuilding, a historic shipbuilding company in Quebec, Canada
- Davie School, Davie, Florida, on the National Register of Historic Places
