= William Gabriel Davy =

British Army officer (1780–1856)

General Sir William Gabriel Davy KCH CB
- Portrait of Davy by William Salter
- Born: 1780; Kingsholm, Gloucestershire
- Died: 25 January 1856 (aged 75–76) Tracy Park, Gloucestershire
- Buried: Gloucester Cathedral
- Allegiance: Kingdom of Great Britain (1797–1801); United Kingdom
- Branch: British Army
- Service years: 1797–1856
- Rank: General
- Conflicts: Peninsular War: Battle of Roleia; Battle of Vimiera; Battle of Talavera
- Awards: Field Officer's Gold Medal; Companion of the Order of the Bath; Knight Commander of the Royal Guelphic Order

General Sir William Gabriel Davy KCH CB (1780 – 25 January 1856) was a British Army officer who fought in the Peninsular War.

== Life ==
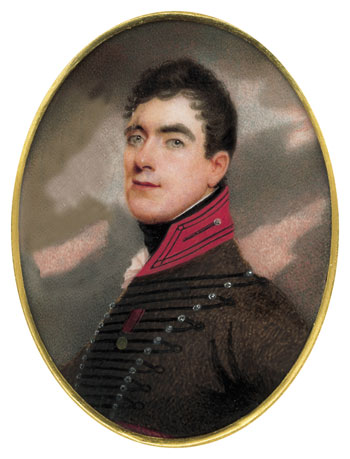
A miniature of Davy as a young man, painted sometime before 1820

William Gabriel Davy was born in 1780 in Kingsholm, Gloucestershire. He was the eldest son of Harriet Preston and Major William Davy, Persian Secretary to Warren Hastings, the first Governor-General of Bengal. Educated at Eton College, Davy became a lieutenant in the 61st Foot of the British Army in 1797. He transferred to the 5th battalion of the 60th Foot at the beginning of 1802, and was made a captain. He was promoted to major and lieutenant colonel on 5 February 1807 and 28 December 1809, respectively. In 1808, he succeeded Francis de Rottenburg as the commander of the 5th battalion.

The battalion departed from Cork on 12 July 1808. On 1 August, they arrived at Mondego Bay in Portugal, where the first British troops to participate in the Peninsular War landed; Davy's battalion was the first to land. The Battle of Roleia was especially difficult, as his battalion was in the middle of the fighting. At one point, the troops ascended a mountain "so covered with brushwood that [their] legs were ready to sink under [them]." In December 1809, just after being promoted to lieutenant-colonel, he moved to the 7th Garrison Battalion. However, he never participated in physical combat again. Davy was promoted to the rank of colonel on 12 August 1819, major general on 22 July 1830, and lieutenant general on 23 November 1841. In 1820, he purchased the Tracy Park estate from Robert Bush for £12,818 (equivalent to £1,025,087 in 2023).

He remarried in 1840, to Sophia Fountayne Wilson, daughter of Richard Fountayne Wilson of Melton, Yorkshire. The sister of the new Lady Davy was married to Major-General Sir Richard England. Davy was promoted to lieutenant-general in November the following year. In November 1842, Davy became the colonel commandant of the 60th Foot, a position he held till 1856, and shared with Patrick Stuart in 1843. One of Davy's junior officers in the unit was lieutenant-colonel (later general) Henry Dundas, 3rd Viscount Melville. Davy was promoted to general in 1854. Ever since his purchase of the property in 1820, he resided at Tracy Park, Gloucestershire. He died there on 25 January 1856, aged 77. He was buried at his family vault in Gloucester Cathedral. Davy had only one son, The Reverend Charles Raikes Davy, the rector of Adel, Leeds, who had four children. As he gave his son the middle name Raikes, an historian postulates he had ancestry from the Raikes clan.

== Honours ==
Davy was awarded the Field Officer's Gold Medal, a clasp, and a gold ribbon buckle for his service in the battles of Roleia, Vimiera and Talavera during the Peninsular War. He was also praised by distinguished figures, such as Secretary of State Lord Castlereagh. Davy became a Companion of the Bath on 4 June 1815. King William IV knighted Davy and made him a Knight Commander of the Royal Guelphic Order at St James's Palace on 23 March 1836.

== Sources ==
- Vaudrey, David (September 2006). "The Davy Hatchment In Holy Trinity Church, Doynton" (PDF). Doynton Village (2nd ed.).
