= Pramatha Chaudhuri =

Bengali writer (1868–1946)

Birbal Pramathanath Chaudhuri
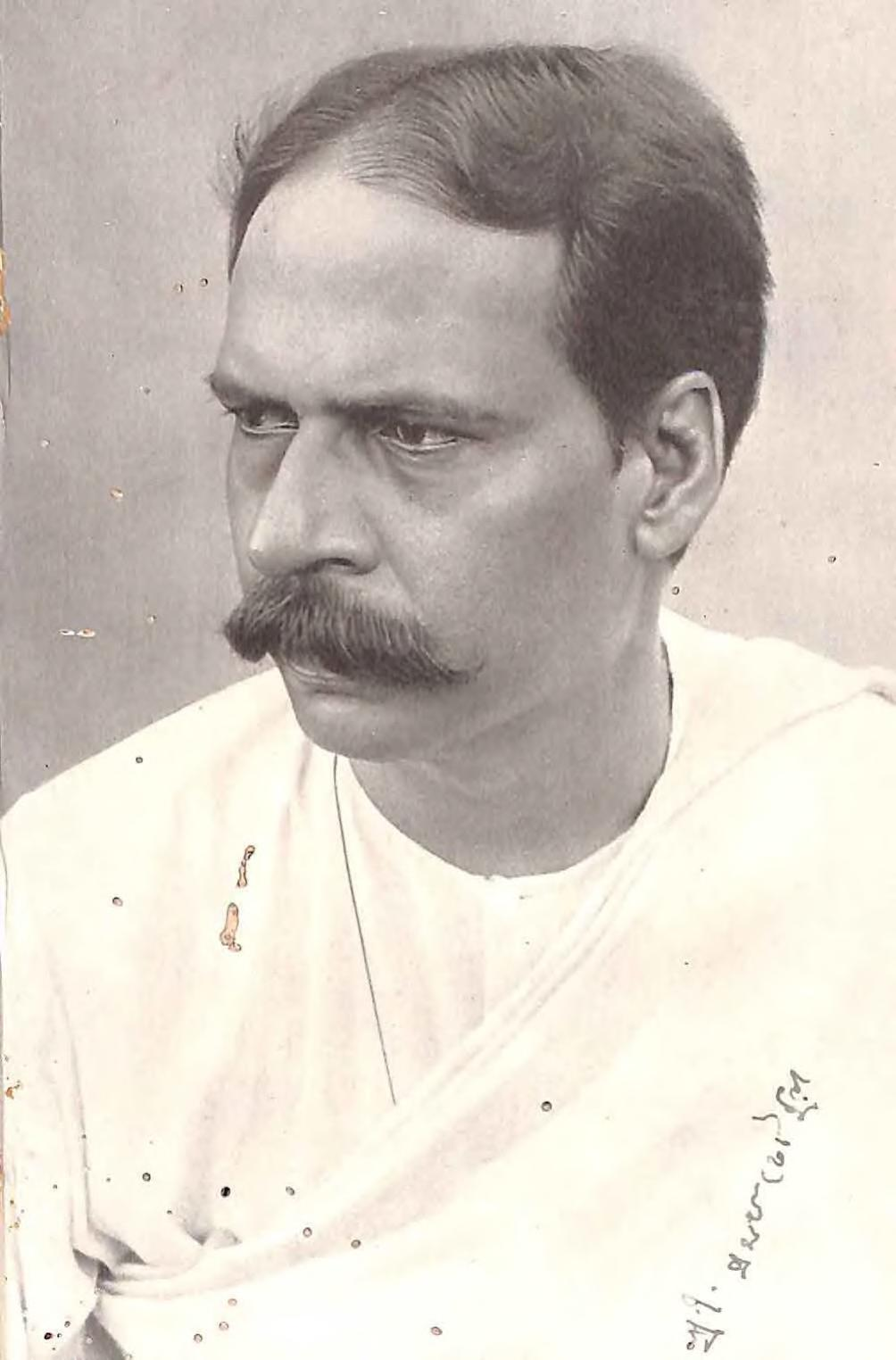
- Born: 7 August 1868; Jashore, Bengal, British India
- Died: 2 September 1946 (aged 78); Calcutta, Bengal, British India
- Education: Presidency College, Kolkata; St. Xavier's College, Kolkata
- Occupation: ·Poet ·Essayist ·Writer
- Notable work: Char-Yari Katha, Ahuti, Nil-Lohit, contributions to Sabujpatra magazine among several other writings
- Movement: Bengal Renaissance
- Spouse: Indira Devi Chaudhurani
- Relatives: Prasannamoyee Devi (sister); Priyamvada Devi (niece)

Pramathanath Chaudhuri (7 August 1868 – 2 September 1946), known as Pramatha Chaudhuri, alias Birbal, was a Bengali essayist, poet, and writer. He was the nephew of Rabindranath Tagore as his mother was Sukumari Debi, the second sister of Tagore. He married musician and writer Indira Devi Chaudhurani, daughter of Satyendranath Tagore, the first Indian to have joined the Indian Civil Services and an author, composer and feminist, who was the second eldest brother of Rabindranath Tagore.

== Biography ==
=== Life at Krishnanagar ===
He studied in Krishnanagar Debnath High School in Krishnanagar. From his 5th to 13th year, Chaudhuri lived at Krishnanagar, Nadia.

=== Youth ===
Chaudhuri joined the Presidency College, Kolkata for the First Arts course. But he had to shift to Krishnagar again as there was an outbreak of dengue fever in Kolkata and joined the sophomore year Arts class at Krishnagar College. He suspended his studies again and moved to his father in Dinajpur owing to persistent fever. Returning to Kolkata in 1887, he passed the Arts examination from St. Xavier's College, Calcutta with second division marks.

=== Works ===
After qualifying law, Chaudhuri joined the law firm of Ashutosh Dhar, a solicitor, as an article clerk. Chaudhuri sailed for England in 1893 and returned three years after as a Barrister-at-Law, having been called to the bar at the Inner Temple. Meanwhile, between, 1890 and 1893, two of his original essays and two stories, Phuldani (The Flower Vase) and Torquato Tasso, were published. Khayal Khata (A Scrap Book) was the first piece that appeared under the pen name Birbal in a Bengali journal Bharati in 1902. He wrote Ek Tukro Smritikatha (A Handful of Reminiscence), in 1908.

== Sabuj Patra ==
=== Appearance ===
Sabuj Patra (Bengali: সবুজ পত্র, "Green Leaf"), a liberal and pro-Tagore Bengali magazine he, made its debut in April, 1914. In the first issue Chaudhuri explained the magazine's title:

The new leaf is green, a wonderful amalgam of aesthetic and spiritual beauty... The green dynamic mind works a wonderful synthesis between the finite and the infinite, the east and the west

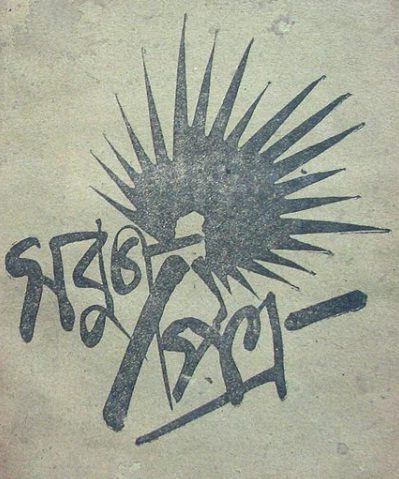
Cover of the first issue of Sabuj Patra.

== Bibliography ==
=== Non-fiction prose ===
1. Tel Nun Lakri, 1906 – Collection of Socio-political Essays
2. Birbaler Halkhata, 1917 – Collection of Essays
3. Nana Katha, 1919 – Collection of Essays
4. Aamaader Shiksha, 1920 – Collection of Essays
5. Du-Yarki, 1920 – Collection of Political Essays
6. Birbaler Tippani, 1921 – Collection of Short Essays
7. Rayater Katha, 1926 – Rayater Katha and other Essays
8. Nana Charcha, 1932 – Collection of Essays
9. Ghare Baire, 1936 – Collection of Essays
10. Prachin Hindusthan, 1940 – Collection of Essays
11. Banga-Sahityer Sanskhipta Parichaya, 1944 – Girish Ghosh Lecture, delivered at the instance of the University of Calcutta
12. Hindu-Sangeet, 1945 – Collection of Short Notes on Music
13. Atma-Katha, 1946 – Autobiography
14. Prabandha Sangraha, Vol.I, 1952 – Collection of Selected Essays
15. Prachin Bangla Sahitye Hindu-Musalman, 1953 – A Treatise
16. Prabandha Sangraha, Vol.II, 1952 – Collection of Selected Essays

=== Poetry ===
1. Sonnet Panchasat, 1913 – Collection of 50 Sonnets
2. Padacharan, 1919 – Collection of Poems
3. Sonnet Panchasat and Anyanya Kabita, 1961 – Collection of all Sonnets and Poems

=== Fiction ===
1. Char-Yari Katha, (Tales of Four Friends), 1916 – Story
2. Ahuti, 1919 – Collection of Short Stories
3. Nil-Lohit, 1932 – Collection of Stories
4. Nil-Lohiter Adi-Prem, 1934 – Collection of Stories
5. Ghoshaler Tri-Katha, 1937 – Collection of Stories
6. Anukatha-Saptak, 1939 – Collection of Short Stories
7. Galpa-Sangraha, 1941 – Collection of Stories
8. Galpa-Sangraha, 1968 – Collection of Stories (Revised Enlarged Edition)

=== Collected works ===
1. Pramatha Chaudhuri Granthabali, 1926 – Collection of Prose and Poetical Works
