= 2004 Indian general election in Tamil Nadu =

Indian general election in Tamil Nadu, 2004
- 10 May 2004

39 seats
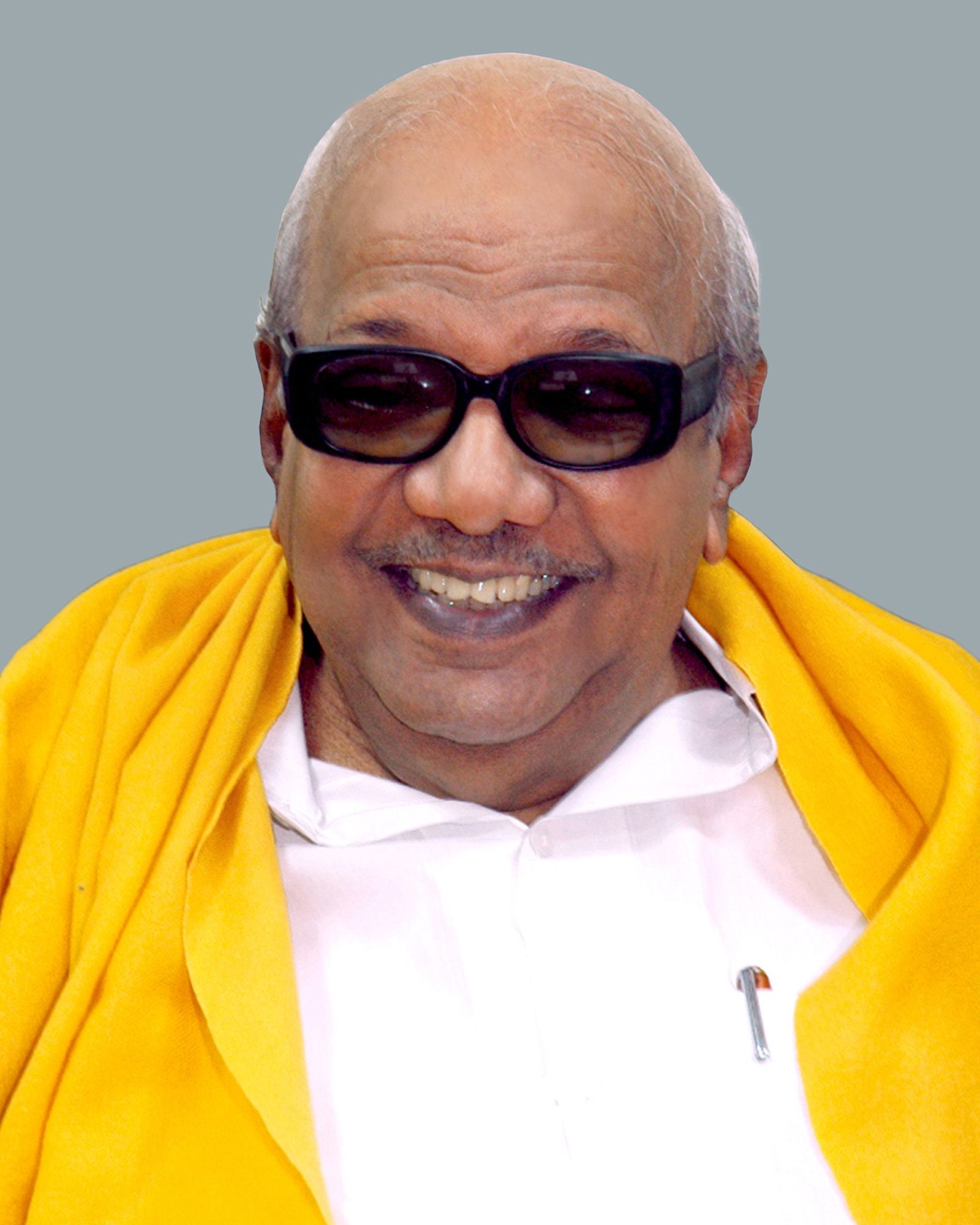

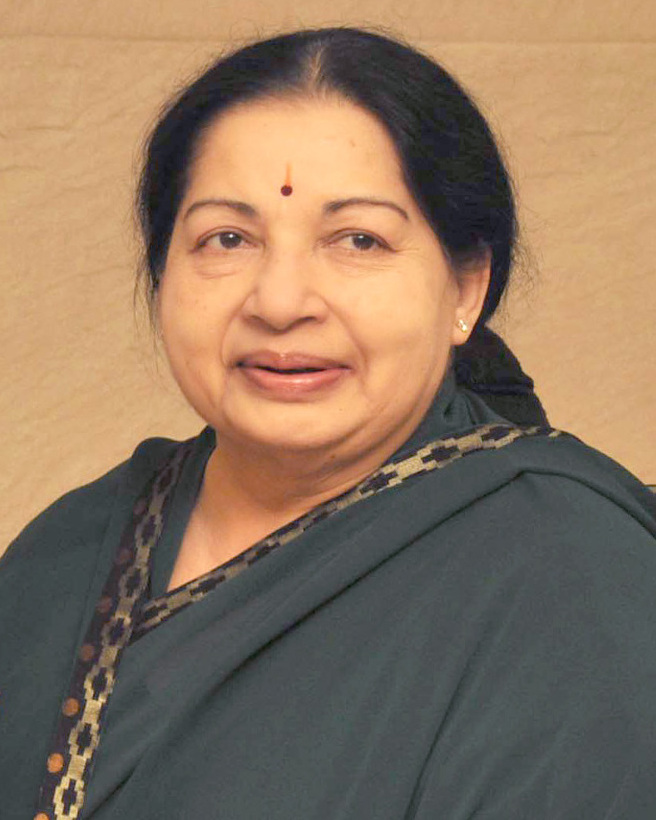
	First party	Second party
Leader	M. Karunanidhi	J. Jayalalithaa
Party	DMK	AIADMK
Alliance	INC+ (post poll UPA)+DPA+LF	NDA
Seats won	39	0
Seat change	▲12	▼14
Popular vote	1,64,83,390	1,00,02,913
Percentage	57.40%	34.84%
Swing	▲15.73%	▼11.57%
Prime Minister before election
Atal Bihari Vajpayee
BJP
Prime Minister after election
Manmohan Singh
INC

The 2004 Indian general election polls in Tamil Nadu were held for 39 seats in the state. The result was a victory for the Democratic Progressive Alliance, which included the United Progressive Alliance (UPA) and its allies the Left Front which won all 39 seats in the state. DMK and its allies were also able to hold on to Pondicherry, which has 1 seat, which allowed the UPA to win all 40 seats in Tamil Nadu and Pondicherry. The 2 larger partners Dravida Munnetra Kazhagam (DMK) (16) and Indian National Congress (INC) (10) won the majority of seats, with the junior partners Pattali Makkal Katchi (PMK) (5) and Marumaralarchi Dravida Munnetra Kazhagam (MDMK) (4) winning the rest. The remaining 4 seats were won by the Left Front parties. Due to the support of the Left Front for the government at the centre, all 39 seats in Tamil Nadu, supported the formation of the UPA-led government.

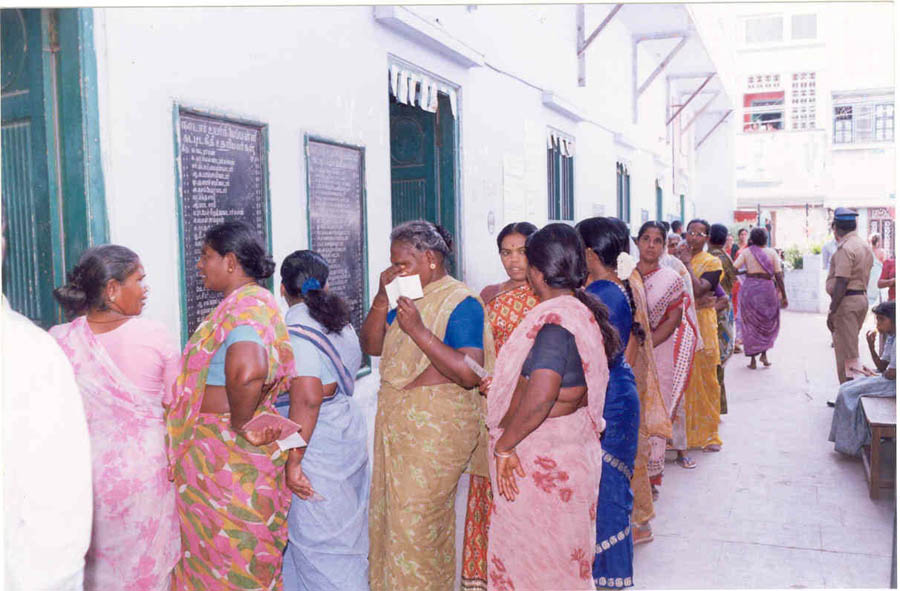
Long queue of female voters at a polling booth in Madurai of Tamil Nadu on May 10, 2004

The DPA was formed, because DMK, PMK and MDMK, left the NDA mostly on the Ayodhya issue and created an alliance that supported the UPA. The NDA paid a price for it, when their BJP-AIADMK alliance could not even win a seat in this state.

== Schedule ==
Event	Date
Date for Nominations	16 April 2004
Last Date for filing Nominations	23 April 2004
Date for scrutiny of nominations	24 April 2004
Last date for withdrawal of candidatures	26 April 2004
Date of poll	10 May 2004
Date of counting	13 May 2004

== Seat allotments ==
=== Democratic Progressive Alliance ===
Democratic Progressive Alliance
Party	Flag	Symbol	Leader	Seats
Dravida Munnetra Kazhagam			M. Karunanidhi	15
Indian Union Muslim League			K. M. Kader Mohideen	1
Indian National Congress			G. K. Vasan	9
Congress Jananayaka Peravai			P. Chidambaram	1
Pattali Makkal Katchi			S. Ramadoss	5
Marumalarchi Dravida Munnetra Kazhagam			Vaiko	4
Communist Party of India			R. Nallakannu	2
Communist Party of India (Marxist)			N. Varadarajan	2
Total				39

=== National Democratic Alliance ===
National Democratic Alliance
Party	Flag	Symbol	Leader	Seats
All India Anna Dravida Munnetra Kazhagam			J. Jayalalithaa	33
Bharatiya Janata Party			C. P. Radhakrishnan	6
Total				39

=== People's alliance ===
Party	Flag	Symbol	Leader	Seats contested	
Viduthalai Chiruthaigal Katchi			Thol. Thirumavalavan	8	25
Makkal Tamil Desam Katchi			R. S. Raja Kannappan	5	25
Puthiya Tamilagam			K. Krishnasamy	5	25
Janata Dal (United)			George Fernandes	3	25
Indian National League			Janab	3	25
Puratchi Council				1	25

=== Fourth front ===
Party	Flag	Election symbol	Leader	Seats contested	
Janata Party			Subramanian Swamy	21	31
Puthiya Needhi Katchi			A. C. Shanmugam	10	31

Note: The janata party and puthiya Needhi Katchi contested in janata party's symbol

== List of Candidates ==
Constituency		UPA		NDA	
#	Name	Party	Candidate	Party	Candidate
1	Chennai North	DMK	C. Kuppusami	BJP	M. N. Sukumaran Nambiyar
2	Chennai Central	DMK	Dayanidhi Maran	ADMK	N. Balaganga
3	Chennai South	DMK	T. R. Baalu	ADMK	Bader Sayeed
4	Sriperumbudur	DMK	A. Krishnaswamy	ADMK	P. Venugopal
5	Chengalpattu	PMK	A. K. Moorthy	ADMK	K. N. Ramachandran
6	Arakkonam	PMK	R. Velu	ADMK	N. Shanmugham
7	Vellore	DMK	K. M. Kader Mohideen (Note: Indian Union Muslim League candidate contested on the "Rising Sun" symbol of the Dravida Munnetra Kazhagam (DMK), and is officially recorded as a DMK candidate in electoral records.)	ADMK	A. Santhanam
8	Tiruppattur	DMK	D. Venugopal	ADMK	K. G. Subramani
9	Vandavasi	MDMK	N. Ramachandran Gingee	ADMK	R. Rajalakshmi
10	Tindivanam	PMK	K. Dhanaraju	ADMK	A. Arunmozhithevan
11	Cuddalore	DMK	K. Venkatapathy	ADMK	R. Rajendran
12	Chidambaram	PMK	E. Ponnuswamy	BJP	Tada N. Periyasamy
13	Dharmapuri	PMK	R. Senthil	BJP	P. D. Elangovan
14	Krishnagiri	DMK	E. G. Sugavanam	ADMK	K. Nanju Gowda
15	Rasipuram	INC	K. Rani	ADMK	S. Anbalagan
16	Salem	INC	K. V. Thangabalu	ADMK	A. Rajshekharan
17	Tiruchengode	DMK	K. Subbulakshmi Jagadisan	ADMK	Edappadi K. Palanisamy
18	Nilgiris	INC	R. Prabhu	BJP	Master Mathan
19	Gobichettipalayam	INC	E. V. K. S. Elangovan	ADMK	N. R. Govindarajar
20	Coimbatore	CPI	K. Subbarayan	BJP	C. P. Radhakrishnan
21	Pollachi	MDMK	C. Krishnan	ADMK	G. Murugan
22	Palani	INC	S. K. Kharvendhan	ADMK	K. Kishore Kumar
23	Dindigul	INC	N. S. V. Chitthan	ADMK	M. Jeyaraman
24	Madurai	CPI(M)	P. Mohan	ADMK	A. K. Bose
25	Periyakulam	INC	J. M. Aaron Rasheed	ADMK	T. T. V. Dhinakaran
26	Karur	DMK	K. C. Palanisamy	ADMK	N. Palanisamy Raja
27	Tiruchirappalli	MDMK	L. Ganesan	ADMK	M. Paranjothi
28	Perambalur	DMK	A. Raja	ADMK	M. Sundaram
29	Mayiladuthurai	INC	Mani Shankar Aiyar	ADMK	O. S. Manian
30	Nagapattinam	DMK	A. K. S. Vijayan	ADMK	P. J. Arjunan
31	Thanjavur	DMK	S. S. Palanimanickam	ADMK	K. Thangamuthu
32	Pudukkottai	DMK	S. Regupathy	ADMK	A. Ravichandran
33	Sivaganga	INC	P. Chidambaram (Note: Congress Jananayaka Peravai candidate contested on the "Hand" symbol of the Indian National Congress, and is officially recorded as a INC candidate in electoral records.)	ADMK	S. P. Karuppaih
34	Ramanathapuram	DMK	M. S. K. Bhavani Rajendran	ADMK	C. Murugesan
35	Sivakasi	MDMK	A. Ravichandran	ADMK	P. Kannan
36	Tirunelveli	INC	R. Dhanushkodi Aadhithan	ADMK	R. Amirtha Ganesan
37	Tenkasi	CPI	M. Appadurai	ADMK	S. Murugesan
38	Tiruchendur	DMK	Radhika Selvi	ADMK	T. Dhamodharan
39	Nagercoil	CPI(M)	A. V. Bellarmin	BJP	Pon Radhakrishnan

== Opinion Polls ==
Polling agency	Date published				Lead	Ref.
Polling agency	Date published	DPA	NDA	Others	Lead	Ref.
Indian Express-NDTV-AC Nielsen	April 2004	34	5		DMK	

== Voting and results ==
=== Results by Pre-Poll Alliance ===
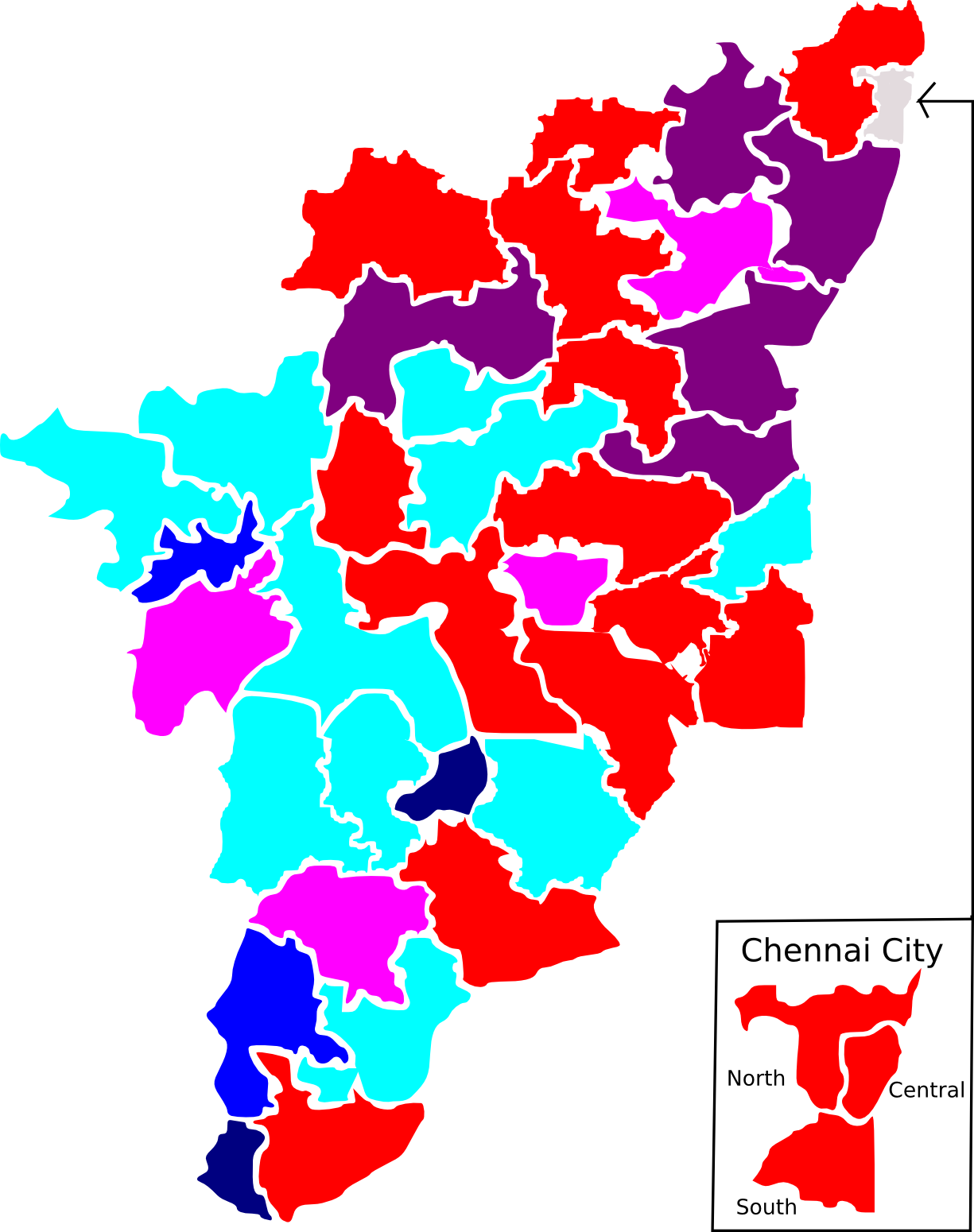
Election map of results based on parties. Colours are based on the results table on the left

Alliance	Party	Popular Vote	Percentage	Swing	Seats won	Seat Change
United Progressive Alliance	Dravida Munnetra Kazhagam	7,064,393	24.60%	▲1.47%	16	▲4
United Progressive Alliance	Indian National Congress	4,134,255	14.40%	▲3.30%	10	▲8
United Progressive Alliance	Pattali Makkal Katchi	1,927,367	6.71%	▼1.50%	5	Steady
United Progressive Alliance	Marumalarchi Dravida Munnetra Kazhagam	1,679,870	5.95%	▼0.10%	4	Steady
United Progressive Alliance	Communist Party of India	852,981	2.97%	▲0.41%	2	▲2
United Progressive Alliance	Communist Party of India (Marxist)	824,524	2.87%	▲0.52%	2	▲1
United Progressive Alliance	Total	16,483,390	57.50%	▲4.10%	39	▲15
National Democratic Alliance	All India Anna Dravida Munnetra Kazhagam	8,547,014	29.77%	▲3.05%	0	▼10
National Democratic Alliance	Bharatiya Janata Party	1,455,899	5.07%	▼2.07%	0	▼4
National Democratic Alliance	Total	10,002,913	34.84%	▲0.98%	0	▼14
Independents		947,938	3.30%	▲2.05%	0	Steady
Other Parties (13 parties)		2,228,212	4.36%	▼7.13%	0	▼1
Total		28,714,515	100.00%	Steady	39	Steady
Valid Votes		28,714,515	99.94%			
Invalid Votes		18,439	0.06%			
Total Votes		28,732,954	100.00%			
Registered Voters/Turnout		47,252,271	60.81%	▲2.83%		

†: Seat change represents seats won in terms of the current alliances, which is considerably different from the last election. Also the seat change for BJP, includes the merged party MADMK, who won 1 seat in the last election.
‡: Vote % reflects the percentage of votes the party received compared to the entire electorate that voted in this election. Adjusted (Adj.) Vote %, reflects the % of votes the party received per constituency that they contested.
Sources: Election Commission of India

=== 1999 vs. 2004 Alliance ===
Coalition/Alliance	Parties contesting in Tamil Nadu from the Alliance in 1999	Seats won in 1999 Election	Parties contesting in Tamil Nadu from the Alliance in 2004	Seats won in 2004 Election	Swing
National Democratic Alliance	-Bharatiya Janata Party (4) -Dravida Munnetra Kazhagam (12) -Marumaralarchi Dravida Munnetra Kazhagam (4) -Pattali Makkal Katchi (5) -MGR Anna Dravida Munnetra Kazhagam (1)	26	-Bharatiya Janata Party -All India Anna Dravida Munnetra Kazhagam	0	−26
United Progressive Alliance*	Indian National Congress (2); All India Anna Dravida Munnetra Kazhagam (10)	12	-Indian National Congress (10) -Dravida Munnetra Kazhagam (16) -Marumaralarchi Dravida Munnetra Kazhagam (4) -Pattali Makkal Katchi (5)	35	+23
Left Front	Communist Party of India; Communist Party of India (Marxist) (1)	1	Communist Party of India (2); Communist Party of India (Marxist) (2)	4	+3

- Note: UPA was not in existence in 1999, instead the number of seats won in 1999, represents the seats won by Indian National Congress and its allies.
- Note: INC affiliated parties, are parties that did not form an alliance or coalition with Congress party, but instead gave outside support.
- Note: Left front, whose parties were allies of DMK in Tamil Nadu, was not part of the UPA, in 2004, instead gave outside support.

== List of Elected MPs ==
Constituency		Winner				Runner Up				Margin	%
#	Name	Candidate	Party	Votes	%	Candidate	Party	Votes	%	Margin	%
1	Madras North	C. Kuppusami	DMK	570,122	62.25	Sukumar Nambiar	BJP	316,583	34.57	253,539	27.68
2	Madras Central	Dayanidhi Maran	DMK	316,329	61.68	N. Balaganga	ADMK	182,151	35.52	134,178	26.16
3	Madras South	T. R. Baalu	DMK	564,578	60.41	F. Bader Sayeed	ADMK	343,838	36.79	220,740	23.62
4	Sriperumbudur (SC)	A. Krishnaswamy	DMK	517,617	61.39	Dr. P. Venugopal	ADMK	282,271	33.48	235,346	27.91
5	Chengalpattu	A. K. Moorthy	PMK	431,643	56.86	K. N. Ramachandran	ADMK	282,919	37.27	148,724	19.59
6	Arakkonam	R. Velu	PMK	386,911	49.90	N. Shanmugam	ADMK	284,715	36.72	102,196	13.18
7	Vellore	K. M. Kader Mohideen	DMK	436,642	58.46	A. Santhanam	ADMK	258,032	34.55	178,610	23.91
8	Tiruppattur	D. Venugopal	DMK	453,786	58.47	K. G. Subramani	ADMK	272,884	35.16	180,902	23.31
9	Vandavasi	N. Ramachandran	MDMK	394,903	56.15	R. Rajalakshmi	ADMK	243,470	34.62	151,433	21.53
10	Tindivanam	K. Dhanaraju	PMK	367,849	50.60	A. Arunmozhithevan	ADMK	276,685	38.06	91,164	12.54
11	Cuddalore	K. Venkatapathy	DMK	400,059	52.63	R. Rajendran	ADMK	268,707	35.35	131,352	17.28
12	Chidambaram (SC)	E. Ponnuswamy	PMK	343,424	46.20	Thol. Thirumavalavan	JD(U)	255,773	34.41	87,651	11.79
13	Dharmapuri	R. Senthil	PMK	397,540	55.99	P. D. Elangovan	BJP	181,450	25.56	216,090	30.44
14	Krishnagiri	E. G. Sugavanam	DMK	403,297	54.59	K. Nanje Gowdu	ADMK	284,075	38.45	119,222	16.14
15	Rasipuram (SC)	K. Rani	INC	384,170	55.20	S. Anbalagan	ADMK	249,637	35.87	134,533	19.33
16	Salem	K. V. Thangkabalu	INC	444,591	59.96	A. Rajasekaran	ADMK	268,964	36.28	175,627	23.69
17	Tiruchengode	Subbulakshmi J.	DMK	501,569	58.02	K. Palaniswami	ADMK	322,172	37.27	179,397	20.75
18	Nilgiris	R. Prabhu	INC	494,121	63.28	Master Mathan	BJP	257,619	32.99	236,502	30.29
19	Gobichettipalayam	E. V. K. S. Elangovan	INC	426,826	62.76	N. R. Govindarajar	ADMK	212,349	31.22	214,477	31.54
20	Coimbatore	K. Subbarayan	CPI	504,981	57.46	C. P. Radhakrishnan	BJP	340,476	38.74	164,505	18.72
21	Pollachi (SC)	C. Krishnan	MDMK	364,988	56.76	G. Murugan	ADMK	244,067	37.96	120,921	18.81
22	Palani	S. K. Kharventhan	INC	448,900	64.55	K. Kishore Kumar	ADMK	217,407	31.26	231,493	33.29
23	Dindigul	N. S. V. Chitthan	INC	407,116	58.98	M. Jeyaraman	ADMK	251,945	36.50	155,171	22.48
24	Madurai	P. Mohan	CPI(M)	414,433	56.03	A. K. Bose	ADMK	281,593	38.07	132,840	17.96
25	Periyakulam	J. M. Aaron Rashid	INC	346,851	49.51	T. T. V. Dhinakaran	ADMK	325,696	46.49	21,155	3.02
26	Karur	K. C. Palanisamy	DMK	450,407	60.57	N. Raja Palanichamy	ADMK	259,531	34.90	190,876	25.67
27	Tiruchirappalli	L. Ganesan	MDMK	450,907	63.68	M. Paranjothi	ADMK	234,182	33.07	216,725	30.60
28	Perambalur (SC)	A. Raja	DMK	389,708	55.12	Dr. M. Sundaram	ADMK	236,375	33.43	153,333	21.69
29	Mayiladuthurai	Mani Shankar Aiyar	INC	411,160	59.11	O. S. Manian	ADMK	215,469	30.97	195,691	28.13
30	Nagapattinam (SC)	A. K. S. Vijayan	DMK	463,389	61.67	P J. Archunan	ADMK	247,166	32.89	216,223	28.77
31	Thanjavur	S. S. Palanimanickam	DMK	400,986	56.58	K. Thangamuthu	ADMK	281,838	39.77	119,148	16.81
32	Pudukkottai	S. Regupathy	DMK	466,133	56.83	A. Ravichandran	ADMK	309,637	37.75	156,496	19.08
33	Sivaganga	P. Chidambaram	INC	400,393	60.01	S P. Karuppiah	ADMK	237,668	35.62	162,725	24.39
34	Ramanathapuram	Bhavani Rajenthiran	DMK	335,287	49.72	C. Murugesan	ADMK	225,337	33.41	109,950	16.30
35	Sivakasi	A. Ravichandran	MDMK	469,072	56.47	P. Kannan	ADMK	304,555	36.66	164,517	19.81
36	Tirunelveli	R. Dhanuskodi Athithan	INC	370,127	58.40	R. Amirtha Ganesan	ADMK	203,052	32.04	167,075	26.36
37	Tenkasi (SC)	M. Appadurai	CPI	348,000	48.87	S. Murugesan	ADMK	225,824	31.71	122,176	17.16
38	Tiruchendur	V. Radhika Selvi	DMK	394,484	62.52	T. Thamodaran	ADMK	212,803	33.72	181,681	28.79
39	Nagercoil	A. V. Bellarmin	CPI(M)	410,091	60.88	Pon Radhakrishnan	BJP	245,797	36.49	164,294	24.39

== Post Election Analysis ==
Source: NES Election 2004 Analysis

Voting Pattern in Tamil NaduKarunanidhi rated better than Jayalalithaa
Category	DMK+	AIADMK+	Others
Gender
Male	54%	32%	14%
Female	49%	39%	12%
Locality
Rural	50%	35%	15%
Urban	57%	36%	7%
Social class
Very poor	44%	37%	17%
Poor	55%	31%	14%
Lower middle	57%	37%	6%
Middle	51%	39%	10%
Caste
Upper caste	33%	54%	13%
Thevar	50%	47%	3%
Vanniyars	61%	33%	6%
Chettiyars	47%	30%	23%
Gounders	57%	33%	10%
Nadars	57%	36%	7%
Lower OBCs	55%	33%	12%
Chekkliyars, Pallars, etc.	39%	38%	23%
other Dalits	40%	37%	23%
Muslims	78%	11%	11%
Tell me how good each of the leaders are for Tamil Nadu...
Rating	J. Jayalalithaa	M. Karunanidhi	
Bad	51%	2%	
Average	31%	33%	
Good	11%	39%	
Very good	3%	23%	
Do not know	4%	3%	

== Post-election Union Council of Ministers from Tamil Nadu ==
Source: The Hindu
After the UPA victory in this election, Tamil Nadu was rewarded with 12 berths in Union Council of Ministers, with 6 cabinet berths, which is the most this state has ever received after an election. 7 of the Ministers were from DMK, 2 from PMK, while the rest were from Congress.

=== Cabinet Ministers ===
Minister	Party	Lok Sabha Constituency/Rajya Sabha	Portfolios
P. Chidambaram	INC	Sivaganga	Minister of Finance
Mani Shankar Aiyar	INC	Mayiladuthurai	Minister of Panchayati Raj and Minister of Development of North Eastern Region
T. R. Baalu	DMK	Chennai South	Minister of Shipping, Road Transport and Highways
A. Raja	DMK	Perambalur (SC)	Minister of Environment and Forests
Dayanidhi Maran	DMK	Chennai Central	Minister of Communications and Information Technology
Anbumani Ramadoss	PMK	Rajya Sabha	Minister of Health and Family Welfare

=== Ministers of State ===
Minister	Party	Lok Sabha Constituency/Rajya Sabha	Portfolios
S. S. Palanimanickam	DMK	Thanjavur	Minister of Finance
S. Regupathy	DMK	Pudukkottai	Minister of Environment and Forests
K. Venkatapathy	DMK	Cuddalore	Minister of Law and Justice
Subbulakshmi Jagadeesan	DMK	Tiruchengode	Minister of Social Justice and Empowerment
E. V. K. S. Elangovan	INC	Gobichettipalayam	Minister of Commerce and Industry
R. Velu	PMK	Arakkonam	Minister of Railways

== Assembly Segment wise lead ==
Party	Assembly segments	Position in Assembly (as of 2006 election)
Dravida Munnetra Kazhagam	96	96
Indian National Congress	59	34
Pattali Makkal Katchi	29	18
Marumalarchi Dravida Munnetra Kazhagam	24	6
Communist Party of India (Marxist)	12	9
Communist Party of India	12	6
All India Anna Dravida Munnetra Kazhagam	1	61
Janata Dal (United)	1	0
Others	0	4
Total	234	

== See also ==
- Elections in Tamil Nadu
