= R. Thamaraiselvan =

Indian politician

Member of Parliament, Lok Sabha
- In office 16 May 2009 – 16 May 2014
- Preceded by: R. Senthil
- Succeeded by: Anbumani Ramadoss
- Constituency: Dharmapuri

Personal details
- Born: May 26, 1963 (age 62) Dharmapuri, Tamil Nadu, India
- Party: Dravida Munnetra Kazhagam

R. Thamaraiselvan (born 26 May 1963) is a former Indian politician and ex-member of the Parliament of India, where he represented Dharmapuri Constituency in Tamil Nadu from 2009 to 2014. He represents the Dravida Munnetra Kazhagam party. He was a successful Senior Advocate from Madras High Court and represents various cases in Apex Courts. He was born to Shri L.P. Ramar and Smt. Pachiammal and is married to Smt.Geetha, who has been a practicing Advocate from Madras High Court for more than two decades. Though he hails from a traditional DMK family tracing back from the Justice Party, he was an acclaimed Counsel on Record and a full time politician of the DMK party.
