= Kuppur =

- Village panchayat
- Country: India
- State: Tamil Nadu
- Region: Kongu Nadu
- District: Dharmapuri
- Block: Dharmapuri
- Panchayat: Kuppur

Government
  - Type: Village Panchayat

Population (2011)
  - Total: 5,483

Languages
  - Official: Tamil
- Time zone: UTC+5:30 (IST)
- PIN: 636704
- Telephone code: 91-4346
- Vehicle registration: TN 29
- Lok Sabha Constituency: Dharmapuri Lok Sabha constituency
- Assembly Constituency: Pappireddipatti Assembly constituency

Kuppur is a village panchayat in the Dharmapuri district, Tamil Nadu, India.

== Description ==
It is located in the Dharmapuri area of the Dharmapuri district of Tamil Nadu. This Panchayat falls under the Paprirettipatti Legislative Assembly Constituency and Dharmapuri Lok Sabha Constituency. This panchayat has a total of 7 panchayat constituencies. 7 Panchayat Council members are elected from these.

== See also ==
- Dharmapuri (Lok Sabha constituency)
