= Palacode Assembly constituency =

State Legislative Assembly Constituency in Tamil Nadu

Coordinates: 12.303°N 78.073°E

Palacode
- Constituency No. 57 for the Tamil Nadu Legislative Assembly

Constituency details
- Country: India
- Region: South India
- State: Tamil Nadu
- District: Dharmapuri
- Lok Sabha constituency: Dharmapuri
- Established: 1967
- Total electors: 2,40,861

Member of Legislative Assembly
- 17th Tamil Nadu Legislative Assembly
- Incumbent K. P. Anbalagan
- Party: AIADMK
- Alliance: NDA
- Elected year: 2026

Palacode or Palacodu is a state assembly constituency in Dharmapuri district in Tamil Nadu, India. Its State Assembly Constituency number is 57. It comprises a portion of Palacode taluk and is a part of Dharmapuri Lok Sabha constituency for national elections to the Parliament of India. It is one of the 234 State Legislative Assembly Constituencies in Tamil Nadu, in India. Elections and winners in the constituency are listed below.

== Members of Legislative Assembly ==
Year	Winner	Party
1971	M. V. Karivengadam	Dravida Munnetra Kazhagam
1977	B. M. Krishnan	All India Anna Dravida Munnetra Kazhagam
1980	M. B. Munusamy	All India Anna Dravida Munnetra Kazhagam
1984	P. Theertharaman	All India Anna Dravida Munnetra Kazhagam
1989	K. Madhapan	All India Anna Dravida Munnetra Kazhagam
1991	M. G. Sekhar	All India Anna Dravida Munnetra Kazhagam
1996	G. L. Venkatachalam	Dravida Munnetra Kazhagam
2001	K. P. Anbalagan	All India Anna Dravida Munnetra Kazhagam
2006	K. P. Anbalagan	All India Anna Dravida Munnetra Kazhagam
2011	K. P. Anbalagan	All India Anna Dravida Munnetra Kazhagam
2016	K. P. Anbalagan	All India Anna Dravida Munnetra Kazhagam
2021	K. P. Anbalagan	All India Anna Dravida Munnetra Kazhagam
2026	K. P. Anbalagan	All India Anna Dravida Munnetra Kazhagam

== Election results ==
Vote share of winning candidates
2026	45.64%
2021	53.63%
2016	40.34%
2011	60.72%
2006	44.21%
2001	62.38%
1996	49.74%
1991	62.17%
1989	38.77%
1984	65.93%
1980	52.36%
1977	32.87%
1971	52.84%
1967	50.05%

=== 2026 ===
2026 Tamil Nadu Legislative Assembly election: Palacode
Party	Candidate	Votes	%	±%
AIADMK	K. P. Anbalagan	102,807	45.64	▼7.99
TVK	Gopi. R	63,765	28.31	New
DMK	S. Senthilkumar	50,043	22.22	▼17.72
NTK	Boopathi. R	5,598	2.49	▼1.26
NOTA	None of the above	1,292	0.57	▼0.09
Margin of victory		39,042	17.33	▲3.64
Turnout		2,25,257	93.52	▲7.06
Registered electors		2,40,861		▲3,470
AIADMK hold		Swing	▼7.99	

=== 2021 ===
2021 Tamil Nadu Legislative Assembly election: Palacode
Party	Candidate	Votes	%	±%
AIADMK	K. P. Anbalagan	110,070	53.63	+13.29
DMK	P. K. Murugan	81,970	39.94	+2.77
NTK	G. Kalaiselvi	7,704	3.75	+3.49
DMDK	P. Vijayasankar	2,409	1.17	−1.43
NOTA	NOTA	1,351	0.66	−0.34
MNM	D. Rajasekar	1,176	0.57	New
Margin of victory		28,100	13.69	10.52
Turnout		205,244	86.46	−2.11
Rejected ballots		342	0.17	
Registered electors		237,391		
AIADMK hold		Swing	13.29	

=== 2016 ===
2016 Tamil Nadu Legislative Assembly election: Palacode
Party	Candidate	Votes	%	±%
AIADMK	K. P. Anbalagan	76,143	40.34	−20.38
DMK	P. K. Murugan	70,160	37.17	New
PMK	K. Mannan	31,612	16.75	−16.32
DMDK	K. G. Kaverivarman	4,915	2.60	New
NOTA	NOTA	1,880	1.00	New
Margin of victory		5,983	3.17	−24.49
Turnout		188,767	88.57	1.85
Registered electors		213,136		
AIADMK hold		Swing	-20.38	

=== 2011 ===
2011 Tamil Nadu Legislative Assembly election: Palacode
Party	Candidate	Votes	%	±%
AIADMK	K. P. Anbalagan	94,877	60.72	+16.51
PMK	V. Selvam	51,664	33.06	−7.93
Independent	K. Harinath	2,449	1.57	New
BJP	K. P. Kumaradevan	1,937	1.24	+0.46
Independent	M. Ramasamy	1,101	0.70	New
IJK	M. Kalaichelvan	874	0.56	New
Margin of victory		43,213	27.65	24.44
Turnout		180,193	86.72	9.86
Registered electors		156,258		
AIADMK hold		Swing	16.51	

=== 2006 ===
2006 Tamil Nadu Legislative Assembly election: Palacode
Party	Candidate	Votes	%	±%
AIADMK	K. P. Anbalagan	66,711	44.21	−18.17
PMK	K. Mannan	61,867	41.00	New
DMDK	P. Vijayashankar	11,882	7.87	New
Independent	P. Rajagopal	2,612	1.73	New
Independent	P. Ravishankar	2,356	1.56	New
Independent	M. Maran	1,700	1.13	New
Independent	S. Mathivanan	1,418	0.94	New
BJP	D. Rameshkumar	1,181	0.78	New
Margin of victory		4,844	3.21	−30.13
Turnout		150,902	76.86	17.24
Registered electors		196,330		
AIADMK hold		Swing	-18.17	

=== 2001 ===
2001 Tamil Nadu Legislative Assembly election: Palacode
Party	Candidate	Votes	%	±%
AIADMK	K. P. Anbalagan	75,284	62.38	+31.93
DMK	G. L. Venkatachalam	35,052	29.04	−20.7
MDMK	G. V. Madhiyan	4,648	3.85	−1.66
Independent	Prakash N	2,781	2.30	New
LJP	Vijaya Kumar M	1,169	0.97	New
Independent	A. Anwarbasha	1,113	0.92	New
Independent	R. Chandrasekar	638	0.53	New
Margin of victory		40,232	33.34	14.04
Turnout		120,685	59.62	−7.76
Registered electors		202,427		
AIADMK gain from DMK		Swing	12.64	

=== 1996 ===
1996 Tamil Nadu Legislative Assembly election: Palacode
Party	Candidate	Votes	%	±%
DMK	G. L. Venkatachalam	56,917	49.74	New
AIADMK	C. Gopal	34,844	30.45	−31.72
PMK	K. Mannan	13,909	12.16	New
MDMK	G. V. Madhaiyan	6,307	5.51	New
BJP	P. Muthuraj	944	0.83	−0.19
Margin of victory		22,073	19.29	−19.35
Turnout		114,419	67.38	1.21
Registered electors		181,729		
DMK gain from AIADMK		Swing	-12.43	

=== 1991 ===
1991 Tamil Nadu Legislative Assembly election: Palacode
Party	Candidate	Votes	%	±%
AIADMK	M. G. Sekhar	63,170	62.17	+23.4
JD	K. Arunachalam	23,911	23.53	New
PMK	K. Mannan	12,423	12.23	New
BJP	P. V. Shivasankaran	1,027	1.01	New
Independent	Saminathan	749	0.74	New
Margin of victory		39,259	38.64	33.94
Turnout		101,609	66.17	−1.66
Registered electors		161,704		
AIADMK hold		Swing	23.40	

=== 1989 ===
1989 Tamil Nadu Legislative Assembly election: Palacode
Party	Candidate	Votes	%	±%
AIADMK	K. Madhapan	37,168	38.77	New
DMK	T. Chandrasekar	32,668	34.08	+3.12
INC	P. Theertharaman	16,440	17.15	−48.78
AIADMK	D. M. Nagarajan	7,430	7.75	New
Independent	A. Chinnasamy	671	0.70	New
Margin of victory		4,500	4.69	−30.27
Turnout		95,857	67.83	−2.03
Registered electors		145,254		
AIADMK gain from INC		Swing	-27.16	

=== 1984 ===
1984 Tamil Nadu Legislative Assembly election: Palacode
Party	Candidate	Votes	%	±%
AIADMK	P. Theertharaman	55,459	65.93	+19.13
DMK	M. B. Munusamigounder	26,045	30.96	New
Independent	P. Balaraman	2,131	2.53	New
Independent	P. Govindasamy	482	0.57	New
Margin of victory		29,414	34.97	29.42
Turnout		84,117	69.86	3.23
Registered electors		125,689		
AIADMK hold		Swing	13.57	

=== 1980 ===
1980 Tamil Nadu Legislative Assembly election: Palacode
Party	Candidate	Votes	%	±%
AIADMK	M. B. Munusamy	38,999	52.36	+19.48
INC	R. Balasubhrmaniam	34,864	46.81	+34.43
JP	P. Krishnan	624	0.84	New
Margin of victory		4,135	5.55	−0.82
Turnout		74,487	66.63	0.46
Registered electors		113,628		
AIADMK hold		Swing	19.48	

=== 1977 ===
1977 Tamil Nadu Legislative Assembly election: Palacode
Party	Candidate	Votes	%	±%
AIADMK	B. M. Krishnan	21,959	32.87	New
JP	K. T. Govindan	17,701	26.50	New
DMK	B. M. Munisamy Gounder	17,507	26.21	−26.63
INC	M. D. Narayanaswamy	8,266	12.37	−34.79
Independent	K. M. Saminathan	1,364	2.04	New
Margin of victory		4,258	6.37	0.70
Turnout		66,797	66.17	0.88
Registered electors		102,568		
AIADMK gain from DMK		Swing	-19.96	

=== 1971 ===
1971 Tamil Nadu Legislative Assembly election: Palacode
Party	Candidate	Votes	%	±%
DMK	M. V. Karivengadam	32,378	52.84	+8.08
INC	B. K. Narashiman	28,901	47.16	−2.89
Margin of victory		3,477	5.67	0.37
Turnout		61,279	65.28	−3.23
Registered electors		102,286		
DMK gain from INC		Swing	2.78	

=== 1967 ===
1967 Madras Legislative Assembly election: Palacode
Party	Candidate	Votes	%	±%
INC	K. Murugesan	29,186	50.05	New
DMK	M. B. Munusamy	26,096	44.75	New
Independent	K. K. Gounder	1,135	1.95	New
Independent	P. Nanjappan	996	1.71	New
Independent	S. A. Pandit	897	1.54	New
Margin of victory		3,090	5.30	
Turnout		58,310	68.52	
Registered electors		88,883		
INC win (new seat)				
