= List of educational institutions in Dharmapuri district =

This is a list of the schools and colleges in Dharmapuri district, Tamil Nadu, India.

Many educational institutions in Dharmapuri District have opened in the 21st century. Dharmapuri district was one of Tamil Nadu's lowest-performing districts in 2011, with a literacy rate of 62.5%. By 2016, the literacy rate had increased to 92.5% and was ranked as 15th among the state's 32 districts. As of May 2021, the Dharmapuri district had over 50 colleges and over 300 schools, including government-funded and private schools.

== Schools ==
=== CBSE schools ===
The district has more than 28 CBSE schools, both government and private. The list includes:

- Advaith International Academy
- Asian Christian High School
- Avvai Vidhyashram Public School
- Cambridge Public E-school
- Dawn Shikshalaya Public School
- Dheeran Chinnamalai International Residential School
- Eden Garden English School
- Harur International School
- Indian Public School
- Kamalam International School
- Kendirya Vidyalaya
- Litera Valley Zee School
- Maharishi Vidya Mandir Sr Sec School
- Mathakondapalli Model School
- Nalanda International Public School
- Kethureddipatti Government High School
- Open Arms Matriculation School
- Sassi Gnanodaya Academy
- Senthil Public School
- Shemford School
- Sivam International School
- Sri Ram Public School
- Sri Vijay Vidyashram
- St.arokia Annai School
- Taruwin Vidhya Mandir School
- The Ashok Leyland School
- The Vijay Millennium School
- Tvs Academy
- Vailankanni Public School

=== State board schools ===
These schools follow the syllabus of the Tamil Nadu State Board. Popular schools include:

- ERK Higher Secondary School, Erumiyampatti
- Sri Vijay vidyalaya Matric school, Pennagaram road
- Bharathi Vidyalaya
- Sri Vijay vidyalaya Matric school, Gandhinagar
- Senthil Matric school, Near city park
- Pachanmuthu Matric school, Near GDMC
- Dawn Matric school, S.V.Road, Dharmapuri.
- Indian Matric school, Morapur road
- Don Bosco Matric school, Bengaluru -Dharmapuri NH, Gundalpatti
- Sri vidya Mandir, Palacode Town
- Sacred Heart Matric school, Sellyiampatti
- Paramveer Hi-tech, Dharmapuri Road, pauparapatti.
- Bharathi Vidyalaya High School, Veppampatty
- Paramveer Matric Hr sec school Dharmapur
- Sri Ram Vidyalaya High Tech Modern School, Kalanikattur, Nagarkoodal, Dharmapuri-Dt.
- Seventh day Adventist Matric Hr.Sec.School Opp.Collectorate Dharmapuri

== Colleges ==
=== Medical colleges ===
The District has only one Government medical college.

- Government Dharmapuri Medical college, Dharmapuri

=== Pharmacy colleges ===
The List of Colleges in Dharmapuri District offering pharmacy courses are:

- ERK College of Pharmacy
- Sri Lakshmi Narayanan College of Pharmacy
- Pachamuthu College of Pharmacy
- AMS College of Pharmacy
- Sri Vijaya Vidyalaya College of Pharmacy
- Padmavathi College of Pharmacy

=== Nursing and Paramedical colleges ===
The List of Colleges in Dharmapuri District offering Nursing and other paramedical courses are:

- ERK College of Nursing
- ERK Institute of Paramedical Science - Diplomo in Health Inspector
- ERK School of Nursing-ANM
- Padmavathi College of Nursing
- Pachamuthu College of Nursing
- AMS College of Nursing
- Vijay College of Nursing

=== Engineering Colleges ===
*Government College of Engineering, Dharmapuri

- Jayam College of Engineering and Technology (Affiliated to Anna University, Chennai)
- Jayalakshmi Institute of Technology (Affiliated to Anna University, Chennai)
- Shreenivasa Engineering College (Affiliated to Anna University, Chennai)
- Varuvan vadivelan instuite of Technology (Affiliated to Anna University, Chennai)

=== Polytechnic Colleges ===
- Jayam Polytechnic College
- Marutham Nelli Polytechnic College
- Paramveer Polytechnic College
- Moogambigai Polytechnic College

=== College of Education ===
- E.R.K College of Education (Women) (Approved by NCTE and Affiliated to TNTEU)
- Sri Vijay Vidyalaya College of Education (Affiliated to Tamil Nadu Teachers Education University (TNTEU), Chennai)
- Saya Ghosh College of Education (TNTEU)
- Don Bosco College of Education and Research Institute (DBCERI) (TNTEU)
- Samy College of Education (TNTEU)
- Varuvan Vadivelan College of Education (TNTEU)
- Siva College of Education (TNTEU)
- Annai India College of Education (TNTEU)
- Vishwa Bharati College of Education (TNTEU)
- Paspo College of Education (TNTEU)
- Adiparasakthi Teacher Training Institute (TNTEU)
- Anna Arivagam College of Education (TNTEU)
- Christ College of Education for Women (TNTEU)
- Velammal College of Education (TNTEU)
- Shri Vijay Vidhyalaya College of Education (TNTEU)
- Shri Gokulakrishna College of Education (TNTEU)
- Girivasan College of Education (TNTEU)
- PDR Vellachiammal College of Education (TNTEU)
- Sri Vidhya Mandhir College of Education (TNTEU)
- Stanley College of Education (TNTEU)
- Thalapathy College of Education (TNTEU)
- Paramveer College of Education (TNTEU)
- Pachamuthu College of Education (TNTEU)
- Jaisakthi College of Education (TNTEU)
- Raadha College of Education (TNTEU)
- PDR College of Education (TNTEU)
- Annai College of Education (TNTEU)
- Paramveer College of Education

=== Arts and science colleges ===
- ERK Arts and Science College
- Government Arts and Science College, Dharmapuri.
- Pee Gee College of Arts and Science (Affiliated to Periyar University, Salem)
