= K. P. Anbalagan =

Indian politician

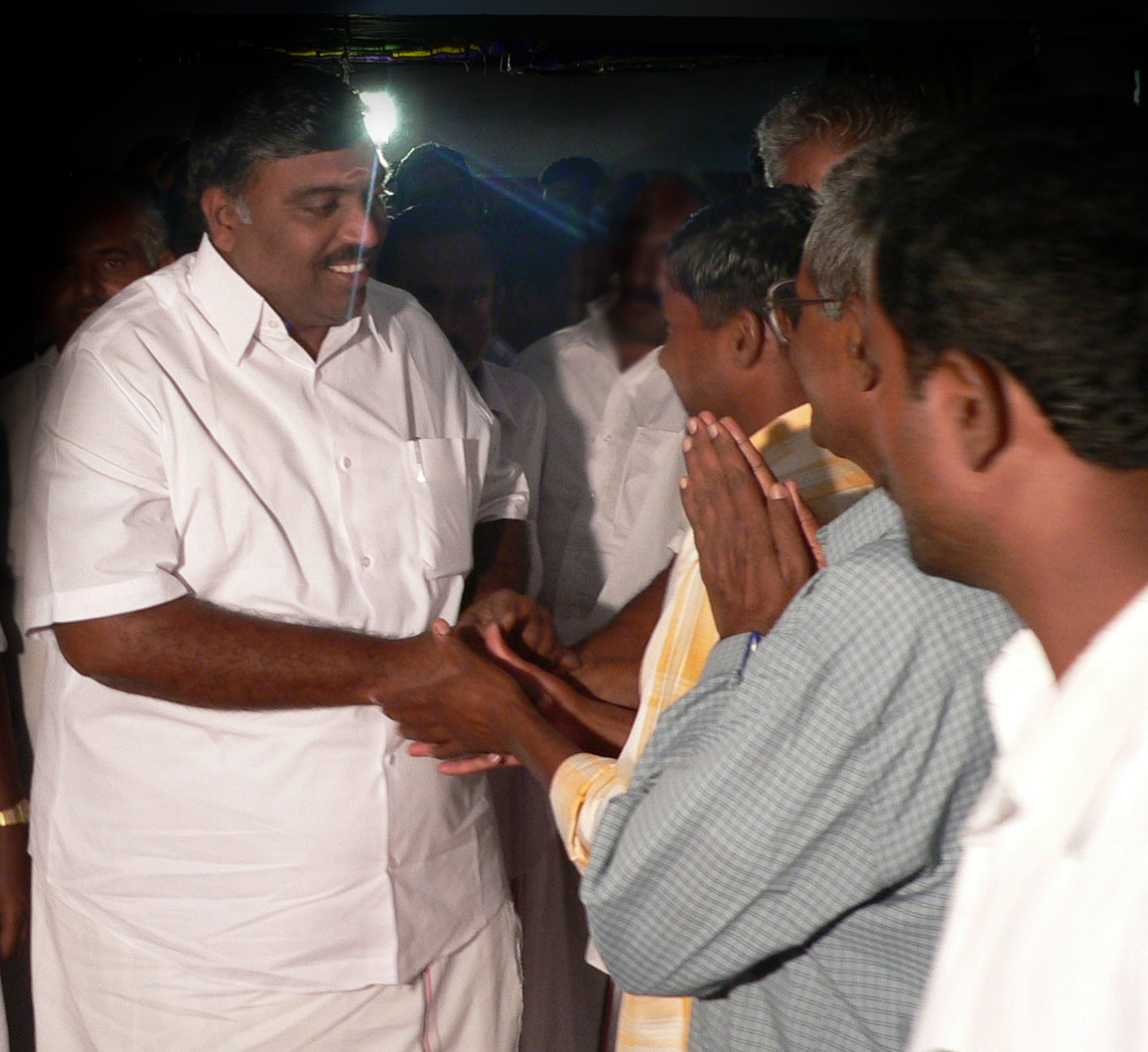
- Anbalagan in 2005

Member of the Tamil Nadu Legislative Assembly
- Incumbent
- Assumed office 14 May 2001
- Preceded by: G. L. Venkatachalam
- Constituency: Palacode

Minister for Higher Education Government of Tamil Nadu
- In office 23 May 2016 – 6 May 2021
- Chief Minister: J. Jayalalithaa; O. Panneerselvam; Edappadi K. Palaniswami
- Preceded by: P. Palaniappan
- Succeeded by: K. Ponmudy

Personal details
- Born: Kariamangalam Pachiappan Anbalagan; 30 April 1958 (age 68) Kariamangalam, Madras State, India
- Party: All India Anna Dravida Munnetra Kazhagam
- Spouse: Mallika
- Children: 2
- Parent: K. T. Pachiappan (father)

Kariamangalam Pachiappan Anbalagan (born 30 April 1958) is an Indian politician from the All India Anna Dravida Munnetra Kazhagam who was the former Minister for Higher Education and Agriculture department of Tamil Nadu. He belongs to the Vanniyar community, and is presently serving his fifth term as a Member of Legislative Assembly from Palacode, making him the longest serving MLA in the current Tamil Nadu Legislative Assembly, a record which he holds with fellow party members O. Panneerselvam and Pollachi V. Jayaraman.

== Career ==
He pursued his career into mainstream politics in 1996 and joined the AIADMK party in the same year. He was elected to the Tamil Nadu Legislative Assembly from Palacode constituency in 2001 and 2016. He was appointed the secretary of the Dharmapuri District in 2016 by the then Chief Minister of the state J. Jayalalithaa. He served as the Minister for Higher Education in the Government of Tamil Nadu and he was previously appointed the Minister for Municipal Administration, Rural Development & Information Minister of the state in 2009–2011.

On 19 June 2020, while being the Education Minister he himself reportedly confirmed that he tested positive for COVID-19 becoming the second major MLA from Tamil Nadu to be diagnosed with the virus after J. Anbazhagan. However the chief minister Edappadi K. Palaniswami denied the reports regarding Anbalagan diagnosed with coronavirus.

== Electoral performance ==
2026 Tamil Nadu Legislative Assembly election: Palacode
Party	Candidate	Votes	%	±%
AIADMK	K. P. Anbalagan	102,807	45.64	▼7.99
TVK	Gopi. R	63,765	28.31	New
DMK	S. Senthilkumar	50,043	22.22	▼17.72
NTK	Boopathi. R	5,598	2.49	▼1.26
NOTA	None of the above	1,292	0.57	▼0.09
Margin of victory		39,042	17.33	▲3.64
Turnout		2,25,257	93.52	▲7.06
Registered electors		2,40,861		▲3,470
AIADMK hold		Swing	▼7.99	

2021 Tamil Nadu Legislative Assembly election: Palacode
Party	Candidate	Votes	%	±%
AIADMK	K. P. Anbalagan	110,070	53.63	+13.29
DMK	P. K. Murugan	81,970	39.94	+2.77
NTK	G. Kalaiselvi	7,704	3.75	+3.49
DMDK	P. Vijayasankar	2,409	1.17	−1.43
NOTA	NOTA	1,351	0.66	−0.34
MNM	D. Rajasekar	1,176	0.57	New
Margin of victory		28,100	13.69	10.52
Turnout		205,244	86.46	−2.11
Rejected ballots		342	0.17	
Registered electors		237,391		
AIADMK hold		Swing	13.29	

2016 Tamil Nadu Legislative Assembly election: Palacode
Party	Candidate	Votes	%	±%
AIADMK	K. P. Anbalagan	76,143	40.34	−20.38
DMK	P. K. Murugan	70,160	37.17	New
PMK	K. Mannan	31,612	16.75	−16.32
DMDK	K. G. Kaverivarman	4,915	2.60	New
NOTA	NOTA	1,880	1.00	New
Margin of victory		5,983	3.17	−24.49
Turnout		188,767	88.57	1.85
Registered electors		213,136		
AIADMK hold		Swing	-20.38	

2011 Tamil Nadu Legislative Assembly election: Palacode
Party	Candidate	Votes	%	±%
AIADMK	K. P. Anbalagan	94,877	60.72	+16.51
PMK	V. Selvam	51,664	33.06	−7.93
Independent	K. Harinath	2,449	1.57	New
BJP	K. P. Kumaradevan	1,937	1.24	+0.46
Independent	M. Ramasamy	1,101	0.70	New
IJK	M. Kalaichelvan	874	0.56	New
Margin of victory		43,213	27.65	24.44
Turnout		180,193	86.72	9.86
Registered electors		156,258		
AIADMK hold		Swing	16.51	

2006 Tamil Nadu Legislative Assembly election: Palacode
Party	Candidate	Votes	%	±%
AIADMK	K. P. Anbalagan	66,711	44.21	−18.17
PMK	K. Mannan	61,867	41.00	New
DMDK	P. Vijayashankar	11,882	7.87	New
Independent	P. Rajagopal	2,612	1.73	New
Independent	P. Ravishankar	2,356	1.56	New
Independent	M. Maran	1,700	1.13	New
Independent	S. Mathivanan	1,418	0.94	New
BJP	D. Rameshkumar	1,181	0.78	New
Margin of victory		4,844	3.21	−30.13
Turnout		150,902	76.86	17.24
Registered electors		196,330		
AIADMK hold		Swing	-18.17	

2001 Tamil Nadu Legislative Assembly election: Palacode
Party	Candidate	Votes	%	±%
AIADMK	K. P. Anbalagan	75,284	62.38	+31.93
DMK	G. L. Venkatachalam	35,052	29.04	−20.7
MDMK	G. V. Madhiyan	4,648	3.85	−1.66
Independent	Prakash N	2,781	2.30	New
LJP	Vijaya Kumar M	1,169	0.97	New
Independent	A. Anwarbasha	1,113	0.92	New
Independent	R. Chandrasekar	638	0.53	New
Margin of victory		40,232	33.34	14.04
Turnout		120,685	59.62	−7.76
Registered electors		202,427		
AIADMK gain from DMK		Swing	12.64	
