= Anna Mani =

Indian physicist and meteorologist (1918–2001)

Anna Modayil Mani
- Anna Mani
- Born: 23 August 1918; Peermade, Travancore
- Died: 16 August 2001 (aged 82); Thiruvananthapuram, Kerala, India
- Scientific career
- Fields: Meteorology, Physics
- Workplaces: Indian Meteorological Department, Pune and Raman Research Institute, Bangalore

Anna Mani (23 August 1918 – 16 August 2001) was an Indian physicist and meteorologist. She retired as the deputy director general of the Indian Meteorological Department and also served as a visiting professor at the Raman Research Institute. Mani made contributions to the field of meteorological instrumentation, conducted research, and published numerous papers on solar radiation, ozone, and wind energy measurements.

== Life ==
=== Early years ===
Anna Modayil Mani was born in 1918 at Peermade, then Travancore, now Kerala, India to a Syrian Christian family. Her father was a civil engineer. She was the seventh of eight children in her family, and a voracious reader. Impressed by Gandhi during Vaikom satyagraha and inspired by his nationalist movement, she took to wearing only khadi garments.

=== Education ===
During the early 1900s, it was rare for young girls in India to receive an education. In fact, less than one percent of the Indian female population was literate at the time and less than a thousand of college enrollments were females. However, Mani sought to break the norm and pursue her passion for learning through higher education. Mani attended the Presidency College, Chennai (then Madras) where she earned a Bachelor of Science degree with honors in physics and chemistry. Later in 1940, the prestigious Indian Institute of Science gave Mani a scholarship to continue her education and research in physics. Through her pursuit for education in science, Mani set a strong foundation for her later works and accomplishments.

=== Career ===
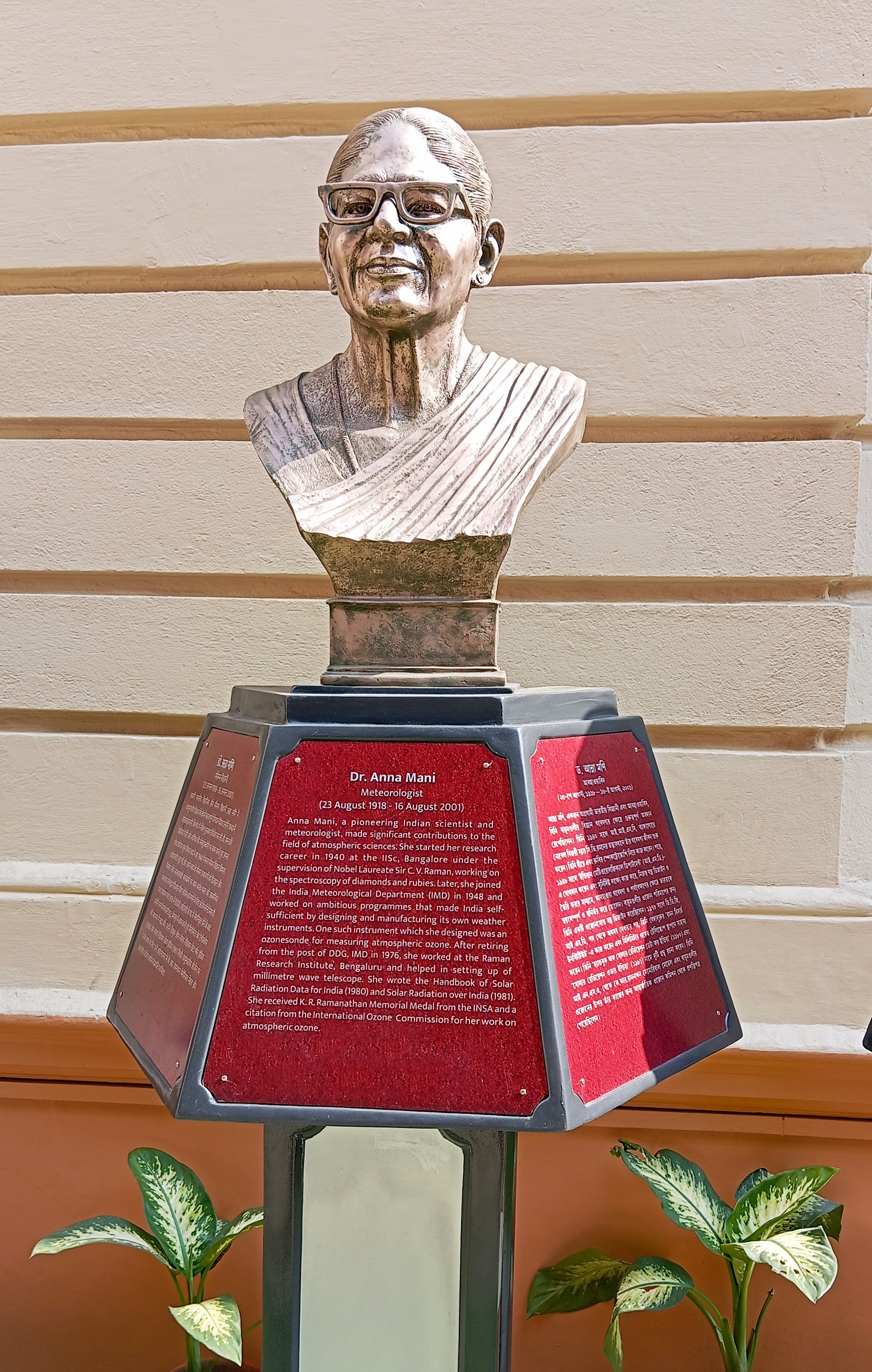
Statue of Anna Mani, Birla Industrial & Technological Museum, Kolkata, West Bengal, India

After graduation, Mani made several pathbreaking contributions to the scientific research field. At the Institute of Science, Mani was mentored by C.V. Raman, who is a winner of the Nobel Prize in Physics for his work in the properties of rubies and diamonds. Mani worked tirelessly and often sacrificed up to 20 hours in the lab recording and analyzing the luminescence of diamonds. Between 1942 and 1945, Anna Mani authored five single academic paper on the spectroscopy of rubies and diamonds. In addition, Mani wrote a PhD dissertation at the University of Madras for a formal degree, however she was declined due to her lack of a master's degree. Despite this pitfall, Mani continued her research internship with a government scholarship award in England. At the Imperial College London, Mani would be introduced to meteorology and various weather instruments. This was her first step in charting a path as meteorologist and revolutionizing the scientific community in India.

==== Meteorology ====
Before India gained its independence in 1947, the country relied on other countries for simple scientific instruments. When Anna Mani returned to India in 1948, she joined the Indian Meteorological Department (IMD) and worked in the instruments division. She worked with politician S. P. Venkiteshwaran, who had a vision of making India self-reliant in the scientific field. With this mission in mind, Mani helped with manufacturing and calibrating various weather instruments for India. She eventually took charge of the division and led 121 men under her. With her team of scientists, they “standardized the drawings for nearly 100 different weather instruments and started their production.” More impressively, Mani ventured into two unexplored field in India at the time: solar energy and wind power. Her team set up a network of monitoring stations across India to harness solar radiation as well as measurement equipment to study wind patterns. To further India's self-reliance, Mani's team designed and developed various radiation instruments. Additionally, Mani was one of the few during her time who saw the potential of the ozone layer and the crucial role it played. Therefore, she invented the ozonesonde, which is a reliable instrument used to measure the ozone layer. As a result of her work, she became a part of the International Ozone Commission. The instruments and research developed by Mani and her team helped India predict the weather with precision, as well as expand its meteorological field.

=== Death ===
In 1994, Mani suffered a stroke and died on 16 August 2001 in Thiruvananthapuram, at age 82.

== Personal ==
Anna Mani was born to a wealthy family. In her teens, Mani chose to study instead of getting married like her sisters. Mani never married and never regretted that decision.

== Books ==
Mani retired as the deputy director general of the India Meteorological Department in 1976. However, she did not stop working and wrote two books: Handbook of Solar Radiation Data for India (1980) and Solar Radiation over India (1981).

=== Selected publications ===
- 1992. Wind Energy Resource Survey in India, vv. 2. xi + 22 pp. Ed. Allied Publ. ISBN 8170233585, ISBN 9788170233589
- 1981. Solar Radiation over India x + 548 pp.
- 1980. The Handbook for Solar Radiation data for India

== Honors ==
Mani participated in various organizations such as the International Solar Energy Society, Indian National Science Academy, American Meteorological Society, and others. Mani was honored and recognized for her important contributions and in 1987 she was awarded the INSA K. R.Ramanathan Medal.

The World Meteorological Organization remembered her on her 100th birth anniversary and published her life profile along with an interview.

On 23 August 2022, Google honoured Mani with a Google Doodle on her 104th birth anniversary.
