= Sri Gandhi Ramadoss =

Tamil politician

Srikanthi Ramadoss
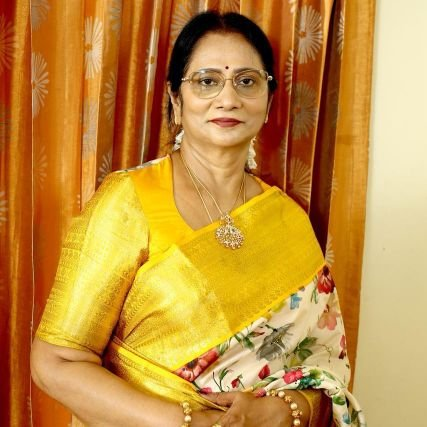

Working Leader Pattali Makkal Katchi
- Leader: Pasumai Thaayagam

Personal details
- Born: 1 June 1966 (age 60)
- Party: Pattali Makkal Katchi
- Children: Mukundhan, Prithivan, Suganthan
- Nickname: Akka

Srikanthi Ramadoss is an Indian politician from Tamil Nadu. She is the working leader of Pattali Makkal Katchi and the president of Pasumai Thaayagam. She is the elder daughter of founding president S. Ramadoss

== Personal life ==
Srikanthi Ramadoss is married to Parasuraman. She heads NGO Pasumai Thaayagam, which was founded in 1995 by his father S. Ramadoss. The NGO focuses on planting trees, desilting lakes and building check dams to conserve water. It also advocates for the welfare of Sri Lankan Tamils.
