= Thammanampatti =

Village in Tamil Nadu, India

Coordinates: 12.120565°N 78.20961°E

Thammanampatti is one of the village of Dharmapuri district, Tamil Nadu, India. Thammanampatti is located nearly south side to Dharmapuri. The total distance between Dharmapuri to Thammanampatti is 8 kilometers.
