= Dharmapuri, Tamil Nadu Assembly constituency =

State Legislative Assembly Constituency in Tamil Nadu

Coordinates: 12.1260°N 78.154°E

Dharmapuri
- Constituency No. 59 for the Tamil Nadu Legislative Assembly

Constituency details
- Country: India
- Region: South India
- State: Tamil Nadu
- District: Dharmapuri
- Lok Sabha constituency: Dharmapuri
- Established: 1951
- Total electors: 2,60,979
- Reservation: None

Member of Legislative Assembly
- 17th Tamil Nadu Legislative Assembly
- Incumbent Sowmiya Anbumani
- Party: PMK
- Alliance: NDA
- Elected year: 2026

Dharmapuri is a state assembly constituency in Dharmapuri district in Tamil Nadu, India. Its State Assembly Constituency number is 59. It comprises a portion of Dharmapuri taluk and is a part of the similarly named constituency which is used for national elections to the Parliament of India. It is one of the 234 State Legislative Assembly Constituencies in Tamil Nadu, in India.

== Members of Legislative Assembly ==
| Year | Member | Political party |
Madras State
| 1952 | P. Rajagopala Gounder | Independent |
| 1957 | M. Kandasami Kandar | Indian National Congress |
| 1962 | R. S. Veerappa Chettiar | Independent |
| 1967 | M. S. Gaounder | Dravida Munnetra Kazhagam |
Tamil Nadu
| 1971 | R. Chinnasamy | Dravida Munnetra Kazhagam |
| 1977 | P. K. C. Muthusamy | Janata Party |
| 1980 | S. Aranganathan | All India Anna Dravida Munnetra Kazhagam |
| 1984 | R. Chinnasamy | Dravida Munnetra Kazhagam |
| 1989 | R. Chinnasamy | Dravida Munnetra Kazhagam |
| 1991 | P. Ponnusamy | Indian National Congress |
| 1996 | K. Manoharan | Dravida Munnetra Kazhagam |
| 2001 | K. Paarry Mohan | Pattali Makkal Katchi |
| 2006 | L. Velusamy | Pattali Makkal Katchi |
| 2011 | A. Baskar | Desiya Murpokku Dravida Kazhagam |
| 2016 | P. Subramani | Dravida Munnetra Kazhagam |
| 2021 | S. P. Venkateshwaran | Pattali Makkal Katchi |
| 2026 | Sowmiya Anbumani | Pattali Makkal Katchi |

== Election results ==
Vote share of winning candidates
| 2026 | 39.28% |
| 2021 | 48.99% |
| 2016 | 34.25% |
| 2011 | 45.73% |
| 2006 | 51.58% |
| 2001 | 46.65% |
| 1996 | 55.28% |
| 1991 | 51.11% |
| 1989 | 45.62% |
| 1984 | 54.21% |
| 1980 | 46.12% |
| 1977 | 42.30% |
| 1971 | 54.16% |
| 1967 | 53.02% |
| 1962 | 40.81% |
| 1957 | 35.19% |
| 1952 | 26.65% |

=== 2026 ===
2026 Tamil Nadu Legislative Assembly election: Dharmapuri
| Party | Candidate | Votes | % | ±% |
|---|---|---|---|---|
| PMK | Sowmiya Anbumani | 93,713 | 39.28 | ▼9.71 |
| TVK | Sivan. M | 72,817 | 30.52 | New |
| DMDK | Dr. Elangovan. V | 56,905 | 23.85 | New |
| NTK | Shanthalakshmi. K | 6,758 | 2.83 | ▼1.21 |
| Aanaithinthiya Jananayaka Pathukappu Kazhagam | Saravanan. A | 1,078 | 0.45 | New |
| Independent | Saravanan. G | 983 | 0.41 | New |
| NOTA | NOTA | 941 | 0.39 | ▼0.41 |
| Margin of victory | | 20,896 | 8.76 | ▼3.70 |
| Turnout | | 2,38,579 | 91.42 | ▲11.43 |
| Registered electors | | 2,60,979 | | ▼8,558 |
| PMK hold | | Swing | ▼9.71 | |

=== 2021 ===
2021 Tamil Nadu Legislative Assembly election: Dharmapuri
| Party | Candidate | Votes | % | ±% |
|---|---|---|---|---|
| PMK | S. P. Venkateshwaran | 105,630 | 48.99% | +21.65 |
| DMK | P. Subramani | 78,770 | 36.53% | +2.29 |
| AMMK | D. K. Rajendran | 11,226 | 5.21% | New |
| NTK | Senthil Kumar (A) A. Senthil | 8,700 | 4.04% | +3.45 |
| MNM | S. K. Jayavenkatesan | 5,083 | 2.36% | New |
| APTADMK | M. Natarajan | 1,897 | 0.88% | New |
| NOTA | NOTA | 1,726 | 0.80% | −0.28 |
| Margin of victory | | 26,860 | 12.46% | 7.79% |
| Turnout | | 215,607 | 79.99% | −2.24% |
| Rejected ballots | | 546 | 0.25% | |
| Registered electors | | 269,537 | | |
| PMK gain from DMK | | Swing | 14.74% | |

=== 2016 ===
2016 Tamil Nadu Legislative Assembly election: Dharmapuri
| Party | Candidate | Votes | % | ±% |
|---|---|---|---|---|
| DMK | P. Subramani | 71,056 | 34.25% | New |
| AIADMK | P. D. Elangovan | 61,380 | 29.58% | New |
| PMK | R. Senthil | 56,727 | 27.34% | −15.99 |
| DMDK | Dr. V. Elangovan | 9,348 | 4.51% | −41.23 |
| NOTA | NOTA | 2,251 | 1.08% | New |
| BJP | M. Arumugam | 1,606 | 0.77% | −0.91 |
| NTK | R. Rukmanidevi | 1,213 | 0.58% | New |
| Margin of victory | | 9,676 | 4.66% | 2.26% |
| Turnout | | 207,476 | 82.23% | 4.32% |
| Registered electors | | 252,311 | | |
| DMK gain from DMDK | | Swing | -11.48% | |

=== 2011 ===
2011 Tamil Nadu Legislative Assembly election: Dharmapuri
| Party | Candidate | Votes | % | ±% |
|---|---|---|---|---|
| DMDK | A. Baskar | 76,943 | 45.73% | +34.2 |
| PMK | P. Santhamoorthy | 72,900 | 43.33% | −8.26 |
| Independent | P. S. Raja | 6,937 | 4.12% | New |
| BJP | K. Prabakaran | 2,832 | 1.68% | +1.01 |
| Independent | K. Venkatesh | 2,630 | 1.56% | New |
| Independent | R. Sivan | 1,714 | 1.02% | New |
| Independent | C. Venkatachalam | 1,080 | 0.64% | New |
| BSP | K. Selvam | 1,068 | 0.63% | New |
| Independent | P. Prabhu | 911 | 0.54% | New |
| Margin of victory | | 4,043 | 2.40% | −18.05% |
| Turnout | | 168,248 | 77.91% | 9.31% |
| Registered electors | | 215,940 | | |
| DMDK gain from PMK | | Swing | -5.85% | |

=== 2006 ===
2006 Tamil Nadu Legislative Assembly election: Dharmapuri
| Party | Candidate | Votes | % | ±% |
|---|---|---|---|---|
| PMK | L. Velusamy | 76,195 | 51.58% | +4.93 |
| MDMK | V. S. Sampath | 45,988 | 31.13% | +24.13 |
| DMDK | A. Bhaskar | 17,030 | 11.53% | New |
| Independent | M. Jaganathan | 1,424 | 0.96% | New |
| Independent | D. Babu @ Babuji | 1,391 | 0.94% | New |
| Independent | K. Gnanavelavan | 1,146 | 0.78% | New |
| BJP | R. Boopathi | 996 | 0.67% | New |
| CPI(ML)L | K. Govindaraj | 759 | 0.51% | New |
| Margin of victory | | 30,207 | 20.45% | 11.33% |
| Turnout | | 147,708 | 68.61% | 15.23% |
| Registered electors | | 215,291 | | |
| PMK hold | | Swing | 4.93% | |

=== 2001 ===
2001 Tamil Nadu Legislative Assembly election: Dharmapuri
| Party | Candidate | Votes | % | ±% |
|---|---|---|---|---|
| PMK | K. Pary Mohan | 56,147 | 46.65% | New |
| DMK | K. Manokaran | 45,173 | 37.54% | −17.74 |
| MDMK | V. S. Sampath | 8,428 | 7.00% | −0.91 |
| Independent | M. Subramanian | 5,451 | 4.53% | New |
| Independent | K. Nagappan | 1,599 | 1.33% | New |
| Independent | M. Madhaiyan | 1,543 | 1.28% | New |
| BSP | K. Elangovan | 1,061 | 0.88% | New |
| Independent | R. Devendiran | 944 | 0.78% | New |
| Margin of victory | | 10,974 | 9.12% | −22.87% |
| Turnout | | 120,346 | 53.38% | −8.91% |
| Registered electors | | 225,468 | | |
| PMK gain from DMK | | Swing | -8.62% | |

=== 1996 ===
1996 Tamil Nadu Legislative Assembly election: Dharmapuri
| Party | Candidate | Votes | % | ±% |
|---|---|---|---|---|
| DMK | K. Manoharan (Dharmapuri) | 63,973 | 55.28% | +29.67 |
| INC | Mase Harur | 26,951 | 23.29% | −27.82 |
| AIIC(T) | Ponnusami | 13,230 | 11.43% | New |
| MDMK | K. Devarajan | 9,161 | 7.92% | New |
| Margin of victory | | 37,022 | 31.99% | 6.50% |
| Turnout | | 115,730 | 62.29% | −1.55% |
| Registered electors | | 198,433 | | |
| DMK gain from INC | | Swing | 4.17% | |

=== 1991 ===
1991 Tamil Nadu Legislative Assembly election: Dharmapuri
| Party | Candidate | Votes | % | ±% |
|---|---|---|---|---|
| INC | P. Ponnusamy | 53,910 | 51.11% | +22.95 |
| DMK | R. Chinnasamy | 27,017 | 25.61% | −20.01 |
| PMK | P. Ramalingam | 22,810 | 21.62% | New |
| Independent | R. Suresh | 768 | 0.73% | New |
| Margin of victory | | 26,893 | 25.49% | 8.04% |
| Turnout | | 105,484 | 63.83% | 15.59% |
| Registered electors | | 171,628 | | |
| INC gain from DMK | | Swing | 5.49% | |

=== 1989 ===
1989 Tamil Nadu Legislative Assembly election: Dharmapuri
| Party | Candidate | Votes | % | ±% |
|---|---|---|---|---|
| DMK | R. Chinnasamy | 32,794 | 45.62% | −8.59 |
| INC | P. Ponnuswamy | 20,243 | 28.16% | New |
| Independent | D. Sudha Mohan | 8,087 | 11.25% | New |
| India Farmers and Tailers Party | S. A. Chinnasamy | 5,627 | 7.83% | New |
| Independent | D. K. Madhiazhagan | 2,496 | 3.47% | New |
| Independent | M. Kaveri | 448 | 0.62% | New |
| Independent | S. V. Gopal | 439 | 0.61% | New |
| Independent | N. Saravanan | 433 | 0.60% | New |
| Independent | P. Asokan | 394 | 0.55% | New |
| Independent | M. Chinnavan | 384 | 0.53% | New |
| Margin of victory | | 12,551 | 17.46% | 7.58% |
| Turnout | | 71,889 | 48.24% | −20.25% |
| Registered electors | | 153,201 | | |
| DMK hold | | Swing | -8.59% | |

=== 1984 ===
1984 Tamil Nadu Legislative Assembly election: Dharmapuri
| Party | Candidate | Votes | % | ±% |
|---|---|---|---|---|
| DMK | R. Chinnasamy | 46,383 | 54.21% | New |
| AIADMK | S. Aranganathan | 37,929 | 44.33% | −1.79 |
| BJP | T. C. Rangarajan | 1,254 | 1.47% | New |
| Margin of victory | | 8,454 | 9.88% | 7.84% |
| Turnout | | 85,566 | 68.48% | 3.13% |
| Registered electors | | 133,042 | | |
| DMK gain from AIADMK | | Swing | 8.09% | |

=== 1980 ===
1980 Tamil Nadu Legislative Assembly election: Dharmapuri
| Party | Candidate | Votes | % | ±% |
|---|---|---|---|---|
| AIADMK | S. Aranganathan | 33,977 | 46.12% | +12.02 |
| INC | D. N. Vadivel | 32,472 | 44.08% | +35.94 |
| JP | P. Ponnusawmy | 7,222 | 9.80% | New |
| Margin of victory | | 1,505 | 2.04% | −6.16% |
| Turnout | | 73,671 | 65.36% | 2.99% |
| Registered electors | | 114,697 | | |
| AIADMK gain from JP | | Swing | 3.82% | |

=== 1977 ===
1977 Tamil Nadu Legislative Assembly election: Dharmapuri
| Party | Candidate | Votes | % | ±% |
|---|---|---|---|---|
| JP | P. K. C. Muthuswamy | 26,742 | 42.30% | New |
| AIADMK | D. S. Shanmugam | 21,556 | 34.10% | New |
| DMK | K. Periasamy | 7,721 | 12.21% | −41.95 |
| INC | D. K. Munusamy | 5,147 | 8.14% | −29.68 |
| Independent | K. K. Subramani | 1,206 | 1.91% | New |
| Independent | S. Abdul Vakith | 667 | 1.06% | New |
| Margin of victory | | 5,186 | 8.20% | −8.14% |
| Turnout | | 63,216 | 62.37% | −13.66% |
| Registered electors | | 102,768 | | |
| JP gain from DMK | | Swing | -11.86% | |

=== 1971 ===
1971 Tamil Nadu Legislative Assembly election: Dharmapuri
| Party | Candidate | Votes | % | ±% |
|---|---|---|---|---|
| DMK | R. Chinnasamy | 39,861 | 54.16% | +1.15 |
| INC | D. N. Adivel | 27,834 | 37.82% | −5.41 |
| Independent | T. Mariappa Udayar | 5,897 | 8.01% | New |
| Margin of victory | | 12,027 | 16.34% | 6.56% |
| Turnout | | 73,592 | 76.03% | −3.13% |
| Registered electors | | 100,350 | | |
| DMK hold | | Swing | 1.15% | |

=== 1967 ===
1967 Madras Legislative Assembly election: Dharmapuri
| Party | Candidate | Votes | % | ±% |
|---|---|---|---|---|
| DMK | M. S. Gounter | 36,258 | 53.02% | +21.37 |
| INC | D. N. Vadivel | 29,567 | 43.23% | +19.04 |
| Independent | D. M. Thangavelu | 1,397 | 2.04% | New |
| Independent | T. V. A. Chettiar | 676 | 0.99% | New |
| ABJS | J. A. K. M. Mudaliar | 493 | 0.72% | New |
| Margin of victory | | 6,691 | 9.78% | 0.61% |
| Turnout | | 68,391 | 79.16% | 16.52% |
| Registered electors | | 89,778 | | |
| DMK gain from Independent | | Swing | 12.20% | |

=== 1962 ===
1962 Madras Legislative Assembly election: Dharmapuri
| Party | Candidate | Votes | % | ±% |
|---|---|---|---|---|
| Independent | R. S. Veerappa Chettiar | 24,191 | 40.81% | New |
| DMK | M. Subramania Gounder | 18,754 | 31.64% | New |
| INC | M. Kandasami Kandar | 14,337 | 24.19% | −11 |
| Independent | P. R. Rajagopala Gounder | 1,989 | 3.36% | New |
| Margin of victory | | 5,437 | 9.17% | 8.56% |
| Turnout | | 59,271 | 62.64% | 26.44% |
| Registered electors | | 100,036 | | |
| Independent gain from INC | | Swing | 5.62% | |

=== 1957 ===
1957 Madras Legislative Assembly election: Dharmapuri
| Party | Candidate | Votes | % | ±% |
|---|---|---|---|---|
| INC | M. Kandasami Kandar | 11,661 | 35.19% | +12.18 |
| Independent | R. S. Veerappa Chetty | 11,459 | 34.58% | New |
| Independent | P. M. Kuppusami | 5,824 | 17.58% | New |
| Independent | P. R. Rajagopal Goundar | 4,192 | 12.65% | New |
| Margin of victory | | 202 | 0.61% | −0.41% |
| Turnout | | 33,136 | 36.20% | −8.22% |
| Registered electors | | 91,530 | | |
| INC gain from Independent | | Swing | 8.54% | |

=== 1952 ===
1952 Madras Legislative Assembly election: Dharmapuri
| Party | Candidate | Votes | % | ±% |
|---|---|---|---|---|
| Independent | P. R. Rajagopala Gounder | 7,262 | 26.65% | New |
| Independent | R. S. Veerappa Chettiar | 6,984 | 25.63% | New |
| INC | P. Appavu Pillai | 6,270 | 23.01% | New |
| Independent | V. Ayyam Perumal | 3,179 | 11.67% | New |
| Socialist Party (India) | G. Vadivelu | 2,040 | 7.49% | New |
| KMPP | T. Dharmalinga Mudaliar | 1,512 | 5.55% | New |
| Margin of victory | | 278 | 1.02% | |
| Turnout | | 27,247 | 44.43% | |
| Registered electors | | 61,331 | | |
| Independent win (new seat) | | | | |
