= K. Manokaran =

Indian politician

K. Manokaran was elected to the Tamil Nadu Legislative Assembly from the DharmapurI constituency in the 1996 elections. He was a candidate of the Dravida Munnetra Kazhagam (DMK) party.
