= National Highway 844 (India) =

National Highway in India

National Highway 844
- Map of National Highway 844 in red

Route information
- Auxiliary route of NH 44
- Length: 90 km (56 mi)

Major junctions
- North end: Hosur
- South end: Dharmapuri

Location
- Country: India
- States: Tamil Nadu

Highway system
- Roads in India; Expressways; National; State; Asian
← NH 44	→ NH 44

National Highway 844, commonly referred to as NH 844 is a national highway in India. It is a secondary route of National Highway 44. NH-844 starts from Neraluru Thirumagondanahalli Village near Shri Ramanamaharshi ashrama, Bengaluru state of Karnataka and ends in Dharmapuri district of Tamil Nadu in India. As of 2026, parts of this highway are still under construction.

== Route ==
NH 844 connects Neraluru village of Bengaluru, Karnataka and pass via Upkar Spring Fields layout and connects Hosur and Adiyamankottai, Dharmapuri in the state of Tamil Nadu.

== Junctions ==
NH 44 Terminal near Hosur.
NH 44 Terminal near Adiyamankottai, Dharmapuri

== See also ==
- List of national highways in India
- List of national highways in India by state
