= S. P. Venkateshwaran =

Indian politician

Member of the Tamil Nadu Legislative Assembly
- In office 12 May 2021 – 4 May 2026
- Preceded by: P. Subramani
- Constituency: Dharmapuri

Personal details
- Born: 1966 (age 59–60) Samichettipatti, Dharmapuri, Tamil Nadu, India
- Party: PMK (Anbumani)
- Parent: Perumal (father)
- Occupation: Politician, Farmer

Samichettipatti Perumal Venkateshwaran is an Indian politician who is a Member of Legislative Assembly of Tamil Nadu. He was elected from Dharmapuri as a Pattali Makkal Katchi candidate in 2021. In 2025, Venkateshwaran declared support for PMK President Anbumani Ramadoss, which resulted in him being censured by party founder S. Ramadoss, and, along with 2 other PMK MLAs, later joined the faction of the PMK led by Anbumani.

== Elections contested ==
Election	Constituency	Party	Result	Vote %	Runner-up	Runner-up Party	Runner-up vote %
2021 Tamil Nadu Legislative Assembly election	Dharmapuri	PMK	Won	48.99%	P. Subramani	DMK	36.53%
