= L. Velusamy =

Indian politician

L. Velusamy was elected to the Tamil Nadu Legislative Assembly from the Dharmapuri constituency in the 2006 election. He was a candidate of the Pattali Makkal Katchi (PMK) party.
