= A. Mani (Dharmapuri politician) =

Indian politician

Member of Parliament, Lok Sabha
- Incumbent
- Assumed office 9 June 2024
- Preceded by: Dr. S. Senthilkumar
- Constituency: Dharmapuri

Personal details
- Born: 31 August 1968 (age 58) Dharmapuri, Tamil Nadu
- Party: Dravida Munnetra Kazhagam
- Spouse: Bhuvaneswari S (m. 1994)
- Children: 1 son
- Parent(s): Aarimuthu Kuppusamigounder (father); Saroja Arimuthu (Mother)
- Education: Bachelor of Laws
- Alma mater: Madras University
- Profession: Politician; Advocate

Arimuthu Mani (born 31 August 1968) is an Indian politician has been serving as the Member of Parliament, Lok Sabha from Dharmapuri from 9 June 2024 and He is the member of Dravida Munnetra Kazhagam party of Tamil Nadu.

== Early life and education ==
Mani was born on 31 August 1968 at Aarimuthu Kuppusamigounder & Saroja Arimuthu's family in Dharmapuri, Tamil Nadu and He completed Bachelor of Laws degree from the Madras University.

== Personal life ==
Mani married to Bhuvaneswari S in year 1994 and he has one son and Mani is Advocate and Politician.

== Political career ==
In the 2024 Indian general election, he won from Dharmapuri Lok Sabha constituency seat by defeating Sowmiya Anbumani (PMK) by a margin of 21,300 votes.
