= K. Manoharan (Dharmapuri) =

Indian politician (born 1965)

Member, Tamil Nadu Legislative Assembly
- In office 1996–2001
- Preceded by: P. Ponnusamy
- Succeeded by: K. Paarry Mohan
- Constituency: Dharmapuri

Personal details
- Born: 10 November 1956 Chinneri, Mettupatti
- Party: Dravida Munnetra Kazhagam
- Profession: Farmer, Business

K. Manoharan is an Indian politician and a former member of the Tamil Nadu Legislative Assembly. He hails from Chinneri village in the Dharmapuri district. Manoharan, who has passed the PUC (Pre-University Course). He belongs to the Dravida Munnetra Kazhagam (DMK) party. He contested and won the election for the Dharmapuri constituency in the 1996 Tamil Nadu Legislative Assembly election, becoming a Member of the Legislative Assembly (MLA).

== Electoral performance ==
=== 1996 ===
1996 Tamil Nadu Legislative Assembly election: Dharmapuri
Party	Candidate	Votes	%	±%
DMK	K. Manoharan	63,973	55.28%	+29.67
INC	Mase Harur	26,951	23.29%	−27.82
AIIC(T)	Ponnusami	13,230	11.43%	New
MDMK	K. Devarajan	9,161	7.92%	New
Margin of victory		37,022	31.99%	6.50%
Turnout		115,730	62.29%	−1.55%
Registered electors		198,433		
DMK gain from INC		Swing	4.17%	
