= R. Chinnasamy =

Indian politician

R. Chinnasamy is an Indian politician and former Member of the Legislative Assembly of Tamil Nadu. He was elected to the Tamil Nadu legislative assembly from Dharmapuri constituency as a Dravida Munnetra Kazhagam candidate in 1971, 1984 and 1989 elections.

He was a district secretary in DMK for nearly 15 years.
