= G. L. Venkatachalam =

Indian politician

G. L. Venkatachalam was elected to the Tamil Nadu Legislative Assembly from the Palacode constituency in the 1996 elections. He was a candidate of the Dravida Munnetra Kazhagam (DMK) party.
