= Pasumai Thaayagam =

பசுமை தாயகம் - Pasumai Thaayagam ( meaning "Green Motherland" ) is a mass based, voluntary, Non-partisan, Non-governmental organization (NGO) from India that promotes nature conservation. Its jurisdiction covers the states of Tamil Nadu, Pondicherry, and parts of Andhra Pradesh, Kerala, and Karnataka. It has special consultative status with the United Nations.

== History ==
Pasumai Thaayagam was registered on 20 November 1995 under the Public Trust of India. It was founded by Dr. S. Ramadoss. This movement is currently headed by Dr. Anbumani Ramadoss. He led a number of protests to highlight environmental degradation thereby facilitating access for Pasumai Thayagam to ECOSOC ( United Nations Economic and Social Council ), the United Nations central platform for reflection, debate, and innovative thinking on sustainable development. He also facilitated for Pasumai Thayagam to get a special consultative status with the United Nations Human Rights Council General Debate in 2013. The organization witnessed incredible recognition worldwide under his exemplary leadership to an extent that Pasumai Thayagam is today accredited to being the lone member from TN to the United Nations Human Rights Council.

The organization has participated in the following events:

- Johannesburg Summit on Sustainable Development in 2002.
- 50th session of the Commission on the Status of Women in 2006.
- 60th International Conference on New or Restored Democracies in 2006.
- United Nations Human Rights Council General Debate in 2013, 2015.

In 2005, it received special consultative status with the United Nations. As a result, on 30 October 2015, Anbumani was able to voice the concern of Sri Lankan Tamils in UNHRC through Pasumai Thayagam Foundation.

== Goals ==
Pasumai Thaayagam primarily works for the preservation of the environment and ecologically sustainable development. It focuses on:

- Environmental regeneration
- Natural resources management
- Water management
- Massive tree plantation, and
- Promotion of environmental awareness.
