= Dharmapuri =

City in Tamil Nadu, India

Dharmapuri Thagadur
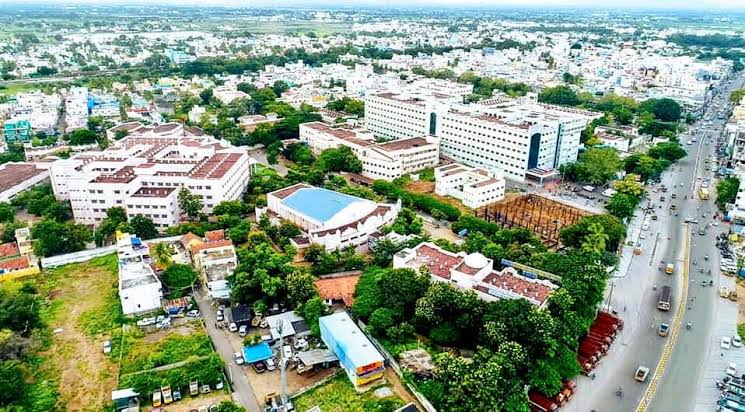
- Aerial view of mid-city
- Nicknames: Thagadoor, Dharmapuri
- Dharmapuri (Tamil Nadu) Dharmapuri (India)
- Coordinates: 12.121100°N 78.158200°E
- Country: India
- State: Tamil Nadu
- District: Dharmapuri
- Established: 10th Century BC
- Founder: The King Adhiyaman

Government
  - Type: Special Grade Municipality
  - Body: Dharmapuri Municipality

Area
  - Total: 25.32 km^{2} (9.78 sq mi)
  - Rank: 9
- Elevation: 482 m (1,581 ft)

Population (2011)
  - Total: 68,619
  - Density: 2,710/km^{2} (7,019/sq mi)

Languages
  - Official: Tamil
- Time zone: UTC+5:30 (IST)
- PIN: 636(7xx),636(8xx)
- Telephone code: 4342
- Vehicle registration: TN-29
- Website: www.dharmapuri.nic.in

Dharmapuri is a city in the north western part of Tamil Nadu, India. It serves as the administrative headquarters of Dharmapuri district which is the first district created in Tamil Nadu after the independence of India by splitting it from then Salem district on 2 October 1965. The city is located 57 km from Krishnagiri, 64 km from Salem, 64 km from Tirupattur, 101 km from Hosur, 119 km from Thiruvannamalai, 126 km from Bangalore and Erode, 180 km from Tiruppur, 200 km from Coimbatore and Tiruchirappalli, 300 km from Madurai and the state capital Chennai. It is located between latitudes N 11 47’ and 12 33’ and longitudes E 77 02’ and 78 40’. It is one of the major leading cultivators and producers of mangoes in the state along with Krishnagiri, and is often referred as Mango Capital of India.

== History ==
Dharmapuri was called Thagadoor(or Thagadur) where King Adhiyamaan ruled. Adhiyaman Kottai is situated near Dharmapuri-Salem highway. Many temples were built during Adhiyamaan's rule. There is a tunnel from Adhiyamaan kottai temple to Dharmapuri Kottai temple.

The region is believed to have been controlled by the Pallava dynasty in the 8th century. The Rashtrakutas took over in the 9th century. They were defeated by the Cholas in the 11th century, and subsequently the district came under the Chola sphere of governance.[2]

During 18th century present day Dharmapuri district was part of the Kingdom of Mysore and was called Baramahal. As part of the Treaty of Seringapatam (signed on 18 March 1792) after the Third Anglo-Mysore War, Tipu Sultan agreed to give part of his territories including present-day Dharmapuri district to the British East India Company which was then merged into the Madras Presidency an administrative subdivision of British India.

It was part of the salem District under British rule, until the founding of Dharmapuri district on 2 October 1965. The Dharmapuri district was split into Dharmapuri and Krishnagiri districts in 2004.[2] Many historical rock sculptures are found in this district. Modhur, a village near Dharmapuri has remains that date back to the Neolithic age. A government museum in Dharmapuri city displays some of these significant sculptures.

== Dharmapuri Municipality ==
| Date of change of local body type | Type of local body |
|---|---|
| 14 February 1964 | Third Grade Municipality |
| 5 August 1971 | Second Grade Municipality |
| 31 August 1987 | First Grade Municipality |
| 2 December 2008 | Selection Grade Municipality |
| 6 March 2019 | Special Grade Municipality |

The Dharmapuri Municipality has 33 wards. The Tamil Nadu government has changed the name of Special Grade Municipalities to "Perunagaratchigal" in Tamil, but they are still called "Special Grade Municipalities" in English.

== Geography ==
Dharmapuri is situated in the northwestern corner of Tamil Nadu and is bounded by the Eastern Ghats to the east, Nallampalli taluk to the South, Palacode taluk to the north, and the Pennagaram taluk to the west. It is located between latitudes N 11 47’ and 12 33’ and longitudes E 77 02’ and 78 40’. It is 300 km from Chennai city and 130 km from Bangalore. All the corporations in Tamil Nadu except Sivakasi, Nagercoil, Thoothukudi and Tirunelveli lies within 300 km from Dharmapuri. Cities from neighboring states like Bangalore, Mysore, Tumkur, Chittoor, Tirupathi, Thrissur, Palakkad, Salem, Puducherry also lie within a 300 km radius. Dharmapuri is located on a geographically important area in South India.

== Climate ==
Dharmapuri has a tropical wet and dry climate (Köppen Aw). The summer period of March, April, May, and June is sweltering and dry, reaching a maximum temperature of up to 38 °C or 100.4 °F. The temperatures drop in December and the low temperatures continue up to February, touching a minimum of 14 °C or 57.2 °F in January. The district has an average annual rainfall of 910 millimetres or 35.83 inches. The tropical forests here generally have short shrubs and thorned plants.

Climate data for Dharmapuri (1991–2020, extremes 1975–2020)
| Month | Jan | Feb | Mar | Apr | May | Jun | Jul | Aug | Sep | Oct | Nov | Dec | Year |
|---|---|---|---|---|---|---|---|---|---|---|---|---|---|
| Record high °C (°F) | 34.7 (94.5) | 38.5 (101.3) | 40.2 (104.4) | 41.0 (105.8) | 41.4 (106.5) | 40.0 (104.0) | 41.0 (105.8) | 38.0 (100.4) | 37.6 (99.7) | 35.5 (95.9) | 33.8 (92.8) | 33.8 (92.8) | 41.4 (106.5) |
| Mean daily maximum °C (°F) | 29.7 (85.5) | 32.7 (90.9) | 35.8 (96.4) | 36.8 (98.2) | 36.5 (97.7) | 34.2 (93.6) | 33.2 (91.8) | 32.5 (90.5) | 32.3 (90.1) | 30.7 (87.3) | 29.0 (84.2) | 27.9 (82.2) | 32.7 (90.9) |
| Mean daily minimum °C (°F) | 17.7 (63.9) | 18.9 (66.0) | 20.8 (69.4) | 23.8 (74.8) | 24.5 (76.1) | 23.9 (75.0) | 23.4 (74.1) | 23.1 (73.6) | 22.6 (72.7) | 21.9 (71.4) | 20.4 (68.7) | 18.3 (64.9) | 21.6 (70.9) |
| Record low °C (°F) | 10.6 (51.1) | 11.0 (51.8) | 14.2 (57.6) | 17.0 (62.6) | 18.2 (64.8) | 19.4 (66.9) | 18.9 (66.0) | 15.5 (59.9) | 17.7 (63.9) | 12.9 (55.2) | 13.0 (55.4) | 10.9 (51.6) | 10.6 (51.1) |
| Average rainfall mm (inches) | 2.6 (0.10) | 2.3 (0.09) | 16.4 (0.65) | 52.9 (2.08) | 120.3 (4.74) | 71.8 (2.83) | 73.9 (2.91) | 113.9 (4.48) | 143.5 (5.65) | 193.2 (7.61) | 110.9 (4.37) | 40.3 (1.59) | 942 (37.1) |
| Average rainy days | 0.3 | 0.2 | 0.9 | 2.8 | 6.6 | 3.9 | 4.1 | 6.2 | 7.0 | 9.7 | 6.5 | 2.7 | 50.8 |
| Average relative humidity (%) (at 17:30 IST) | 50 | 41 | 33 | 38 | 48 | 52 | 56 | 58 | 61 | 71 | 69 | 62 | 53 |
Source: India Meteorological Department

== Demographics ==
Historical population
| Year | Pop. | ±% |
|---|---|---|
| 1941 | 11,678 | — |
| 1951 | 24,094 | +106.3% |
| 1961 | | — |
| 1971 | | — |
| 1981 | | — |
| 1991 | 59,318 | — |
| 2001 | 64,496 | +8.7% |
| 2011 | 68,619 | +6.4% |
| 2017 | 113,218 | +65.0% |

Religious census
| Religion | Percent(%) |
| Hindu | 88.99% |
| Muslim | 9.65% |
| Christian | 0.99% |
| Sikh | 0.02% |
| Buddhist | 0.01% |
| Jain | 0.01% |
| Other | 0.33% |

According to the 2017 census, Dharmapuri had a population of 113,218 with a sex-ratio of 1,013 females for every 1,000 males, much above the national average of 929. A total of 6,759 were under the age of six, constituting 3,470 males and 3,289 females. Scheduled Castes and Scheduled Tribes accounted for 6.92% and 0.14% of the population respectively. The average literacy of the town was 77.08%, compared to the national average of 72.99%. The town had a total of 17,136 households. There were a total of 26,943 workers, comprising 606 cultivators, 427 main agricultural laborers, 1,052 in household industries, 22,566 other workers, 2,292 marginal workers, 54 marginal cultivators, 77 marginal agricultural laborers, 213 marginal workers in household industries and 1,948 other marginal workers.

As per the religious census of 2011, Dharmapuri (M) had 88.99% Hindus, 9.65% Muslims, 0.99% Christians, 0.02% Sikhs, 0.01% Buddhists, 0.01% Jains and 0.33% following other religions.

== Politics ==
It is part of the Dharmapuri Assembly constituency and Dharmapuri Lok Sabha constituency. The Member of Lok Sabha is A. Mani.

== Transport ==
=== Roadways ===
Dharmapuri is well connected by major National highway NH-44. Commonly called north–south corridor which originates from Srinagar and terminates at Kanyakumari passes through the district. Another highway it encompasses is NH-844 which originates from Adhiyamankottai in Dharmapuri and terminates at Neraluru village near Chandrapura, Bengaluru. State highways like SH-60 (Hogenakkal-Pennagaram-Dharmapuri-Tirupattur), & SH-60A(Dharmapuri-Harur) via Morappur also passes through the city. The Dharmapuri-Harur section and Thanipadi-Thiruvannamalai section of SH-60A is currently being widened to four lane roads providing an alternative route to major cities like Puducherry and Villupuram via Thiruvannamalai from Dharmapuri.

Local and long-distance buses stop there. Tamil Nadu State Transport Corporation, Karnataka, Kerala and Andhra Pradesh State Road Transport Corporation buses operate there.

=== Railways ===
Dharmapuri railway station (DPJ) is situated 1.6 kilometer from Dharmapuri bus stand. The station was fractured to South Western Railways when they reformed it. Now it is under the Bangalore railway division. The railway station currently has one functional line, the Bengaluru–Dharmapuri–Salem line. The other line, Dharmapuri–Morappur line, which was constructed in 1907 functioned for about 38 years and was removed by the Indian government. However again the line is under construction with electrification due to the necessity of the people in the district. This new line will connect the people of Dharmapuri district to Chennai directly. As well as this line is the alternative route for Bangalore–Chennai (via Dharmapuri). Dharmapuri has two more important railway stations viz. Morappur (MAP) and Bommidi (BQI) which comes under Southern Railway Salem Division. These stations connects Chennai and Coimbatore through Katpadi, Jolarpettai, Salem, Erode Junctions,

=== Airways ===
The nearest airport, Salem airport, is located in Salem at a distance of 45 kilometres (28 mi) and nearest International airport is Kempegowda International Airport, located in Devanahalli, near Bengaluru (Bangalore), at a distance of 155 kilometres (96 mi).

== Notable people ==
- K. P. Anbalagan Politician
- R. Senthil Politician
- S. Senthilkumar (politician)
- Udaykumar Indian actor and producer

== See also ==
- Dharmapuri (Lok Sabha constituency)
- Dharmapuri railway station
