= P. D. Elangovan =

Indian politician

P.D.Elangovan

Member of Parliament, Lok Sabha
- In office 6 October 1999 — 17 May 2004
- Preceded by: K. Pary Mohan
- Succeeded by: R. Senthil
- Constituency: Dharmapuri

Personal details
- Born: 3 May 1953 (age 73) Pudupoolamedu, Cuddalore district, Madras State, India
- Party: Pattali Makkal Katchi
- Other political affiliations: All India Anna Dravida Munnetra Kazhagam
- Spouse: Maithily
- Children: 1 daughter

Pudupoolamedu D. Elangovan is an Indian politician. He was elected to the Lok Sabha, the lower house of Indian Parliament, from Dharmapuri in 1999 as a member of the Pattali Makkal Katchi. He later joined the Bharatiya Janata Party.
