= Anbumani Ramadoss =

Indian politician (born 1968)

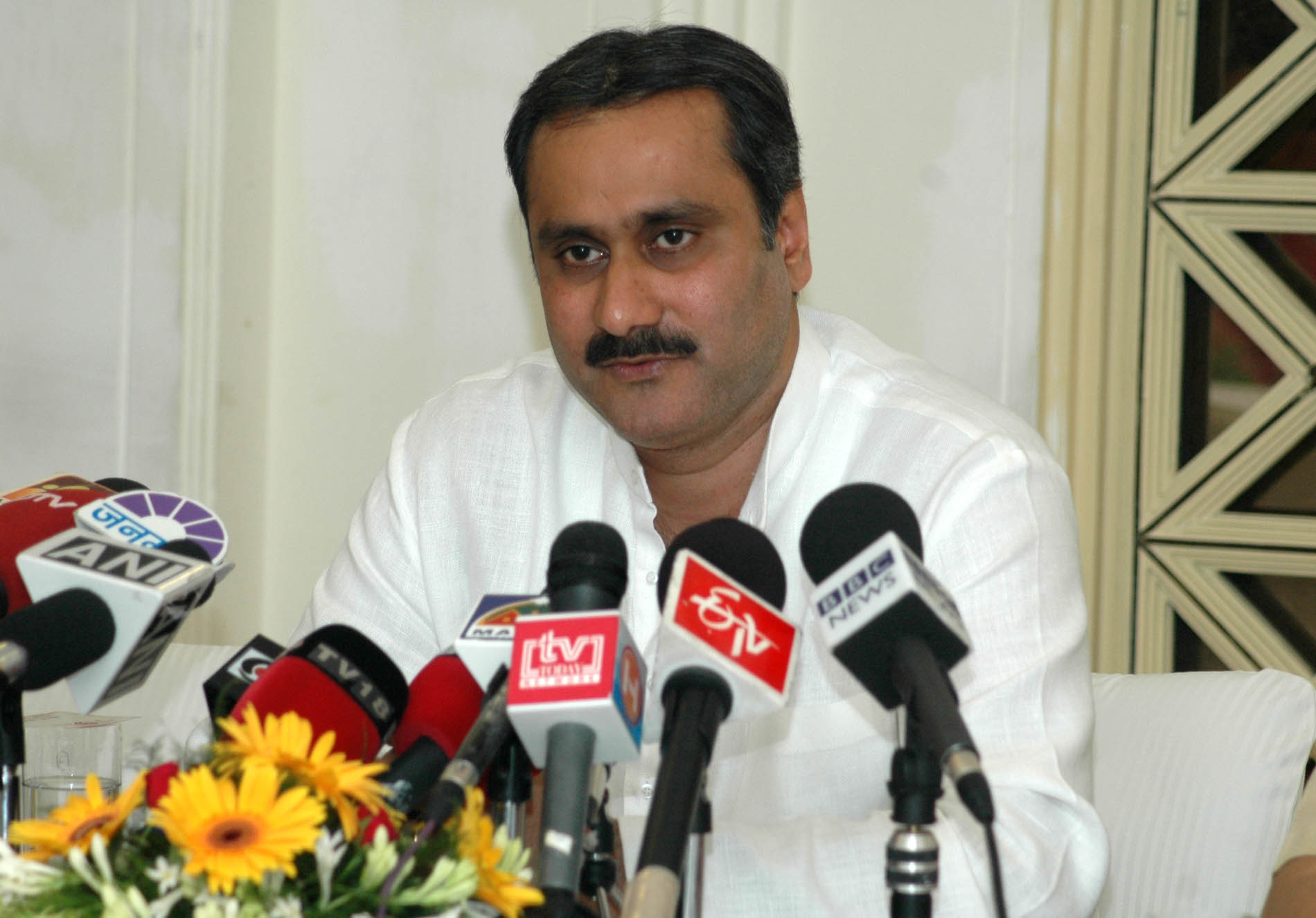
- Anbumani in 2007

Member of Parliament, Rajya Sabha
- Incumbent
- Assumed office 3 April 2026
- Preceded by: G. K. Vasan
- Constituency: Tamil Nadu
- In office 25 July 2019 – 24 July 2025
- Preceded by: R. Lakshmanan
- Succeeded by: I. S. Inbadurai
- Constituency: Tamil Nadu
- In office 30 June 2004 – 29 June 2010
- Preceded by: S. Sivasubramanian
- Succeeded by: T. M. Selvaganapathy
- Constituency: Tamil Nadu

Minister of Health and Family Welfare
- In office 22 May 2004 – 29 March 2009
- Prime Minister: Manmohan Singh
- Preceded by: Sushma Swaraj
- Succeeded by: Ghulam Nabi Azad

Member of Parliament, Lok Sabha
- In office 16 May 2014 – 23 May 2019
- Preceded by: R. Thamaraiselvan
- Succeeded by: S. Senthilkumar
- Constituency: Dharmapuri, Tamil Nadu
- Majority: 77,146

President of Pattali Makkal Katchi
- Incumbent
- Assumed office 28 May 2022
- General Secretary: Vadivel Ravanan
- Honorary President: G. K. Mani
- Preceded by: G. K. Mani

Youth Wing President of Pattali Makkal Katchi
- In office 7 August 2006 – 28 May 2022
- President: G. K. Mani
- Succeeded by: G. K. M. Tamil Kumaran

Personal details
- Born: 9 October 1968 (age 57) Puducherry, India
- Party: Pattali Makkal Katchi
- Spouse: Sowmiya (m. 1991)
- Children: 3 (daughters)
- Parent: S. Ramadoss (father)
- Education: Madras Medical College (MBBS)
- Occupation: Politician
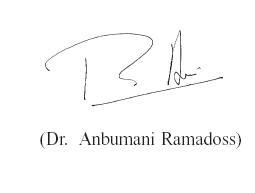
- Signature
- Website: www.anbumani4cm.com

Anbumani Ramadoss (born 9 October 1968) is an Indian politician from Tamil Nadu. He is a member of the Rajya Sabha, the upper house of the Parliament of India and was the Minister of Health and Family Welfare in the First Manmohan Singh ministry from (2004–2009) as a part of the UPA government. He was elected to the Lok Sabha, the lower house of the Parliament of India from Dharmapuri, Tamil Nadu. He is the president of Pattali Makkal Katchi, a political party in Tamil Nadu.

== Early life and education ==
Anbumani Ramadoss was born on 9 October 1968 at Puducherry to S. Ramadoss and R. Saraswathi. His father was a physician by profession and founded the Pattali Makkal Katchi in 1989. Anbumani completed his SSLC from Montfort Boys Higher Secondary School, Yercaud in 1984 and finished his higher secondary in 1986 from St. Ann's Higher Secondary School, Tindivanam. He completed his MBBS from Madras Medical College. He worked for a year and a half as a medical practitioner at Nallalam, a small village near Tindivanam. In 2003, Anbumani did a course on macro-economics from the London School of Economics.

== Political career ==
Ramadoss joined Pattali Makkal Katchi and became the youth wing president. In 2004, he became a member of the Rajya Sabha.

From	To	Position / Role
22 May 2004	29 March 2009	Union Minister of Health and Family Welfare, Government of India
30 June 2004	29 June 2010	Elected to Rajya Sabha (First Term)
2014	2019	Member, Sixteenth Lok Sabha; Member, Committee on Absence of Members from the Sittings of the House; Member, Standing Committee on Rural Development; Member, Consultative Committee, Ministry of Home Affairs
25 July 2019	24 July 2025	Elected to Rajya Sahba (second term); Member, Committee on Consumer Affairs, Food, and Public Distribution (Sept. 2019 - Nov. 2023); Member, Consultative Committee for the Ministry of Health and Family Welfare (Sept. 2019 - June 2024); Member, Committee on Water Resources (Nov. 2023 - June 2024); Member, Committee on Chemicals and Fertilizers (Sept. 2024 - July 2025); Member, Committee on Papers Laid on the Table (Oct. 2024 - July 2025)
3 April 2026	2 April 2032	Elected to Rajya Sabha (third term); Member, Consultative Committee for the Ministry of Railways

=== Minister of Health and Family Welfare ===
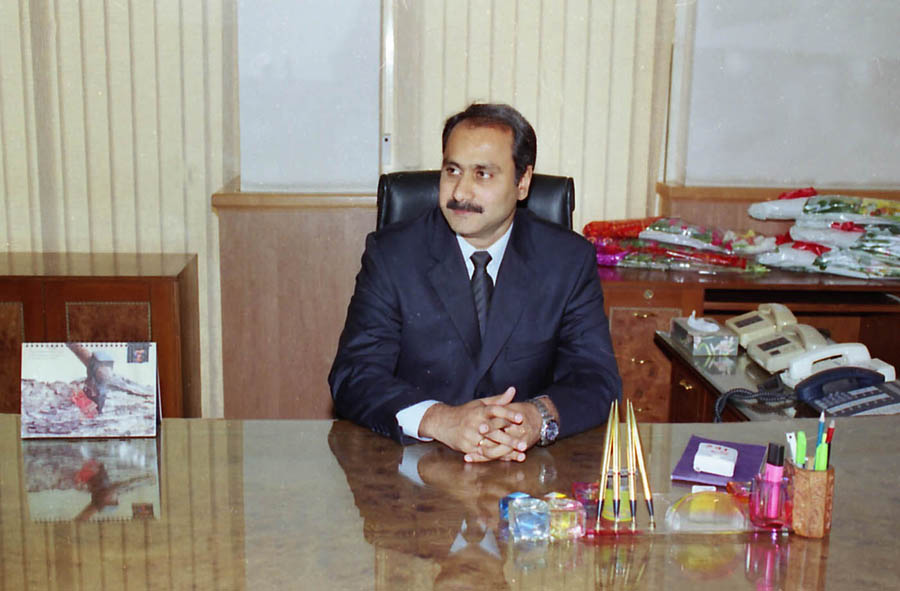
Anbumani Ramdoss assumes the charge of the Union Minister for Health & Family Welfare in New Delhi on 25 May 2004

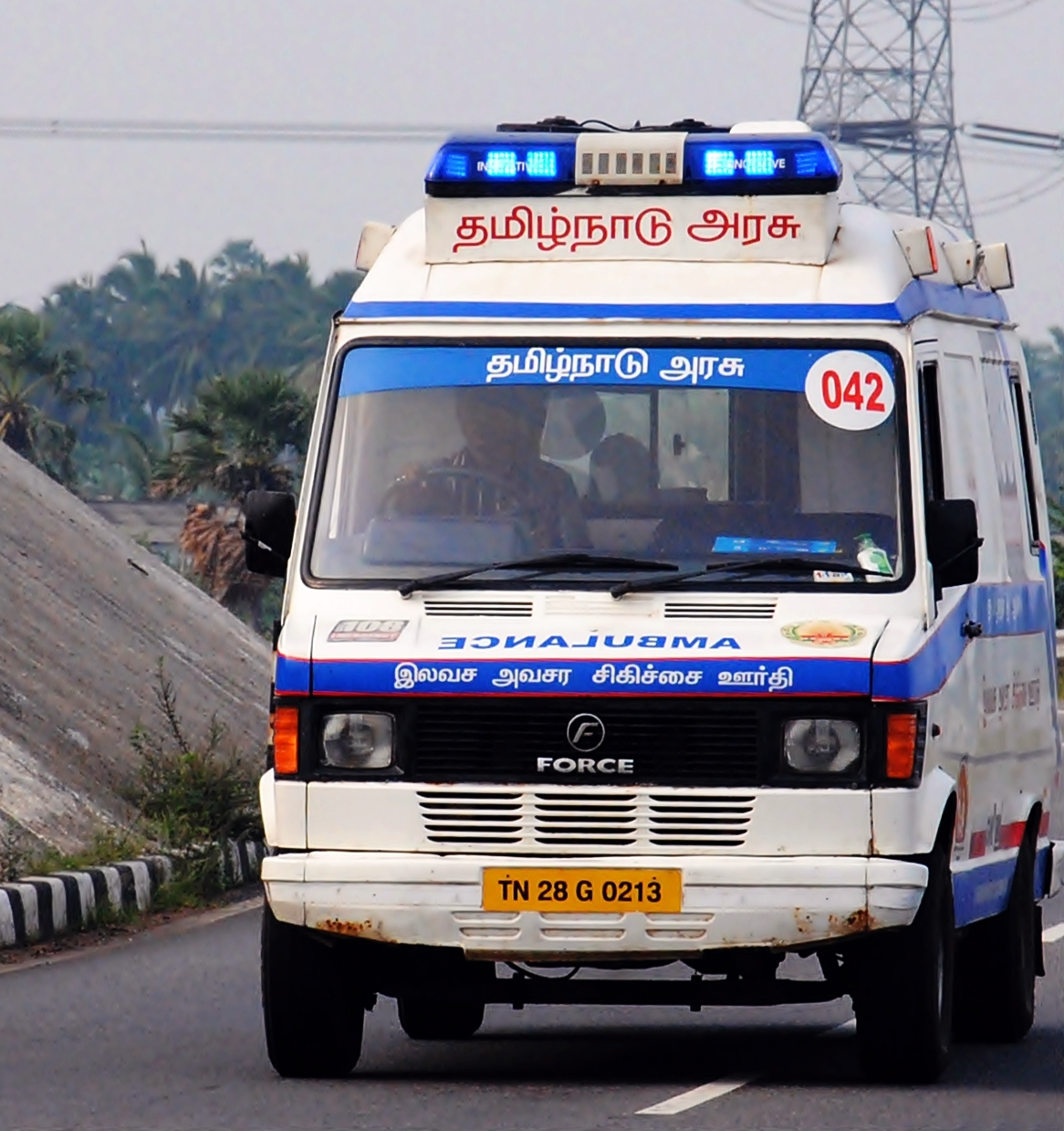
The 108 Ambulance Service was introduced during his tenure

On 22 May 2004, Anbumani became as the Union Minister of Health and Family Welfare of the Government of India. At the time of induction into the Manmohan Singh's 2004 cabinet, Anbumani was the youngest Cabinet Minister in the Union Cabinet. During his tenure, the ministry set up various institutions like the Public Health Foundation of India, Department of Health Research, National Institute of Communicable Diseases, Food Safety and Standards Authority of India and the Traditional Knowledge Digital Library. As the Union Health Minister, Anbumani established the National Rural Health Mission (NRHM) in 2005 to provide primary health care to the women and children living in the rural parts of India. The project was lauded as 'the largest successful health scheme to be implemented anywhere in the world' by economist Jeffrey Sachs.

Under Anbumani, the ministry of health brought stringent regulations against the sale of tobacco products. Anbumani initiated a National Alcohol Policy for the first time in India and advocated for 2 October, the birthday of Mahatma Gandhi to be observed as World No-Alcohol day. Anbumani along with T D Dogra, the then Director of All India Institute of Medical Sciences (AIIMS), New Delhi expanded the institution to Jhajjar district, Haryana.

=== Member of Parliament ===
He became a Member of Parliament from Dharmapuri Lok Sabha Constituency in 2014 as a part of the NDA with Bharatiya Janata Party. On 6 October 2015, Anbumani offered to quit the NDA if his decision could help find a permanent solution to the problems of the Sri Lankan Tamils.

Anbumani has the worst attendance of 15% among those from Tamil Nadu in both Houses as a Rajya Sabha MP as of December 2019.

== Elections ==
=== Lok Sabha elections ===
Elections	Constituency	Party	Result	Votes Polled	% Votes
2014	Dharmapuri	PMK	Won	4,68,194	42.46%
2019	Dharmapuri	PMK	Lost	5,04,235	41.18%

=== Tamil Nadu Legislative elections ===
Elections	Constituency	Party	Result	Votes Polled	% Votes
2016	Pennagaram	PMK	Lost	58,402	29.25%

=== Rajya Sabha ===
Position	Party	Constituency	From	To	Tenure
Member of Parliament, Rajya Sabha (1st Term)	PMK	Tamil Nadu	30 June 2004	29 June 2010	5 years, 364 days
Member of Parliament, Rajya Sabha (2nd Term)	PMK	Tamil Nadu	25 July 2019	24 July 2025	5 years, 364 days
Member of Parliament, Rajya Sabha (3rd Term)	PMK	Tamil Nadu	3 April 2026	2 April 2032	5 years, 365 days

==== State assembly elections ====
Anbumani was declared as the Chief Ministerial Candidate from PMK for the 2016 Tamil Nadu Legislative Assembly elections. He contested from Pennagaram and lost by 18,446 votes.

During his campaign in Kancheepuram in 2019 he told cadres that it is only they who will be in the polling booths. He said to his party members “We will only be there. Then what? Do I need to say it out loud? You understood, right? That’s all, it’s done. Both of them have won.” The Thiruporur police in April 2019 initiated steps for registering cases against Anbumani Ramadoss for allegedly hinting at booth-capturing by his coalition parties to ensure success of their candidates in the 18 April elections.

== Controversies ==
=== Arrest for hate speech ===
Anbumani Ramadoss was arrested by Kancheepuram police in May 2013 in connection with an alleged hate speech case filed against him, the previous year. PMK workers set at least three buses on fire, and damaged over a hundred government buses by stone pelting. The police detained about 4,000 PMK workers around the state.

=== FIR on promoting caste enmity ===
In March 2014, the Dharmapuri Police filed FIR on Anbumani Ramadoss and two others on charges of circulating CDs containing video/audio clips containing speeches by his father S Ramadoss and others on Marakkanam violence and Dharmapuri violence that could promote violence and hostility between two groups. A case against Ramdoss together with the PMK Deputy Secretary General and PMK District Secretary was registered under IPC sections relating to offenses including promoting hatred among various groups and issuing statements leading to public misbehavior and breaching Model Code of Conduct.

== Awards and honours ==
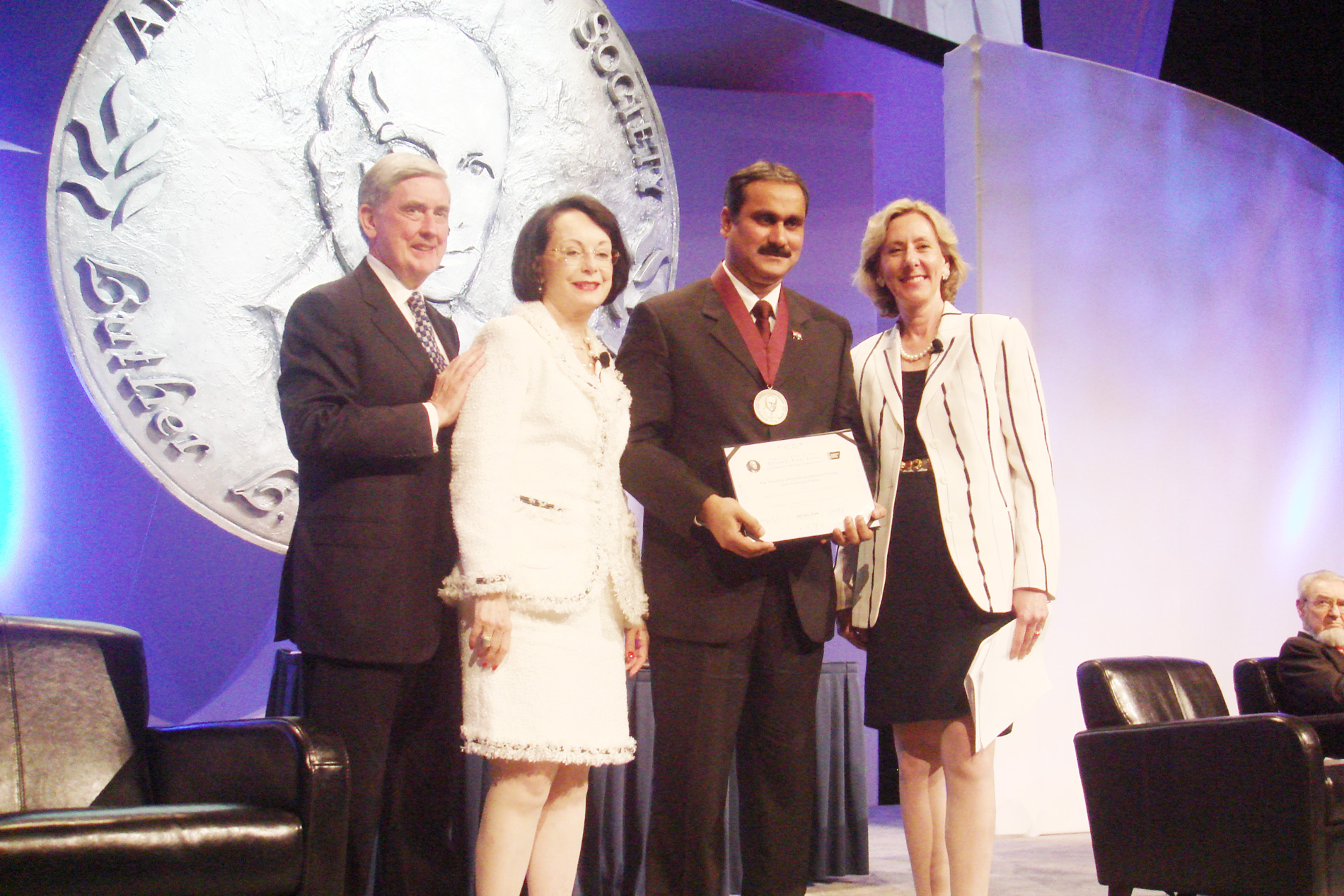
Anbumani Ramadoss receives the Luther L. Terry Award

The Secretary-General of the United Nations, Ban Ki-moon, described him as a "public health champion". The President of India, Pranab Mukherjee, presented him with a memento of appreciation on 29 March 2014 at the inauguration of Rotary International's Polio-Free Conclave 2014 in New Delhi. He was awarded with the Luther L. Terry Award by the American Cancer Society in 2006. He received the World Health Organization Director General's Special Award for Leadership and Special Award for tobacco control in 2007. Rotary International awarded Polio Eradication Champion Award in 2007.

== Personal life ==
Anbumani is married to Sowmiya and has three daughters. Anbumani heads a NGO Pasumai Thaayagam, which was founded in 1995 by his father S. Ramadoss. The NGO focuses on planting trees, desilting lakes and building check dams to conserve water. It also advocates for the welfare of Sri Lankan Tamils. He is currently the President of the Tamil Nadu Badminton Association.

Lok Sabha
Preceded by R. Thamaraiselvan	Member of Parliament for Dharmapuri; 2014–2019	Succeeded by Dr. S. Senthil Kumar
Political offices
Preceded by Sushma Swaraj	Minister of Health and Family Welfare; May 2004 – April 2009	Succeeded by Ghulam Nabi Azad
