= Dharmapuri Lok Sabha constituency =

Parliamentary constituency in Tamil Nadu, India

Coordinates: 12.1260°N 78.154°E

Dharmapuri
- Lok Sabha constituency
- Interactive map of Dharmapuri Loksabha constituency, post-2008 delimitation

Constituency details
- Country: India
- Region: South India
- State: Tamil Nadu
- Assembly constituencies: Palacode; Pennagaram; Dharmapuri; Pappireddippatti; Harur; Mettur
- Established: 1977
- Total electors: 14,84,027

Member of Parliament
- 18th Lok Sabha
- Incumbent Dr. A. Mani
- Party: DMK
- Alliance: None
- Elected year: 2024

Dharmapuri is a Lok Sabha constituency in Tamil Nadu, India. Its Tamil Nadu Parliamentary Constituency number is 10 of 39. It includes 6 Assembly constituencies: Dharmapuri, Harur, Mettur, Palacodu, Pappireddippatti and Pennagaram.

== Assembly segments ==
=== 2009-present ===
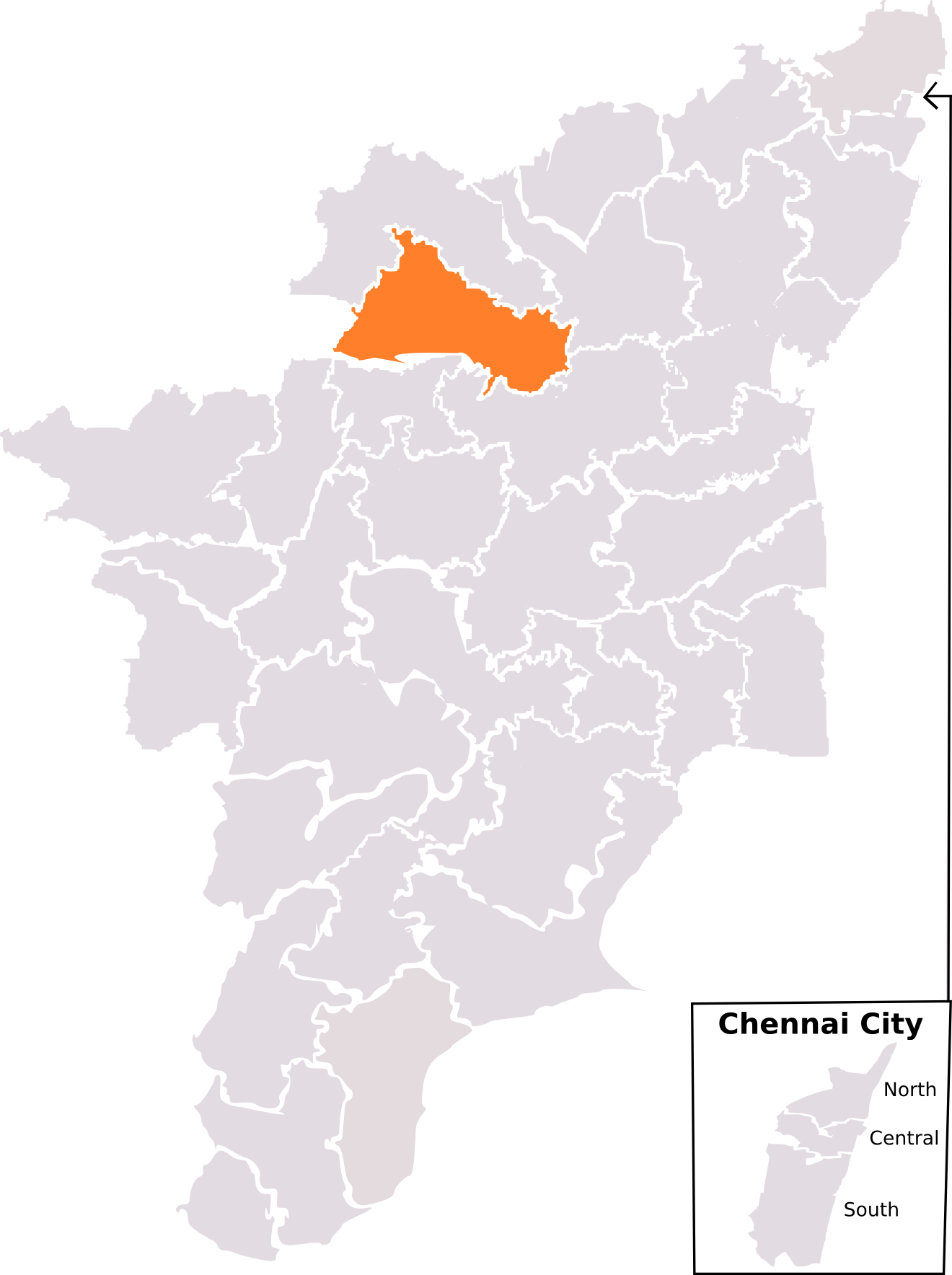
Dharmapuri constituency as laid out by 2008 Delimitation

Constituency number	Name	Reserved for (SC/ST/None)	District	Party	2024 Lead
57	Palacode	None	Dharmapuri	AIADMK	DMK
58	Pennagaram	None	Dharmapuri	TVK	PMK
59	Dharmapuri	None	Dharmapuri	PMK	PMK
60	Pappireddippatti	None	Dharmapuri	AIADMK	PMK
61	Harur	SC	Dharmapuri	AIADMK	DMK
85	Mettur	None	Salem	AIADMK	DMK

=== Before 2009 ===
1. Harur (SC)
2. Morappur (defunct)
3. Dharmapuri
4. Pennagaram
5. Mettur
6. Taramangalam (defunct)

== Members of the Parliament ==
Year	Winner	Party
1977	Vazhappady K. Ramamurthy	Indian National Congress
1980	K. Arjunan	Dravida Munnetra Kazhagam
1984	M. Thambi Durai	All India Anna Dravida Munnetra Kazhagam
1989	M. G. Sekhar	All India Anna Dravida Munnetra Kazhagam
1991	K. V. Thanga Balu	Indian National Congress
1996	P. Theertharaman	Tamil Maanila Congress
1998	K. Pary Mohan	Pattali Makkal Katchi
1999	P.D. Elangovan	Pattali Makkal Katchi
2004	R. Senthil	Pattali Makkal Katchi
2009	R. Thamaraiselvan	Dravida Munnetra Kazhagam
2014	Anbumani Ramadoss	Pattali Makkal Katchi
2019	Dr. S. Senthil Kumar	Dravida Munnetra Kazhagam
2024	A. Mani	Dravida Munnetra Kazhagam

== Election results ==
Vote share of Winning candidates
2024	34.67%
2019	47.43%
2014	43.01%
2009	47.05%
2004	55.99%
1999	47.52%
1998	55.04%
1996	42.65%
1991	51.17%
1989	46.52%
1984	63.33%
1980	55.55%
1977	60.25%
1951	35.69%

=== General Elections 2024 ===
2024 Indian general election: Dharmapuri
Party	Candidate	Votes	%	±%
DMK	Dr. A. Mani	432,667	34.67	▼6.51
PMK	A. Soumiya	411,367	32.97	▼12.29
AIADMK	R. Ashokan	293,629	23.53	
NOTA	None of the above	9,198	0.74	▼0.35
Margin of victory		21,300	1.71	▼4.07
Turnout		1,247,832	81.20	▼1.21
Registered electors		1,524,896		
DMK hold		Swing		

=== General Elections 2019 ===
2019 Indian general election: Dharmapuri
Party	Candidate	Votes	%	±%
DMK	Dr. S. Senthilkumar	574,988	46.96%	30.61%
PMK	Anbumani Ramadoss	5,04,235	41.18%	
Independent	P. Palaniappan	53,655	4.38%	
MNM	D. Rajasekar	15,614	1.28%	
NOTA	None Of The Above	13,379	1.09%	−0.06%
Independent	Dr. S. Elango	10,830	0.88%	
GPI	K. Annadhurai	9,017	0.74%	
BSP	C. Sivanandham	6,012	0.49%	−0.25%
Margin of victory		70,753	5.78%	−1.22%
Turnout		12,24,465	82.41%	1.23%
Registered electors		14,85,804		
DMK gain from PMK		Swing	4.50%	

=== General Elections 2014 ===
2014 Indian general election: Dharmapuri
Party	Candidate	Votes	%	±%
PMK	Anbumani Ramadoss	468,194	42.46%	
AIADMK	P. S. Mohan	3,91,048	35.46%	
DMK	R. Thamaraiselvan	1,80,297	16.35%	−30.70%
INC	Rama Suganthan	15,455	1.40%	
NOTA	None Of The Above	12,693	1.15%	
BSP	S. Rajinikanth	8,180	0.74%	0.04%
Independent	Dr. K. Padmarajan	4,934	0.45%	
Margin of victory		77,146	7.00%	−10.49%
Turnout		11,02,703	81.18%	8.49%
Registered electors		13,58,273		
PMK gain from DMK		Swing	-4.59%	

=== General Elections 2009 ===
2009 Indian general election: Dharmapuri
Party	Candidate	Votes	%	±%
DMK	R. Thamaraiselvan	365,812	47.05%	
PMK	Dr. R. Senthil	2,29,870	29.56%	
DMDK	V. Elangovan	1,03,494	13.31%	
KNMK	G. Asokan	15,333	1.97%	
Independent	A. Raja	10,561	1.36%	
Independent	R. Mani	9,982	1.28%	
Independent	Dr. K. Padmarajan	5,571	0.72%	
BSP	V. Purusothaman	5,445	0.70%	−0.18%
Margin of victory		1,35,942	17.48%	−12.95%
Turnout		10,69,601	72.69%	17.89%
Registered electors		7,77,512		
DMK gain from PMK		Swing	-8.94%	

=== General Elections 2004 ===
2004 Indian general election: Dharmapuri
Party	Candidate	Votes	%	±%
PMK	Dr. R. Senthil	397,540	55.99%	
BJP	P. D. Elangovan	1,81,450	25.56%	
JD(U)	M. Munusamy (Alais) Thamilselvan	62,960	8.87%	
TNP	M. Balasubramaniam	23,553	3.32%	
Independent	V. P. Jaganathan	10,968	1.54%	
Independent	D. Mahendran	10,370	1.46%	
BSP	Kannan Kaliru	6,220	0.88%	
Independent	Dr. K. Padmarajan	5,161	0.73%	
Margin of victory		2,16,090	30.44%	26.87%
Turnout		7,09,991	54.80%	−4.61%
Rejected ballots		76	0.01%	
Registered electors		12,95,521		
PMK hold		Swing	8.47%	

=== General Elections 1999 ===
1999 Indian general election: Dharmapuri
Party	Candidate	Votes	%	±%
PMK	P. D. Elangovan	340,162	47.52%	
AIADMK	K. P. Munusamy	3,14,622	43.96%	
TMC(M)	M. C. Rajendran	26,681	3.73%	
Independent	V. Appavu Chetty	20,125	2.81%	
TNP	C. Selvam	12,215	1.71%	
Margin of victory		25,540	3.57%	−12.44%
Turnout		7,15,771	59.42%	−6.42%
Registered electors		12,26,879		4.39%
PMK gain from TMC(M)		Swing	4.87%	

=== General Elections 1998 ===
1998 Indian general election: Dharmapuri
Party	Candidate	Votes	%	±%
PMK	K. Pary Mohan	341,917	55.04%	
TMC(M)	P. Theertharaman	2,42,490	39.03%	
Independent	P. Venkatesan	14,788	2.38%	
UCPI	P. K. Pattabiraman	10,018	1.61%	
BSP	C. Jayaseelan	5,693	0.92%	
RJD	A. Gopal Inamurasu	3,185	0.51%	
Margin of victory		99,427	16.00%	−2.83%
Turnout		6,21,241	54.42%	−11.41%
Registered electors		11,75,234		
PMK gain from TMC(M)		Swing	12.38%	

=== General Elections 1996 ===
1996 Indian general election: Dharmapuri
Party	Candidate	Votes	%	±%
TMC(M)	P. Theertharaman	297,166	42.65%	
INC	M. P. Subramaniyam	1,65,920	23.82%	−27.36%
AIIC(T)	K. Ramamurthy	1,63,484	23.47%	
MDMK	P. Krishnan	28,633	4.11%	
Independent	C. Chinnasamy	12,495	1.79%	
Independent	A. Gopal Inamurasu	8,283	1.19%	
BJP	P. S. Arumugam	6,060	0.87%	
Margin of victory		1,31,246	18.84%	−5.07%
Turnout		6,96,696	65.83%	0.86%
Registered electors		11,22,427		
TMC(M) gain from INC		Swing	-8.52%	

=== General Elections 1991 ===
1991 Indian general election: Dharmapuri
Party	Candidate	Votes	%	±%
INC	K. V. Thangkabalu	322,138	51.17%	
PMK	P. D. Elangovan	1,71,649	27.27%	
DMK	M. Kandasamy	1,25,365	19.91%	−2.80%
THMM	M. Annamalai	3,055	0.49%	
Margin of victory		1,50,489	23.90%	7.26%
Turnout		6,29,532	64.98%	−3.53%
Registered electors		10,05,354		
INC gain from AIADMK		Swing	4.65%	

=== General Elections 1989 ===
1989 Indian general election: Dharmapuri
Party	Candidate	Votes	%	±%
AIADMK	M. G. Sekhar	315,921	46.52%	−16.81%
PMK	P. D. Elangovan	2,02,901	29.88%	
DMK	M. Kandasamy	1,54,220	22.71%	
Margin of victory		1,13,020	16.64%	−12.09%
Turnout		6,79,098	68.51%	−2.23%
Registered electors		10,08,221		
AIADMK hold		Swing	-16.81%	

=== General Elections 1984 ===
1984 Indian general election: Dharmapuri
Party	Candidate	Votes	%	±%
AIADMK	M. Thambidurai	333,427	63.33%	
CPI	Parvathi Krishnan	1,82,175	34.60%	
Independent	P. V. Devakumarvarma	10,854	2.06%	
Margin of victory		1,51,252	28.73%	11.01%
Turnout		5,26,456	70.74%	15.32%
Registered electors		7,80,371		
AIADMK gain from DMK		Swing	7.79%	

=== General Elections 1980 ===
1980 Indian general election: Dharmapuri
Party	Candidate	Votes	%	±%
DMK	K. Arjunan	209,603	55.55%	
JP	G. Bhuvarahan	1,42,732	37.83%	
JP(S)	K. Nallasamy	13,794	3.66%	
Independent	C. Ganesan	5,020	1.33%	
Independent	Kandhan	2,525	0.67%	
Independent	Thangaraj	2,188	0.58%	
Margin of victory		66,871	17.72%	−8.82%
Turnout		3,77,330	55.42%	−9.29%
Registered electors		6,94,088		
DMK gain from INC		Swing	-4.70%	

=== General Elections 1977 ===
1977 Indian general election: Dharmapuri
Party	Candidate	Votes	%	±%
INC	Vazhappady K. Ramamurthy	239,908	60.25%	
INC(O)	P. Ponnuswami	1,34,222	33.71%	
Independent	P. Kalianna Gounder	19,034	4.78%	
Independent	T. V. Anganna Chettiar	4,999	1.26%	
Margin of victory		1,05,686	26.54%	
Turnout		3,98,163	64.70%	
Registered electors		6,31,245		
INC win (new seat)				

=== General Elections 1951 ===
1951–52 Indian general election: Dharmapuri
Party	Candidate	Votes	%	±%
Independent	N. Satyanathan	66,216	35.69%	
INC	K. Subramanian	61,570	33.18%	33.18%
Independent	R. K. Gurunatha Chettiar	34,432	18.56%	
Independent	M. C. Natesa Chettiar	23,327	12.57%	
Margin of victory		4,646	2.50%	
Turnout		1,85,545	51.53%	
Registered electors		3,60,076		
Independent win (new seat)				

== See also ==
- Dharmapuri
- List of constituencies of the Lok Sabha
