= S. Senthilkumar (Dharmapuri politician) =

Indian politician

Member of Parliament, Lok Sabha
- In office 23 May 2019 – 4 June 2024
- Preceded by: Anbumani Ramadoss
- Succeeded by: A. Mani
- Constituency: Dharmapuri

Personal details
- Born: 22 June 1977 (age 49) Dharmapuri
- Party: DMK
- Spouse: Shobana
- Relations: DN Vadivelu (grand father)
- Parent: V. Selvaraj (father)
- Profession: Doctor, politician

Selvaraj Senthilkumar (born 22 June 1977) is an Indian politician known. He was elected to the Lok Sabha, lower house of the Parliament of India from Dharmapuri, Tamil Nadu in the 2019 Indian general election as member of the Dravida Munnetra Kazhagam.

== Controversy ==
Known for referring to Hindi-Heartland states as 'Gaumutra states' in a critical manner during discussions in the Lok Sabha, later he withdrew this comments and clarified that they were misinterpreted and taken out of context

== Family and education ==
He completed his MBBS from Annamalai University, Chidambaram in January 2002. Then he completed his MD (RD) from Sri Ramachandra Medical College and Research Institute, Sri Ramachandra University in June 2016. His grandfather DN Vadivelu Gounder was INC MLA in 1965.

== 2019 Lok Sabha ==
He contested in 2019 Lok Sabha election from Dharmapuri constituency and won with margin of 70,753 votes more than Pattali Makkal Katchi candidate Anbumani Ramadoss.
