= R. Senthil =

Indian politician

Dr. R.Senthil

Member of Parliament
- Constituency: Dharmapuri

Personal details
- Born: 2 June 1962 (age 63) மாக்கனூர், Tamil Nadu
- Party: PMK
- Spouse: V. Thangam
- Children: 1 son and 2 daughters
- As of 22 September, 2006

Dr. R. Senthil (born 2 June 1962) is an Indian politician affiliated to the Pattali Makkal Katchi. He is running a hospital named Thangam Hospital in Dharmapuri which specialises in treating kidney stones. He was a member of the 14th Lok Sabha representing the Dharmapuri (Lok Sabha constituency) from 2004 to 2009.
