= G. Vaithilingam =

Indian politician

Member of the Tamil Nadu Legislative Assembly
- Incumbent
- Assumed office 11 May 2026
- Preceded by: Ka. So. Ka. Kannan
- Constituency: Jayankondam

Personal details
- Party: Pattali Makkal Katchi
- Relations: Kaduvetti Guru (Brother)
- Parent: Thiru Ganesan (father)
- Occupation: Politician, Agriculturalist and Business Activities

Ganesan Vaithilingam, also known as Ka. Vaithi., is an Indian politician who is a Member of the 17th Legislative Assembly of Tamil Nadu. He was elected from Jayankondam as an Pattali Makkal Katchi candidate in 2026.

== Elections contested ==
2026 Tamil Nadu Legislative Assembly election: Jayankondam
Party	Candidate	Votes	%	±%
PMK	G. Vaithilingam	88,992	38.94	▼4.54
DMK	Ka. So. Ka. Kannan	70,502	30.85	▼15.15
TVK	G. Kavitha Rajendran	55,538	24.30	New
NTK	K. Revathi	6,192	2.71	▼1.89
Aanaithinthiya Jananayaka Pathukappu Kazhagam	N. Ravisankar	1,203	0.53	New
Independent	S. Chanthirasekar	984	0.43	New
Independent	C. Vinothsavariremijeas	792	0.35	New
Naadaalum Makkal Katchi	M. Ravanan	711	0.31	New
Independent	M. Sankar	608	0.27	New
Independent	R. Anandhakumar	583	0.26	New
Independent	G. Jayabalan	528	0.23	New
BSP	Chinnadurai S.	475	0.21	▼0.07
NOTA	NOTA	416	0.18	▼0.68
TVK	Pagutharivalan A.	269	0.12	New
Independent	Gurunathan N.	177	0.08	New
Independent	Kannan K.	158	0.07	New
Desiya Makkal Sakthi Katchi	Azhagesan V.R.	151	0.07	New
Independent	Isac Newtan J.	115	0.05	New
Independent	Vezhaventhan D.	100	0.04	New
Independent	Venkatajalapathi R.	54	0.02	New
Margin of victory		18,490	8.09	▲5.57
Turnout		2,28,548	86.62	▲5.36
Registered electors		2,63,862		▼2,406
PMK gain from DMK		Swing	▼4.54	
