= Rajendiran (Andimadam MLA) =

Indian politician

A. Rajendiran

Member of Tamil Nadu Legislative Assembly
- In office 10 May 1996 – 14 May 2001
- Chief Minister: M. Karunanidhi
- Preceded by: K. R. Thangaraju
- Succeeded by: Kaduvetti Guru
- Constituency: Andimadam constituency

President of Pattali Makkal Katchi
- In office 16 July 1989 – 31 December 1997
- Leader: S. Ramadoss
- Preceded by: position established
- Succeeded by: G. K. Mani

Personal details
- Party: Pattali Makkal Katchi (1989-97; 2019 - present)
- Other political affiliations: AIADMK (2013-18)
- Nickname: Dheeran

A. Rajendran is an Indian politician and former Member of the Legislative Assembly of Tamil Nadu. He was elected to the Tamil Nadu Legislative Assembly as a Pattali Makkal Katchi candidate from Andimadam constituency in 1996 election. He is also known as "Dheeran". He was the first president of Pattali Makkal Katchi, served from 1989 to 1997.

== Electoral Performance ==
| Elections | Constituency | Party | Result | Vote percentage | Opposition candidate | Opposition party | Opposition vote percentage |
|---|---|---|---|---|---|---|---|
| 1996 Tamil Nadu Legislative Assembly election | Andimadam | PMK | Won | 47.48 | Sivasubramaniyan | DMK | 34.72 |
| 2001 Tamil Nadu Legislative Assembly election | Gingee | DMK | Lost | 25.84 | V. Elumalai | AIADMK | 51.33 |
