= Salem North Assembly constituency =

State Legislative Assembly Constituency in Tamil Nadu

Coordinates: 11.71°N 78.14°E

Salem (North)
- Constituency No. 89 for the Tamil Nadu Legislative Assembly

Constituency details
- Country: India
- Region: South India
- State: Tamil Nadu
- District: Salem
- Lok Sabha constituency: Salem
- Established: 2008
- Total electors: 2,38,685

Member of Legislative Assembly
- 17th Tamil Nadu Legislative Assembly
- Incumbent Sivakumar. K
- Party: TVK
- Elected year: 2026

Salem North or 'Salem (North)' is one of the 234 assembly constituencies in the state of Tamil Nadu in southern India. Its State Assembly Constituency number is 89. It was created in 2008 when the previous constituencies, Salem I and Salem II, were redrawn as Salem North, Salem South and Salem West. It is also a part of Salem Lok Sabha constituency.

Salem North was one of the 17 Assembly constituencies to have VVPAT facility with EVMs in the 2016 Tamil Nadu Legislative Assembly election.

Salem North consists of:

1. Salem Municipal Corporation Wards - No.6 to 16 and 26 to 36
2. Kannankurichi (Town Panchayat)

== Members of the Legislative Assembly ==
Election	Member	Party
2011	R. Mohan Raj	Desiya Murpokku Dravida Kazhagam
2016	R. Rajendran	Dravida Munnetra Kazhagam
2021	R. Rajendran	Dravida Munnetra Kazhagam
2026	Sivakumar. K	Tamilaga Vettri Kazhagam

== Election results ==
Vote share of winning candidates
2026	40.68%
2021	46.52%
2016	45.14%
2011	54.46%

=== 2026 ===
2026 Tamil Nadu Legislative Assembly election: Salem (North)
Party	Candidate	Votes	%	±%
TVK	Sivakumar. K	85,710	40.68	New
DMK	Rajendran. R	71,676	34.02	▼12.15
PMK	Sadhasivam. S	44,238	20.99	New
NTK	Gunaseela. M	6,450	3.06	▼0.97
NOTA	NOTA	1,205	0.57	
Margin of victory		14,034	6.66	▲2.92
Turnout		2,10,712	88.28	▲16.22
Registered electors		2,38,685		▼37,337
TVK gain from DMK		Swing	▲40.68	

=== 2021 ===
2021 Tamil Nadu Legislative Assembly election: Salem North
Party	Candidate	Votes	%	±%
DMK	R. Rajendran	93,432	46.17	+1.04
AIADMK	G. Venkatachalam	85,844	42.42	+2.43
MNM	R.S. Guru Chakravarthy	10,718	5.3	new
NTK	N. Imaya Eswaran	8,155	4.03	+3.01
Majority		7,588	3.74	−1.4
Turnout		1,98,896	72.06	−0.06
Registered electors		2,76,022		
DMK hold		Swing	+1.04	

=== 2016 ===
2016 Tamil Nadu Legislative Assembly election: Salem North
Party	Candidate	Votes	%	±%
DMK	R. Rajendran	86,583	45.13	n/a
AIADMK	K.R.S.Saravanan	76,710	39.99	n/a
PMK	Kathir. Raasaratinam	7,975	4.16	n/a
BJP	R.P.Gopinath	5,922	3.08	+0.55
TMC(M)	R. Devadass	4,157	2.16	n/a
None of the Above	None of the Above	4,009	2.09	n/a
NTK	R. Kovendhan	1,954	1.02	n/a
Majority		9,873	5.14	n/a
Turnout		1,91,841	72.12	−2.42
Registered electors		2,65,999		
DMK gain from DMDK		Swing	n/a	

=== 2011 ===
2011 Tamil Nadu Legislative Assembly election: Salem North
Party	Candidate	Votes	%	±%
DMDK	R. Mohan Raj	88,956	54.46	−
INC	G. Jayaprakash	59,591	36.48	−
UMK	C. Chinnusamy	4,517	2.77	−
BJP	D. Mohan	4,133	2.53	−
IJK	V. Venkatesan	1,965	1.20	−
Majority		29,365	17.98	n/a
Turnout		1,63,459	74.53	−
Registered electors		219,327		
DMDK win (new seat)				
