= S. Lakshmanan (politician, born 1968) =

Indian politician

S. Lakshman

Member of the Tamil Nadu Legislative Assembly
- Incumbent
- Assumed office 4 May 2026
- Preceded by: R. Arul
- Constituency: Salem (West)

Personal details
- Born: 1968 (age 57–58)
- Party: Tamilaga Vettri Kazhagam
- Profession: Politician

Somasundharam Lakshmanan is an Indian politician from Tamil Nadu. He is a member of the Tamil Nadu Legislative Assembly from Salem (West) representing Tamilaga Vettri Kazhagam.

== Early life and education ==
Lakshman is the son of Somasundharam. He was a suspended policeman and is now engaged in agriculture and serves as a manager in a private company. He completed a Bachelor of Commerce degree from Arignar Anna Government Arts College for Men, Namakkal, affiliated with the University of Madras, in 1988.

=== Land-grab case and Suspension ===
In 2011, police registered several land-grab cases against former Tamil Nadu minister Veerapandi S. Arumugam and others. S. Lakshmanan, then a police inspector, was named as an accused in some of the cases, including cases relating to alleged land grabbing in Salem district.

According to contemporaneous news reports, Lakshmanan was a co-accused in the Angammal Colony, Dasanaickenpatti, Premier Mills and Coimbatore Jewellers land-grab cases. He was arrested in connection with the Angammal Colony case and was subsequently suspended from service before being released on bail.

In July 2012, the Directorate of Vigilance and Anti-Corruption (DVAC) conducted searches at properties linked to Lakshmanan and his relatives after registering a case alleging possession of assets disproportionate to his known sources of income.

== Political career ==
Lakshman won the Salem (West) seat in the 2026 Tamil Nadu Legislative Assembly election as a candidate of Tamilaga Vettri Kazhagam. He received 1,20,407 votes and defeated M. Karthe of the Pattali Makkal Katchi by a margin of 74,867 votes.
