= Jayankondam Assembly constituency =

One of the 234 State Legislative Assembly Constituencies in Tamil Nadu, in India

Coordinates: 11.2121853°N 79.3458554°E

Jayankondam
- Constituency No. 150 for the Tamil Nadu Legislative Assembly

Constituency details
- Country: India
- Region: South India
- State: Tamil Nadu
- District: Ariyalur
- Lok Sabha constituency: Chidambaram
- Established: 1951
- Total electors: 2,63,862
- Reservation: None

Member of Legislative Assembly
- 17th Tamil Nadu Legislative Assembly
- Incumbent G. Vaithilingam
- Party: PMK
- Alliance: NDA
- Elected year: 2026

Jayankondam is a state assembly constituency in Ariyalur district in Tamil Nadu. Its State Assembly Constituency number is 150. It falls under Chidambaram Lok Sabha constituency. It is one of the 234 State Legislative Assembly Constituencies in Tamil Nadu, in India.

Most successful party: DMK (six times).

== Members of Legislative Assembly ==
Year	Member	Political party
Madras State
1952	Ayyavu	Tamil Nadu Toilers' Party
1957	K. R. Viswanathan	Indian National Congress
1962	Jegadambal Velayudam	Dravida Munnetra Kazhagam
1967	K. A. A. K. Moorthy	Dravida Munnetra Kazhagam
Tamil Nadu
1971	A. Chinnasamy	Dravida Munnetra Kazhagam
1977	V. Karunamurthy	All India Anna Dravida Munnetra Kazhagam
1980	P. Thangavelu	Indian National Congress (I)
1984	N. Masilamani	Indian National Congress
1989	K. C. Ganesan	Dravida Munnetra Kazhagam
1991	K. K. Chinnappan	Indian National Congress
1996	K. C. Ganesan	Dravida Munnetra Kazhagam
2001	S. Annadurai	All India Anna Dravida Munnetra Kazhagam
2006	K. Rajendran	All India Anna Dravida Munnetra Kazhagam
2011	J. Guru	Pattali Makkal Katchi
2016	J. K. N. Ramajeyalingam	All India Anna Dravida Munnetra Kazhagam
2021	Ka. So. Ka. Kannan	Dravida Munnetra Kazhagam
2026	G. Vaithilingam	Pattali Makkal Katchi

== Demographics ==
Demographics (2016)
Category	Data
Created	2016
Vanniyar	37%
Sengunthar (Mudaliyar)	22%
Dalits	21%
Others	20%

== Election results ==
Vote share of winning candidates
2026	38.94%
2021	46.00%
2016	37.09%
2011	51.53%
2006	45.91%
2001	56.60%
1996	42.93%
1991	44.69%
1989	31.14%
1984	62.94%
1980	45.76%
1977	44.75%
1971	57.78%
1967	52.57%
1962	52.16%
1957	48.37%
1952	31.55%

=== 2026 ===
2026 Tamil Nadu Legislative Assembly election: Jayankondam
Party	Candidate	Votes	%	±%
PMK	G. Vaithilingam	88,992	38.94	▼4.54
DMK	Ka. So. Ka. Kannan	70,502	30.85	▼15.15
TVK	G. Kavitha Rajendran	55,538	24.30	New
NTK	K. Revathi	6,192	2.71	▼1.89
Aanaithinthiya Jananayaka Pathukappu Kazhagam	N. Ravisankar	1,203	0.53	New
Independent	S. Chanthirasekar	984	0.43	New
Independent	C. Vinothsavariremijeas	792	0.35	New
Naadaalum Makkal Katchi	M. Ravanan	711	0.31	New
Independent	M. Sankar	608	0.27	New
Independent	R. Anandhakumar	583	0.26	New
Independent	G. Jayabalan	528	0.23	New
BSP	Chinnadurai S.	475	0.21	▼0.07
NOTA	NOTA	416	0.18	▼0.68
TVK	Pagutharivalan A.	269	0.12	New
Independent	Gurunathan N.	177	0.08	New
Independent	Kannan K.	158	0.07	New
Desiya Makkal Sakthi Katchi	Azhagesan V.R.	151	0.07	New
Independent	Isac Newtan J.	115	0.05	New
Independent	Vezhaventhan D.	100	0.04	New
Independent	Venkatajalapathi R.	54	0.02	New
Margin of victory		18,490	8.09	▲5.57
Turnout		2,28,548	86.62	▲5.36
Registered electors		2,63,862		▼2,406
PMK gain from DMK		Swing	▼4.54	

=== 2021 ===
2021 Tamil Nadu Legislative Assembly election: Jayankondam
Party	Candidate	Votes	%	±%
DMK	Ka. So. Ka. Kannan	99,529	46.00%	
PMK	K. Balu	94,077	43.48%	
NTK	Mahalingam Neela	9,956	4.60%	3.95%
IJK	Sornalatha @ G. Latha	4,700	2.17%	
NOTA	Nota	1,864	0.86%	−0.09%
AMMK	J. K. Siva	1,560	0.72%	
Independent	V. K. Kesavarajan	1,546	0.71%	
Independent	S. Rajkumar	946	0.44%	
BSP	K. Neelamegam	605	0.28%	−0.01%
AIADMK	A. Natarajan	418	0.19%	−36.89%
Independent	R. Sathishkumar	349	0.16%	
Margin of victory		5,452	2.52%	−8.72%
Turnout		216,368	81.26%	−0.14%
Rejected ballots		408	0.19%	
Registered electors		266,268		
DMK gain from AIADMK		Swing	8.91%	

=== 2016 ===
2016 Tamil Nadu Legislative Assembly election: Jayankondam
Party	Candidate	Votes	%	±%
AIADMK	J. K. N. Ramajeyalingam	75,672	37.09%	−6.03%
PMK	Guru @ Gurunathan. J	52,738	25.85%	
INC	G. Rajendran	46,868	22.97%	
MDMK	M. S. Kandasamy	21,405	10.49%	
NOTA	None Of The Above	1,950	0.96%	
NTK	R. Krishnamoorthy	1,325	0.65%	
BJP	S. Krishnamoorthy	1,092	0.54%	−0.45%
Independent	S. Rajkumar	605	0.30%	
BSP	S. Chinnadurai	584	0.29%	−0.41%
NCP	N. Ulaganathan	414	0.20%	
Independent	Irulapo. Selvakumar	350	0.17%	
Margin of victory		22,934	11.24%	2.83%
Turnout		204,038	81.40%	−1.85%
Registered electors		250,673		
AIADMK gain from PMK		Swing	-14.44%	

=== 2011 ===
2011 Tamil Nadu Legislative Assembly election: Jayankondam
Party	Candidate	Votes	%	±%
PMK	Guru @ Gurunathan. J	92,739	51.53%	
AIADMK	P. Elavazhagan	77,601	43.12%	−2.80%
BJP	S. Krishnamoorthy	1,775	0.99%	0.14%
IJK	G. Ramachandran	1,771	0.98%	
Independent	V. Vadivel	1,698	0.94%	
BSP	N. Gnanasekaran	1,255	0.70%	−0.11%
Independent	P. Ganesan	989	0.55%	
Independent	C. Chakkaravarthi	948	0.53%	
Independent	T. Mallika	916	0.51%	
RJD	P. Asaithambi	289	0.16%	
Margin of victory		15,138	8.41%	6.89%
Turnout		216,216	83.24%	2.43%
Registered electors		179,981		
PMK gain from AIADMK		Swing	5.61%	

=== 2006 ===
2006 Tamil Nadu Legislative Assembly election: Jayankondam
Party	Candidate	Votes	%	±%
AIADMK	K. Rajendran	61,999	45.91%	−10.68%
PMK	J. Guru @ Gurunathan	59,948	44.40%	
DMDK	M. Johnson	6,435	4.77%	
Independent	K. Senthamil Selvi	1,866	1.38%	
Independent	S. Ramesh	1,189	0.88%	
BJP	R. Sasikumar	1,139	0.84%	
BSP	V. Umapathi	1,095	0.81%	
Independent	E. Kaviyarasi	976	0.72%	
Independent	R. Ayyappan	384	0.28%	
Margin of victory		2,051	1.52%	−18.43%
Turnout		135,031	80.81%	10.54%
Registered electors		167,088		
AIADMK hold		Swing	-10.68%	

=== 2001 ===
2001 Tamil Nadu Legislative Assembly election: Jayankondam
Party	Candidate	Votes	%	±%
AIADMK	S. Annadurai	70,948	56.60%	
DMK	K. C. Ganesan	45,938	36.65%	−6.29%
MDMK	K. N. Ramachandran	4,511	3.60%	−1.01%
Independent	V. S. Veeraswamy	2,029	1.62%	
Independent	G. C. Elaiyaradhakrishnan	1,262	1.01%	
Independent	K. Senthamizhchelvi	671	0.54%	
Margin of victory		25,010	19.95%	9.72%
Turnout		125,359	70.28%	−7.70%
Registered electors		178,379		
AIADMK gain from DMK		Swing	13.66%	

=== 1996 ===
1996 Tamil Nadu Legislative Assembly election: Jayankondam
Party	Candidate	Votes	%	±%
DMK	K. C. Ganesan	52,421	42.93%	18.69%
PMK	Gurunathan Alias Guru	39,931	32.70%	
INC	N. Masilamani	22,500	18.43%	−26.26%
MDMK	Dhana Sekhar	5,631	4.61%	
Independent	T. Ramalingam	962	0.79%	
Independent	Sentamil Selvi	248	0.20%	
JP	S. Panchamirtham	221	0.18%	
Independent	Pattusamy Asanc	121	0.10%	
Independent	Tk. Anna	66	0.05%	
Margin of victory		12,490	10.23%	−4.39%
Turnout		122,101	77.98%	1.61%
Registered electors		165,927		
DMK gain from INC		Swing	-1.76%	

=== 1991 ===
1991 Tamil Nadu Legislative Assembly election: Jayankondam
Party	Candidate	Votes	%	±%
INC	K. K. Chinnappan	49,406	44.69%	32.07%
PMK	S. Durairaju	33,238	30.06%	
DMK	K. C. Ganesan	26,801	24.24%	−6.90%
THMM	K. R. Ganesan	569	0.51%	
Independent	T. K. Annan	431	0.39%	
Independent	V. N. Nehruji	112	0.10%	
Margin of victory		16,168	14.62%	7.99%
Turnout		110,557	76.37%	21.36%
Registered electors		151,898		
INC gain from DMK		Swing	13.54%	

=== 1989 ===
1989 Tamil Nadu Legislative Assembly election: Jayankondam
Party	Candidate	Votes	%	±%
DMK	K. C. Ganesan	22,847	31.14%	
Independent	Muthukumarasamy	17,980	24.51%	
AIADMK	P. Muthaiyan	15,628	21.30%	
INC	N. Masilamani	9,256	12.62%	−50.32%
AIADMK	N. Eramalingam	6,480	8.83%	
Independent	A. K. Moorthy Alias Kaliyamoorthy	822	1.12%	
Independent	A. Rathinam	216	0.29%	
Independent	V. Samidurai	64	0.09%	
Independent	P. Sowrirajan	37	0.05%	
Independent	G. Chitrarasu	27	0.04%	
Margin of victory		4,867	6.63%	−31.36%
Turnout		73,357	55.02%	−23.82%
Registered electors		136,399		
DMK gain from INC		Swing	-31.79%	

=== 1984 ===
1984 Tamil Nadu Legislative Assembly election: Jayankondam
Party	Candidate	Votes	%	±%
INC	N. Masilamani	57,468	62.94%	17.17%
JP	J. Pannirselvam	22,778	24.95%	
Independent	G. Thiagarajan	6,778	7.42%	
INC(J)	S. Gangasalam	1,943	2.13%	
Independent	P. Anbarasan	1,432	1.57%	
Independent	T. K. Annan	529	0.58%	
Independent	A. K. Moorthy	262	0.29%	
Independent	K. R. Vijaya Kumari	120	0.13%	
Margin of victory		34,690	37.99%	32.36%
Turnout		91,310	78.83%	4.34%
Registered electors		123,972		
INC hold		Swing	17.17%	

=== 1980 ===
1980 Tamil Nadu Legislative Assembly election: Jayankondam
Party	Candidate	Votes	%	±%
INC	P. Thangavelu	39,862	45.76%	35.82%
AIADMK	T. Selvarajan	34,955	40.13%	−4.62%
Independent	V. Karunamurthi	11,512	13.22%	
Independent	Era. Erajalakshimi	773	0.89%	
Margin of victory		4,907	5.63%	−9.11%
Turnout		87,102	74.49%	1.15%
Registered electors		118,164		
INC gain from AIADMK		Swing	1.01%	

=== 1977 ===
1977 Tamil Nadu Legislative Assembly election: Jayankondam
Party	Candidate	Votes	%	±%
AIADMK	V. Karunamurthy	35,540	44.75%	
DMK	K. C. Ganesan	23,828	30.01%	−27.77%
INC	R. Mathivanan	7,898	9.95%	−30.79%
Independent	S. Ramasamy	7,701	9.70%	
JP	U. S. Ramamoorthy	4,193	5.28%	
Independent	K. M. S. Alagesan Pillai	252	0.32%	
Margin of victory		11,712	14.75%	−2.30%
Turnout		79,412	73.35%	−7.15%
Registered electors		109,695		
AIADMK gain from DMK		Swing	-13.03%	

=== 1971 ===
1971 Tamil Nadu Legislative Assembly election: Jayankondam
Party	Candidate	Votes	%	±%
DMK	A. Chinnasamy	41,627	57.78%	5.21%
INC	S. Ramasamy	29,346	40.73%	−2.82%
Independent	P. K. Ramasamy	1,071	1.49%	
Margin of victory		12,281	17.05%	8.03%
Turnout		72,044	80.50%	−0.52%
Registered electors		91,719		
DMK hold		Swing	5.21%	

=== 1967 ===
1967 Madras Legislative Assembly election: Jayankondam
Party	Candidate	Votes	%	±%
DMK	K. A. A. K. Moorthy	34,751	52.57%	0.41%
INC	S. Ramasami	28,791	43.56%	4.27%
Independent	Rathinam	1,607	2.43%	
Independent	K. Nayathan	951	1.44%	
Margin of victory		5,960	9.02%	−3.86%
Turnout		66,100	81.01%	8.38%
Registered electors		84,525		
DMK hold		Swing	0.41%	

=== 1962 ===
1962 Madras Legislative Assembly election: Jayankondam
Party	Candidate	Votes	%	±%
DMK	Jagadambal Velayudam	33,005	52.16%	
INC	S. Samikkannu Padayachi	24,856	39.28%	−9.09%
Independent	K.M. K. Subbaraya Chettiar	2,668	4.22%	
Independent	E. K. Manickam	1,526	2.41%	
Independent	K. Thangarajan	842	1.33%	
Independent	G. Raghavan	374	0.59%	
Margin of victory		8,149	12.88%	−10.09%
Turnout		63,271	72.63%	23.60%
Registered electors		91,628		
DMK gain from INC		Swing	3.79%	

=== 1957 ===
1957 Madras Legislative Assembly election: Jayankondam
Party	Candidate	Votes	%	±%
INC	K. R. Viswanathan	20,232	48.37%	30.79%
Independent	Jayaramulu Chettiar	10,625	25.40%	
Independent	Ayyaru	5,133	12.27%	
Independent	Baskaran	2,517	6.02%	
Independent	Raghava Vandaiyar	2,023	4.84%	
Independent	Rathinam	1,296	3.10%	
Margin of victory		9,607	22.97%	22.63%
Turnout		41,826	49.03%	−79.45%
Registered electors		85,309		
INC gain from TTP		Swing	16.82%	

=== 1952 ===
1952 Madras Legislative Assembly election: Jayankondam
Party	Candidate	Votes	%	±%
TTP	Ayyavu	58,397	31.55%	
INC	Muthukumaraswami Mudaliar	32,548	17.58%	17.58%
Independent	Veeraswami	8,291	4.48%	
Margin of victory		25,849	0.34%	
Turnout		127,325	88.36%	
Registered electors		144,066		
TTP win (new seat)				
