= R. Rajendran (DMK politician) =

Indian politician (born 1959)

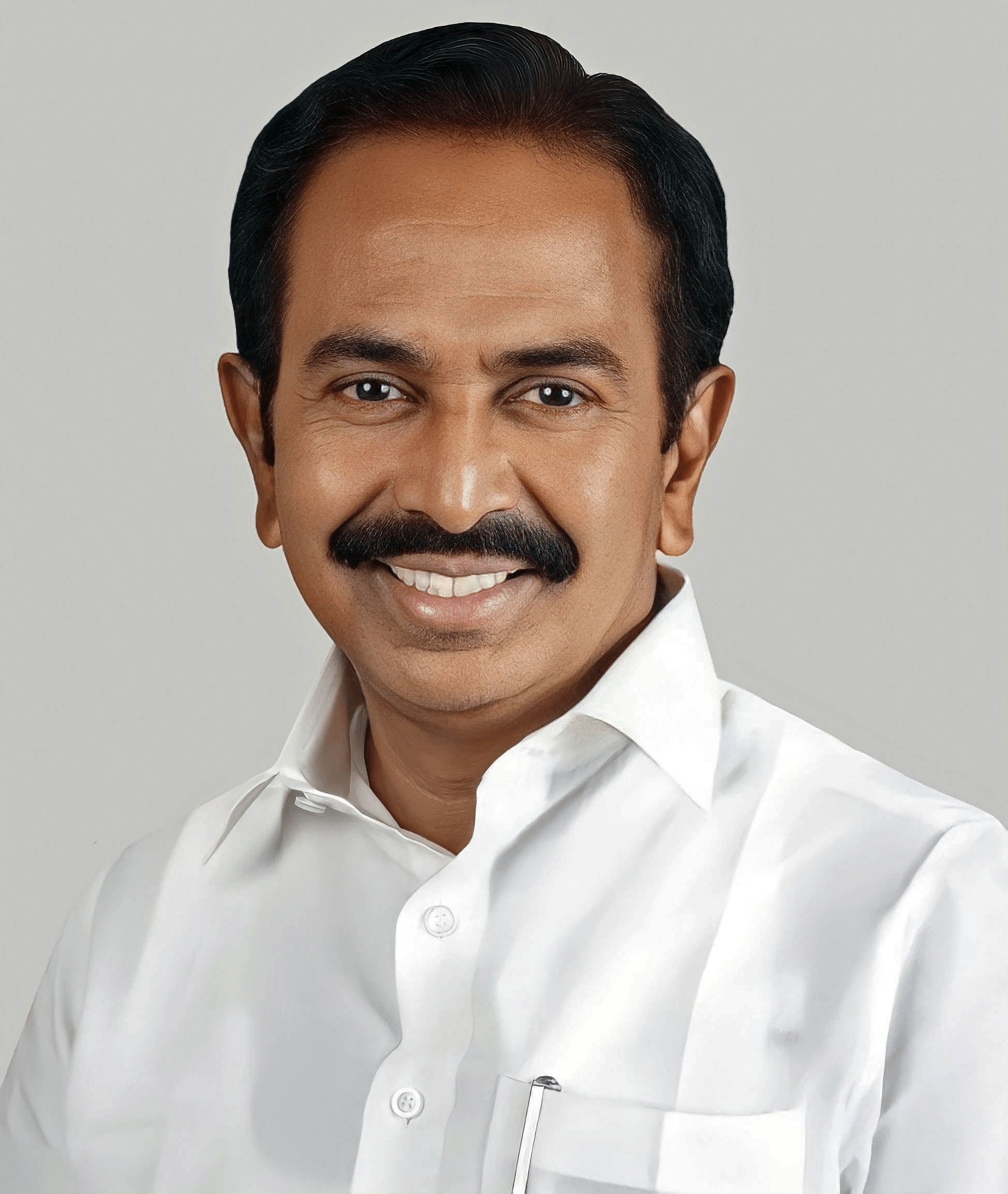

Minister of Tourism Government of Tamil Nadu
- In office 29 September 2024 – 5 May 2026
- Chief Minister: M. K. Stalin
- Preceded by: K. Ramachandran
- Succeeded by: S. Rajeshkumar

Member of the Tamil Nadu Legislative Assembly
- In office 19 May 2016 – 4 May 2026
- Preceded by: Azhagapuram Mohanraj
- Constituency: Salem North
- In office 11 May 2006 – 13 May 2011
- Preceded by: Vijayalakshmi Palanisamy
- Succeeded by: Constituency Abolished
- Constituency: Panamarathupatty

Personal details
- Born: 3 June 1959 (age 66) Salem, Tamil Nadu, India
- Party: Dravida Munnetra Kazhagam
- Spouse: Suseela Rajendran
- Children: 1 Daughter
- Education: Bachelor of Arts, Law
- Occupation: Politician, Advocate

R. Rajendran (born 3 June 1959) is an Indian politician who serves as Minister for Tourism in the Government of Tamil Nadu. He is a Member of Tamil Nadu Legislative Assembly for the constituency of Salem North.

== Early life ==
R. Rajendran was born on 3 June 1959 in Tamil Nadu. He hails from an agricultural background. He completed his primary school from Govt. School, Salem, and Higher Secondary school studies from Little Flower School, Salem. He entered politics during his college days and was active since early 1990s till now.

== Politics ==
In 1985 he was appointed the Student Wing District Organizer by the Party President M. Karunanidhi. In 1992 he was appointed the District Organizer at DMK Youth Wing by present DMK President and then Youth Wing Secretary M. K. Stalin. In 1999 he was appointed the State Youth Wing Deputy Secretary by M. K. Stalin. In 2004 he acted as the State President for the Government LPF.

In 2006 he was elected as the Member of Legislative Assembly, for the Panamarathupatty Assembly constituency . In 2015 he was appointed the District Secretary for the Dravida Munnetra Kazhagam Salem (Central) after the death of former Minister Veerapandi Arumugam by the Party President M. Karunanidhi. In 2016 he was elected as the Member of Legislative Assembly, for the Salem North Assembly constituency. In 2021 he was elected as the Member of Legislative Assembly, for the Salem North Assembly constituency for the second time.

== Ministry ==
On 29.09.2024 he was inducted in the Cabinet of DMK Ministry under Chief Minister M. K. Stalin and he took charge as Minister for Tourism, Government of Tamil Nadu. He is the Second Minister for Salem District from DMK.

== Electoral performance ==
Election	Constituency	Party	Result	Vote %	Runner-up	Runner-up Party	Runner-up vote %	Ref.
2021 Tamil Nadu Legislative Assembly election	Salem North	DMK	Won	46.52%	G. Venkatachalam	AIADMK	42.74%	
2016 Tamil Nadu Legislative Assembly election	Salem North	DMK	Won	45.14%	K. R. S. Saravanan	AIADMK	39.99%	
2011 Tamil Nadu Legislative Assembly election	Salem West	DMK	Lost	36.48%	G. Venkatachalam	AIADMK	54.46%	
2006 Tamil Nadu Legislative Assembly election	Panamarathupatty	DMK	Won	44.57%	R. Elangovan	AIADMK	42.20%	
2001 Tamil Nadu Legislative Assembly election	Omalur	DMK	Lost	30.89%	S. Semmalai	AIADMK	59.39%	
