= S. Sadhasivam =

Indian politician

Member of the Tamil Nadu Legislative Assembly
- In office 12 May 2021 – 4 May 2026
- Preceded by: S. Semmalai
- Succeeded by: G. Venkatachalam
- Constituency: Mettur

Personal details
- Born: 1967 (age 58–59) Salem, Tamil Nadu, India
- Party: PMK (Anbumani)
- Parent: Subbagounder (father)
- Occupation: Politician, Entrepreneur

Subbagounder Sadhasivam is an Indian politician who is a Member of Legislative Assembly of Tamil Nadu. He was elected from Mettur as a Pattali Makkal Katchi candidate in 2021. In 2025, Sadhasivam declared support for PMK President Anbumani Ramadoss, which resulted in him being censured by party founder S. Ramadoss, and, along with 2 other PMK MLAs, later joined the faction of the PMK led by Anbumani.

== Elections contested ==
Election	Constituency	Party	Result	Vote %	Runner-up	Runner-up Party	Runner-up vote %	Ref.
2021 Tamil Nadu Legislative Assembly election	Mettur	PMK	Won	44.43%	S. Srinivasaperumal	DMK	44.13%	
