= M. P. Kamaraj =

Member of the Legislative Assembly, Tamil Nadu Legislative Assembly
- In office 2001–2006
- Preceded by: P. Govindan
- Succeeded by: P. Kannan
- Constituency: Taramangalam

Personal details
- Born: 17 June 1961 Mecheri
- Party: Pattali Makkal Katchi
- Profession: Lawyer

M. P. Kamaraj is an Indian politician and a former Member of the Tamil Nadu Legislative Assembly. He hails from Mecheri town in the Salem district. A lawyer by profession, Kamaraj holds Bachelor of Arts (B.A.) and Bachelor of Laws (L.L.B.) degrees. Representing the Pattali Makkal Katchi (PMK) party, he contested and won the 2001 Tamil Nadu Legislative Assembly election from the Taramangalam Assembly constituency.

== Electoral Performance ==
=== 2001 ===
2001 Tamil Nadu Legislative Assembly election: Taramangalam
| Party | Candidate | Votes | % | ±% |
|---|---|---|---|---|
| PMK | M. P. Kamaraj | 67,012 | 56.09% | |
| DMK | S. Ammasi | 41,554 | 34.78% | 12.21% |
| MDMK | V. Vaithinathan | 2,983 | 2.50% | −4.41% |
| Independent | R. Murugan | 2,509 | 2.10% | |
| Independent | K. Govindaraj | 2,032 | 1.70% | |
| Independent | C. Lakshimannan | 1,928 | 1.61% | |
| LJP | P. Srinivasan | 421 | 0.35% | |
| Independent | A. M. Govindan | 410 | 0.34% | |
| Independent | M. Govindan | 317 | 0.27% | |
| Independent | M. Annadurai | 302 | 0.25% | |
| Margin of victory | | 25,458 | 21.31% | −0.31% |
| Turnout | | 1,19,468 | 61.01% | −5.73% |
| Registered electors | | 1,95,838 | | |
| PMK hold | | Swing | 11.91% | |
