= Salem West Assembly constituency =

State Legislative Assembly Constituency in Tamil Nadu

Coordinates: 11.67°N 78.10°E

Salem (West)
- Constituency No. 88 for the Tamil Nadu Legislative Assembly

Constituency details
- Country: India
- Region: South India
- State: Tamil Nadu
- District: Salem
- Lok Sabha constituency: Salem
- Established: 2008
- Total electors: 2,58,040

Member of Legislative Assembly
- 17th Tamil Nadu Legislative Assembly
- Incumbent Lakshmanan.S
- Party: TVK
- Elected year: 2026

Salem West or 'Salem (West)' is a state assembly constituency in the Indian state of Tamil Nadu that was formed after the constituency delimitations of 2008. Its State Assembly Constituency number is 88. The previous constituencies, Salem I and Salem II, were redrawn as Salem North, Salem South and Salem West. It comprises portions of the Omalur and Salem taluks. It is a part of the wider Salem Lok Sabha constituency for national elections to the Parliament of India. It is one of the 234 State Legislative Assembly Constituencies in Tamil Nadu.

== Boundaries ==
Salem West consists of the following parts in its limits:

- Omalur taluk (part): Muthunaickenpatti, Chellapillaikuttai, Pagalpatti, Manguppai, Saminayakkanpatti, Kottagoundampatti, Anaigoundampatti, Vellakkalpatti, T. Konagapadi, Alagusamudram and Karukkalvadi villages.
- Salem taluk (part):
  - Sarkar Gollappatti, A. Ayyamperumalpatti, Chettichavadi, Kondappanayakkanpatti, M. Palapatti and Selathampatti villages.
  - Thalavaipatti (CT) and Mallamooppampatti (CT).
  - Salem Municipal Corporation Wards - No.1 to 5 and No.17 to 25

== Members of Legislative Assembly ==
Year	Winner	Party
2011	G. Venkatachalam	All India Anna Dravida Munnetra Kazhagam
2016	G. Venkatachalam	All India Anna Dravida Munnetra Kazhagam
2021	Arul Ramadas	Pattali Makkal Katchi
2026	Lakshmanan.S	Tamilaga Vettri Kazhagam

== Election results ==
Vote share of winning candidates
2026	51.37%
2021	49.07%
2016	39.88%
2011	56.50%

=== 2026 ===
2026 Tamil Nadu Legislative Assembly election: Salem (West)
Party	Candidate	Votes	%	±%
TVK	S. Lakshmanan	120,407	51.37	New
PMK	Karthe.M	45,540	19.43	▼29.64
DMDK	Alagaapuram R. Mohanraj	41,522	17.71	▲16.64
Aanaithinthiya Jananayaka Pathukappu Kazhagam	Arul Ramadas	12,532	5.35	New
NTK	Suresh Kumar.R	6,820	2.91	▼2.05
NOTA	NOTA	1,052	0.45	▼0.33
Margin of victory		74,867	31.94	▲21.94
Turnout		2,43,779	94.47	▲22.73
Registered electors		2,58,040		▼41,565
TVK gain from PMK		Swing	▲51.37	

=== 2021 ===
2021 Tamil Nadu Legislative Assembly election: Salem (West)
Party	Candidate	Votes	%	±%
PMK	Arul Ramadas	105,483	49.07%	
DMK	A. Rajendran	83,984	39.07%	2.77%
NTK	S. Nagammal	10,668	4.96%	4.28%
MNM	A. Thiyagarajan	7,939	3.69%	
DMDK	Alagaapuram R. Mohanraj	2,307	1.07%	−3.35%
NOTA	Nota	1,683	0.78%	−0.75%
Margin of victory		21,499	10.00%	6.42%
Turnout		214,945	71.74%	−2.91%
Rejected ballots		507	0.24%	
Registered electors		299,605		
PMK gain from AIADMK		Swing	9.19%	

=== 2016 ===
2016 Tamil Nadu Legislative Assembly election: Salem (West)
Party	Candidate	Votes	%	±%
AIADMK	G. Venkatachalam	80,755	39.88%	−16.62%
DMK	C. Panneer Selvam	73,508	36.30%	−3.91%
PMK	R. Arul	29,982	14.81%	
DMDK	Alagaapuram R. Mohanraj	8,962	4.43%	
NOTA	None Of The Above	3,107	1.53%	
NTK	A. Rasa	1,374	0.68%	
Margin of victory		7,247	3.58%	−12.71%
Turnout		202,478	74.66%	−5.26%
Registered electors		271,212		
AIADMK hold		Swing	-16.62%	

=== 2011 ===
2011 Tamil Nadu Legislative Assembly election: Salem (West)
Party	Candidate	Votes	%	±%
AIADMK	G. Venkatachalam	95,935	56.50%	
DMK	R. Rajendran	68,274	40.21%	
BJP	K. K. Elumalai	1,327	0.78%	
APM	A. Annadurai	853	0.50%	
IJK	K. R. Balaji	796	0.47%	
Margin of victory		27,661	16.29%	
Turnout		212,454	79.92%	
Registered electors		169,785		
AIADMK win (new seat)				
