= A. Ganeshkumar =

Indian politician

Member of Tamil Nadu Legislative Assembly
- Incumbent
- Assumed office 11 May 2026
- Preceded by: K. S. Masthan
- Constituency: Gingee
- In office 23 May 2011 – 21 May 2016
- Preceded by: V. Kannan
- Succeeded by: K. S. Masthan
- Constituency: Gingee

Personal details
- Born: April 26, 1984 (age 42) Besant Nagar, Chennai, Tamil Nadu, India
- Party: Pattali Makkal Katchi
- Parent: S. Arunachalam (father)
- Occupation: Consultant and Trustee of Education Institution, Politician

Arunachalam Ganeshkumar (sometimes spelled Ganesh Kumar) (born 26 April 1984) is an Indian politician and was a member of the 14th Tamil Nadu Legislative Assembly from the Gingee constituency. He represented the Pattali Makkal Katchi party.

The elections of 2016 resulted in his constituency being won by K. S. Masthan.

In October 2025, A. Ganeshkumar, who previously served as the PMK East Tiruvannamalai District Secretary and as a Member of the Legislative Assembly for Gingee, was appointed as the State Youth Wing President of the Pattali Makkal Katchi (PMK). PMK president Dr. Anbumani Ramadoss presented the appointment order.

A. Ganeshkumar was born in Chennai on 26 April 1984 and has a M.E., Ph.D. degree.
