= Anaithindhiya Jananayaka Padhugappu Kazhagam =

- President: S. Ramadoss
- General Secretary: Murali Sankar
- Treasurer: Syed Mansoor Ushen
- Founder: S. Ramadoss
- Founded: 2025; 1 year ago
- Dissolved: 24 June 2026; 3 months ago
- Split from: Pattali Makkal Katchi
- Merged into: Pattali Makkal Katchi
- Headquarters: Tindivanam, Villupuram District, Tamil Nadu
- Ideology: Casteism; Conservatism; Right-wing populism
- Political position: Right-wing
- ECI status: Unrecognised Party

Election symbol
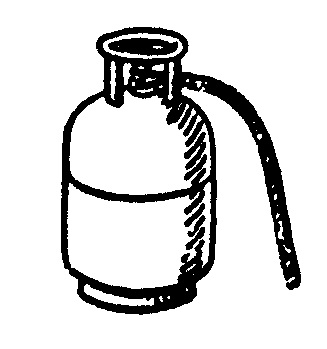
- Gas Cylinder

Party flag

The Anaithindhiya Jananayaka Padhugappu Kazhagam (transl. All India Democratic Protection Federation; abbreviated as AJPK) was a splinter faction of the regional political party Pattali Makkal Katchi (PMK), based in Tamil Nadu. It was led by founder Dr. S. Ramadoss, who founded the original PMK that is currently led by his son, Anbumani. The faction emerged in 2025 after a major leadership conflict between Ramadoss and his son, Dr. Anbumani Ramadoss, over control of the party. While the Election Commission of India (ECI) has issued communications recognising Anbumani's camp, the Ramadoss faction rejects these claims, insisting that procedural norms were violated and that Anbumani's term as president expired in May 2025. This faction got the name Ayya Pattali Makkal Katchi and symbol as 'Gas Cylinder' by the Election Commission of India in 2026.

The party has been disbanded after S. Ramadoss and Anbumani Ramadoss resolved the dispute on 24 June 2026.

== History ==
=== Founding and early years ===
The parent party, PMK, was founded by Dr. S. Ramadoss on 16 July 1989, emerging out of the Vanniyar Sangam movement that had spearheaded the 1987 Vanniyar reservation agitation. The party sought to secure political representation for the Vanniyar community of northern Tamil Nadu.

Throughout the 1990s and 2000s, the PMK aligned with different state and national coalitions, including the NDA and the UPA, often playing a pivotal role as a kingmaker in coalition politics.

=== 2025 tensions and split ===
In early 2025, tensions between Ramadoss and his son Anbumani intensified over party appointments, particularly the elevation of Ramadoss's grandson P. Mukundan as youth wing president. In April 2025, Ramadoss demoted Anbumani from president to working president, sparking a leadership contest.

Anbumani’s camp organised a general council meeting in August 2025 that extended his term and secured ECI communication recognising his leadership and office bearers until August 2026. The Ramadoss faction disputes the legality of this meeting, claiming it was unauthorised and against party by-laws. They argue that Anbumani’s tenure ended on 28 May 2025.

=== Legislative strength ===
In the 2021 Tamil Nadu assembly election, the undivided PMK won five seats. Following the 2025 split:

- Three MLAs S. P. Venkateshwaran of Dharmapuri, S. Sadhasivam of Mettur, and C. Sivakumar of Mailam declared support for Anbumani.
- Two MLAs, including R. Arul of Salem West and senior leader G. K. Mani of Pennagaram, aligned with Dr. S. Ramadoss.

== Ideology ==
The Ramadoss faction continues the founder’s emphasis on:

- Vanniyar community rights and socioeconomic upliftment
- Demand for a 10.5% internal reservation within the MBC category
- Social conservatism and opposition to inter-caste marriages

== Current office bearers ==
National Executive (Ramadoss faction)
S.No	Member	Party Position
1.	S. Ramadoss	President
2.	Srikanthi Parasuraman	Executive President of PMK
3.	Murali Sankar	General Secretary of PMK
4.	Syed Mansoor Ushen	Treasurer of PMK
5.	G. K. Mani	Ex-MLA, Pennagaram, Honorary Party President, Former Party President (1997–2022)
6.	R. Arul	Ex-MLA, Salem West

== See also ==
- Pattali Makkal Katchi
- S. Ramadoss
- Anbumani Ramadoss
- Vanniyar Sangam
