= K. C. Ganesan =

Indian politician

Ka. So. Ganesan is an Indian politician and former Member of the Legislative Assembly of Tamil Nadu. He was elected to the Tamil Nadu legislative assembly as a Dravida Munnetra Kazhagam candidate from Jayankondam constituency in 1989, and 1996 elections. His Son Ka.So.Ka.Kannan serves as the Member of the Legislative Assembly of Jayankondam constituency.
