= Taramangalam Assembly constituency =

Legislative assembly constituency, in Tamil Nadu, India

Coordinates: 11.69°N 77.97°E

Taramangalam
- Former constituency for the Tamil Nadu Legislative Assembly

Constituency details
- Country: India
- Region: South India
- State: Tamil Nadu
- District: Salem
- Lok Sabha constituency: Dharmapuri
- Established: 1957
- Abolished: 2008
- Total electors: 200,861
- Reservation: None

Taramangalam is a state assembly constituency in Salem district in Tamil Nadu. It is one of the 234 State Legislative Assembly Constituencies in Tamil Nadu, in India. Elections and winners in the constituency are listed below. The constituency was in existence from the 1957 election to 2008.

== Members of the Legislative Assembly ==
Year	Winner	Party
Madras State
1957	N. S. Sundararajan	Indian National Congress
1962	N. S. Sundararajan	Indian National Congress
1967	Govindan	Dravida Munnetra Kazhagam
Tamil Nadu
1971	Paramasivam	Dravida Munnetra Kazhagam
1977	R. Narayanan	Indian National Congress
1980	S. Semmalai	Independent
1984	S. Semmalai	All India Anna Dravida Munnetra Kazhagam
1989	K. Arjunan	Anna Dravida Munnetra Kazhagam (Jayalalitha)
1991	R. Palanisamy	Indian National Congress
1996	P. Govindan	Pattali Makkal Katchi
2001	M. P. Kamaraj	Pattali Makkal Katchi
2006	P. Kannan	Pattali Makkal Katchi

== Election results ==
Vote share of winning candidates
2006	34.60%
2001	56.09%
1996	44.19%
1991	47.66%
1989	25.49%
1984	69.68%
1980	60.33%
1977	34.59%
1971	61.79%
1967	57.80%
1962	52.65%
1957	63.47%

=== 2006 ===
2006 Tamil Nadu Legislative Assembly election: Taramangalam
Party	Candidate	Votes	%	±%
PMK	P. Kannan	49,045	34.60%	
Independent	P. Govindan	36,791	25.95%	
MDMK	K. S. V. Thamarai Kannan	34,960	24.66%	22.17%
DMDK	C. J. Suresh	14,870	10.49%	
Independent	A. Rajendra Kumar	1,682	1.19%	
BJP	P. Muthusamy	1,130	0.80%	
Independent	P. Govindan	1,046	0.74%	
Independent	M. Palanivel	818	0.58%	
Independent	M. Govindan	725	0.51%	
Independent	K. Gurusamy	690	0.49%	
Margin of victory		12,254	8.64%	−12.67%
Turnout		1,41,757	70.57%	9.57%
Registered electors		2,00,861		
PMK hold		Swing	-21.49%	

=== 2001 ===
2001 Tamil Nadu Legislative Assembly election: Taramangalam
Party	Candidate	Votes	%	±%
PMK	M. P. Kamaraj	67,012	56.09%	
DMK	S. Ammasi	41,554	34.78%	12.21%
MDMK	V. Vaithinathan	2,983	2.50%	−4.41%
Independent	R. Murugan	2,509	2.10%	
Independent	K. Govindaraj	2,032	1.70%	
Independent	C. Lakshimannan	1,928	1.61%	
LJP	P. Srinivasan	421	0.35%	
Independent	A. M. Govindan	410	0.34%	
Independent	M. Govindan	317	0.27%	
Independent	M. Annadurai	302	0.25%	
Margin of victory		25,458	21.31%	−0.31%
Turnout		1,19,468	61.01%	−5.73%
Registered electors		1,95,838		
PMK hold		Swing	11.91%	

=== 1996 ===
1996 Tamil Nadu Legislative Assembly election: Taramangalam
Party	Candidate	Votes	%	±%
PMK	P. Govindan	50,502	44.19%	
DMK	P. Elavarasan	25,795	22.57%	
INC	R. Palanisamy	25,375	22.20%	−25.46%
MDMK	P. Kandasamy	7,889	6.90%	
Independent	S. Andiyappan	801	0.70%	
Independent	M. Govindarajan	489	0.43%	
Independent	K. R. Kandasamy	417	0.36%	
Independent	M. Mayilsamy	330	0.29%	
Independent	A. Kandasamy	320	0.28%	
Independent	P. Selvaraj	260	0.23%	
Independent	G. Karunakaran	248	0.22%	
Margin of victory		24,707	21.62%	13.76%
Turnout		1,14,293	66.74%	0.43%
Registered electors		1,83,768		
PMK gain from INC		Swing	-3.47%	

=== 1991 ===
1991 Tamil Nadu Legislative Assembly election: Taramangalam
Party	Candidate	Votes	%	±%
INC	R. Palanisamy	50,538	47.66%	35.13%
PMK	S. Ammasi	42,204	39.80%	
JD	P. Nacrimuthu	11,602	10.94%	
Independent	A. Kandasamy	450	0.42%	
Independent	K. Sundaram	403	0.38%	
Independent	C. Mani	315	0.30%	
Independent	K. Sithan	211	0.20%	
Independent	P. K. Karuppannan	160	0.15%	
Independent	R. Palanisamy	153	0.14%	
Margin of victory		8,334	7.86%	5.20%
Turnout		1,06,036	66.30%	24.57%
Registered electors		1,66,184		
INC gain from AIADMK		Swing	22.18%	

=== 1989 ===
1989 Tamil Nadu Legislative Assembly election: Taramangalam
Party	Candidate	Votes	%	±%
AIADMK	K. Arjunan	15,818	25.49%	−44.20%
Independent	P. Kandasamy	14,165	22.82%	
DMK	P. Arrjunan	13,301	21.43%	−6.52%
AIADMK	S. Semmalai	8,100	13.05%	−56.63%
INC	T. Arunachalam	7,780	12.54%	
Independent	C. Ganesan	1,153	1.86%	
Independent	T. M. Rajamanickam	328	0.53%	
Independent	M. Govindan	311	0.50%	
Independent	P. Arumugam	301	0.48%	
Independent	S. Kiliappan	243	0.39%	
Independent	K. Sundar Ganeson	139	0.22%	
Margin of victory		1,653	2.66%	−39.07%
Turnout		62,066	41.74%	−31.03%
Registered electors		1,52,563		
AIADMK hold		Swing	-44.20%	

=== 1984 ===
1984 Tamil Nadu Legislative Assembly election: Taramangalam
Party	Candidate	Votes	%	±%
AIADMK	S. Semmalai	63,407	69.68%	
DMK	K. Arjunan	25,429	27.95%	
Independent	N. Perumal Gounder	533	0.59%	
Independent	Chinnappan	414	0.45%	
Independent	C. Manickam	348	0.38%	
Independent	K. S. Arumugam	223	0.25%	
Independent	Palanisamy	215	0.24%	
Independent	Rajugoundan	207	0.23%	
Independent	P. Dhanappan	130	0.14%	
Independent	G. Dhanabalan	89	0.10%	
Margin of victory		37,978	41.74%	14.51%
Turnout		90,995	72.76%	2.99%
Registered electors		1,30,679		
AIADMK gain from Independent		Swing	9.35%	

=== 1980 ===
1980 Tamil Nadu Legislative Assembly election: Taramangalam
Party	Candidate	Votes	%	±%
Independent	S. Semmalai	49,597	60.33%	
INC	R. Narayanan	27,214	33.11%	−1.49%
CPI	S. R. Perumal	3,909	4.76%	
Independent	K. S. Arumugam	1,193	1.45%	
Independent	K. Asaithambi	290	0.35%	
Margin of victory		22,383	27.23%	27.20%
Turnout		82,203	69.78%	7.53%
Registered electors		1,19,790		
Independent gain from INC		Swing	25.74%	

=== 1977 ===
1977 Tamil Nadu Legislative Assembly election: Taramangalam
Party	Candidate	Votes	%	±%
INC	R. Narayanan	23,882	34.59%	−3.62%
AIADMK	S. Semmalai	23,863	34.56%	
JP	T. M. Ramasamy Gounder	10,073	14.59%	
DMK	K. R. Govindan	9,020	13.06%	−48.73%
Independent	K. Rajagopal	935	1.35%	
Independent	N. Perumal Gounder	917	1.33%	
Independent	P. M. Vadivel Gounder	351	0.51%	
Margin of victory		19	0.03%	−23.56%
Turnout		69,041	62.24%	1.62%
Registered electors		1,13,229		
INC gain from DMK		Swing	-27.20%	

=== 1971 ===
1971 Tamil Nadu Legislative Assembly election: Taramangalam
Party	Candidate	Votes	%	±%
DMK	Paramasivam	33,257	61.79%	4.00%
INC	T. M. Ramasamy Gounder	20,564	38.21%	−4.00%
Margin of victory		12,693	23.58%	7.99%
Turnout		53,821	60.62%	−7.25%
Registered electors		95,265		
DMK hold		Swing	4.00%	

=== 1967 ===
1967 Madras Legislative Assembly election: Taramangalam
Party	Candidate	Votes	%	±%
DMK	Govindan	33,222	57.80%	10.45%
INC	M. S. Krishnan	24,259	42.20%	−10.45%
Margin of victory		8,963	15.59%	10.29%
Turnout		57,481	67.87%	−4.66%
Registered electors		88,234		
DMK gain from INC		Swing	5.15%	

=== 1962 ===
1962 Madras Legislative Assembly election: Taramangalam
Party	Candidate	Votes	%	±%
INC	N. S. Sundararajan	30,020	52.65%	−10.82%
DMK	P. R. Nallathambi Gounder	26,997	47.35%	
Margin of victory		3,023	5.30%	−36.84%
Turnout		57,017	72.53%	38.65%
Registered electors		81,534		
INC hold		Swing	-10.82%	

=== 1957 ===
1957 Madras Legislative Assembly election: Taramangalam
Party	Candidate	Votes	%	±%
INC	N. S. Soundararajan	15,752	63.47%	
Independent	Chinnappan	5,293	21.33%	
Independent	Nallappa Mudaliar	2,741	11.04%	
Independent	Periasamy Mudali	1,033	4.16%	
Margin of victory		10,459	42.14%	
Turnout		24,819	33.88%	
Registered electors		73,266		
INC win (new seat)				
