= K. R. Viswanathan =

Indian politician

K. R. Viswanathan was an Indian politician and former Member of the Legislative Assembly of Tamil Nadu. He was elected to the Tamil Nadu legislative assembly as a Tamil Nadu Toilers Party candidate from Jayankondam constituency in 1952 election, and as an Indian National Congress candidate in 1957 election. He was one of the winners in 1952 election, the other being Ayyavu from Tamil Nadu Toilers Party.
