= N. S. Sundararajan =

Indian politician

Member of the Madras State Assembly
- In office 1957 - 1962; 1962 - 1967
- Constituency: Taramangalam

Personal details
- Political party: Indian National Congress

N. S. Sundararajan was an Indian politician and former Member of the Legislative Assembly of Tamil Nadu (Madras Presidency) Born on October 3, 1909. Died on September 12, 1984. He was elected to the Tamil Nadu legislative assembly from Taramangalam constituency as an Indian National Congress candidate in 1957, and 1962 elections.

He was born and brought up at Nanjai Edayar, a village in present-day Namakkal District, Tamil Nadu, India. Later he had his trace of settling down at Salem with his immediate family to practice law. Mr.N.S.Sundarajan was an agriculturist, then an advocate and turned a profound politician. Later he was associated with Modern Theatres owned by Mr.T. R. Sundaram (one of the biggest cinema production houses then). He had his film distribution company as well. Apart from all his professional and political interests, he had his love for language and literature too.

His sons Dr.N.S.Chandrasekaran and Mr.N.S.R.Muralidharan are now the founders of Virutcham Foundation on his name. And that has been dedicated to human care and environmental issues. His vision towards human care, rehabilitation and education has been instilled under Virutcham Foundation. And his interest towards language and literature has also been rooted as the base for Third Eye (an academy for language studies, soft skill management and creative science) owned by his youngest grandson Mr.Sooraj Muralidharan.
