= K. S. Masthan =

Indian politician

Gingee K. S. Masthan

Minister of Minorities Welfare, Non Resident Tamils Welfare, Refugees & Evacuees and Wakf Board. Government of Tamil Nadu
- In office 7 May 2021 – 28 Sep 2024
- Chief Minister: M. K. Stalin

MLA of Gingee
- In office 25 May 2016 – 5 May 2026
- Preceded by: A. Ganeshkumar
- Succeeded by: A. Ganeshkumar

Personal details
- Born: 31 May 1955 (age 70) Gingee, Tamil Nadu, India
- Party: Dravida Munnetra Kazhagam
- Spouse: Saidhani B Masthan (m. 1985)
- Children: 3 Daughters Maimunnisa, Jaibunnisa, Thaimunnisa; 1 Son K. S. M. Mokthiyar Masthan

Gingee K. S. Masthan (born 31 May 1955) is an Indian politician and one of the Ministers of Tamil Nadu from May 2021. He has been elected as a Member of Legislative Assembly (MLA) in 2016 on behalf of DMK in the Gingee assembly constituency which is a part of the Villupuram district. He was re-elected to the same legislative assembly in the 2021 Tamil Nadu assembly election. Following this, on 7 May 2021, he was appointed a Minister of Minorities Welfare, Wakf Board, and Non Resident Tamil Welfare, Refugees & Evacuees. Non Resident Tamil Welfare, Refugees & Evacuees is an initiative by the M.K. Stalin Cabinet Ministry. KS Masthan is also the District Secretary of Vilupuram North with DMK.

== Life ==
He was born in Gingee on 31 May 1955, to Ghaza Basha and Julaika Bi, who were farmers. He completed his E.S.L.C. schooling from Gingee Government High School in 1972. He married Saidhani B Masthan in 1985 and has three daughters, Mimunnisa, Jai Munnisa, Thai Munnisa and one son K. S. M. Mokthiyar Masthan.

== Politics ==
Masthan has been elected to Tamil Nadu Legislative Assembly for two consecutive terms from Gingee constituency in the elections of 2016 and 2021.

=== Party Responsibilities ===
- His political career began in 1976 when he became involved in Dravida Munnetra Kazhagam (DMK) political party while he was working as a Tea master in Gingee.
- In 1978, he became the secretary of the Gingee Perur Association.
- Member of the General Committee in 1980.
- Member of the Integrated Vilupuram District Management Committee in 1992.
- A member of the State Executive Committee in 1996.
- The Chairman of the Integrated Vilupuram District in 1999.
- Vilupuram North District Secretary since 2014.

== Government posts ==
- President of the Gingee Town Panchayat for 5 terms From 1986 to 2016.
- President of the Gingee Milk Producers Cooperative Society in 1989.
- Cuddalore – Vilupuram District Dairy Chief in 1996.
- Chairman of Gingee Agricultural Cooperative Bank in 1996.
- Member Legislative Assembly for Gingee from 2016, 2021 Elections.
- 2021-Minister for Minority Welfare and Overseas Tamil Welfare.
