= Ka. So. Ka. Kannan =

Indian politician

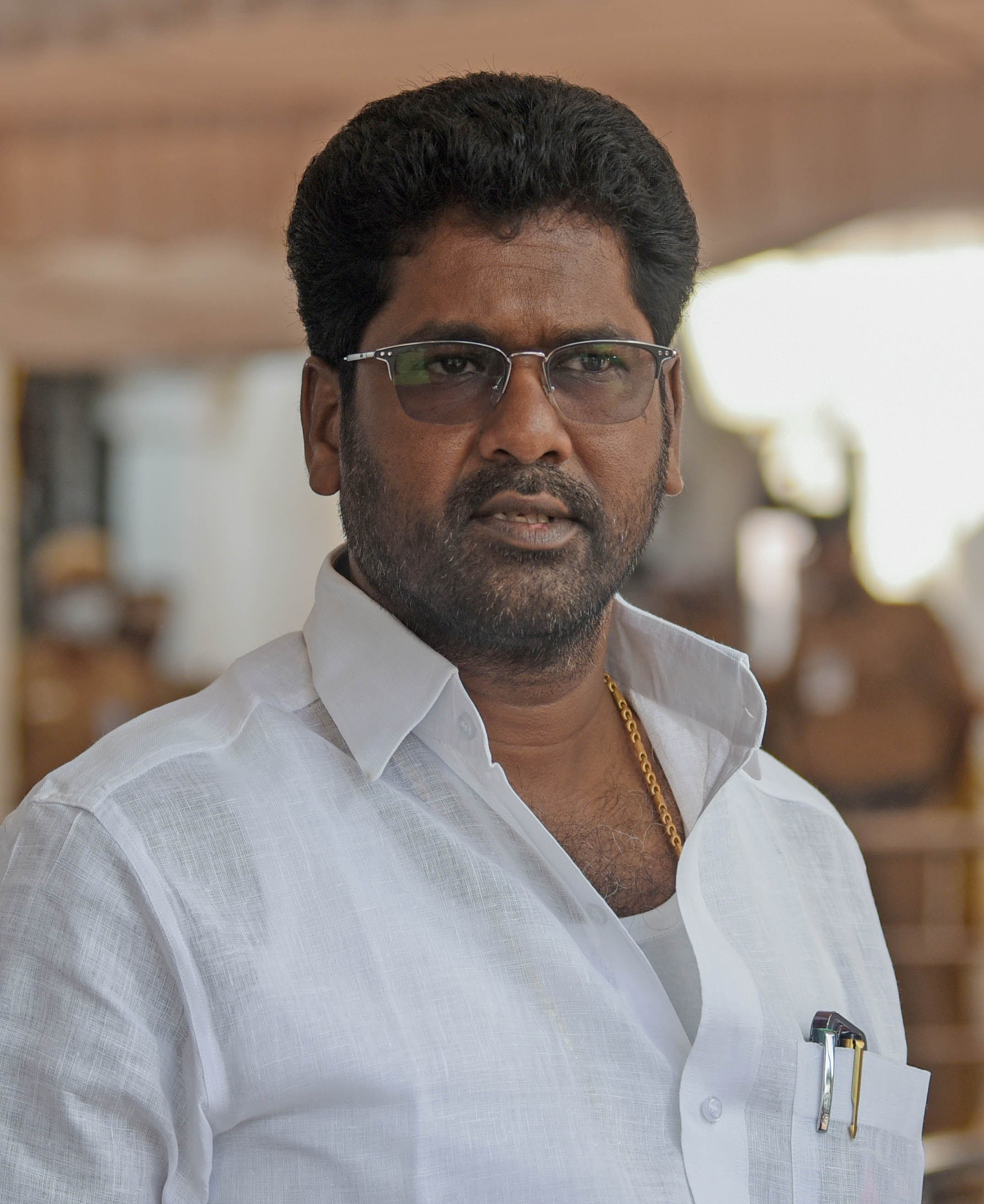

Member of the Tamil Nadu Legislative Assembly
- Incumbent
- Assumed office 12 May 2021
- Preceded by: K. N. Ramalingam
- Constituency: Jayankondam

Personal details
- Born: 16 June 1978 (age 48) Kandiyankollai
- Party: Dravida Munnetra Kazhagam (1996-present)
- Spouse: Malathi Kannan
- Parent: K. C. Ganesan (father) Manimegalai (mother)
- Education: Manonmaniam Sundaranar University
- Occupation: Politician Farmer Educationist

Kandiyankollai So. Ganesan Kannan is an Indian politician and former MLA from the Dravida Munnetra Kazhagam. He represented the Jayankondam constituency in the Tamil Nadu Legislative Assembly from 2021 until losing his seat in 2026.

== Elections contested ==
Election	Constituency	Party	Result	Vote %	Runner-up	Runner-up Party	Runner-up vote %	Ref.
2021 Tamil Nadu Legislative Assembly election	Jayankondam	DMK	Won	46.00%	K. Balu	PMK	43.48%	
