= Arul Ramadas =

Indian politician

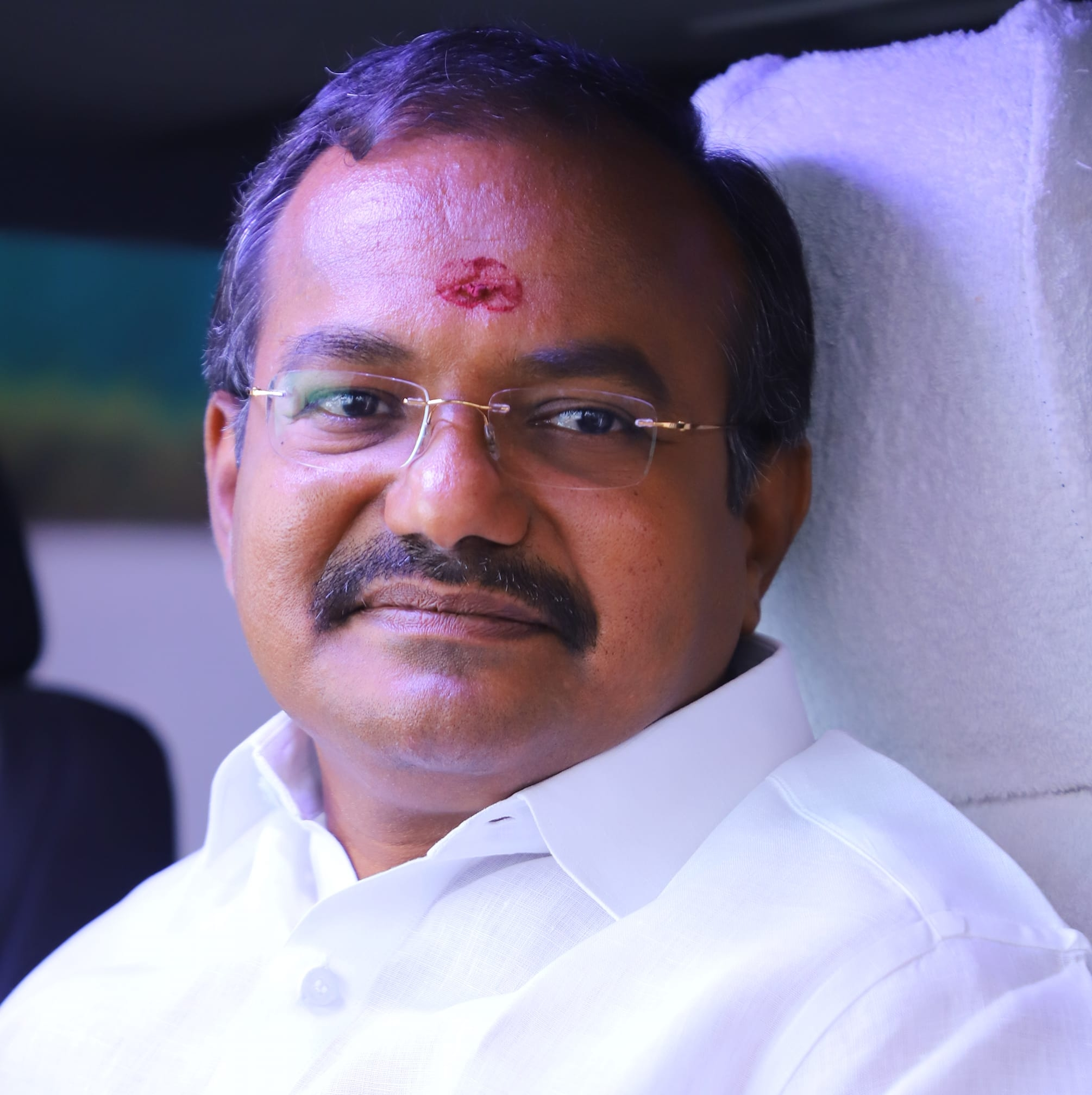

Member of Tamil Nadu Legislative Assembly
- In office 12 May 2021 – 4 May 2026
- Preceded by: G. Venkatachalam
- Succeeded by: S. Lakshmanan
- Constituency: Salem West

Joint General Secretary of the Pattali Makkal Katchi Member of the Legislative Assembly (Salem West)
- Incumbent
- Assumed office 25 June 2025

Personal details
- Born: 13 August 1971 (age 55) Salem, Tamil Nadu, India
- Party: Anaithindhiya Jananayaka Padhugappu Kazhagam
- Spouse: Kalpana Arul
- Children: 1 Son, 1 Daughter
- Parent: P. Ramadas (father)
- Education: Bachelor of Science, Chemistry
- Occupation: Agriculturist

R. Arul, popularly known as Arul Ramadas, is a politician from Salem, Tamil Nadu. He started his political career as a cadre and held various offices in Pattali Makkal Katchi. He is currently serving as Salem district secretary of PMK.

He was elected as a Member of the State Legislature from Salem West constituency in the 2021 Tamil Nadu Legislative Assembly election. He launched a website to communicate with his constituency voters and people to keep in touch with them and he is the first MLA in India to launch mobile MLA office in which he meets people at their own place to avoid people’s discomfort and personally ask people's problems.

== Electoral performance ==
2021 Tamil Nadu Legislative Assembly election: Salem (West)
Party	Candidate	Votes	%	±%
PMK	Arul Ramadas	105,483	49.07%	
DMK	A. Rajendran	83,984	39.07%	2.77%
NTK	S. Nagammal	10,668	4.96%	4.28%
MNM	A. Thiyagarajan	7,939	3.69%	
DMDK	Alagaapuram R. Mohanraj	2,307	1.07%	−3.35%
NOTA	Nota	1,683	0.78%	−0.75%
Margin of victory		21,499	10.00%	6.42%
Turnout		214,945	71.74%	−2.91%
Rejected ballots		507	0.24%	
Registered electors		299,605		
PMK gain from AIADMK		Swing	9.19%	
