= T. Natarajan (politician) =

Indian politician

T. Natarajan is an Indian politician who was elected to the Tamil Nadu Legislative Assembly from the Gingee constituency in the 1996 elections. He was a candidate of the Dravida Munnetra Kazhagam (DMK) party.
