= Gingee Assembly constituency =

State Legislative Assembly Constituency in Tamil Nadu

Coordinates: 12.15°N 79.30°E

Gingee
- Constituency No. 70 for the Tamil Nadu Legislative Assembly

Constituency details
- Country: India
- Region: South India
- State: Tamil Nadu
- District: Villupuram
- Lok Sabha constituency: Arani
- Established: 1951
- Total electors: 2,42,992
- Reservation: None

Member of Legislative Assembly
- 17th Tamil Nadu Legislative Assembly
- Incumbent A. Ganeshkumar
- Party: PMK
- Alliance: NDA
- Elected year: 2026

Gingee is a state assembly constituency in Viluppuram district of Tamil Nadu, India. Its State Assembly Constituency number is 70. It comprises a portion of Gingee taluk and is a part of the Arani Lok Sabha constituency for national elections to the Parliament of India. Most successful party: DMK (nine times). It is one of the 234 State Legislative Assembly Constituencies in Tamil Nadu, in India.

== Members of Legislative Assembly ==
Year	Member	Political party
Madras State
1952	Aranganathan	Tamil Nadu Toilers' Party
1957	M. Jangal Reddiar	Independent
1962	Rajaram	Indian National Congress
1967	V. Munusami	Dravida Munnetra Kazhagam
Tamil Nadu
1971	S. Sagadevan	Dravida Munnetra Kazhagam
1977	N. Ramachandran	Dravida Munnetra Kazhagam
1980	N. Ramachandran	Dravida Munnetra Kazhagam
1984	T. N. Muruganandam	Indian National Congress
1989	N. Ramachandran	Dravida Munnetra Kazhagam
1991	S. S. R. Eramasass	Indian National Congress
1996	T. Natarajan	Dravida Munnetra Kazhagam
2001	V. Elumalai	All India Anna Dravida Munnetra Kazhagam
2006	V. Kannan	Dravida Munnetra Kazhagam
2011	A. Ganeshkumar	Pattali Makkal Katchi
2016	K. S. Masthan	Dravida Munnetra Kazhagam
2021	K. S. Masthan	Dravida Munnetra Kazhagam
2026	A. Ganeshkumar	Pattali Makkal Katchi

== Election results ==
Vote share of winning candidates
2026	36.10%
2021	53.58%
2016	43.99%
2011	44.15%
2006	47.98%
2001	51.33%
1996	42.60%
1991	51.75%
1989	42.29%
1984	60.61%
1980	49.92%
1977	36.13%
1971	59.67%
1967	55.59%
1962	51.53%
1957	41.63%
1952	46.55%

=== 2026 ===
2026 Tamil Nadu Legislative Assembly election: Gingee
Party	Candidate	Votes	%	±%
PMK	A. Ganeshkumar	78,201	36.10	▲0.02
DMK	K. S. Masthan	65,556	30.26	▼23.32
TVK	B. Chandrasekaran	61,609	28.44	New
NTK	Adv. E. Krishnan	6,371	2.94	▼1.91
NOTA	NOTA	508	0.23	▼0.88
Margin of victory		12,645	5.84	▼11.66
Turnout		2,16,652	89.16	▲10.71
Registered electors		2,42,992		▼17,796
PMK gain from DMK		Swing	▲0.02	

=== 2021 ===
2021 Tamil Nadu Legislative Assembly election: Gingee
Party	Candidate	Votes	%	±%
DMK	K. S. Masthan	109,625	53.58	+9.59
PMK	P. Rajendiran	73,822	36.08	+21.9
NTK	A. P. Sugumar	9,920	4.85	New
AMMK	A. Gowtham Sagar	4,811	2.35	New
NOTA	NOTA	2,279	1.11	−0.04
MNM	P. Sripathi	2,151	1.05	New
Independent	S. Gopi	1,914	0.94	New
Margin of victory		35,803	17.50	6.53
Turnout		204,601	78.45	−1.51
Rejected ballots		289	0.14	
Registered electors		260,788		
DMK hold		Swing	9.59	

=== 2016 ===
2016 Tamil Nadu Legislative Assembly election: Gingee
Party	Candidate	Votes	%	±%
DMK	K. S. Masthan	88,440	43.99	New
AIADMK	A. Govindasamy	66,383	33.02	New
PMK	A. Ganeshkumar	28,515	14.18	−29.97
MDMK	A. K. Mani	10,672	5.31	New
NOTA	NOTA	2,326	1.16	New
BJP	M. S. Rajendiran	1,443	0.72	−0.06
Independent	K. Loganathan	1,151	0.57	New
Margin of victory		22,057	10.97	9.93
Turnout		201,024	79.96	−1.66
Registered electors		251,396		
DMK gain from PMK		Swing	-0.16	

=== 2011 ===
2011 Tamil Nadu Legislative Assembly election: Gingee
Party	Candidate	Votes	%	±%
PMK	A. Ganeshkumar	77,026	44.15	New
DMDK	R. Sivalingam	75,215	43.12	+33.5
Independent	K. Sivamark	8,627	4.95	New
Independent	C. A. Elumalai	2,962	1.70	New
Independent	Vaithilingam (A) P. Vaithiraja	2,811	1.61	New
IJK	A. Mohan	1,388	0.80	New
BJP	M. S. Rajendiran	1,362	0.78	−0.38
Independent	R. Karunanithi	1,275	0.73	New
Independent	P. Sivalingam	1,082	0.62	New
BSP	M. Paruthipuram Sakkarai	1,010	0.58	−0.22
MMKA	S. Baskariah	1,003	0.57	New
Margin of victory		1,811	1.04	−8.91
Turnout		174,449	81.62	9.10
Registered electors		213,724		
PMK gain from DMK		Swing	-3.83	

=== 2006 ===
2006 Tamil Nadu Legislative Assembly election: Gingee
Party	Candidate	Votes	%	±%
DMK	V. Kannan	62,350	47.98	+22.14
MDMK	Dr. R. Masilamani	49,417	38.03	+18.55
DMDK	D. Rajendran	12,491	9.61	New
Independent	R. Manivannan	1,670	1.29	New
BJP	M. S. Rajenderan	1,509	1.16	New
BSP	G. Kaliyamurthi	1,043	0.80	New
Margin of victory		12,933	9.95	−15.54
Turnout		129,946	72.52	9.73
Registered electors		179,189		
DMK gain from AIADMK		Swing	-3.35	

=== 2001 ===
2001 Tamil Nadu Legislative Assembly election: Gingee
Party	Candidate	Votes	%	±%
AIADMK	V. Elumalai	58,564	51.33	New
DMK	A. Rajendran @ Dheeran	29,478	25.84	−16.77
MDMK	Dr. R. Masilamani	22,228	19.48	+3.18
Independent	M. Denan	2,288	2.01	New
Independent	M. Kasinathan	1,536	1.35	New
Margin of victory		29,086	25.49	4.38
Turnout		114,094	62.79	−8.23
Registered electors		181,823		
AIADMK gain from DMK		Swing	8.73	

=== 1996 ===
1996 Tamil Nadu Legislative Assembly election: Gingee
Party	Candidate	Votes	%	±%
DMK	T. Natarajan	51,327	42.60	+12.02
INC	T. N. Muruganandam	25,893	21.49	−30.26
PMK	V. Elumalai	21,228	17.62	New
MDMK	N. Ramachandran	19,640	16.30	New
Margin of victory		25,434	21.11	−0.06
Turnout		120,477	71.02	2.60
Registered electors		177,082		
DMK gain from INC		Swing	-9.14	

=== 1991 ===
1991 Tamil Nadu Legislative Assembly election: Gingee
Party	Candidate	Votes	%	±%
INC	S. S. R. Eramasass	57,390	51.75	+34.54
DMK	Gingee N. Ramachandran	33,916	30.58	−11.71
PMK	V. Kounder Elumalai	18,178	16.39	New
Independent	G. Iniyadayalan	581	0.52	New
Margin of victory		23,474	21.17	−3.75
Turnout		110,903	68.42	5.40
Registered electors		166,223		
INC gain from DMK		Swing	9.45	

=== 1989 ===
1989 Tamil Nadu Legislative Assembly election: Gingee
Party	Candidate	Votes	%	±%
DMK	Gingee N. Ramachandran	38,415	42.29	+5.54
Independent	V. Ranganathan	15,785	17.38	New
INC	T. M. Murugannadham	15,634	17.21	−43.4
AIADMK	K. Parthasarathy	9,895	10.89	New
AIADMK	G. Krishnasmy	8,443	9.30	New
Independent	G. Iniyadayalan	989	1.09	New
Independent	C. Balarama Gounder	640	0.70	New
Independent	R. Kasirajan	576	0.63	New
Margin of victory		22,630	24.91	1.06
Turnout		90,830	63.02	−9.99
Registered electors		148,045		
DMK gain from INC		Swing	-18.32	

=== 1984 ===
1984 Tamil Nadu Legislative Assembly election: Gingee
Party	Candidate	Votes	%	±%
INC	T. N. Muruganandam	56,156	60.61	New
DMK	Gingee N. Ramachandran	34,054	36.76	−13.16
Independent	R. Munusamy	1,304	1.41	New
Independent	G. Iniyadayalan	559	0.60	New
Margin of victory		22,102	23.86	21.90
Turnout		92,647	73.01	4.88
Registered electors		132,058		
INC gain from DMK		Swing	10.70	

=== 1980 ===
1980 Tamil Nadu Legislative Assembly election: Gingee
Party	Candidate	Votes	%	±%
DMK	Gingee N. Ramachandran	41,708	49.92	+13.78
AIADMK	G. Krishnasamy	40,075	47.96	+16.64
Independent	M. Subramaniyan Gounder	636	0.76	New
Independent	N. Ganesan	467	0.56	New
Margin of victory		1,633	1.95	−2.86
Turnout		83,558	68.13	2.01
Registered electors		124,732		
DMK hold		Swing	13.78	

=== 1977 ===
1977 Tamil Nadu Legislative Assembly election: Gingee
Party	Candidate	Votes	%	±%
DMK	Gingee N. Ramachandran	26,971	36.13	−23.54
AIADMK	G. Krishnaswamy	23,381	31.32	New
INC	V. Munuswamy	14,186	19.00	−21.32
JP	C. Subramania Kounder	6,922	9.27	New
Independent	S. P. Kesavan	1,869	2.50	New
Independent	K. Loganathan	741	0.99	New
Independent	A. S. Basheer	574	0.77	New
Margin of victory		3,590	4.81	−14.54
Turnout		74,644	66.12	−6.49
Registered electors		114,821		
DMK hold		Swing	-23.54	

=== 1971 ===
1971 Tamil Nadu Legislative Assembly election: Gingee
Party	Candidate	Votes	%	±%
DMK	S. Sagadeva Gounder	39,397	59.67	+4.08
INC	V. Perumal Nainar	26,625	40.33	+1.07
Margin of victory		12,772	19.35	3.01
Turnout		66,022	72.61	−5.36
Registered electors		97,534		
DMK hold		Swing	4.08	

=== 1967 ===
1967 Madras Legislative Assembly election: Gingee
Party	Candidate	Votes	%	±%
DMK	V. Munusami	39,517	55.59	New
INC	G. Rajaram	27,905	39.26	−12.28
Independent	P. R. Aranganathan	1,592	2.24	New
Independent	K. Lourdunathan	793	1.12	New
Independent	A. Erusan	747	1.05	New
Independent	P. Saminathan	532	0.75	New
Margin of victory		11,612	16.34	13.27
Turnout		71,086	77.97	11.93
Registered electors		94,916		
DMK gain from INC		Swing	4.06	

=== 1962 ===
1962 Madras Legislative Assembly election: Gingee
Party	Candidate	Votes	%	±%
INC	Rajaram	29,235	51.53	+26.18
SWA	Aranganathan	27,494	48.47	New
Margin of victory		1,741	3.07	−5.54
Turnout		56,729	66.04	16.85
Registered electors		89,586		
INC gain from Independent		Swing	9.91	

=== 1957 ===
1957 Madras Legislative Assembly election: Gingee
Party	Candidate	Votes	%	±%
Independent	M. Jangal Reddiar	18,016	41.63	New
Independent	V. Gopal Goundar	14,291	33.02	New
INC	Pachaiappa Naicker	10,971	25.35	−15.48
Margin of victory		3,725	8.61	2.88
Turnout		43,278	49.19	−7.73
Registered electors		87,980		
Independent gain from TTP		Swing	-4.92	

=== 1952 ===
1952 Madras Legislative Assembly election: Gingee
Party	Candidate	Votes	%	±%
TTP	Aranganathan	16,918	46.55	New
INC	K. Ramakrishnaswamy Pillai	14,837	40.83	New
Independent	Perianna Gunder	2,818	7.75	New
CPI	Narayanaswami Naidu	1,769	4.87	New
Margin of victory		2,081	5.73	
Turnout		36,342	56.92	
Registered electors		63,849		
TTP win (new seat)				
