= Andimadam Assembly constituency =

Former legislative Assembly constituency in Andhra Pradesh, India

Coordinates: 11°20′7″N 79°22′33″E

Andimadam
- Former constituency for the Tamil Nadu Legislative Assembly

Constituency details
- Country: India
- Region: South India
- State: Tamil Nadu
- District: Ariyalur
- Lok Sabha constituency: Chidambaram
- Established: 1967
- Abolished: 2008
- Total electors: 1,44,606
- Reservation: None

Andimadam was one of the 234 constituencies in the Tamil Nadu Legislative Assembly of Tamil Nadu, a southern state of India. It was in Chidambaram Lok Sabha constituency and Ariyalur district.

== Members of the Legislative Assembly ==
Assembly	Duration	Winner	Party
Fourth	1967-71	K. N. Ramachandran	Dravida Munnetra Kazhagam
Fifth	1971-77	S. Sadasiva Padayachi	Dravida Munnetra Kazhagam
Sixth	1977-80	T. Subramanian	All India Anna Dravida Munnetra Kazhagam
Seventh	1980-84	S. Krishnamoorthy	All India Anna Dravida Munnetra Kazhagam
Eighth	1984-89	Adhimoolam	All India Anna Dravida Munnetra Kazhagam
Ninth	1989-91	S. Sivasubramanian	Dravida Munnetra Kazhagam
Tenth	1991-96	K. R. Thangaraju	Indian National Congress
Eleventh	1996-01	Rajendiran	Pattali Makkal Katchi
Twelfth	2001-06	J. Gurunathan	Pattali Makkal Katchi
Thirteenth	2006-2011	S. S. Sivasankar	Dravida Munnetra Kazhagam

In the 2011 election, Andimadam Assembly constituency merged with Jayankondam and Kunnam constituencies.

== Election results ==
Vote share of winning candidates
2006	45.30%
2001	59.41%
1996	47.48%
1991	42.19%
1989	48.01%
1984	52.92%
1980	50.49%
1977	56.45%
1971	53.05%
1967	48.25%

=== 2006 ===
2006 Tamil Nadu Legislative Assembly election: Andimadam
Party	Candidate	Votes	%	±%
DMK	S. S. Sivasankar	51,395	45.30%	9.98%
AIADMK	K. Pannerselvam	45,567	40.16%	
DMDK	M. Pannerselvam	10,954	9.65%	
BJP	M. Rajasekaran	1,608	1.42%	
Independent	K. Mathiyazhagan	1,501	1.32%	
BSP	K. Sekar	912	0.80%	−0.05%
Independent	V. R. Azhagesan	840	0.74%	
Independent	M. K. Subramaniyan	683	0.60%	
Margin of victory		5,828	5.14%	−18.96%
Turnout		113,460	78.46%	7.45%
Registered electors		144,606		
DMK gain from PMK		Swing	-14.11%	

=== 2001 ===
2001 Tamil Nadu Legislative Assembly election: Andimadam
Party	Candidate	Votes	%	±%
PMK	J. Guru Alias Gurunathan	66,576	59.41%	
DMK	M. Gnanamoorthy	39,574	35.31%	0.60%
MDMK	R. Veerapandiyan	2,869	2.56%	−0.80%
Independent	D. Balakrishnan	1,651	1.47%	
BSP	K. Sekar	956	0.85%	
Independent	P. Subramanian	440	0.39%	
Margin of victory		27,002	24.09%	11.33%
Turnout		112,066	71.01%	−5.99%
Registered electors		157,834		
PMK hold		Swing	11.93%	

=== 1996 ===
1996 Tamil Nadu Legislative Assembly election: Andimadam
Party	Candidate	Votes	%	±%
PMK	Rajendiran @ Deeran	49,853	47.48%	
DMK	Sivasubramaniyan	36,451	34.72%	11.98%
INC	Arthur Hellar	13,779	13.12%	−29.06%
MDMK	Ramalingam	3,526	3.36%	
Independent	Arumugham	567	0.54%	
Independent	Karunanidhi	257	0.24%	
Independent	Marimuthu	179	0.17%	
Independent	Gopal	140	0.13%	
Independent	Annadurai	125	0.12%	
Independent	Rajendiran	118	0.11%	
Margin of victory		13,402	12.76%	4.83%
Turnout		104,995	77.00%	0.29%
Registered electors		143,942		
PMK gain from INC		Swing	5.29%	

=== 1991 ===
1991 Tamil Nadu Legislative Assembly election: Andimadam
Party	Candidate	Votes	%	±%
INC	K. R. Thangaraju	40,816	42.19%	26.16%
PMK	M. Gnanamoorthy	33,144	34.26%	
DMK	S. Sivasubramanian	21,996	22.73%	−25.28%
THMM	S. Selladurai	649	0.67%	
Independent	P. Antony	146	0.15%	
Margin of victory		7,672	7.93%	−15.37%
Turnout		96,751	76.71%	25.69%
Registered electors		132,570		
INC gain from DMK		Swing	-5.83%	

=== 1989 ===
1989 Tamil Nadu Legislative Assembly election: Andimadam
Party	Candidate	Votes	%	±%
DMK	S. Sivasubramanian	28,500	48.01%	2.34%
AIADMK	A. Elavarasan	14,669	24.71%	−28.21%
INC	K. Viswanathan	9,511	16.02%	
Independent	R. Ramakrishnan	3,292	5.55%	
Independent	P. Panneerselvam	2,199	3.70%	
Independent	C. Govindasamy	417	0.70%	
Independent	C. Palanivel	236	0.40%	
Independent	K. Sheik Allavudeen	111	0.19%	
Independent	M. Kolanjinathan	111	0.19%	
Independent	K. Valambal	101	0.17%	
Independent	A. S. Velmurugan	97	0.16%	
Margin of victory		13,831	23.30%	16.05%
Turnout		59,357	51.02%	−29.01%
Registered electors		118,892		
DMK gain from AIADMK		Swing	-4.91%	

=== 1984 ===
1984 Tamil Nadu Legislative Assembly election: Andimadam
Party	Candidate	Votes	%	±%
AIADMK	Adhimoolam Alias Gandhi	43,911	52.92%	2.43%
DMK	S. Sivasubramanian	37,895	45.67%	−3.83%
Independent	Solai Natesan	376	0.45%	
Independent	K. Renganayaki	255	0.31%	
Independent	E. Jesubalan	235	0.28%	
Independent	S. Rajamanickam	157	0.19%	
Independent	M . Anthonisamy	140	0.17%	
Margin of victory		6,016	7.25%	6.26%
Turnout		82,969	80.03%	8.55%
Registered electors		107,898		
AIADMK hold		Swing	2.43%	

=== 1980 ===
1980 Tamil Nadu Legislative Assembly election: Andimadam
Party	Candidate	Votes	%	±%
AIADMK	S. Krishnamoorthy	36,120	50.49%	−5.96%
DMK	S. Sivasubramanian	35,412	49.51%	15.75%
Margin of victory		708	0.99%	−21.71%
Turnout		71,532	71.48%	1.41%
Registered electors		101,568		
AIADMK hold		Swing	-5.96%	

=== 1977 ===
1977 Tamil Nadu Legislative Assembly election: Andimadam
Party	Candidate	Votes	%	±%
AIADMK	T. Subramanian	36,885	56.45%	
DMK	S. Sivasubramanian	22,056	33.76%	−19.29%
CPI	K. Palamalai	3,428	5.25%	
JP	P. Gopalakrishan	2,446	3.74%	
Independent	E. K. Manickam	522	0.80%	
Margin of victory		14,829	22.70%	16.59%
Turnout		65,337	70.07%	−8.71%
Registered electors		94,718		
AIADMK gain from DMK		Swing	3.40%	

=== 1971 ===
1971 Tamil Nadu Legislative Assembly election: Andimadam
Party	Candidate	Votes	%	±%
DMK	S. Sadasiva Padayachi	39,313	53.05%	4.80%
INC	G. Thiyagarajan	34,790	46.95%	7.20%
Margin of victory		4,523	6.10%	−2.40%
Turnout		74,103	78.78%	0.43%
Registered electors		96,529		
DMK hold		Swing	4.80%	

=== 1967 ===
1967 Madras Legislative Assembly election: Andimadam
Party	Candidate	Votes	%	±%
DMK	K. N. Ramachandran	32,253	48.25%	
INC	M. S. T. Pandayachi	26,570	39.75%	
Independent	A. S. Kurukkal	8,023	12.00%	
Margin of victory		5,683	8.50%	
Turnout		66,846	78.34%	
Registered electors		89,510		
DMK win (new seat)				
