= S. Lakshmanan =

S. Lakshmanan may refer to:

- S. Lakshmanan (politician, born 1972)
- S. Lakshmanan (politician, born 1968)

== See also ==
- A. L. S. Lakshmanan
