= K. Rajendran =

Indian politician

K. Rajendran was elected to the Tamil Nadu Legislative Assembly from the Jayankondam constituency in the 2006 election. He was a candidate of the All India Anna Dravida Munnetra Kazhagam (ADMK) party.
