= S. Sivasubramanian =

Indian politician (died 2019)

S. Sivasubramanian (10 September 1937 – 14 June 2019, Ariyalur, India) was an Indian politician and former Member of the Legislative Assembly of Tamil Nadu. Sivasubramanian was elected to the Tamil Nadu legislative assembly as a Dravida Munnetra Kazhagam candidate from Andimadam constituency in 1989 election. Sivasubramanian also served as member of parliament in upper house.
