= Kaduvetti Guru =

Former Politician from Tamil Nadu, India

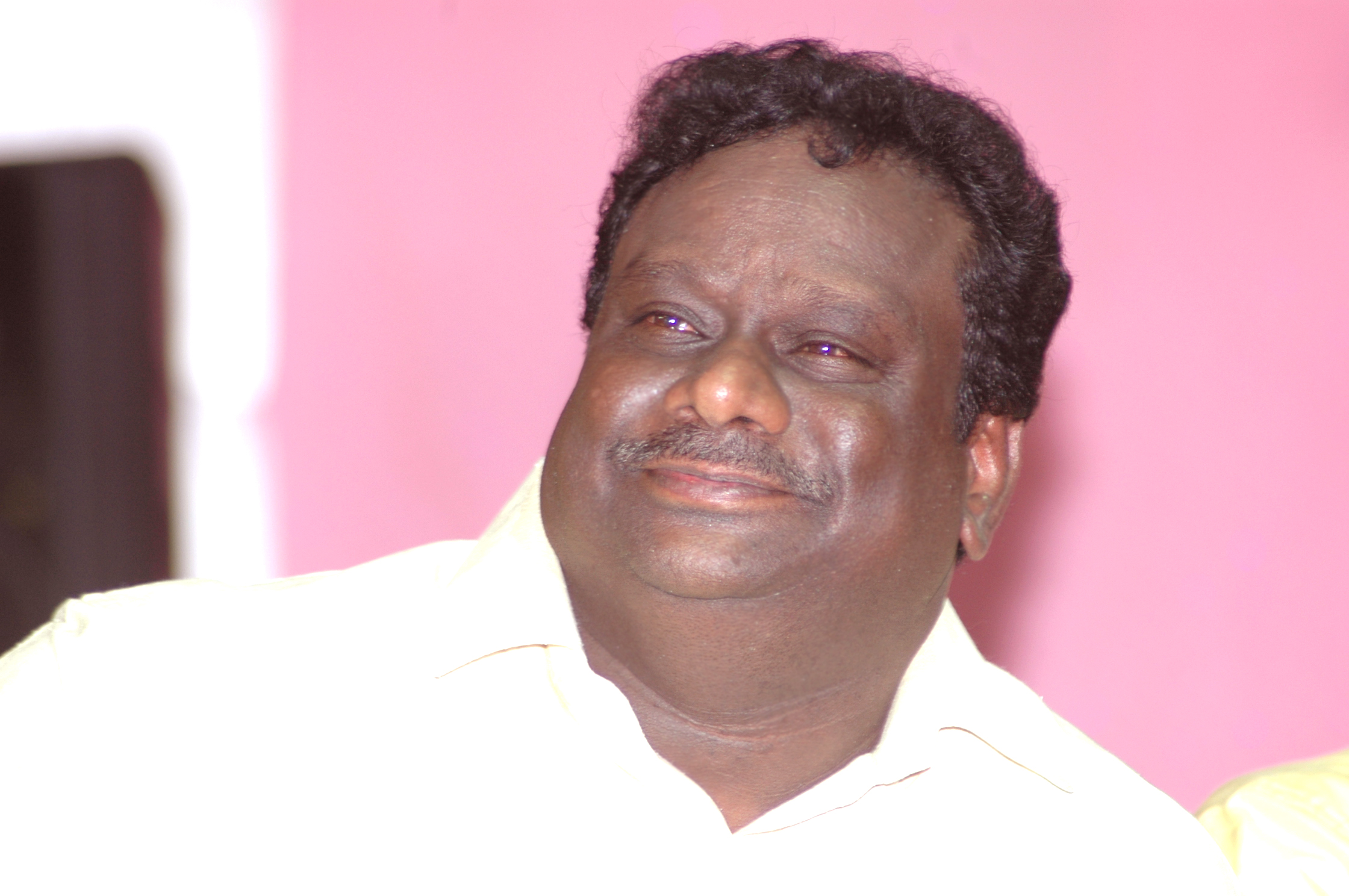

Member of the Tamil Nadu Legislative Assembly
- In office 13 May 2001 – 11 May 2006
- Preceded by: Rajendiran
- Succeeded by: S. S. Sivasankar
- Constituency: Andimadam
- In office 13 May 2011 – 19 May 2016
- Preceded by: K. Rajendran
- Succeeded by: J. K. N. Ramajeyalingam
- Constituency: Jayankondam

Personal details
- Born: Jayaraman Gurunathan; 1 February 1961 Kaduvetti, Jayankondam, Udayarpalayam taluk, Ariyalur district, Tamil Nadu
- Died: May 25, 2018 (aged 57) Chennai, Tamil Nadu, India
- Party: Pattali Makkal Katchi
- Spouse: Latha
- Children: Viruthambigai; Kanalarasan
- Parent(s): Jayaraman; Kalyani

J. Guru (born Jayaraman Gurunathan; 1 February 1961 – 25 May 2018), also known as Kaduvetti Guru, was an Indian politician who was twice elected as a Member of the Legislative Assembly in Tamil Nadu. He was the president of the Vanniyar Sangam, a caste-based organization that represented the interests of the Vanniyar community.

Guru was known for his inflammatory speeches and faced several legal cases.

== Personal life ==
Gurunathan was born as Jayaraman Gurunathan on 1 February 1961 in Kaduvetti, a small village near Jayankondam in Ariyalur district, Tamil Nadu to R. Jayaraman and Kalyani. He belonged to the Vanniyar community, which is found throughout Northern Tamil Nadu. He died on 25 May 2018, at the age of 57, in a private hospital, and is survived by a son and daughter. He had been suffering from interstitial lung disease for several months, and underwent a tracheotomy.

Following Guru's death, members of the Vanniyar caste were accused of attacking 100 government buses across Tamil Nadu, and of forcing shops to close due to people being injured by stones being thrown.

== Political career ==
Gurunathan joined the Vanniyar Sangam caste organisation as a cadre in 1980 and rose through the ranks to become president in the early 2000s.

Also known as Gurunathan, Guru represented the Pattali Makkal Katchi (PMK) party that had been formed from the Vanniyar Sangam.

After an unsuccessful attempt to win a seat in the Tamil Nadu Legislative Assembly in 1996, Gurunathan was elected as a PMK candidate from Andimadam constituency in the 2001 elections. He lost the contest for the Jayankondam constituency in the 2006 elections but won the seat in the 2011 elections. His attempt to defend it in the 2016 elections resulted in him coming second to J. K. N. Ramajeyalingam of the All India Anna Dravida Munnetra Kazhagam.

Comments by Gurunathan against various Dravida Munnetra Kazhagam (DMK) ministers in June 2008 caused the DMK to end its alliance with the PMK, although the relationship had been difficult for some time previously. Guru was arrested and imprisoned on remand in July on suspicion of attempted murder. The PMK founder, S. Ramadoss, protested the arrest, claiming it was part of a political vendetta. The detention order, which had been made under the National Security Act and upheld by the Madras High Court was revoked in November of that year, with conditions attached that included he posted bail in the two outstanding cases against him, including the alleged attempted murder, and that he desisted from making inflammatory speeches.

When Guru stood in the Tiruvannamalai constituency in the 2009 general elections, he suffered a record defeat as the DMK targeted PMK candidates after the break-up of the alliance.

Kaduvetti Guru lodged a complaint to Police Commissioner in February 2012, seeking the arrest of Dinamalar editor Krishnamurthy and its publisher Lakshmipathy for publishing news insulting the Vanniyar caste and trying to create caste violence.

In his controversial 2012 speech, Guru had reportedly said that in case of an inter-caste marriage, the groom should be killed. A few days after his virulent speech, around 250 houses of Dalits were burnt down in Dharmapuri following a love marriage. Gurunathan is said to have fomented tension between Vanniyars and Dalits by publicly condemning marriages between the two. J Guru, allegedly called upon the community to “chop off the limbs” of anyone who falls in love with Vanniyar women.

== Legal issues ==
Guru was acquitted in the 2008 attempted murder case in 2010 due to lack of evidence. At the time of the 2011 state assembly elections, Guru and Bharatiya Janata Party candidate M. Muruganandam were noted as having the most outstanding cases of all the candidates, with nine each. Guru — whose cases mostly related to allegations of attempted murder, damage to public property and speeches inciting racial hatred — protested that he had never lost a case and has a clear conscience.

There were further legal problems in 2012, when he was cited under the Indian Penal Code by the police for unlawful assembly and riot in relation to a speech he allegedly delivered at Thazhambur, Kancheepuram district. Furthermore, a speech at the Chithirai festival in Mamallapuram resulted in his 2013 arrest under the National Security Act.

At the time of the 2016 state assembly elections, there were 18 police cases pending against Guru, of which charges had been pressed in six. This was the greatest number filed against any candidate, with the combined total for all candidates being 324.

== Controversy over death ==
In March 2019, Kaduvetti Guru's son, Kanalarasan, his sister and his mother had a press conference. The family claimed that Guru's death was not natural; Gurunathan was being held as a circumstantial prisoner and was seen as an obstacle to the growth of Anbumani. Guru's mother said her son could have been saved if he had been treated properly. The family said that the PMK high command claimed he would die and does not need treatment and said that the family was not permitted to accompany Gurunathan for treatment by the PMK high command and also said that the PMK high command wanted Kaduvetti Gurunathan dead for 30 years. They also said that the Vanniyar community would give a befitting reply to PMK.

His son Kanalarasan claimed that his family has been targeted by thugs after his sister married against the wishes of party founder S Ramadoss. He said that his sister was married hastily because a group of people planned to kidnap and rape her and force her to marry a relative of S. Ramadoss. He claims that they do not allow them to live peacefully and are attempting to drive them out of their house. He also claims that bribe has been offered to the family in order to keep them silent.

In May 2020, PMK functionaries, attacked the son, son in law and relatives of J Guru with lethal weapons.

== Legacy ==
“Maaveeran J Guru Vanniyar Sangam" was formed in February 2019 and said it will oppose Anbumani Ramadoss in the 2019 Lok Sabha elections. The blatant sidelining and humiliation and harassment of family members of Guru, who till his demise was the president has led to this situation, declared Vengai Ayyanar, the coordinator.
