= P. Govindan =

Indian politician

P. Govindan is an Indian politician and was a Member of the Legislative Assembly of Tamil Nadu. He was elected to the Tamil Nadu legislative assembly as a Pattali Makkal Katchi (PMK) candidate from Taramangalam constituency in the 1996 election. He did not gain the party's nomination for the 2001 state assembly elections, with his constituency being contested instead by P. N. Gunasekaran. He was expelled from the party in 2006 for allegedly working against its candidate in Taramangalam during the campaign for the elections of that year.
