= K. R. Thangaraju =

Indian politician

K. R. Thangaraju is an Indian politician and former Member of the Legislative Assembly of Tamil Nadu. He was elected to the Tamil Nadu legislative assembly as an Indian National Congress candidate from Andimadam constituency in 1991 election. In 2024, he joined the Bharatiya Janata Party in the presence of Tamil Nadu BJP chief K. Annamalai and Rajeev Chandrasekhar.
