= V. Kannan =

Indian politician

V. Kannan was elected to the Tamil Nadu Legislative Assembly from the Gingee constituency in the 2006 election. He was a candidate of the Dravida Munnetra Kazhagam (DMK) party.
