= S. Semmalai =

Indian politician

Member of Tamil Nadu legislative assembly
- In office 2016–2021
- Constituency: Mettur (state assembly constituency)
- In office 1980–1989
- Constituency: Taramangalam
- In office 2001–2006
- Constituency: Omalur

Member of Parliament Salem (Lok Sabha constituency)
- In office 25 June 2009 – 25 June 2014

Minister of Health and Education (Government of Tamilnadu)
- In office 2001–2004

Personal details
- Party: Tamilaga Vettri Kazhagam (30 September 2026–Present)
- Other political affiliations: AIADMK (Before September 2026)

S. Semmalai is an Indian politician active in Tamil Nadu. He is the incumbent member of the state legislative assembly (MLA) from Mettur constituency. He has been elected four times to the Tamil Nadu state assembly and once to the national parliament of India (2009–14).

== Career ==
Semmalai has won four elections in his career spanning from 1980 to the present.

- In 1980, he won his first ever election. Semmalai was elected to the Tamil Nadu legislative assembly from Taramangalam constituency as an Independent candidate in the 1980 election. He won as an independent candidate, that is, not belonging to any political party, and this is a rare achievement.
- He later joined the Anna Dravida Munnetra Kazhagam and was elected to the state assembly on a ticket of that party from the same Taramangalam constituency in the 1984 election.
- His career from 1989 to 2001 is not properly known.
- In 2001, he was elected from Omalur constituency as an Anna Dravida Munnetra Kazhagam candidate in the 2001 Tamil Nadu state assembly election.
- In 2009, he was elected a member of parliament (the 15th Lok Sabha, 2009–14) from the Salem Constituency on an Anna Dravida Munnetra Kazhagam ticket.
- In 2016, he was elected from Mettur constituency as an Anna Dravida Munnetra Kazhagam candidate in the 2016 Tamil Nadu state assembly election. * He served as acting speaker of the Tamil Nadu Legislative Assembly in 2016.
- On September 30, 2026, he joined Tamilaga Vettri Kazhagam At Dharapuram ByElection Rally.
