= Pattali Makkal Katchi =

- President: Anbumani Ramadoss
- General Secretary: Vadivel Ravanan
- Treasurer: M. Thilagambama
- Founder: S. Ramadoss
- Founded: 16 July 1989 (37 years ago)
- Headquarters: Tindivanam, Villupuram District, Chennai - 604001, Tamil Nadu
- Ideology: Casteism; Conservatism; Right-wing populism
- Political position: Right-wing
- ECI status: Unrecognised Party
- Alliance: National Alliance NDA: (1998–2001, 2002–2003, 2014–2016, 2019–2024, 2026–present); Regional Alliances AIADMK-led Alliance: (1998–1999, 2001–2002, 2009–2011, 2019–2024, 2026–present); Former Alliances: UPA (2004–2009, 2011–2014) (National); DPA (2006–2009, 2011–2014) (Tamil Nadu); PMK-Led Alliance (1989–1996) (Tamil Nadu)
- Seats in Rajya Sabha: 1 / 245
- Seats in Lok Sabha: 0 / 543
- Seats in Tamil Nadu Legislative Assembly: 4 / 234

Election symbol
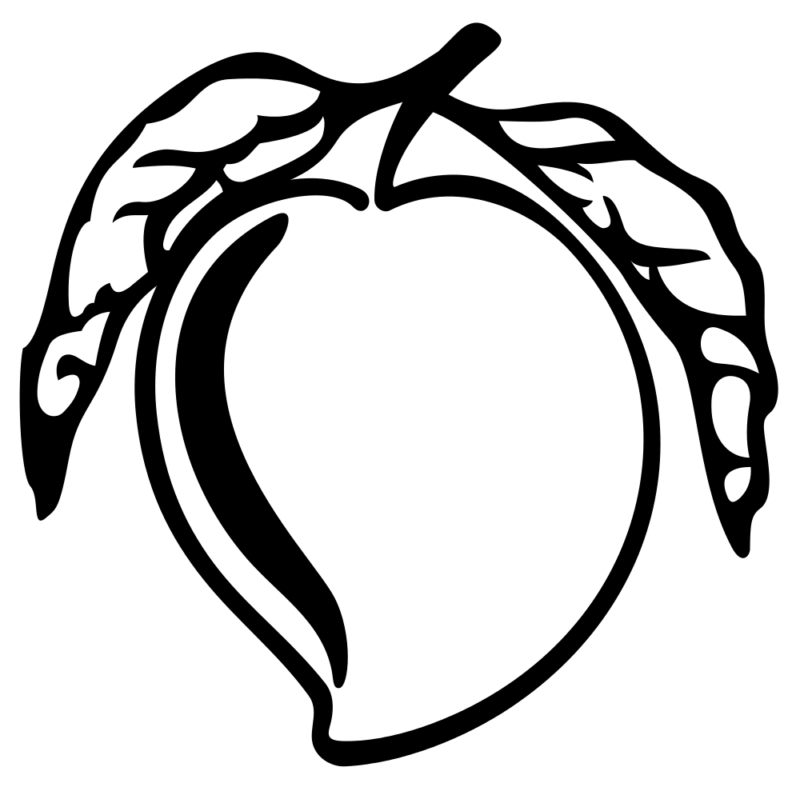
- Ripe Mango

Party flag

Website
- pmkofficial.com

The Pattali Makkal Katchi (transl. Proletarian People's Party; abbreviated as PMK) is a political party in Tamil Nadu, India. It was founded by Dr. S. Ramadoss in 1989 to provide political representation for the Vanniyar caste, a community found throughout northern Tamil Nadu. It is a part of the BJP-led National Democratic Alliance (NDA). Its symbol is a mango. As of 2025, it is currently led by Dr. Anbumani Ramadoss following a months long dispute that resulted in his father, Dr. S. Ramadoss, forming a splinter faction of the PMK, which ended in 2026 after both reuniting.

== History ==
=== Vanniyar Sangam ===
S. Ramadoss founded the Vanniyar Sangam in 1980, bringing together a coalition of Vanniyar caste organisations. The Vanniyar Sangam is PMK's parent organisation that organised the 1987 Vanniyar reservation agitation, demanding Most Backward Caste (MBC) status for Vanniyars. At the peak of the protests, the state was paralysed for a week when thousands of trees were cut down, highways were blocked and damaged, and more than 1,400 houses belonging to members of the Dalit community were torched. The police shot 21 protestors. Later, in 1989, the DMK government led by then-Chief Minister M. Karunanidhi granted MBC status to the Vanniyars, with the associated reservation entitlements in education and employment.

=== PMK (1989–present) ===
Ramadoss founded the PMK on 16 July 1989, emerging from the Vanniyar reservation protests of 1987.

Ahead of the 2004 elections, PMK joined the Democratic Progressive Alliance, a broad Tamil political coalition which also included the DMK, Indian National Congress (INC), Communist Party of India, Communist Party of India (Marxist) and Indian Union Muslim League. The party was able to obtain a significant share of power both in the regional government in Tamil Nadu and the Central Government due to the number of seats it won which helped the United Progressive Alliance (UPA-I) form the Government.

Following the 2004 Lok Sabha elections, the PMK joined the United Progressive Alliance led by the INC. In June 2008, during the final months of the bitter relationship between the DMK and the PMK, the ruling DMK in Tamil Nadu severed its ties with the PMK, who were outside supporters of the Karunanidhi Government. However, the DMK did not press for the party's removal from the UPA Government at the centre. On 26 March 2009, PMK declared that, it would join the All India Anna Dravida Munnetra Kazhagam (AIADMK) led front and left the United Progressive Alliance (UPA).

Ramadoss and his son, Anbumani Ramdoss, were arrested by the Jayalalithaa government for their inflammatory speeches, the PMK cadres indulged in violence in April 2013 causing property damages estimated worth ₹600 crores. Jayalalithaa likened the party to a “terrorist” organization and claimed they hurled petrol bombs on moving vehicles and caused damages to 850 vehicles including public buses and threatened to ban the party. Ramadoss and his son were released after 12 days in prison.

PMK contested in the 2014 Lok Sabha election in an alliance with BJP-led NDA and its candidate Anbumani Ramadoss won the Dharmapuri Lok Sabha constituency, he was one of two non-AIADMK MPs from Tamil Nadu the other being from its ally BJP.

PMK continued its alliance with AIADMK and BJP in the 2019 Indian general election in Tamil Nadu and contested 7 seats but the party failed to win any seats.

PMK again contested seats in the 2024 Lok Sabha election, fielding 10 candidates across 10 separate constituencies. But the party failed to win any seats.

The Madras Institute of Developmental Studies (MIDS) and an reported that the PMK and the Hindu Munnani was involved in the 2019 Ponparappi violence where Dalit women were sexually abused and Dalit houses were attacked and damaged. An NGO Evidence also blamed PMK in the violence because the Dalit colony voted overwhelmingly for VCK.

In November 2020, Ramadoss called for a protest demanding 20% internal reservation for Vanniyars in the MBC category in education and jobs from 1 December. During the pro-reservation protests, more than 500 PMK cadres pelted stones on a moving train and blocked traffic when they were blocked from entering Chennai. A bill to create the 10.5% internal reservation to Vanniyars was passed on February 26, 2021, by the AIADMK government. The move was taken ahead of the April 6 assembly elections to appease the PMK, which had threatened to quit the coalition if their demand was not satisfied. In July 2021, the DMK government issued an order to implement 10.5% quota Bill for Vanniyars.

PMK contested in 23 seats in the AIADMK alliance in the 2021 Tamil Nadu Legislative Assembly election and won five seats by securing 4.04%. In the assembly, PMK voted in favour of anti-CAA and anti-farm-law resolutions, but AIADMK and BJP walked out over the matter. PMK left the AIADMK-led alliance for the 2021 local body polls.

== Ideology and political positions ==
The PMK defied Tamil Nadu's Dravidian political culture by explicitly appealing to its caste identification when asking for support. The party has been linked to direct action and protests that have resulted in violence. Between 2012 and 2013, the party ran a campaign against intercaste marriages.

== Current office bearers and prominent members ==
The leaders of Pattali Makkal Katchi, who are also the national executives of the party, are listed below:

National Executive
S.No	Member	Party Position
1.	S. Ramadoss	Founder of PMK
2.	Anbumani Ramadoss	President of PMK
3.	Vadivel Ravanan	General Secretary of PMK
4.	M. Thilagabama	Treasurer of PMK

== List of party leaders ==
=== Party Presidents ===
No.	Portrait	Name (Birth–Death)	Term in office		
No.	Portrait	Name (Birth–Death)	Assumed office	Left office	Time in office
1		Dheeran (unknown)	16 July 1989	31 December 1997	8 years, 168 days
2		G.K. Mani (1952–)	31 December 1997	28 May 2022	24 years, 148 days
3		Anbumani Ramadoss (1968–)	28 May 2022	Incumbent	4 years, 157 days

=== Party Honanary Presidents ===
No.	Portrait	Name (Birth–Death)	Term in office		
No.	Portrait	Name (Birth–Death)	Assumed office	Left office	Time in office
1		G.K. Mani (1952–)	28 May 2022	26 December 2025	3 years, 212 days

== List of Union Ministers ==
No.	Portrait	Minister (Birth-Death) Constituency	Term of office			Portfolio	Ministry	Prime Minister
No.	Portrait	Minister (Birth-Death) Constituency	From	To	Period	Portfolio	Ministry	Prime Minister
1		Dalit Ezhilmalai (1945–2020); MP for Chidambaram [MoS(I/C)]	20 March 1998	14 August 1999	1 year, 147 days	Minister of Health and Family Welfare	Vajpayee II	Atal Bihari Vajpayee
2		N. T. Shanmugam; MP for Vellore [MoS(I/C)]	13 October 1999	27 May 2000	227 days	Minister of Health and Family Welfare	Vajpayee III	Atal Bihari Vajpayee
2		N. T. Shanmugam; MP for Vellore [MoS(I/C)]	27 May 2000	7 February 2001	256 days	Ministry of Coal	Vajpayee III	Atal Bihari Vajpayee
2		N. T. Shanmugam; MP for Vellore [MoS(I/C)]	1 July 2002	15 January 2004	1 year, 198 days	Ministry of Food Processing Industries	Vajpayee III	Atal Bihari Vajpayee
3		A. K. Moorthy (born 1964); MP for Chengalpattu	1 July 2002	15 January 2004	1 year, 198 days	MoS in Ministry of Railways	Vajpayee III	Atal Bihari Vajpayee
4		E. Ponnuswamy (born 1936); MP for Chidambaram	13 October 1999	7 February 2001	1 year, 117 days	MoS in Ministry of Petroleum & Natural Gas	Vajpayee III	Atal Bihari Vajpayee
5		Anbumani Ramadoss (born 1968); Rajya Sabha MP for Tamil Nadu	23 May 2004	29 March 2009	4 years, 310 days	Ministry of Health & Family Welfare	Manmohan I	Manmohan Singh
6		R. Velu (born 1940); MP for Arakkonam	23 May 2004	29 March 2009	4 years, 310 days	MoS in Ministry of Railways	Manmohan I	Manmohan Singh

== Election history ==
=== Tamil Nadu Legislative Assembly ===
Election Year	Assembly	Seats contested	Seats won	Overall votes	(%) of votes	(+/-) in seats	Vote swing	Outcome
Tamil Nadu Legislative Assembly
1991	10th	194	1 / 234	14,52,982	5.89%	▲1	new	Others
1996	11th	116	4 / 234	14,52,982	3.84%	▲3	▼2.05	Others
2001	12th	27	20 / 234	15,57,500	5.56%	▲16	▲1.72	Government
2006	13th	31	18 / 234	18,63,749	5.65%	▼2	▲0.09	Government
2011	14th	30	3 / 234	19,27,783	5.23%	▼15	▼0.42	Opposition
2016	15th	232	0 / 234	23,00,558	5.32%	▼3	▼0.06	Others
2021	16th	23	5 / 234	17,58,774	3.80%	▲5	▼1.52	Opposition
2026	17th	18	4 / 234	10,70,745	2.17%	▼1	▼1.63	Opposition

All time–PMK Tamil Nadu Legislative Assembly seat count

=== Lok Sabha (Tamil Nadu) ===
Year	Lok Sabha	Seats contested	Seats won	(+/-) in seats	% of votes	Vote swing	Popular vote	Alliance	Outcome
1989	9th	32	0 / 39	New entry	5.82%	New entry	15,36,350	PMK	Lost
1991	10th	31	0 / 39	Steady	5.14%	▼0.68	12,69,690	PMK	Lost
1996	11th	15	0 / 39	Steady	2.03%	▼3.11	5,52,118	PMK+	Lost
1998	12th	5	4 / 39	▲4	6.05%	▲4.02	15,48,976	NDA	Government
1999	13th	7	5 / 39	▲1	8.21%	▲2.16	22,36,821	NDA	Government
2004	14th	5	5 / 39	Steady	6.71%	▼1.50	19,27,367	UPA	Government
2009	15th	6	0 / 39	▼5	5.71%	▼1.00	17,36,000	UNPA	Lost
2014	16th	8	1 / 39	▲1	4.51%	▼1.20	18,04,812	NDA	Government
2019	17th	7	0 / 39	▼1	5.29%	▲0.78	22,97,431	NDA	Lost
2024	18th	10	0 / 39	Steady	4.33%	▼0.96	18,79,689	NDA	Lost

All time–PMK Lok Sabha seat count

=== Puducherry Legislative Assembly ===
Year	Assembly	Seats contested	Seats won	(+/-) in seats	% of votes	Vote swing	Popular vote	Alliance	Outcome
1990	8th	24	0 / 30	New entry	6.38%	New entry	26,820	PMK	Lost
1991	9th	13	0 / 30	Steady	2.92%	▼3.46	11,402	PMK	Lost
1996	10th	5	1 / 30	▲1	2.51%	▼0.41	11,544	PMK	Opposition
2001	11th	10	0 / 30	▼1	7.71%	▲5.20	36,788	ADMK+	Lost
2006	12th	2	2 / 30	▲2	3.80%	▼3.91	21,507	UPA	Government
2011	13th	2	0 / 30	▼2	2.48%	▼1.32	17,342	UPA	Lost
2016	14th	24	0 / 30	Steady	0.71%	▼1.77	5,666	PMK	Lost
2021	15th	Did Not Contest Election to support NDA							
2026	16th	19	0 / 30	Steady	0.12%	▼0.59	1,057	PMK	Lost

=== Puducherry Lok Sabha ===
Year	Lok Sabha	Seats won	(+/-) in seats	% of votes	Vote swing	Popular vote	Candidate	Alliance	Outcome
1989	9th	0 / 1	New entry	6.63%	New entry	25,021	Bavany Maduracayy	PMK	Lost
1991	10th	0 / 1	Steady	3.41%	▼3.22	13,375	Bavany Maduracayy	PMK	Lost
1996	11th	0 / 1	Steady	4.30%	▲0.89	19,792	Bavany Maduracayy	PMK	Lost
1998	12th	Did Not Contest to Support NDA candidate							
1999	13th	0 / 1	Steady	31.73%	▲27.43	1,40,920	M. Ramadass	NDA	Lost
2004	14th	1 / 1	▲1	49.95%	▲18.82	2,41,653	M. Ramadass	UPA	Government
2009	15th	0 / 1	▼1	34.32%	▼15.63	2,08,619	M. Ramadass	UNPA	Lost
2014	16th	0 / 1	Steady	3.07%	▼31.25	22,754	R.K.R. Anantharaman	NDA	Lost
2019	17th	Did Not Contest to Support NDA candidate							
2024	18th	Did Not Contest to Support NDA candidate							

== List of Elected Representatives ==
=== Member of Legislative Assembly (Tamil Nadu) ===
Year	Assembly	Constituency	MLA Name	Remarks				
Year	Assembly	Constituency	MLA Name	Remarks	1991	10th	Panruti	S. Ramachandaran
1996	11th	Pennagaram	G. K. Mani	1st Term				
1996	11th	Edapadi	I. Ganesan	1st Term				
1996	11th	Taramangalam	P. Govindan					
1996	11th	Andimadam	Rajendiran					
2001	12th	Acharapakkam (SC)	A. Selvaraj					
2001	12th	Kapilamalai	A. R. Malaiyappasamy					
2001	12th	Vridhachalam	R. Govindasamy					
2001	12th	Pennagaram	G. K. Mani	2nd Term				
2001	12th	Tiruttani	G. Raviraj					
2001	12th	Edapadi	I. Ganesan	2nd Term				
2001	12th	Andimadam	J. Gurunathan	1st Term				
2001	12th	Chengalpattu	K. Arumugam	1st Term				
2001	12th	Vandavasi (SC)	K. Murugavelrajan					
2001	12th	Dharmapuri	K. Pary Mohan					
2001	12th	Salem-II	M. Karthe					
2001	12th	Taramangalam	M. P. Kamaraj					
2001	12th	Sankarapuram	P. Kasampu					
2001	12th	Cheyyar	P. S. Ulagarakshagan					
2001	12th	Andhiyur (SC)	R. Krishnan					
2001	12th	Natrampalli	S. Natarajan					
2001	12th	Poonamallee	S. Shanmugam					
2001	12th	Panruti	T. Velmurugan					
2001	12th	Tiruppattur	T. K. Raja					
2001	12th	Dharapuram (SC)	V. Sivakami					
2006	13th	Omalur	A. Tamizharasu					
2006	13th	Tirupporur (SC)	D. Moorthy					
2006	13th	Peranamallur	G. Edirolimanian					
2006	13th	Mettur	G. K. Mani	3rd Term				
2006	13th	Chengalpattu	K. Arumugam	2nd Term				
2006	13th	Arcot	K. L. Elavazhagan					
2006	13th	Kapilamalai	K. Nedunchezhian					
2006	13th	Poompuhar	K. Periyasamy					
2006	13th	Bhavani	K. V. Ramanathan					
2006	13th	Dharmapuri	L. Velusamy					
2006	13th	Kancheepuram	P. Kamalambal					
2006	13th	Taramangalam	P. Kannan					
2006	13th	Melmalayanur	P. Senthamizhselvan					
2006	13th	Kaveripattinam	T. A. Meganathan					
2006	13th	Tiruppattur	T. K. Raja					
2006	13th	Panruti	T. Velmurugan	2nd Term				
2006	13th	Mugaiyur	V. A. T. Kaliyavarathan					
2006	13th	Edapadi	V. Kaveri					
2011	14th	Gingee	A. Ganeshkumar	1st Term				
2011	14th	Jayankondam	J. Gurunathan	2nd Term				
2011	14th	Anaikattu	M. Kalai Arasu					
2021	16th	Salem (West)	Arul Ramadas					
2021	16th	Mailam	C. Sivakumar	1st Term				
2021	16th	Pennagaram	G. K. Mani	4th Term				
2021	16th	Dharmapuri	S. P. Venkateshwaran					
2021	16th	Mettur	S. Sadhasivam					
2026	17th	Gingee	A. Ganeshkumar	2nd Term				
2026	17th	Vikravandi	C. Sivakumar	2nd Term				
2026	17th	Jayankondam	G. Vaithilingam					
2026	17th	Dharmapuri	Sowmiya Anbumani					

=== Lok Sabha Members ===
Year	Lok Sabha	Member	Constituency	Remarks				
Year	Lok Sabha	Member	Constituency	Remarks	1998	12th	Dalit Ezhilmalai	Chidambaram (SC)
K. Parymohan	Dharmapuri				1998	12th		
M. Durai	Vandavasi				1998	12th		
N.T. Shanmugam	Vellore				1998	12th		
1999	13th	A.K. Moorthy	Chengalpattu					
1999	13th	E. Ponnuswamy	Chidambaram (SC)					
1999	13th	P. D. Elangovan	Dharmapuri					
1999	13th	M. Durai	Vandavasi	Re-elected for 2nd term				
1999	13th	N. T. Shanmugam	Vellore	Re-elected for 2nd term				
2004	14th	R. Velu	Arakkonam					
2004	14th	A. K. Moorthy	Chengalpattu	Re-elected for 2nd term				
2004	14th	E. Ponnuswamy	Chidambaram (SC)	Re-elected for 2nd term				
2004	14th	R. Senthil	Dharmapuri					
2004	14th	K. Dhanaraju	Tindivanam					
2004	14th	M. Ramadass	Puducherry					
2014	16th	Anbumani Ramadoss	Dharmapuri					

=== Rajya Sabha Member ===
No.	Portrait	Name (Birth–Death)	Term in office			Constituency (House)
No.	Portrait	Name (Birth–Death)	Assumed office	Left office	Time in office	Constituency (House)
1		Anbumani Ramadoss (1968–)	30 April 2004	29 June 2010	6 years	Tamil Nadu (Rajya Sabha)
1		Anbumani Ramadoss (1968–)	25 July 2019	24 July 2025	6 years	Tamil Nadu (Rajya Sabha)
1		Anbumani Ramadoss (1968–)	3 April 2026	2 April 2031	6 years	Tamil Nadu (Rajya Sabha)

== See also ==
- List of political parties in India
