= Desiya Makkal Sakthi Katchi =

- Leader: M.L.Ravi

Desiya Makkal Sakthi Katchi is a political party in India founded by M.L.Ravi in 2014. It is the Tamil Nadu state Party.

In the 2011 Tamil Nadu Legislative Assembly election, Makkal Sakthi Katchi contested 35 constituencies in 18 districts. Some of the party's candidates were members of the anti-corruption non-government organisation 5th Pillar that gained attention by issuing zero rupee. The party was led by a steering committee of six people including Vijay Anand of 5th Pillar.
