= 1987 Vanniyar reservation agitation =

Week-long protest in Tamil Nadu, India

The 1987 Vanniyar reservation protest was a week-long protest organized by the Vanniyar Sangham headed by S. Ramadoss in Tamil Nadu in September 1987 demanding 20 percent reservation for Vanniyars in education and employment in the state and 2 percent in education and employment in the Union government. The agitation turned violent and destructive; the protestors damaged roadways and reportedly cut down lakhs of trees to block roadways, and destroyed public property. The activists of the Vanniyar Sangham attacked Dalit settlements and burned down more than 1,400 Dalit houses in numerous villages. At least 21 people were shot dead by the Tamil Nadu police sent to suppress the agitators.

The incident forced the DMK government led by M. Karunanidhi to create a Most backward class (MBC) quota for 108 castes, including Vanniyars, which granted them 20 per cent reservation in education and employment in 1989.

== Background and causes ==
The Vanniyars are Tamil Nadu's second-largest community, after the scheduled caste. They mostly work as agricultural labourers and are concentrated in the northern Tamil Nadu towns of Cuddalore, Vellore, Tiruvallur, Ranipet, Chengalpet, Villupuram and Kancheepuram where they make up a sizable vote bank. The Ambashankar Commission, established in 1982 to investigate the Vanniyar quota claim, assessed their population to be at 13%.

The Vanniyars had already campaigned for more reservations twice in the previous year. However, the MGR government ignored their plea.

=== Caste identity and Vanniyar sangham ===
Vanniyars have a lengthy history of strong caste assertion dating back over a century. They were formerly referred to as the "pallis," and opposed to being classified as a low caste as early as 1833 by attempting to get a decree in Pondicherry. The community requested the census authorities in 1871 to be classified as Kshatriya. Vanniyars attempted to establish their status and identity by fusing actual history with mythology and claimed to be the AgniKula (fire race), kshatriyas, and the Pallava dynasty's descendants. In 1888, the Chennai Vanniyakula Kshatriya MahaSangam was founded. Many Vanniyars began referring to themselves as vanniyakula kshatriya in an effort to enhance their identity and status.

The communities caste organizations began taking economic concerns in order to help the group move up the social ladder. The Vanniyars founded their own party, the Tamil Nadu Toilers Party during the 1952 general elections, which eventually separated to form the Common Weal Party. In 1980, S. Ramadoss was able to bring together 27 caste organisations to create the Vanniyar Sangham. From the inception, the Vanniyar Sangham lobbied for a greater share of education, jobs, and power.

The Dalits are seen by Vanniyars as potential competition for employment and other economic opportunities. The majority of individuals from both the Vanniyar and Dalit communities are poor laborer who compete for employment opportunities, which frequently resulted in clashes between them.

=== Reservations ===
S. Ramadoss claimed that among the 213 castes listed as backward in Tamil Nadu, just a few dominating castes have reaped the majority of the advantages of the 50% backward class reservation. According to the Tamilnadu Backward Class Commission's report, the representation of the backward and most backward classes in education is extremely low in comparison to their numbers. In 1970, merely 33.33 percent of the total number of pupils who took the SSLC test were from backward or most backward areas. Vanniyars, who made up around 12% of the population in 1970, accounted for 3.28 percent of students who took the SSLC in 1970 and 1.74 percent of students accepted to engineering institutions in July 1970. According to R Vidyasagar, when multiple castes are grouped together in the list of backward castes, existing social and economic imbalances amongst those backward class allow some influencing groups to take away a large share of the benefits, and the Vanniyar's demand for exclusive reservation proportionate to their population must be seen in this context. Minority castes, on the other hand, reject proportional reservation, claiming that it would severely limit their accessibility to reservation advantages, and instead seek rotational reservation.

== Protests ==
A week of protests was organised by the Vanniyar Sangham from September 17 to September 23, 1987 across the state to urge its demand for a separate 20% reservation quota for Vanniyars in state government jobs and educational institutions, as well as a 2% quota in the union government. The rasta roko (obstruction) agitation halted daily activities in the state's northern regions. Stones and trees were dumped over the roadways in Chengalpattu and South Arcot which served as effective roadblocks. Trenches were constructed across the highways in several areas. Vanniyar Sangam protesters reportedly blocked important highways by reportedly felling lakhs of trees, as well as telephone poles and lamp posts. They littered pieces of glass over roads and rolled huge rocks across them, creating holes in important roadways. Furthermore, the protestors blew up culverts with crude homemade explosives.

Thousands of cadres of the Dravida Munnetra Kazhagam (DMK) who were returning to their home after the inauguration of Anna Arivalayam (a temple of Knowledge dedicated to C.N. Annadurai) in Madras were stopped and the buses and lorries they travelled were set on fire after doused in kerosene by the agitators. There were also clashes between the two groups. The police eventually offered armed protection to large truck convoys. The DMK function which originally scheduled on September 15, was rescheduled for September 16 because the government did not want it to coincide with MGR's expected return from the United States. The agitation which was planned for 6 a.m on September 17 at was pushed it back six hours to midnight by pro-All India Anna Dravida Munnetra Kazhagam agitators with an intent to stir up unrest. The DMK workers on their way home from the inauguration were confronted by the rampaging agitators. Thousands of travellers were stuck by the side of the road, without enough food or drink. In neighbouring areas, Vanniyar Sangam activists assaulted people who had been requested by police to clear roadways, resulting in a police shooting that killed 11 protestors during the first day of the agitation.

State officials issued “shoot on sight” orders, allowing officers to open fire on anybody found destroying public property or assisting the roko. Fleets of public buses were escorted to their destination by armed police convoys. Following the late-night burning of a milk truck in Chennai's Ambattur, security precautions were expanded to vehicles carrying food grains and essential supplies. During the protest, limited road traffic combined with increased security threats resulted in acute shortages of basic commodities within Chennai. The traffic in the south of Madras came to a complete stop.

=== Violence against Dalits ===
Violence against Dalits began on the first day when members of the Dalit community joined policemen in cleaning up the debris left by the protests. The activists of the Vanniyar Sangam allegedly warned the Dalits not to obstruct their agitation. When some Dalits refused, numerous Dalit settlements were destroyed. The rioting began with the burning of 100 Dalit homes in Sundaripalayam. Clashes escalated between both the communities on many villages where local scores were settled.

Vanniyar Sangham activists targeted Dalit communities who had impeded their agitation by burning Dalit hamlets in the northern districts in the following days, including around 80 houses in Chitharasoor and Mazhavaranoor, more than 75 houses in Nellikuppam, and an uncertain number of houses in Kandarakottai. On September 21, 1987, about 1,000 Vanniyar Sangam activists set fire to Endathur hamlet near Uttiramenur. On September 23, 1987, Vanniyar Sangam agitators went to four villages in Alampakkam, near Cuddalore and burned approximately 1,200 Dalit homes which displaced an estimated 5,000 Dalit inhabitants.

== Detentions and casualties ==
During the unrest, the police took 20,461 people into custody, including about 2,500 people who were detained as a preventive measure. During the course of the week-long protests, police shooting killed an estimated 23 Vanniyars.

== Aftermath ==
Chief minister, MGR, was in a hospital for a check up in the United States at the time of the protests. After returning to India, he met with the community but was unable to reach an agreement. MGR died within a couple of days.

The incident forced the DMK government led by M. Karunanidhi to create a Most backward class (MBC) quota with 108 castes, including Vanniyars which granted them 20 per cent reservation in education and employment in 1989.

== Memorial Day ==
The Pattali Makkal Katchi marked September 17 as Veera Vanakka Naal every year to honour the members who died in the demonstrations.

== Bibliography ==
- Collins, Michael A (2017-01-01). "Recalling Democracy: Electoral Politics, Minority Representation, and Dalit Assertion in Modern India". Publicly Accessible Penn Dissertations: 1–298. Archived from the original on June 5, 2020 – via University of Pennsylvania. (Available online)
