= Alagaapuram R. Mohanraj =

Indian politician

Alagaapuram R. Mohan Raj is an Indian politician and was a member of the 14th Tamil Nadu Legislative Assembly from the Salem North constituency. He represented the Desiya Murpokku Dravidar Kazhagam party. He also served Deputy Leader of Opposition in Tamil Nadu assembly from 2014 till 16 and now serving as Propaganda Secretary of DMDK.

The elections of 2016 resulted in his constituency being won by R. Rajendran.
