= G. Venkatachalam =

Indian politician

Member of the Tamil Nadu Legislative Assembly
- Incumbent
- Assumed office 11 May 2026
- Preceded by: S. Sadhasivam
- Constituency: Mettur
- In office 16 May 2011 – 12 May 2021
- Preceded by: Constituency Established
- Succeeded by: Arul Ramadas
- Constituency: Salem West

Personal details
- Party: All India Anna Dravida Munnetra Kazhagam

Govindhan Venkatachalam (born 1969) is an Indian politician from Tamil Nadu. He is a three time member of the Tamil Nadu Legislative Assembly. He won twice from the Salem West constituency and once from Mettur in 2026, all representing the Anna Dravida Munnetra Kazhagam.

== Early life and education ==
Venkatachalam is from Salem, Tamil Nadu. He is the son of K. Govindhan. He did his schooling at Nillambal Subramaniyam High School, Suramangalam, Salem before dropping out of Class 9 in 1979. In 2026, he declared assets worth Rs.2 crore in his affidavit to the Election Commission of India.

== Career ==
Venkatachalam is a senior leader of AIADMK and he won as an MLA for the third time winning the 2026 Tamil Nadu Legislative Assembly election from Mettur Assembly constituency. He polled 86,498 and defeated his nearest rival, M. Midhun Chakravarthy of the Dravida Munnetra Kazhagam, by a margin of 19,105 votes. He became an MLA for the first time winning the 2011 Tamil Nadu Legislative Assembly election from Salem West constituency Rajendran. R. of DMK by 27,661 votes. He retained the seat for AIADMK in the 2016 Assembly election defeating Pannerselvam of DMK by 7,247 votes.
