= S. Ramadoss =

Tamil politician (born 1939)

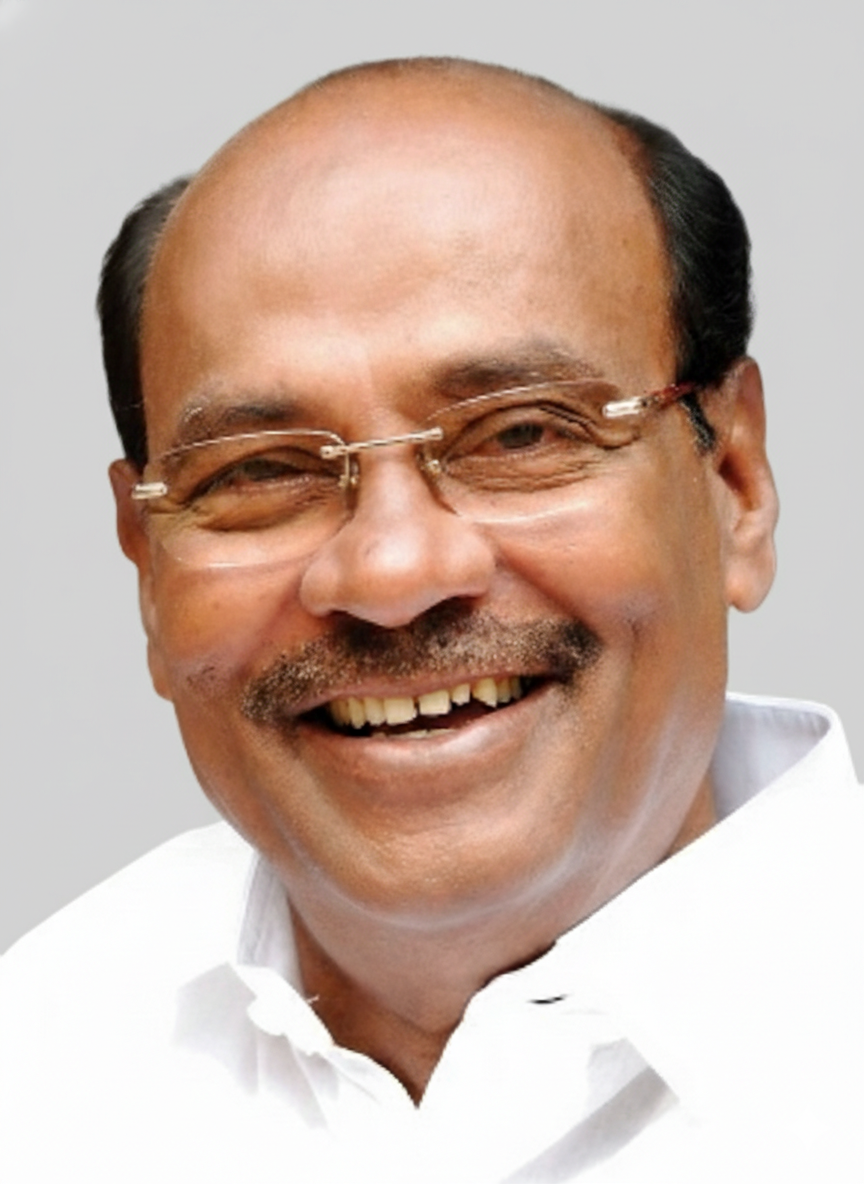
- Ramadoss's Portrait

Founder of Pattali Makkal Katchi

Personal details
- Born: 25 July 1939 (age 87) Kilsiviri Village, Villupuram, Madras Presidency, British India (now Tamil Nadu, India)
- Party: Pattali Makkal Katchi (1989-2025) (2026-present)
- Other political affiliations: Anaithindhiya Jananayaka Padhugappu Kazhagam (2025-2026)
- Spouse: Saraswathi (m. 1965)
- Children: 3, including Anbumani Ramadoss
- Education: Madras Medical College
- Occupation: Politician

Sanjeevi Rayar Ramadoss (born 25 July 1939) is an Indian politician from Tamil Nadu. He is the founder and president of the Pattali Makkal Katchi. In 2025, following a months long dispute with his son, Dr. Anbumani Ramadoss, he formed Anaithindhiya Jananayaka Padhugappu Kazhagam, a splinter faction of the original PMK party. The dispute ended with both of them getting reunited and thereby, disbanding the splinter faction.

== Early life ==
Ramadoss was born on 25 July 1939 in Kilsiviri (also spelled Keezhsiviri) village, Villupuram, Madras Presidency (now Tamil Nadu) to Sanjeevi Rayar Gounder and Navaneetham Ammal. They belonged to the Vanniyar community and were farmers.

== Vanniyar reservation protest ==
In 1987, the Vanniyar Sangham under Ramadoss organized the 1987 Vanniyar reservation agitation demanding MBC status for Vanniyars. At the peak of the protests, the state was paralysed for a week when lakhs of trees were cut down, highways blocked and damaged and more than 1400 houses of the Dalit community burned down. The police under the M G Ramchandran (MGR) led AIADMK government shot down 21 protestors. Later in 1989, the DMK government under M. Karunanidhi granted them 20 percent reservation under the Most backward class. The Pattali Makkal Katchi, founded by S. Ramadoss on 16 July 1989, emerged from these protests.

== Controversy ==
=== Threatening journalists ===
S. Ramadoss is known for using foul language in press meets and public meetings. In June 2019 he stoked a controversy, saying that he would kill journalists who question him about hundreds of trees cut down by his party workers during his arrest by the J Jayalalithaa government. He said, "if we protest again we will not cut trees but hack down those who ask these questions, and throw their mangled bodies across the road." He also called the journalists "dogs" and "Kammanati pasanga", a derogatory phrase used for 'son of widow'.

'
