= Nochimalai =

- panchayat town
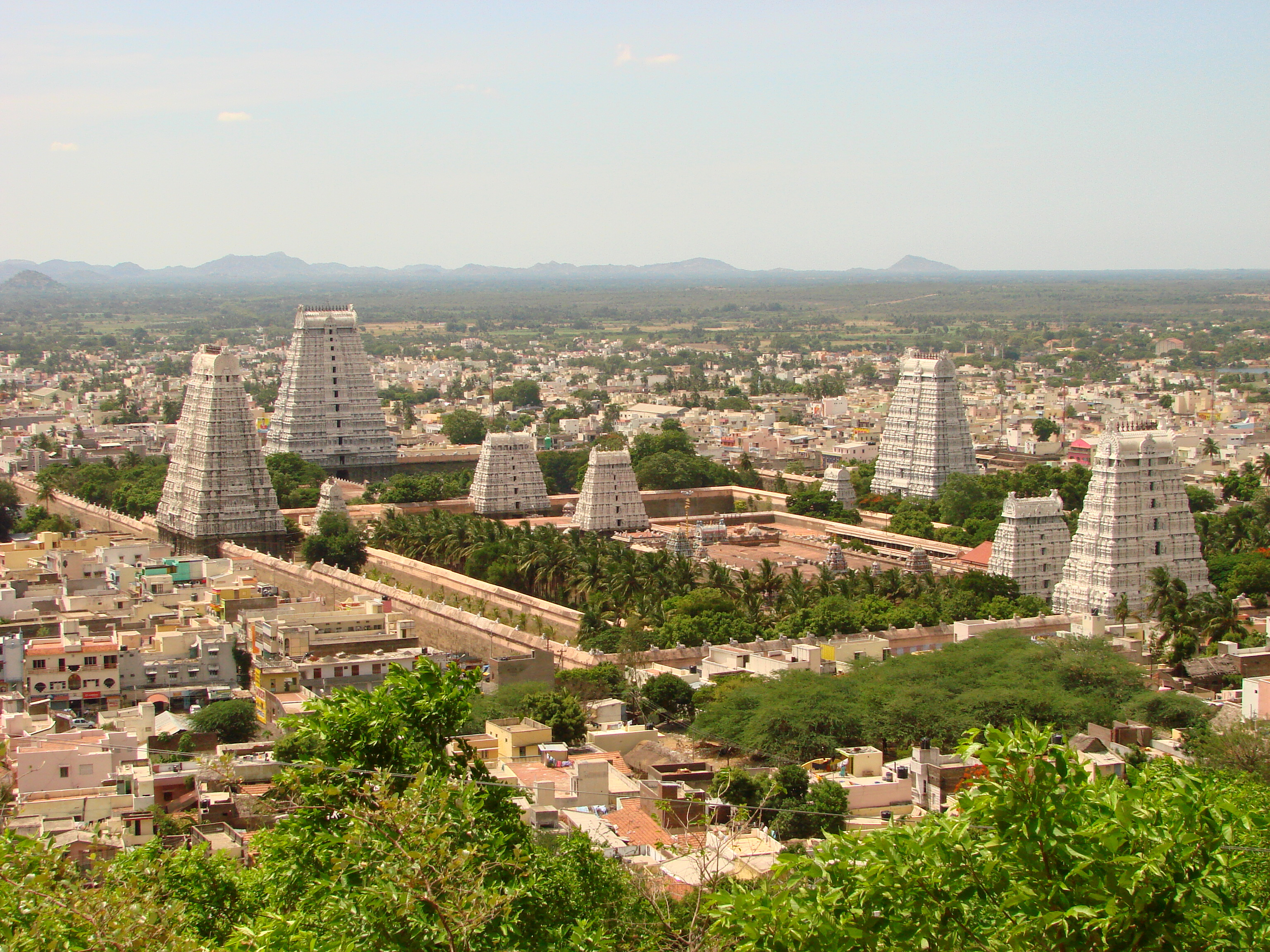

- Location in Tamil Nadu, India
- Coordinates: 12.22°N 79.11°E
- Country: India
- State: Tamil Nadu
- District: Tiruvannamalai

Government
  - Chairman: Rajavathi Kumaran (dmk)

Area
  - Total: 16.3 km^{2} (6.3 sq mi)
- Elevation: 171 m (561 ft)

Population (2012)
  - Total: 5,891
  - Density: 361/km^{2} (936/sq mi)

Languages
  - Official: Tamil
- Time zone: UTC+5:30 (IST)
- PIN: 606 610
- Telephone code: 91-4175
- Vehicle registration: TN 25
- Lok Sabha constituency: Thiruvannamlai
- Vidhan Sabha constituency: Thiruvannamalai city
- Climate: moderate (Köppen)
- Avg. summer temperature: 41 °C (106 °F)
- Avg. winter temperature: 18 °C (64 °F)

Nochimalai is a village in Tiruvannamalai taluk, Tiruvannamalai district, Tamil Nadu. Nochimalai is 6 km far from Tiruvannamalai and 157 km from Chennai.

Nochimalai is near: Thandrampet block (15.2 km), Thurinjapuram (18.1 km), Kalasapakkam(23.1 km), Kizh-pennathur (24.4 km) .

== Demographics ==
Nochimalai has a population of over 5,500. There is one railway station for Nochimalai at Tindivanam railway route.
