= Avur, India =

Aavur
- town
- Interactive map of Aavur
- Coordinates: 12°8′5″N 79°12′9″E
- Country: India
- State: Tamil Nadu
- Municipality: Avur
- Time zone: UTC+5 (IST)
- PIN: 606755
- Area code: 04175

Avur is a small town situated in Tiruvannamalai District, Tamil Nadu, India. Previously it was part of the North Arcot district. For administrative purposes it comes under the Kilpennathur Revenue Union. The town has existed since the Cheran and Pandian dynasties and was then ruled by the Arcot Nawabs.

Aavur shares the border with Vettavalam on the east, Karippur on the west, and Nadupattu on the north. It is situated on the Tamil Nadu state highway 135 which connects Villupuram and Tiruvannamalai. Two lakes, Periyeri (Larger Lake) and Chitteri (Smaller Lake), serve as the main sources of water. The nearest train station is Tiruvannamalai which is about 18 kilometres (11 mi) from the village center, the nearest airport is Chennai International Airport which is about 180 kilometres (110 mi) away.

The population is 65% Muslim and they are specialized manufacturers in mat weaving. The only source of income to the people here is especially from mat weaving. Since everybody is working in same field of mat weaving and there are more than 200 heavy duty machines are available. It is also similar to cottage industry. Two masjids (Mosques), two temples and 4 churches are here. Around four schools are working.

Total voters are 3,501 (male voters are 1,734 and female voters are 1,767).
