= Brahmadesam, Cheyyar =

Brahmadesam (Cheyyar) Brahmadesam
- Town Panchayat
- Location in Tamil Nadu, India Brahmadesam (Cheyyar) (India)
- Coordinates: 12°50′19″N 79°31′30″E
- Country: India
- State: Tamil Nadu
- District: Tiruvannamalai District

Population (2001)
  - Total: 5,288

Languages
  - Official: Tamil
- Time zone: UTC+5:30 (IST)
- PIN: 632511
- Telephone code: 04182
- Vehicle registration: TN97 Cheyyar division
- Nearest city/town: Arcot, Cheyyar, Kanchipuram
- Sex ratio: 100.5 ♂/♀
- Literacy: 69.77%%
- Lok Sabha constituency: Arani

Brahmadesam is an Indian Panchayat, town panchayat village located in Vembakkam Taluk of Tiruvannamalai district in the state of Tamil Nadu. It is one of the 64 village panchayats under Vembakkam block of the Thiruvannamalai district. Brahmadesam is located on Right Bank of Palar River. The village code for Brahmadesam is 07 and it falls under the Venbakkam Block (Block Code.13).

== Etymology ==
The word Brahmadesam (also spelled as Brammadesam) means "Country of Brahma" in Tamil. There are at least five other villages in Tamil Nadu, also named as "Brahmadesam" located in Tirunelveli, Villupuram, Perambalur and Erode districts respectively.

== Demographics ==
According to the 2001 census, the population of Brahmadesam was 5,288 with a total of 1,198 households. The female to male sex ratio was 995 with 2,638 males and 2,650 females. The literacy rate in the village was 69.77%.

== Amenities ==
=== Post office ===
Brahmadesam village has Branch post office which comes under Ranipet (Head Office). The village shares the postal code "632511" along with 5 branch offices of Tiruvanamalai district namely Vadailluppai, Thennampattu, Sattuvanthangal, Pulivalam- Sunaipattu, Natteri, & with 4 other Branch offices in Vellore District Sakkaramallur, Ananthangal, Esayanur, Jagirvalavanur respectively.

=== Police station ===
Brahmadesam has a police station in charge of a Sub-Inspector. The village along with nearby hamlet pudur come under the station's jurisdiction.

=== Bank ===
One of the major banks in India - Indian Overseas Bank - has a branch at Brahmadesam. It is located at Kosa Street.

== Education ==
To cater to the educational needs of rural students the Government of Tamil Nadu has set up one Adi Dravidar Welfare Elementary School (Especially for the Upliftment of Scheduled caste students in Tamil Nadu), two Panchayat Union Elementary Schools and a Government Higher Secondary School administered by the Department of School Education.

== Transport ==
Brahmadesam is situated on the State Highway (SH-05) and is connected to nearest towns Cheyyar, Arcot, Vandavasi, Tindivanam & Kanchipuram by Government operated & private buses. Also NH-48 For 5 km South in near Village Ocheri to this village.

== Landmarks ==
The memorial tomb of King Rajendra Chola I and Queen Viramadevi is located inside the Chandramouleeswar Temple in Brahmadesam. Stone inscriptions from the Ancient Chola dynasty can be found on the walls of the monument. Tamil Nadu State Archeological Department and Tiruvannamalai District Historical Research Centre jointly maintain the Site. The Monument has been declared a National Importance under "Ancient Monuments and Archaeological Sites and Remains Act 1958" by Archaeological Survey of India. Lord Prakadiswarar temple is the oldest temple here, built by Simhavarman of the Pallava dynasty in circa 6th century AD. It is now maintained by Tamil Nadu State Archaeology Department. The specialty of this temple is pillars that can produce seven different types of musical notes (or seven swaras or sapthaswara). The sanctum santorum of this temple is also one of a kind.

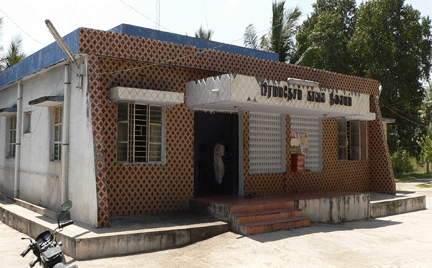
Police station of Brahmadesam Village Panchayat located in Cheyyar taluk of Tiruvannamalai district, Tamil Nadu

== Adjacent communities ==
- Kalavai
- Arani
- Cheyyar
- Kanchipuram
- Kaveripakkam
- Arcot
- Tindivanam
