= Kadaladi (Tiruvannamalai) =

Kadaladi Parvathamalai
- Village
- Nickname: Parvathamalai adivaram
- Location within Tamil Nadu Location within India
- Coordinates: 12.404°N 78.966°E
- Country: India
- State: Tamil Nadu
- District: Tiruvannamalai
- Taluk: Kalasapakkam
- Panchayat status: 1886

Government
  - Type: Grama Panchayat
  - Body: Village
  - Panjayat Thalaivar: Mr.Arumugam (AIDMK)

Area
  - Total: 13.64 km^{2} (5.27 sq mi)
- Elevation: 171 m (561 ft)

Population (2011)
  - Total: 10,093 (approximately)

Languages
  - Official: Tamil
- Time zone: UTC+5:30 (IST)
- PIN: 606908
- Telephone code: 91-4175
- Vehicle registration: TN 25
- Member of Legislative assembly: Mr.E.V.Velu (DMK)

Kadaladi is a small village in Kalasapakkam taluk, Tiruvannamalai district, Tamil Nadu, India. The nearby towns are Kalasapakkam, Pudupalayam, Thurinjapuram and Polur. It comes under Kadalady Panchayath. It is located 26 km north of the district capital.

The Kadaladi postal code is 606908.

== Demographics of Kadaladi ==
Kadaladi is a predominantly Tamil-speaking village.

== Politics in Kadaladi ==
Dravida Munnetra Kazhagam (DMK), AIADMK, Indian National Congress, and Pattali Makkal Katchi are the major political parties in the area. The area is currently represented by Mr. N. Arumugam of the AIADMK.

== Education ==
- Government Higher Secondary School
- Aided Elementary School (A N M)
- Kamaraj Nursery School
- Panchayat Union Elementary School
- Panchayat Union Elementary School, Mampakkam
- Panchayat Union Elementary School, Melkodi
- Adi Dravidar Welfare Middle School
- Jeganjothi Matric School
- Sri ragavendra nursery & primary school, kadaladi
