= Arani, Tamil Nadu =

Arani, Tamil Nadu may refer to several places:

- Arni, Tiruvannamalai, also written as Arani, a town in Tiruvannamalai district, Tamil Nadu
- Arani, Chennai, a suburb of Chennai, Tiruvallur district, Tamil Nadu
- Arani river, a river in India that flows through the states of Tamil Nadu and Andhra Pradesh
