= Cheyyar division =

Revenue division in Tamil Nadu, India

Cheyyar division is a revenue division is one of Three revenue circle in the Tiruvannamalai district of Tamil Nadu, India. It comprises the taluks of Vembakkam, Cheyyar, Vandavasi and Chetpet.
