= Veerambakkam =

Village in Tamil Nadu, India

Coordinates: 12°34′30″N 79°36′54″E

Veerambakkam is a village located in the Vandavasi Taluk of Tiruvannamalai District in the Indian state of Tamil Nadu. It is administratively part of the Cheyyar revenue division.

Veerambakkam spans a geographical area of about 559 hectares. The nearby Palar River influences the region's agricultural practices. It is connected by local roads to Vandavasi and State Highway 115 (SH-115). The village has a government-run primary school, a panchayat office, and several temples. The postal code for the area is 604408.
