= Porikkal =

- village
- Location in Tamil Nadu, India Porikkal (India)
- Coordinates: 12.05°N 79.16°E
- Country: India
- State: Tamil Nadu
- District: Tiruvanamalai
- Elevation: 168 m (551 ft)

Population (2011)
  - Total: 932

Languages
  - Official: Tamil
- Time zone: UTC+5:30 (IST)
- Postal code: 606804

Porikkal is a village in the Kadagaman Panchayat, Tiruvannamalai taluk, Tiruvannamalai district. It is in the Kilpennathur (state assembly constituency) and Tiruvannamalai (Lok Sabha constituency).
