= Aarani taluk =

Taluk of Thiruvannamalai district of the Indian state of Tamil Nadu

Coordinates: 12.668548°N 79.2842°E

Aarani taluk is a taluk of Thiruvannamalai district of the Indian state of Tamil Nadu. The headquarters is the town of Aarani.

== Demographics ==
According to the 2011 census, the taluk of Aarani had a population of 294,207 with 146,850 males and 147,357 females. There were 1,003 women for every 1,000 men. The taluk had a literacy rate of 71.68. Child population in the age group below 6 was 14,866 males and 14,186 females.

== See also ==
Aarani Municipality

== Etymology ==
Hypothesis #1 In olden days Aarani was called Aaranyam. Aar means Athi tree; such trees once covered the region. In the north of Aarani, there was a river, the Kamandala Naga river. These trees and river looked like an ornament; hence the name Aarani.

Hypothesis #2 The river Kamandala Naga Nathi flows in one side and the Tatchur river flows in other side as ornament (In Tamil literature ornament means "Ani") so Aaru(River) is making Ani(Ornament) hence the name Aarani.

Hypothesis #3 In Sanskrit Aranyam means 'Forest'. Hence, Derived from Aranyam.

== History ==
Aarani was ruled by the Cholas after they defeated the Pallavas. Some of the important Chola kings who ruled out Aarani are Kulothunga Cholan I, Vikrama Cholan, and Kulothunga Cholan II.

During the rule of the Vijayanagara Kingdom in Aarani, the Dasara function was celebrated grandly. In 1640 jagir of Aarani was granted to Vedaji Bhaskar Pant a Marathi brahmin. The jagir continued to be headed by the descendants of Bhaskar Pant till the Zamindari Abolition Bill was passed in 1948.

Poosi Malai Kuppam is 12 kilometres (7 mi) away from Aarani. Thirumalai Saheb built a sophisticated bungalow for his lover, an Anglo-Indian lady, there. During the Nawab period, there was a struggle between the British, French and Nawab Hyder Ali. The victorious British captured Aarani. There is also a palace near the town, now used by the Agriculture Department.

The town was used by Arcot nawabs for their military training campus. The famous 18th-century Marathi poet, author of the very beautiful poem "Nal-Damayanti Swayamvarakhyana" (the story of swayamvara of Nal & Damayanti) Raghunath Pandit is believed to have lived here.

The tomb situated in the heart of city for Sir. Ensign Robert Kelly who was a surveying Aarani area, a colonel by then, died in September 1790.

== Aarani and the Congress Movement ==
The Congress movement in Aarani was started by M. V. Subramania Sasthriar, S.A. Allala sundaram Mudaliyar, Y. N. Govindaraju Chettiar, Dr V Hariharan and others. Mahatma Gandhi visited Aarani twice, once in 1932 and the second time in 1934. During his second visit he was accompanied by Dr Rajendra Prasad. Gandhiji's visits aimed at boosting Harijan upliftment and the movement for the boycott of Simon Commission, Gandhiji visited Dr V Hariharan, an eminent physician and freedom fighter of Aarani at his residence and held extensive consultations with him, as the latter was already actively involved in the upliftment of the impoverished weaver community of Aarani.

== Fort ==
There is a fort in the heart of the town which is surrounded by agazhi called in Tamil. Fort area houses forest department, sub jail, registration office, police station, women police station, agricultural office, there is a parade ground within the fort area. Parade ground has a monument at the center in the memory of late Col. Robert Kelly. Govt. Boys High School, Govt. Girls High School and Subramaniya Sastri High School are located within the fort area. Kailayanathar temple and Vembuli amman temple are very famous

== Industry and commerce ==
Aarani is well known for its rice paddies; Aarani has the highest number of rice mills in the north district of Tamil Nadu; there are around 278 modern rice mills in the town. The town supplies rice to various towns in Tamil Nadu, various states and even various countries.

Silk weaving in Aarani, Thiruvannamalai district, Tamil Nadu The town also has a large community of silk weavers, called MUDALIYARS and Pattū nool karar, who specialize in making silk sarees. Hand looms are most frequently used for the weaving, although recently some have turned to mechanized methods such as Power looms. Aarani is the number one in revenue earning in Tiruvannamalai District, Tamil Nadu. Though the town is not well known outside Tamil Nadu, a bulk of India's silk apparels is produced by the people of Aarani. The Aarani gold is also very valuable in gold market.

== Events ==
The Vembuli Amman (வேம்புலி அம்மன்) Festival is a grand carnival in the town of Aarani. It takes place once in a year in the month of August. Nearly one lakh people gather at the temple on this festive occasion. Shri Puthra Kamateeswara Thirukoil witnesses a massive crowd during Kaanum Pongal (காணும் பொங்கல்) The Sri LakshmiNarasingaperumal Festival is grand carnival in the town of Nadaga salaipettai st, Saidai, AARANI The Sundhara Vinayagar Thirukovil resides, Arnipalayam in Aarani. For every Ganesh Chadhurthi, the village peoples will organized a three days grand function including Annadhanam, orchestra etc... The people who migrate from this place will come with their friends and relatives and gather at this places for this auspicious function. The Muthu Mariyamman thirukovil which is newly reconstructed on 2010 in Velappadi.. There is a grand festival is celebrated in velappadi village on every April month. More than thousands of peoples will gather on that day. All the families will engage with their friends, relatives and will have more enjoyment on this special occasion. The Venkatesan Patti (around 10 km from Aarani) is famous for the Baba, Hanuman and Mariamman temple. Every Thursday people gather here for Baba Arthi. The Hanuman Temple and Baba Temple was constructed by R. Subramanian Advocate in the year 2010 and 2011 respectively. The Baba here resembles Shiridi Baba. The children from the nearby schools too will participate in the Arthi. After demise of R. Subramanian, a memorial was established in Venkatesan Patti as a dedication to him by his families and friends. The famous Mysore Maharaja Maligai(Jagiri Maligai) at S.V. Nagaram is located 5 km from the Aarani Town. The famous Valapandal Pachaiamman Koil Temple which is 10 km from the Aarani Town and 8 km from the Paiyyur tank and Ramakrishna pettai (The Eastern part of Aarani). The famous Muthu Mariyamman thirukovil (around 12 km) at Kasthambadi Village. Every year seven days festival on every Tuesdays in a grand manner from July to August (i.e. in Tamil month Aadi). The famous padaivedumariyamman koil in is also near to aarani

== Politics ==
Aarani is one of the 234 MLA constituency in Tamil Nadu, Aarani is a Lok Sabha (Parliament of India) constituency in Tamil Nadu. It was created during the 2008 assembly delimitation from the former Vandavasi constituency Aarani (Lok Sabha constituency). Aarani assembly constituency was once a part of the Vellore (Lok Sabha constituency).

== Tourism ==
Arahanthgiri Jain Math[edit] Main article: Arahanthgiri Jain Math Arahanthgiri Jain Math is a Jain Math that was established at the ancient Jain site of Tiruvannaamalai in August, 1998.[5] The complex includes 3 Jain caves, 4 Jain temples and a 16 meter high sculpture of Neminatha thought to date from the 12th century that is the tallest Jain image in Tamil Nadu.

== Education ==
Anna University College of Engineering Aarani[edit] Main article: Anna University § Anna University - Constituent & University Colleges Anna University has its University College of Engineering Aarani in Aarani, S.S.Hr.Sec.School Aarani has completed 100 years, Aim Matric HR. Sec School in Agaram, Aarani
