= Thanipadi =

- Panchayat Town
- Location in Tamil Nadu, India
- Coordinates: 12.00°N 78.80°E
- Country: India
- State: Tamil Nadu
- District: Tiruvannamalai

Government
  - chairman: TR.Kamban (DMK)

Area
  - Total: 1.0 km^{2} (0.39 sq mi)
- Elevation: 102 m (335 ft)

Population (2011)
  - Total: 10,294
  - Density: 9,890/km^{2} (25,600/sq mi)

Languages
  - Official: Tamil
- Time zone: UTC+5:30 (IST)
- Telephone code: 91-4188
- Lok Sabha constituency: thiruvannamlai
- Vidhan Sabha constituency: Thandrampet
- Climate: moderate (Köppen)
- Avg. summer temperature: 37 °C (99 °F)
- Avg. winter temperature: 26 °C (79 °F)

Thanipadi is a panchayat town in Thandarampattu Taluk, Tiruvanamalai district, Tamil Nadu India. It is the largest and oldest town in the taluk. It was rewarded 3rd grade town panchayat in 1967 (at that time it was in Chengam taluk) and in 2001 it is rewarded 2nd grade town panchayat. In 2006, it was joined in Thandarampet Taluk carved out from Chengam and Thiruvannamalai taluks. Its zip code (or) Pin code is 606708.
