= Kallayee Gram Panchayat =

Village in Tamil Nadu, India

Kallayee Kalla yee
- Village Panchayat
- Location in Tamil Nadu, India Kallayee (India)
- Coordinates: 12.235440°N 79.07832°E
- Country: India
- State: Tamil Nadu
- District: Tiruvannamalai

Population (2011)
  - Total: 2,337

Languages
  - Official: Tamil
- Time zone: UTC+5:30 (IST)

Kallayee Village Panchayat (Kallayee Gram Panchayat), It is located in Kilipennathur locality in Tiruvannamalai district of Tamil Nadu. This panchayat falls under Kilibennathur Assembly Constituency and Thiruvannamalai Lok Sabha Constituency. This panchayat has a total of 7 panchayat constituencies. 7 Panchayat Council members are elected from these. As per 2011 India census, the total population is 2337. Among them 1194 females and 1143 males.

== Basic facilities ==
The following information has been compiled as per the 2015 data of the Tamil Nadu Rural Development and Panchayat Department.

| Basic Facilities | no. |
|---|---|
| Water Connections | 100 |
| Bore Pump | 12 |
| hand Pump | 12 |
| upper level water tanks | 2 |
| Ground level water tanks | |
| Municipal buildings | 7 |
| Municipal school buildings | 4 |
| Ponds or wells | 2 |
| Play Ground | 1 |
| Market | |
| Panchayat Union Roads | 56 |
| Panchayat roads | 1 |
| Bus stand | |
| Grayeyard | 2 |

== Villages ==
List of villages located in this panchayat:

1. Chorathur Colony
2. Chorathur
3. Kallayee
