= Konaiyur =

Konaiyur Koonoor
- Village
- Konaiyur Village main street with the Bajanai Koil and Panchayat Building

- Location in Tamil Nadu, India Konaiyur (India)
- Coordinates: 12.34°N 79.20°E
- Country: India
- State: Tamil Nadu
- District: Thiruvanamalai
- Elevation: 216 m (709 ft)

Languages
  - Official: Tamil
- Time zone: UTC+5:30 (IST)
- PIN: 632 316
- Telephone code: 91-(0)4182
- Vehicle registration: TN 25

Konaiyur is a tiny village in Tamil Nadu located at Tiruvannamalai District, Chetpet Taluck in India. Located at three kilometers from the state highway SH-4 from Vinnamangalam (via Nadupattu nad Kudisaikarai), in between Arni and Chetput. The neighboring villages are Periya Kozhappalur, Kudisaikarai, Vinayakapuram, Melanur, Thirumani, Katteri (Gengapuram), and Nariyambadi. Most of the villagers are rice farmers and fewer government employees. The village is located on the Cheyyar River bank, which originates from Jawadhu hills near Chengam and later joins in Palar River at Walajabath.

Due to limited ground water availability, farmers are changing their cultivation method to "deep borewell" instead of traditional wells. Lake irrigation system is almost stopped these days. The existing two lakes' total area is shrinking day by day and government is yet to take any action even after giving many complaints. Recent monsoon rain made the farmers to cheer but again the ground water level has gone below the average level. Agricultural activities are going down again. There were many hand-loom silk weavers, weaving silk sarees for Arni, Kancheepuram Silk, but these days no one is weaving due to less remuneration and health issues.

Classes conducted to the children at Konaiyur Panchayat Union School.

Village total population is around 1,800. The literacy level is not much satisfactory. But in recent days, all the young boys and girls are performing well in school education. The quality of teachers are much encouraging these days and the village students outperforming compared to the metro students. Konaiyur has only one school with 42 children, studying at Panchayat Union Elementary School, Konaiyur. Classes are conducted here from First to Fifth Standard. Most of the time the school will be operated with only one Head Master & one teacher for all the classes, he/she would be performing multiple task for the children. After completing the elementary school students has to commute to Periya Kolappalur (பெரிய கொழப்பலூர்) Government Higher Secondary School (now the school has been divided as Government Boys Higher Secondary School & Girls High school) to continue their studies up to higher secondary level. Nowadays many private schools operating the VAN facility for the school kids. Such facilities attracts the parents to send their kids to the private schools instead of Government schools. Which in turn make the education costlier but it should be a birth right and free for all the children.

In 2002, the full-fledged telephone connection from the Tamil Nadu government had been installed. For some reason the PSTN lines are discontinued. No copper telephone cable connectivity is present to this village. Nowadays the village is connected to the world arena with the major mobile operators. From year 2004 this village is receiving good quality of television cable connectivity from the nearby town Arni.

Due to the advancement of wireless technologies, villagers are able to use the Internet through their mobile connectivity. People are able to use download speeds of about 12 Mbps with their 4G mobile phones outdoors; indoors it is less. Wired broadband internet connectivity is not widely available. HD DTH television technology provides international television channels.

Emergency medical facilities are not available for the villagers so they need to travel to Periya Kolappalur Govt Hospital that are 4 km (2.5 mi) away. New 108 Emergency ambulance service is also helpful for the villagers.

Konaiyur Lakshmi Naryana Perumal Temple more than 250 years old. This temple was demolished and a new temple has been built.

Konaiyur Lakshmi Narayana Perumal Temple, built on the same place above

People belongs almost 95% are Hindus, remaining Christians and few Muslims. Majority of the population are belongs to Vanniyar, about 20% people are Yadhavar and about 10% of the people belongs to Scheduled Caste. In AD 1900s much varied different caste people were lived here but on now they have been relocated to the metro cities. Many small temples are constructed and renovated in different centuries. The figure which has shown here is the Lakshmi Narayana Perumal Temple constructed in the mid 17th century. Most people celebrated Pongal, Diwali, Ganesh Chaturthi, and Koozvaarthal as major festivals. Pongal, in the month of January and Koozvaarthal in the month of April/May are celebrated in a grandiose manner. Tamil Nadu’s famous Jallikattu used to be played during Pongal festival which adds real color and flavor to the festival. Due to lack of enthusiasm and unavailability of youngsters, passionate game of Jallikattu has been dropped in the recent times.

Konaiyur Village, the most happening Mattu Pongal festival in the village

Earlier, Konaiyur was coming under Vandavasi Lok Sabha constituency. But after the delimitation by the Election Commission of India, now the village is coming under Arani Lok Sabha constituency. Now the village is coming under Chetpet Taluk, previously it was under Vandavasi taluck. The majority of the population belongs to Vanniyar, most of them supporting the state political party Pattali Makkal Katchi (PMK) and its alliance.

Newly elected panchayat president of Konaiyur village is Mrs. Parameswari Natrajan for five-year term (2020-2025).

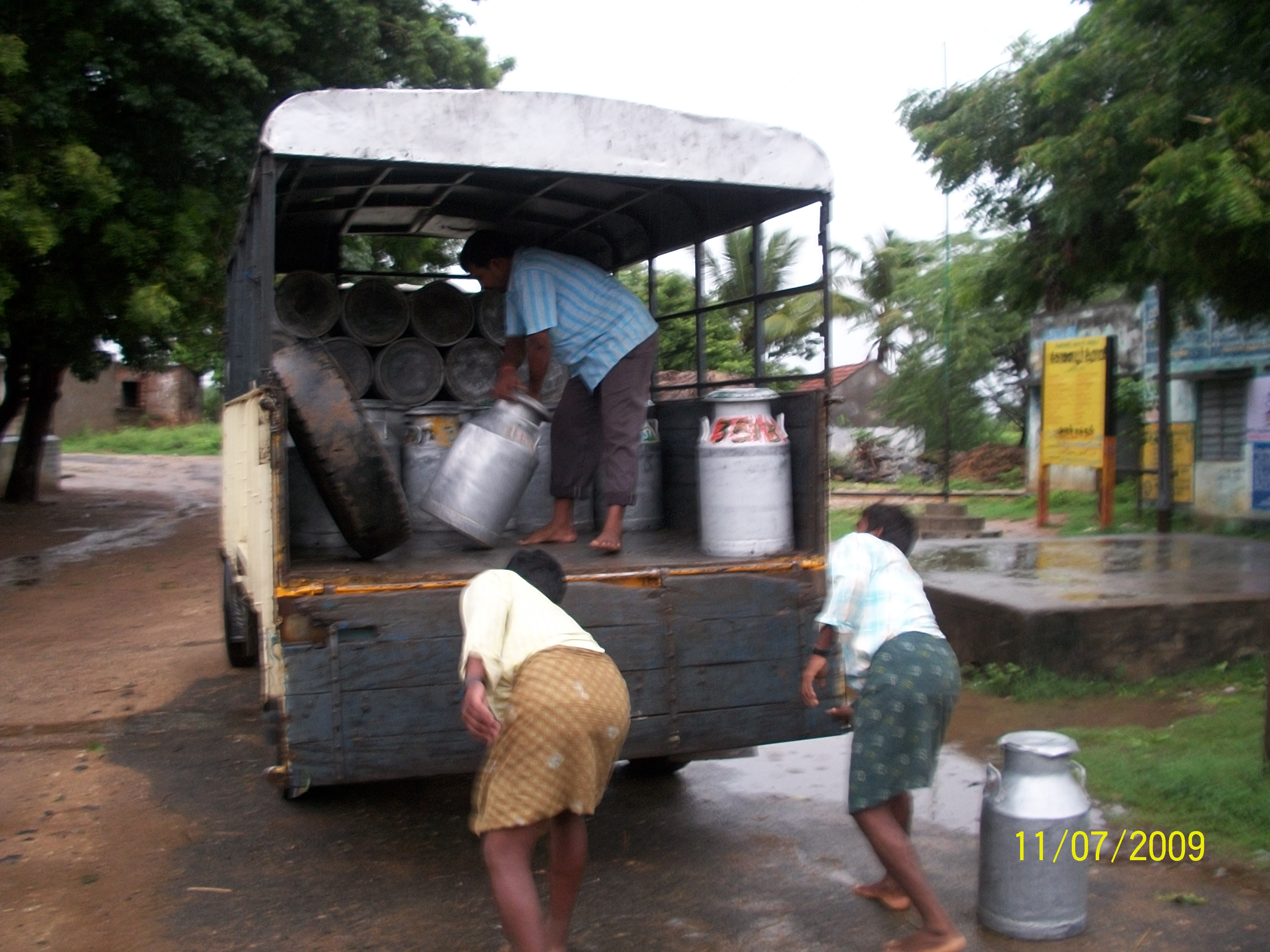
Collected milk has been loaded in to the van.

On an average daily 250 to 300 liters of good quality A1 & A2 milk is supplied to the private / government dairies. There are four different teams are collecting the milk from the farmers with stringent competition. The cow owners will get the weekly payment for the supplied milk. Actually cow owners are paid Rs.19 (for raw milk), in turn after transporting and processing it in to the cities the packet milk is sold Rs.40 to 50 per liter (after fat removal!!!). Surprisingly, a single liter of bottled water costs Rs.20 or 25 in metros / small towns / villages. Bottled water is having better commercial value (approved by the Government) than the farmers who produce good-quality cow milk.
