= Kurumbhur =

Kurumbhur (Kurambur or Kurumbur)
- Village
- Location in Tamil Nadu, India Kurumbhur (India)
- Coordinates: 12.581539°N 79.620445°E
- Country: India
- State: Tamil Nadu
- District: Tiruvanamalai
- Talukas: Cheyyar
- Elevation: 88 m (289 ft)

Languages
  - Official: Tamil
- Time zone: UTC+5:30 (IST)
- PIN: 604408
- Vehicle registration: TN 25
- Lok Sabha constituency: Cheyyar
- Vidhan Sabha constituency: Cheyyar

Kurumbhur, also called Kurambur or Kurumbur, is a village in Cheyyar taluk, Tiruvannamalai district, Tamil Nadu, India.

It is one of 219 villages in Cheyyar Block.

== Geography ==
Kurumbhur is located at 12.58°N 79.62°E. It has an average elevation of 88 m (289 ft) above mean sea level.
