= Kalambur =

Kalambur Aliyabad Suburban of Arani city
- Town panchayat
- Nickname: Rice mill town
- Location in Tamil Nadu, India
- Coordinates: 12°38′17″N 79°13′07″E
- Country: India
- State: Tamil Nadu
- District: Tiruvanamalai

Government
  - Body: Selection grade town panchayat

Population (2011)
  - Total: 31,751

Languages
  - Official: Tamil
- Time zone: UTC+5:30 (IST)
- Postal code: 606903
- Telephone code: 04181
- Vehicle registration: TN 97 (Arani)

Kalambur (formerly Aliyabad) is a selection grade town panchayat in Polur taluk, Tiruvanamalai district in the Indian state of Tamil Nadu, famous for its rice production. As of the 2011 census, the town had a population of 31,751. K.T.R.Palani is a Chairman of Kalambur selection grade Town panchyat.

== Etymology ==
Kalambur was once a battlefield known as "Por Kalam". Por Kalam has become "Kalam Por" on years, which was later called as "Kalambur". Old name for the town is 'Aliyabad'.

== Demographics ==
As of 2001 India census, Kalambur had a population of 13,291. Males constituted 49.6% of the population and females 50.4%. Kalambur had an average literacy rate of 75%, higher than the national average of 59.5%: male literacy was 79%, and female literacy was 57%. In 2001 in Kalambur, 11% of the population was under 6 years of age.

== Economy ==
Kalambur is noted for rice production. The town has several rice mills. around 70 rice mills. The rice from Kalambur is supplied to other parts of Tamil Nadu and the Tamil Nadu Civil Supplies. It is also exported to Singapore and Malaysia directly.

Based on the purification methods deployed here, Kalambur rices are having high quality.

The town is also locally famous for its silk sarees.

=== Agriculture ===
The majority of the population is engaged in agriculture. The town has three lakes which serve water to town and surrounding villages.

1. Periyeri 2. Chitheri 3. Soanthangal Lake

Periyeri and Chitheri both lakes interconnected and third Soanthangal lake connected through a PWD canal. All these lakes are serving water to eight small ponds in and around this city. Many ponds are aggressively encroached and occupied by local residents. Some of them vanished over years.

== Pollution ==
Due to the number of rice mills in and around the town, the air is polluted. Rice mills emit polluted air containing carbon dioxide and other compounds of green house gas directly into the air. The air here turns to black every morning due to polluted air. People in the town are expecting some pollution filter methods to be used in the rice mills.

== Transport ==
The town is well connected with roads and rails. District highways connecting Arani and Tiruvannamalai from the town. Another major road in the town is Santhavasal road which connects Vellore city and Padavedu. TNSTC buses ply to Chennai, Tiruvannamalai, Kancheepuram, Salem and other towns. Town buses ply between Arni and Polur.

In this town, Railway Station is located in the name of "Arni Road" Station Code: ARV. Arni city is easily accessible through this station. previously it was meter gauge now it was changed to broad gauge. Nowadays in Kalambur the people are well educated and employed in other states also so these people can easily travel through these rail facilities to Mumbai, Tirupathi, Puducherry, Bengaluru, Hubli, Dharwad, Goa, Rathnagiri, Pavel, Coimbatore, Tirupati, Renigunta, Hyderabad, Chennai, Villupuram, Vellore, Villupuram, Bhuvaneshwar, Kharagpur, Purulia, Mannargudi, Cuddalore and many other cities

== Health ==
Kalambur has a Govt. Upgraded Health Centre and the Govt. hospital providing 24hrs service and nearby there a Veterinary Hospital. There are many private clinics around the town.

== Festival ==
Almost entire peoples of this town celebrate Pongal (festival), and Chithirai Mudhal Naal or Lakcha deepa Thiruvizha. On this occasion, people pray to Veera Anjaneyar (Jai Hanuman). This is the great festival celebrated every year. People also celebrate festive occasion of Arulmigu Sri Drowpathi Amman Temple. On the occasion of Bogi Pongal people from the town will do pongal at Temple site and pray to Maari Amman.

== Christmas Festival ==
Famous church located at Thiruvalluvar street, Named "GATEWAY OF PRAISE CHURCH",.. where the celebration of Christmas, New Year & Good Friday eves taken place with Holistic healing. Ward members & Town leaders participate along with public with grand celebration in each year.
