= Poosimalaikuppam Gram Panchayat =

Village in Tamil Nadu, India

Poosimalaikuppam Poosi malai kuppam
- Village Panchayat
- Location in Tamil Nadu, India Poosimalaikuppam (India)
- Coordinates: 12.235440°N 79.078320°E
- Country: India
- State: Tamil Nadu
- District: Tiruvannamalai

Population (2011)
  - Total: 2,274

Languages
  - Official: Tamil
- Time zone: UTC+5:30 (IST)

Poosimalaikuppam Village Panchayat (Poosimalaikuppam Gram Panchayat), is a panchayat located in Arani district in Tiruvannamalai district of Tamil Nadu. The panchayat falls under Arani Assembly Constituency and Arani Lok Sabha Constituency. The panchayat has a total of 7 panchayat constituencies. 7 Panchayat Council members are elected from these. According to the 2011 India census, the population of the panchayat was 2274 people; among them were 1182 females and 1092 males.

== Basic facilities ==
The following information has been compiled according to the data of the Tamil Nadu Rural Development and Panchayat Department.

Basic facilities	Total No.
Water Connection	215
Bore Motor Pump	9
Hand Pump	10
Upper level reservoir tanks	6
Ground level reservoir tank	
Local government buildings	16
Government school buildings	6
Ponds or Wells	5
Play Ground	1
Market	
Panchayat Union Roads	53
Panchayat Roads	
Bus Stand	
Graveyard or Incinerations	7

== Villages ==
List of villages located in this panchayat:

1. Athiyoor
2. South Kota
3. Poochimalai kuppam
4. Moolathangal
5. West Kota
6. Arunthathiyar Colony
7. Adi Dravidar Colony
