= Vedal, Tiruvannamalai =

Vedal
- Village
- Location in Tamil Nadu, India Vedal (India)
- Coordinates: 12°22′34″N 79°28′27″E
- Country: India
- State: Tamil Nadu
- District: Tiruvannamalai

Population (2011)
  - Total: 2,092

Languages
  - Official: Tamil
- Time zone: UTC+5:30 (IST)

Vedal is a village in the Vandavasi taluk of Tiruvannamalai district of Tamil Nadu, India. In 2011, it had a population of 2,092.

== History ==
A monastery for Jain nuns existed in Vedal at least as early as 885 CE. At that time, the monastery housed around 500 nuns and another 400 lay Jaina. Written record of the institution comes from a stone inscription in Vedal, which describes a conflict between two groups in the monastery, having taken place during the reign of Aditya I.

== Demographics ==
Population as of the 2011 census
Category	Population
Male	1,036
Female	1,056
Total	2,092
