= Gandhinagar, Tiruvannamalai =

Gandhinagar Gandhinagar-Lakshmipuram
- town
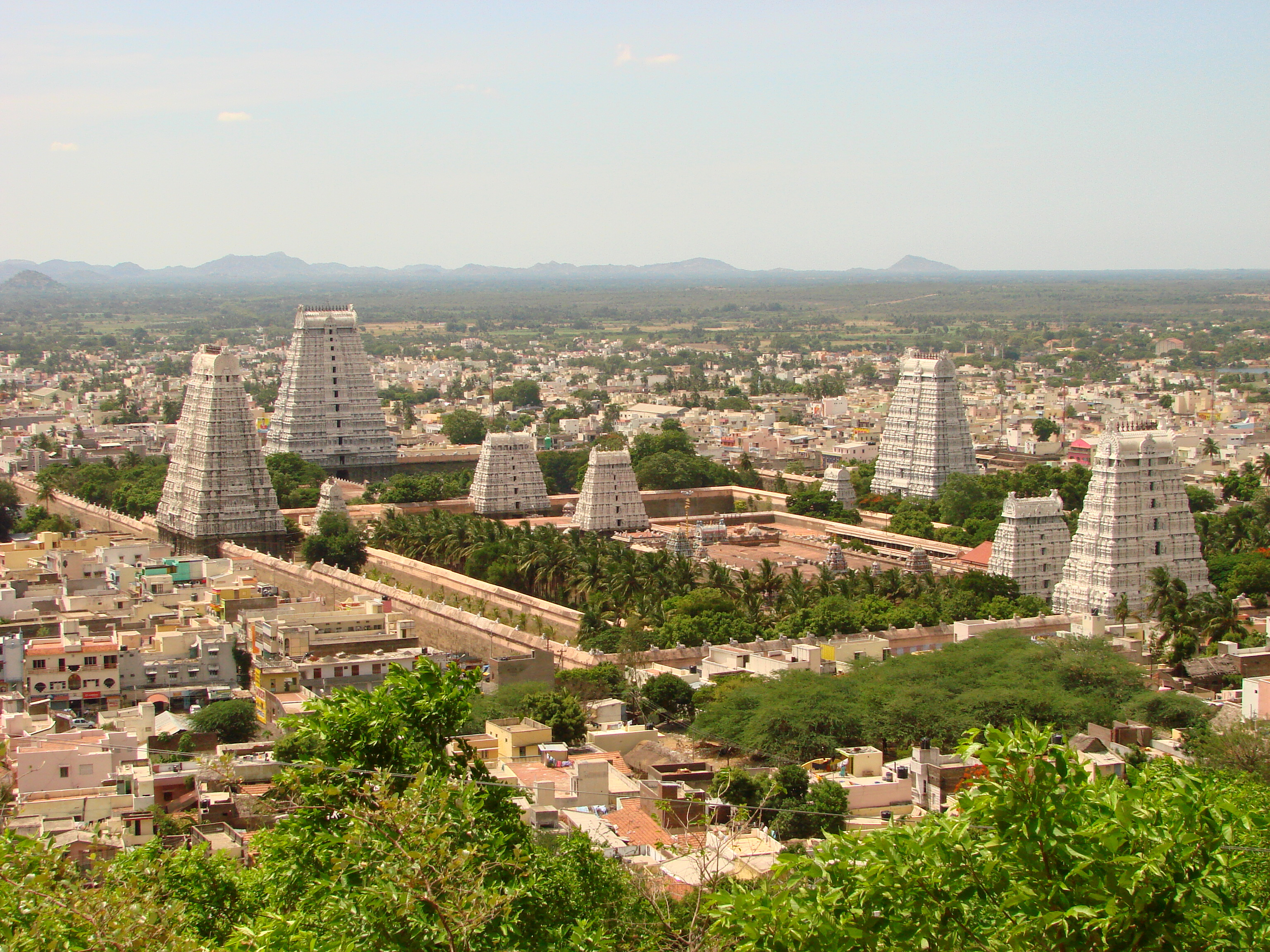
- Annamalaiyar temple at Thiruvannamalai

- Location in Tamil Nadu, India
- Coordinates: 12.22°N 79.11°E
- Country: India
- State: Tamil Nadu
- District: Tiruvannamalai
- Elevation: 169 m (554 ft)

Population (2012)
  - Total: 48,923

Languages
  - Official: Tamil
- Time zone: UTC+5:30 (IST)
- PIN: 606 602{fully} ,606 610 & 606 603 {partly}.
- Telephone code: 91(04175)-
- Vehicle registration: TN-25
- Rainfall: 76
- Avg. summer temperature: 41 °C (106 °F)
- Avg. winter temperature: 18 °C (64 °F)
- Website: www.injimedu.in

Gandhinagar-Lakshmipuram is 3rd grade municipality in thiruvannamalai UA, constructed in the year 2002 from the former gandhinagar special grade town panchayat and laskmipuram area carved out from the thyagi annamalai nagar town panchayat of thiruvannamalai UA. Many new peoples considers Gandhinagar is the part of thiruvannamalai city but it only serves as a part of Thiruvannamalai UA.It spreads out on the Tindivanam and Pondicherry(via:villupuram & vettavalam)roads of thiruvannamalai UA.

== Demographics ==
In 2001 Gandhinagar has population of 30 thousand and in 2002, after the joining of Lakshmipuram (which had a population of 11,000) it had a total population of 41,000. Gandhinagar had a population of over 36 thousand and lakhmipurm have more than 15,000 people totally this town having population of over 51,000 providing sub urban to Tiruvannamalai urbanity. it comes under Tiruvannamalai urban agglomerations on Pondicherry Road NH 66 and Villupuram Road NH 234. There are two railway stations for Gandhinagar: one is "Gandinagar-Lakshmipuram" and another is Old Gandinagar at Villupuram - Pondicherry railway route.

Linguistic census
| Linguistic groups | Percent(%) |
| Tamil | 70.57% |
| Kannada | 5.07% |
| Urdu | 4.79% |
| Telugu | 15.01% |
| Tulu | 2.01% |
| Malayalam | 0.53% |
| Other | 2.01% |

Historical population
| Year | Pop. | ±% |
|---|---|---|
| 1901 | ~100 | — |
| 1981 | 2,450 | — |
| 1991 | 21,057 | +759.5% |
| 2001 | 41,430 | +96.8% |
| 2011 | 63,327 | +52.9% |
Sources: 1951 – 2001
