= Sathanur Dam =

Dam in Tamil Nadu, India

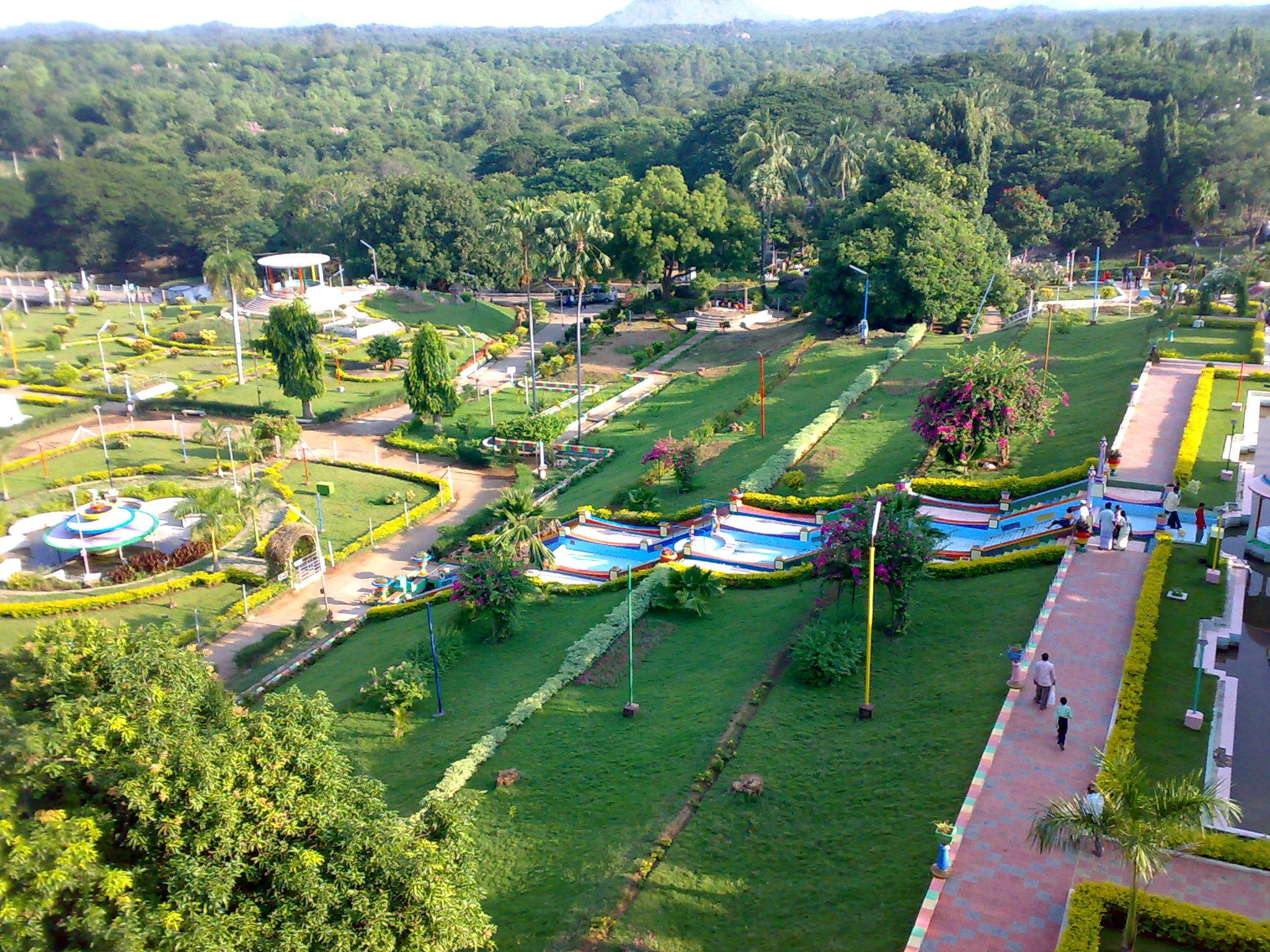
- Sathanur Dam Park

- Location in Tamil Nadu, India
- Official name: Lower Sathanur dam project
- Country: India
- Location: Sathanur, Thandarampet taluk, Tiruvannamalai district, Tamil Nadu
- Coordinates: 12°08′00.34″N 78°56′48.65″E
- Purpose: Irrigation
- Status: 2
- Construction began: 1953
- Opening date: 1958
- Construction cost: ₹3.59 Crore

Dam and spillways
- Type of dam: Gravity
- Impounds: Ponniar River
- Height (foundation): 119 ft (36 m)
- Length: 4,500.59 m (14,766 ft)
- Spillways: 122
- Spillway type: OGEE
- Spillway capacity: 9,061 m^{3}/s (320,000 cu ft/s)

Reservoir
- Creates: Sathanur Reservoir
- Total capacity: 229.4 MCM or 8.10 tmc ft
- Catchment area: 7,300.43 km^{2} (2,818.71 sq mi)

Sathanur Dam which forms the Sathanur reservoir, is one of the major dams in Tamil Nadu. It is constructed across the Thenpennai River also called as Pennaiyar River in Thandarampet taluk among Chennakesava Hills. The dam can be reached by road 30 km (19 mi) from Tiruvannamalai City. It was constructed in 1958. There is also a large crocodile farm and a fish grotto. Parks are maintained inside the dam for tourists to visit and the gardens have been used by the film industry. Sathanur dam and reservoir is the third largest in Tamil Nadu after Mettur and Bhavanisagar.

== History ==
The Sathanur Dam Project was proposed in the First Five Year Plans of India and started in the year 1953. The Dam works are completed in the Second Five Year Plans of India and is operational from 1958. The project was inaugurated by the then Chief Minister of Tamil Nadu K. Kamaraj. This is one of the Major irrigation schemes were planned in Kamaraj's period . The other projects are Lower Bhavani, Krishnagiri Dam, Mani Muthuar, Cauvery Delta, Aarani River, Vaigai Dam, Amravathi, Sathanur, Pullambadi, Parambikulam and Neyaru Dams.

The approved cost of the project is ₹2.02 Crores. The project was completed within ₹3.59 Crore (Actual cost). The project is covered under CADA (Command Area Development Authority) Scheme.

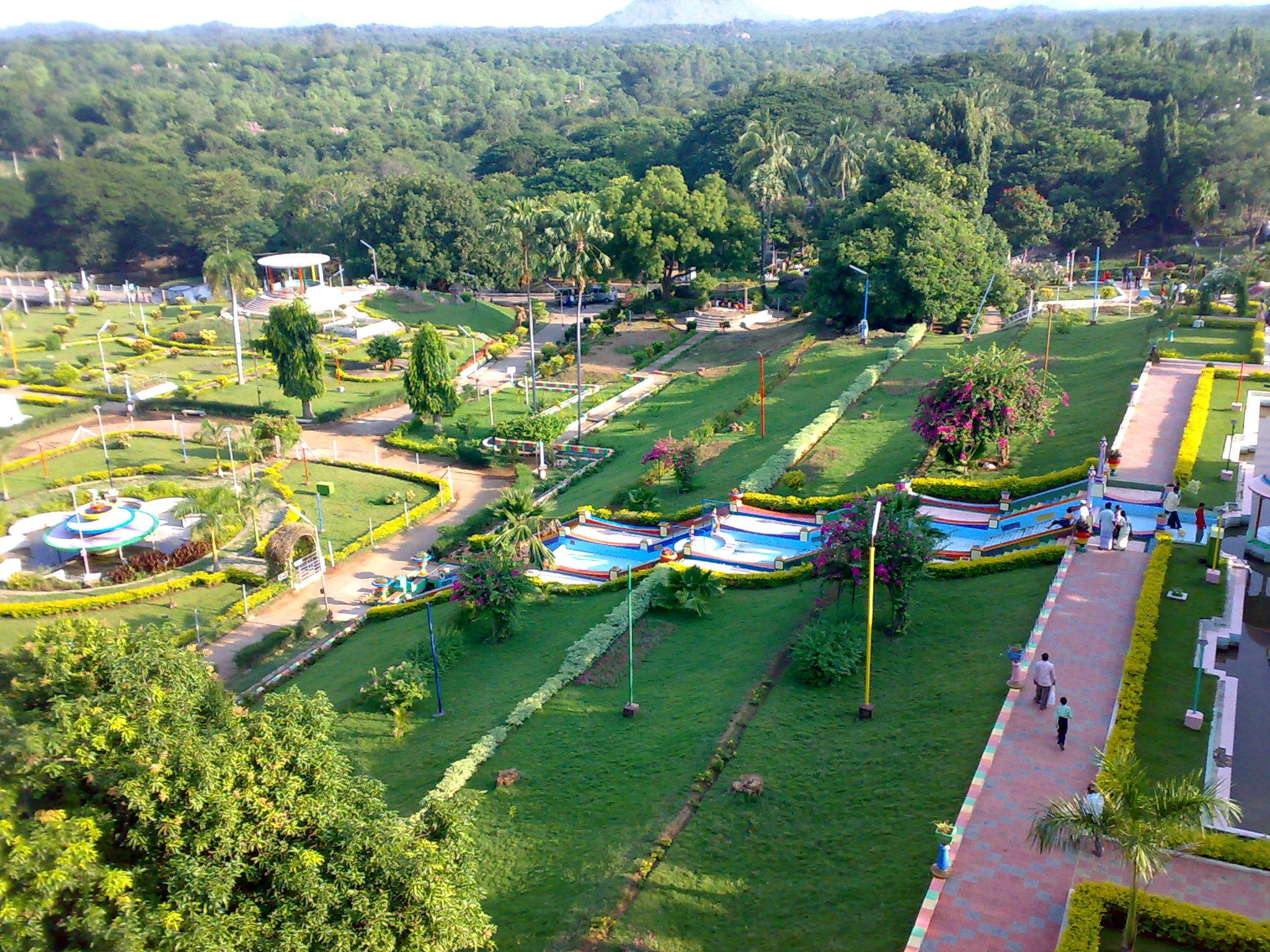
A view of the park from the bridge across the dam

== Technical details ==
The dam has an effective storage capacity of 7,321,000,000 cu ft (207,300,000 m^{3}) with a full level of 119 ft (36 m). An area of 7,185 ha (17,750 acres) of land is benefited by the left bank canal and 100 ha (250 acres) of land is benefited by the right bank canal in Thandrampet and Thiruvannamalai blocks. The dam is a popular picnic area in the region.

== See also ==
- List of dams and reservoirs in India

sovoor
