= Pancharai Gram Panchayat =

Village in Tamil Nadu, India

Pancharai Panch rai
- Village Panchayat
- Location in Tamil Nadu, India Pancharai (India)
- Coordinates: 12.235440°N 79.07832°E
- Country: India
- State: Tamil Nadu
- District: Tiruvannamalai

Population (2011)
  - Total: 910

Languages
  - Official: Tamil
- Time zone: UTC+5:30 (IST)

Pancharai Gram Panchayat is a village located in Tellar district in Thiruvannamalai district of Tamil Nadu. This panchayat falls under Vandavasi Assembly Constituency and Arani Lok Sabha Constituency. This panchayat has a total of 7 panchayat constituencies. 7 Panchayat Council members are elected from these. According to the 2011 India census, the total population is 910. Among them 430 are females and 480 are males.The nearest town is Desur which is located around 4 km away from this village.

Pancharai Pin code is 604501 and postal head office is Desur .

Sivanam ( 1 KM ) , Achamangalam ( 2 KM ) , Korakottai ( 3 KM ) , Kilnamandi ( 3 KM ) , Seeyamangalam ( 4 KM ) are the nearby Villages to Pancharai.

== Basic Facilities ==
The following information has been compiled according to the 2015 th data of the Tamil Nadu Rural Development and Panchayat Department.

Basic Facilities	Total No.
Water Connection	49
Bore Motor Pump	1
Hand Pump	4
Upper level reservoir tanks	3
Ground level water tanks	
Local government buildings	7
Government school buildings	4
Ponds or Wells	6
Play ground	1
Market	3
Panchayat Union Roads	28
Panchayat roads	4
Bus Stand	3
Graveyard or Incinerations	4

== Villages ==
List of villages located in this panchayat:

1. Chittatur
2. Pancharai
3. Adi Dravidar Colony
