= Adamangalam-Pudur =

- township
- Nickname: Swaminatha Udayar Nallor
- Location in Tamil Nadu, India
- Coordinates: 12°27′N 79°3′E
- Country: India
- State: Tamil Nadu
- District: Tiruvannamalai
- Town panchayat: 1996
- Named after: Tamil Name (ஆதமங்கலம் புதூர்)

Government
  - Type: Town panchayat
  - Body: pachayat
- Elevation: 181 m (594 ft)

Population (2010)
  - Total: 21,000

Languages
  - Official: Tamil
- Time zone: UTC+5:30 (IST)
- PIN: 606901
- Vehicle registration: TN-25
- Coastline: 0 kilometres (0 mi)
- Nearest city: Thiruvannamalai, Polur, Kalasapakkam, Thirupattur
- Sex ratio: female-994:Male-1000 ♂/♀
- Lok Sabha constituency: Thiruvannamalai
- Vidhan Sabha constituency: Kalasapakkam
- Avg. summer temperature: 36 °C (97 °F)
- Avg. winter temperature: 17 °C (63 °F)

Adamangalam-Pudur is a village panchayat in the foot of Javvadu hill ranges in the Kalasapakkam Taluk of Tiruvannamalai district, Tamil Nadu, India. It has a population of 2,100. It is nearly 20 km from the nearby town Polur and 40 km from the district capital. The Famous Manju Virattu is held on pongal once a year. It was arranged by the people of Adamangalam Pudhur and the Agamudayar community. Thousands of peoples enjoy the Manju Virattu event .

== Geography ==
It is located at 12°25′0″N 79°6′0″E at an elevation of 181 m above MSL.
