= Perungattur =

- village
- Location in Tamil Nadu, India Perungattur (India)
- Coordinates: 12°45′4″N 79°31′43″E
- Country: India
- State: Tamil Nadu
- District: Tiruvannamalai

Population (2001)
  - Total: 8,000

Languages
  - Official: Tamil
- Time zone: UTC+5:30 (IST)
- PIN: 604402

Perungattur is a village located in Tiruvannamalai district, Tamil Nadu, South India. It is suburb of Cheyyar town. Its 24 km away from the temple town Kanchipuram.

== Population ==
The population of this village is about 5000 where in it has 2500 votes as per election commission of India; 1200 male votes and 1300 female votes.

== Festivals ==
There is a Srinivasar Perumal temple. In the Brahmin street once more than 50 Brahmin families were living. All these families shifted out from the village, as all the younger generation of each family has settled in various cities in India and other countries. In Srinivasar temple during the Tamil month Margazi devotees were distributed Ven Pongal/ sarkarai Pongal in all 30 days morning time. There is a Hanuman temple and Lord Ganesh Temple alongside the main road of the village.

The people of this village celebrate a number of festivals throughout the year. The main celebrations are ADI THIRUVIZA (mari amman and ponni amman).Venugopalaswamy(Sorgavasal thirapu, Uriadi) and Muthu mari Amman Kovil THIRUVIZHA in Pongal (every 17 January).

== Entertainment and sports ==
The MCC - Magandril Cricket Club was formed in early 1992. Each year in the month of May a cricket tournament is conducted across the division and surrounding villages participate.

Ponds - There are two large ponds In village. They go dry by the mid summer.

The Dr. Ambedkar Kabaddi Kuzhu formed in 30 years ago. Each year in the month of January a Kabaddi tournament in conducted across the division and surrounding villages and towns participate.

== Facilities ==
In the village there is a Government Higher secondary school with more than 500 students studying and having large ground where inter schools district level sports events happen.

In the village there is Government Hospital having facility of more than 25 beds which serves the surrounding villages for delivery (normal/cesarean) and all other diseases. Doctor shri.M. Sengaottaiyan served his entire career till his retirement in this hospital as Chief doctor and still rendering his service to perungattur and the nearby villagers through his private Nursing home and dispensary.

In and around the villages there are many professional and arts colleges. There is a government secondary school in the village. There was a theater (Ravi Thirai Arangam)in the village which got wound up due to the evolution of Cable TV in the villages around .

Indian Bank is located and it serves in and around different villages for the past 60 + years . Post office is located in main road. Electricity Board's AE office is located in the main road of the village.

== Transportation ==
There are train stations at nearby Arakonam and Vellore katpadi.

The village is well connected by public transport. Buses are available from Chennai, Arcot, Kanchipuram, Vellore, Cheyyar, Vandavasi, Polur, and Tindivanam.
