= Kasthambadi =

Village in Tamil Nadu of India

Kasthambadi is a village in Tamil Nadu of India, located between Arni and Polur on the state highway to Thiruvannamalai. It is well known for its temples, including the ancient Sivan temple. Places of interest near Kasthambadi include the Sathanur Dam, the Javadhu hills and Jamunamarathoor.
