= Vadugappattu =

Vadugappattu is a village in Tiruvannamalai district, Tamil Nadu, India. It is located 96 km from Chennai.

Tiruvannamalai and Tiruvethipuram are the district and sub-district headquarters of Vadugapattu village respectively. As per 2009 stats, Vadugapattu village is itself a gram panchayat.

The total geographical area of village is 170.7 hectares. According to Census 2011 information Vadugapattu has a total population of 840 peoples. There are about 191 houses in Vadugapattu village. Thiruvethipuram is nearest town to Vadugapattu which is approximately 10 km away.

The nearest city is Tiruvettipuram. The Cheyyar River, originating from the Javvadhu Hills, runs through the southern part of the town Cheyyar (Tiruvettipuram).

Spread over an area of 10.76 km^{2}. With a population of over 3,201, the economy of the town revolves around the manufacture of Cotton lungies and Sarees products.

The hot and dry climate prevailing in the region has been one of the various factors contributing to the growth of the hosiery industry in the town.
