= Nambedu =

- village
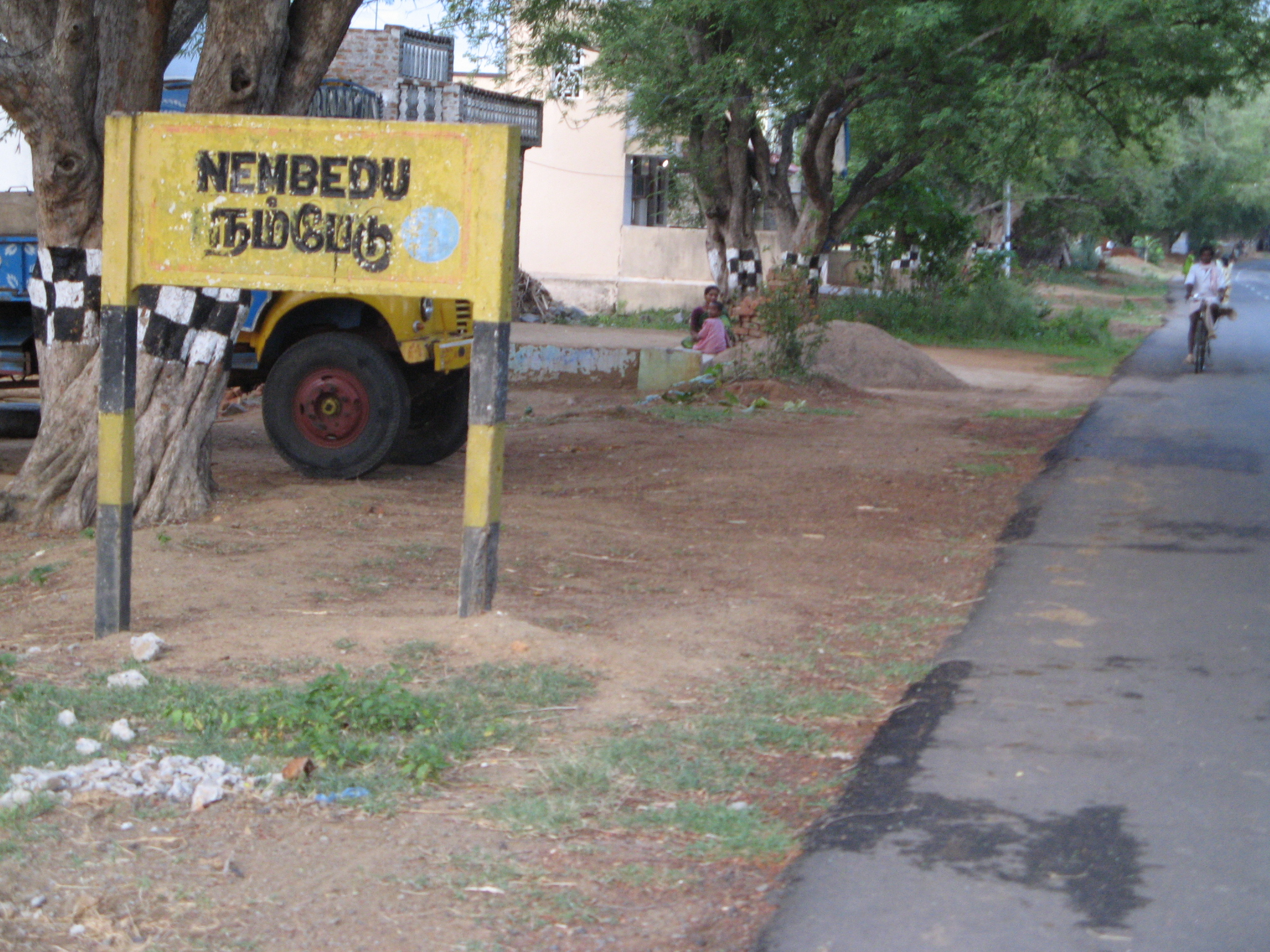

- Location in Tamil Nadu, India Nambedu (India)
- Coordinates: 12.478889°N 79.302222°E
- Country: India
- State: Tamil Nadu
- District: Thiruvannaamalai

Languages
  - Official: Tamil
- Time zone: UTC+5:30 (IST)

Nambedu is a village in Thiruvannaamalai district in the Indian state of Tamil Nadu.

== Geography ==
Nambedu is located at 12.478889°N 79.302222°E.

Nambedu is a village, close to small towns Cheththuppattu and Devikaapuram. Other small villages like Savarappoondi, Parikalpattu, Devimangalam, Karuppur are connected by Nambedu. Nambedu is easily accessible by road which is located on the State highway ( Polur - Chennai ).

== People and Festivals ==
People in Nambedu were basically identified by the name of their family. However, recently after census, the streets were named and houses were numbered.

Most of the dwellers are Hindus and the rest are Christians.

The famous festivals such as Pongal (harvest festival), Deepaavali (festival of lights), Thamizh new year, Ugaadi are celebrated every year by the communion of family and friends.

== Climate ==
Nambedu is located in south peninsular part of India and it is tropical and hot. Whenever there is short of rainfall by delay or failure of southwest monsoon, leads to the drought. Summer will be above 35 °C and winter will be less than 21 °C.

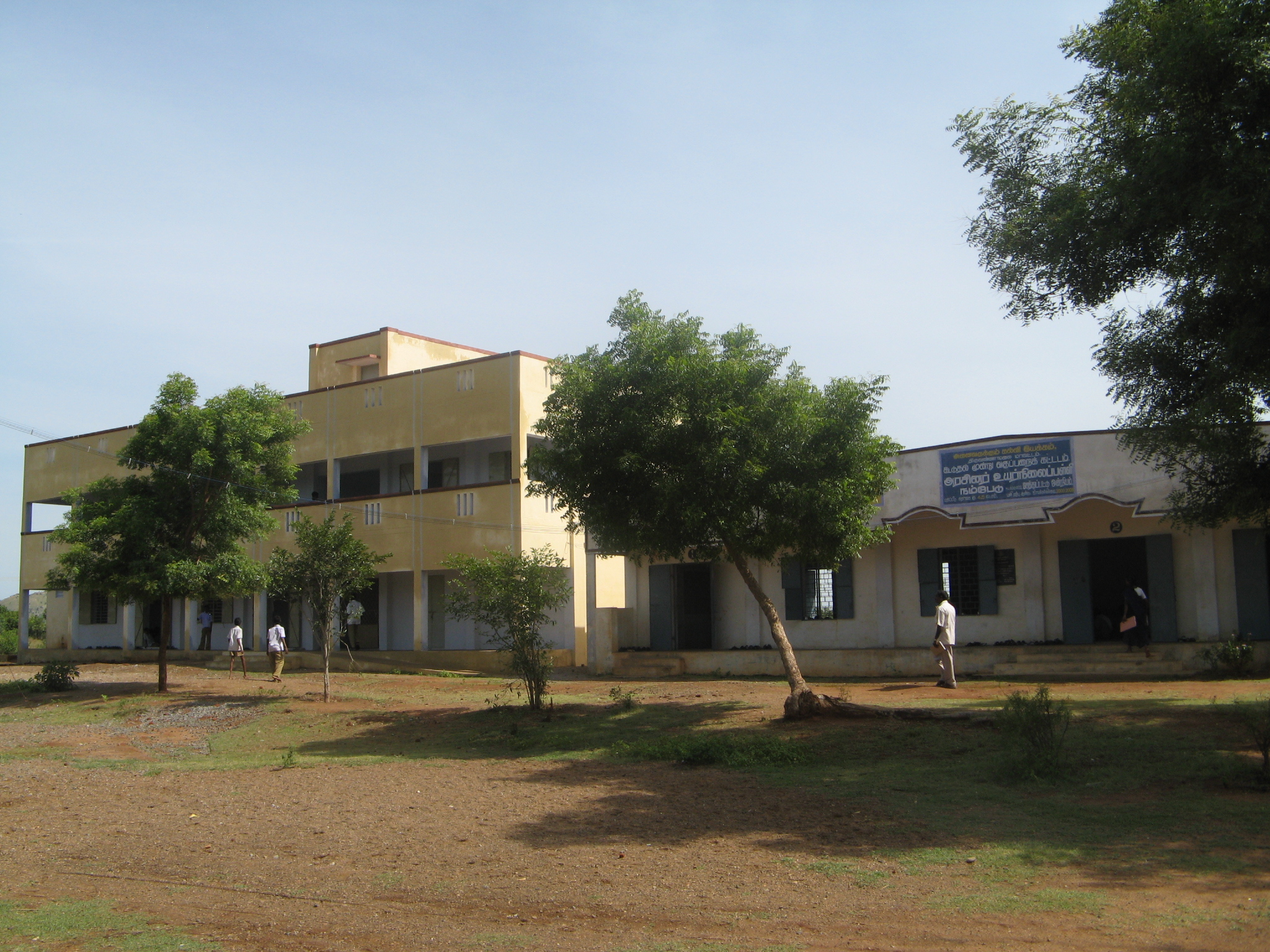
Nambedu High School

== Economy ==
Agriculture is the main livelihood in Nambedu. This includes both subsistence farming and intensive farming. They grow subsistence crops like millets (pearl millet, finger millet, and Sorghum), pulses (Moong, Toor, Urud), peas (snow peas), egg plant (brinjal), roots (radish, beet, sweet potatoes), ground nuts, red chillies, caster plants. Sugarcane, paddy, and banana are grown in large fields as cash crops. Mostly millets, pulses, groundnuts are cultivated by rainfed farming, and rest of crops are cultivated either water from deep dug wells or from channels (from lakes or small ponds).
