= Thandarampattu taluk =

Thandarampatu taluk or Thandrampet is a taluk of Tiruvannamalai district of the Indian state of Tamil Nadu. The headquarters is the town of Thandarampattu.

== Demographics ==
According to the 2011 census, the taluk of Thandrampattu had a population of 1,78,959 with 89,912 males and 89,047 females. There were 990 women for every 1000 men. The taluk had a literacy rate of 59.67. Child population in the age group below 6 was 11,051 Males and 10,101 Females. Thandarampet Govt Hr sec School representing for Hockey in the state level competitions in every year Since 1990.
