= Akkur, Tiruvannamalai =

Akkur
- village
- Interactive map of Akkur
- Coordinates: 12.6811319°N 79.6387339°E
- Country: India
- State: Tamil Nadu
- District: Thiruvannamalai

Languages
  - Official: Tamil
- Time zone: UTC+5:30 (IST)

Akkur is a village in Tiruvannamalai district in Tamil Nadu, India, located 20 km (12 mi) from Kanchipuram. According to archaeologists, the village originated as the amalgamation of six hamlets: Samburanatham, Singili Pattarai, Thatha Pattarai, Dhaneswaran Modu, Purangavasam, and Srinivasapuram.

Akkur is known for an ancient temple, Sri Ambujavalli Nayika Sametha Sri Lakshminarayana Perumal, which is approximately 700 years old. Renovation of the temple was completed in 2003.
