= Kizh-Pennathur =

Kilpennathur Kilpennathur
- Town Panchayat
- Location in Tamil Nadu, India
- Coordinates: 12°15′31″N 79°13′51″E
- Country: India
- State: Tamil Nadu
- District: Tiruvanamalai

Population (2001)
  - Total: 12,504

Languages
  - Official: Tamil
- Time zone: UTC+5:30 (IST)
- Postal code: 604 601
- Vehicle registration: TN 25

Kilpennathur is a Panchayat Town in Tiruvanamalai district in the Indian state of Tamil Nadu. Kilpennathur is one of the taluks of Tiruvannamalai district and an assembly constituency of Tamil Nadu. The MLA of Kilpennathur assembly constituency is DMK party Mr. K. Pichandi. Vettavalam is the most populous town panchayat in this taluk. Kilpennathur is located a 12.25 degrees latitude and 79.224 degrees longitude. Nearest towns are Avalurpet (north - 10 km), Vettavalam (south - 23 km), Gingee (east - 23 km) and Tiruvannamalai (west - 16 km), and Chennai is about 177 km away.

== Demographics ==
As of 2001 India census, Kilpennathur had a population of 12,504. Males constitute 50% of the population and females 50%. Kilpennathur has an average literacy rate of 65%, higher than the national average of 59.5%; male literacy is 74%, and female literacy is 56%. In Kilpennathur, 12% of the population is under 6 years of age.

Kilpennathur is a Town Panchayat city in district of Tiruvannamalai, Tamil Nadu. The Kilpennathur city is divided into 15 wards for which elections are held every 5 years. The Kilpennathur Town Panchayat has population of 13,718 of which 6,902 are males while 6,816 are females as per report released by Census India 2011.

Population of Children with age of 0–6 is 1557 which is 11.35% of total population of Kilpennathur (TP). In Kilpennathur Town Panchayat, the female sex ratio is 988 against state average of 996. Moreover, the child sex ratio in Kilpennathur is around 951 compared to Tamil Nadu state average of 943. The literacy rate of Kilpennathur city is 80.12% higher than the state average of 80.09%. In Kilpennathur, male literacy is around 88.91% while the female literacy rate is 71.27%.

There are approximately 150 houses/huts in the village as of 2020, 95% of which are electrified. The Meenakshi Sundareshwarar Temple about 800 year old temple as indicated by the "Maraya Samburvaraya" inscription.

== Schools ==
There are two primary government schools - East and West Primary, and three private schools - SAN, Jayam-CBSE and Sastra schools. Government high schools are: Boys Higher Secondary, Girls Higher Secondary, Rajathoppu School. In addition, the Ramu Reddiar High School and Karungali Kuppam are government aided. Jayam-CBSE and Sastra schools also provide high school education. There are two colleges - DIET Kilpennathur (Diploma in Teacher Training) and Jayam College (B. Ed).

== Agriculture ==
Agriculture is the primary source of employment. Crops grown include tea, various vegetables, fruits and flowers.
