= Devanambattu =

Devanampattu
- village
- Location in Tamil Nadu, India Devanampattu (India)
- Coordinates: 12°15′41″N 79°2′12″E
- Country: India
- State: Tamil Nadu
- District: Tiruvannamalai

Languages
  - Official: Tamil
- Time zone: UTC+5:30 (IST)
- PIN: 606802
- Area code: 04175

Devanampattu is a village in Tiruvannamalai district in the Indian state of Tamil Nadu. It is located 17 kilometers northwest of Tiruvannamalai town. The village can be accessed from Tiruvannamalai by taking town buses 50 and 51.

== Geography ==
Devanampattu, Kattuputhur, Umayalpuram, and MGR Nagar are four villages that come under Thurinjapuram Union, but primarily called as Devanampattu (one of the big panchayat in Thurinjapuram Union). This area also has a vast and widespread thorny forest with Eucalyptus trees planted by Forest dept. The village has huge pond surrounded with Banyan trees which makes the place scenic. There are thousands of huge bats living on top of the Banyan trees. It is unusual to find bats of that size. Hunting the bats is prohibited by the village. Violators are punished for hunting these bats. Kattuputhur village also has a big lake which gets excess rain water from the forest nearby.

=== Climate ===
Devanampattu has a tropical climate. Summer months (April - July) are very hot and the temperature goes up to 110 °F. Water may be scarce sometimes during the summer.

== Economy ==
Devanampattu is primarily an agricultural community. Rice (paddy), sugar cane, and groundnuts (peanuts) are the main crops grown. Farmers mainly depend on monsoon rains which is good for 6 months. Crops are grown by well irrigation and Canal irrigation. The village has a commercial bank.

== Culture ==
=== Festivals ===
Devanampattu also has the Lord Murugan temple on a small hill. From the hill, the surrounding village and farms can be seen. Several festivals happen at this temple, namely the Surasamharam, Sasti a few days after Deepavali

== Education ==
Kattuputhur has government primary, middle and high schools.
