= Thandrampet block =

Revenue block in India

Thandrampet block is a revenue block in the Tiruvannamalai district of Tamil Nadu, India. It has a total of 47 panchayat villages.
