= Thurinjapuram =

Thurinjapuram thurunjapuram
- panchayat town
- Location in Tamil Nadu, India Thurinjapuram (India)
- Coordinates: 12°19′07″N 79°05′44″E
- Country: India
- State: Tamil Nadu
- District: Tiruvannamalai
- Elevation: 181 m (594 ft)

Population (2010)
  - Total: 14,000

Languages
  - Official: Tamil
- Time zone: UTC+5:30 (IST)
- PIN: 606805
- Vehicle registration: TN-25
- Coastline: 0 kilometres (0 mi)
- Nearest city: Thiruvannamlai, Polur, Kalasapakkam
- Lok Sabha constituency: thiruvannamlai
- Vidhan Sabha constituency: Kilpennathur
- Avg. summer temperature: 35 °C (95 °F)
- Avg. winter temperature: 19 °C (66 °F)

Thurinjapuram is a village in Tiruvannamalai taluk of Tiruvannamalai district, Tamil Nadu India. Thurinjapuram village has a gram panchayat.
