= Naidumangalam =

Nayudumangalam Agaram Sibbandi
- township
- Location in Tamil Nadu, India
- Coordinates: 12°20′0″N 79°6′0″E
- Country: India
- State: Tamil Nadu
- District: Tiruvannamalai
- Elevation: 134 m (440 ft)

Population (2010)
  - Total: 8,400

Languages
  - Official: Tamil
- Time zone: UTC+5:30 (IST)
- PIN: 606802
- Vehicle registration: TN-25
- Coastline: 0 kilometres (0 mi)
- Nearest city: Thiruvannamlai, Polur, Kalasapakkam, Thurunjapuram
- Lok Sabha constituency: Thiruvannamlai
- Vidhan Sabha constituency: Kilpennatore
- Avg. summer temperature: 35 °C (95 °F)
- Avg. winter temperature: 19 °C (66 °F)

Nayudumangalam is a township in Tiruvannamalai Taluk of Tiruvanamalai district, Tamil Nadu, India. It has a population of 8,400 and an altitude of 134m.

The Tamil Nadu government has announced that there will be one SIPCOT built at Naidumanglam.

== Transport ==
=== Road ===
This town lies on national highway NH 234, which runs from Mangalore.

=== Rail ===
The nearest railway station Agaram Sibbandi is on the Vellore-Thiruvannamalai rail route, about 17 km from Thiruvannamalai. The station is operated by the Southern Railway. To the north, Vellore Cantonment the main station next to Polur. To the south, Thiruvannamalai railway Station is the nearest major station.
