= Mullandrum =

Mullandiram Mullai vanam
- Village
- Location within Tamil Nadu Location within India
- Coordinates: 12.8296°N 79.32435°E
- Country: India
- State: Tamil Nadu
- District: Tiruvanamalai
- Time zone: UTC+05:30 (IST)
- Pincode: 632512

Mullandrum is a village in Tiruvanamalai district in the state of Tamil Nadu, India. The postal code of Mullandrum is 632512. The name "Mulladrum" is derived from Mullai Vanam. Also called as "Mulladhiram".

== Geography ==
It is located about 38 km (24 miles) from Vellore, 60 km (37 miles) from Thiruvannamalai, 8 km (5 miles) from Timiri, 14 km (9 miles) from Arani.

== About Mullandram ==
Mullandram is a village in Arani Taluk in Tiruvannamalai District of Tamil Nadu State, India. It is located 77 km (48 miles) towards North from District headquarters Thiruvannamalai, 17 km (11 miles) from Arani. It is 130 km (81 miles) from state capital Chennai.

Postal head office is Timiri .

Vettiyantholuvam 7 km (4 miles), Morappanthangal9 km (6 miles), Sirumur 9 km (6 miles), Athimalaipatt 11 km (7 miles), Ariyapadi 11 km (7 miles) are the nearby Villages to Mullandram. Mullandram is surrounded by Kaniyambadi Taluk towards west, Arcot Taluk towards North, Arani Taluk towards South, West Arani Taluk towards South .

Arcot, Vellore, Tiruvethipuram, Polur are the nearby Cities to Mullandram.

This Place is in the border of the Tiruvannamalai District and Vellore District. Vellore District Timiri is East towards this place .

=== Demographics of Mullandram ===
Tamil is the Local Language here.

=== By Rail ===
There is no railway station near to Mullandram in less than 10 km (6 miles). However Katpadi junction Rail Way Station is major railway station 25 km (16 miles) near to Mullandram Next railway station near to mullandram is Wallajah road junction.

=== Colleges near Mullandram ===
1. Arunachala College Of Engineering For Women
2. Dr. M.G.R Chokalingam Arts College
3. Sniit Computer College Academy
4. Sri Balaji Chockalingam Engineering College

=== Schools in Mullandram ===
1. Government Higher Secondary School
2. Sri Saraswathi Vidya Mandir
3. Government Elementary School
4. Government Anganvadi School
5. A.C.S Matriculation Higher Secondary School

=== Temples in Mulladrum ===
1. Sri Renuga Devi
2. Ishwaran Temple
3. Perumal Temple
4. Yogalingeshwarar Temple, KK Thoppu
