= Thyagi Annamalai Nagar =

- Town panchayat
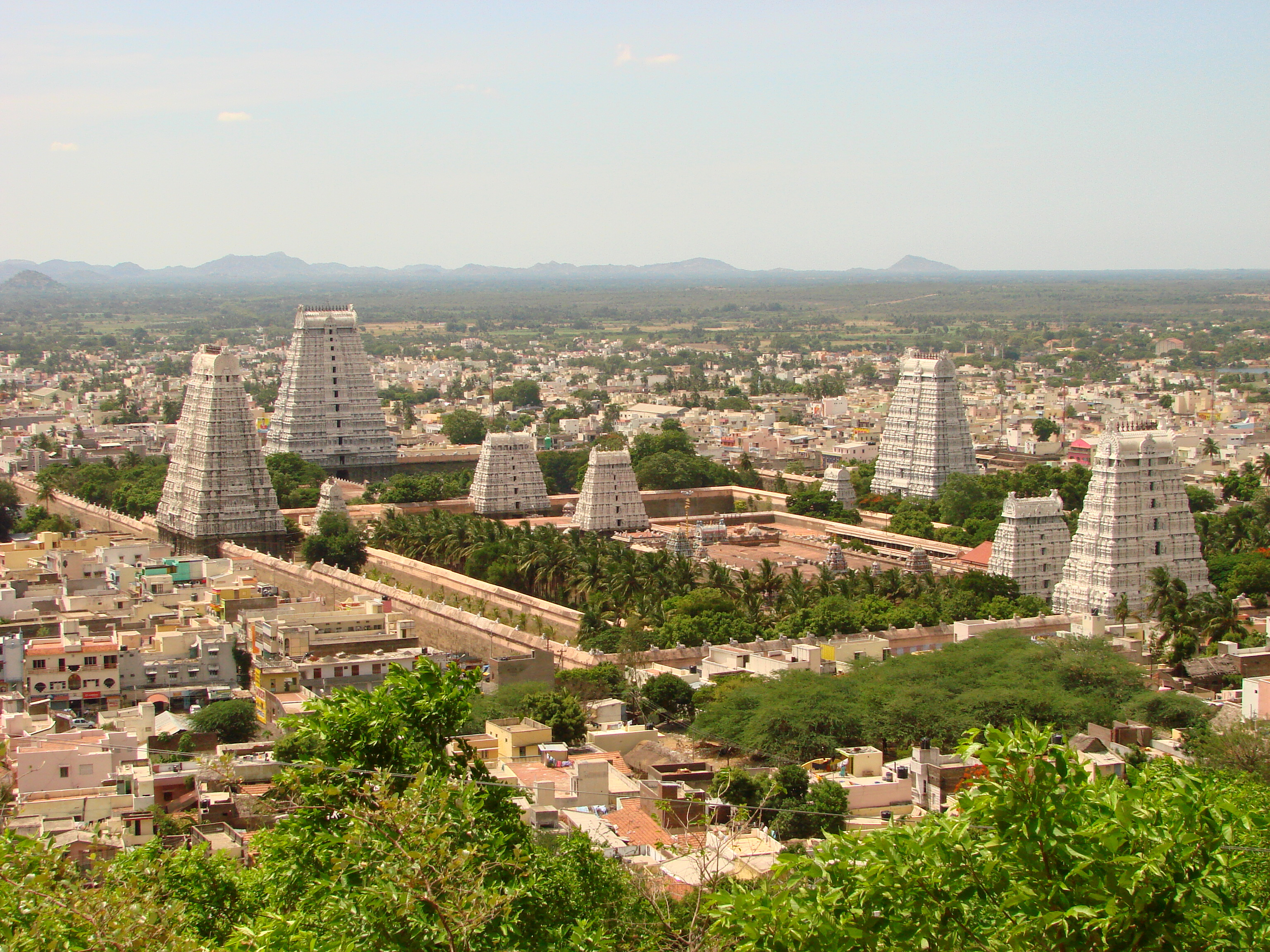

- Location in Tamil Nadu, India
- Coordinates: 12.22°N 79.11°E
- Country: India
- State: Tamil Nadu
- District: Tiruvannamalai

Government
  - Chairman: ravi kumar (dmk)

Area
  - Total: 16.3 km^{2} (6.3 sq mi)
- Elevation: 171 m (561 ft)

Population (2012)
  - Total: 22,987
  - Density: 1,410/km^{2} (3,650/sq mi)

Languages
  - Official: Tamil
- Time zone: UTC+5:30 (IST)
- Telephone code: 91-4175
- Vehicle registration: TN 25
- Lok Sabha constituency: thiruvannamlai
- Vidhan Sabha constituency: thiruvannamalai city
- Climate: moderate (Köppen)
- Avg. summer temperature: 41 °C (106 °F)
- Avg. winter temperature: 18 °C (64 °F)

Thyagi annamalai nagar, also known as Thyagi annamalaipuram or T.A.Nagar, is a 1st-grade town panchayat constructed as a 3rd-grade town panchayat in 1994 and upgraded to 2nd grade in 2002 (at this time Lakshmipuram is carved out and joined into Gandhinagar) and 1st grade in 2007. It is located in Tiruvannamalai district, Tamil Nadu, India.

Thyagi Annamalai nagar has declined in population in census due to carving to its sub-area Laksmipuram because main T.nagar comprises population of 19,000 and Lakshmipuram has a population of 11,000 in 2001 census totally. 30,000 is the population of Thyagi Anamalai Nagar. But in 2011, T. Anagar had its own population of 23,000.

== Demographics ==
T.nagar having population of over 23,000 providing sub urban to Tiruvannamalai urbanity. it comes under Tiruvannamalai urban agglomerations on Pondicherry road NH 66. Thiruvannamali junction and Thiruvannamalai central are located in the limit of T.nagar town panchayat.
