= Pudupalayam =

- Panchayat town
- Location in Tamil Nadu, India Pudupalayam (India)
- Coordinates: 12°21′50″N 78°52′53″E
- Country: India
- State: Tamil Nadu
- District: Tiruvanamalai

Population (2001)
  - Total: 10,110

Languages
  - Official: Tamil
- Time zone: UTC+5:30 (IST)

Pudupalayam is a panchayat town in Chengam taluk of Tiruvanamalai district in the Indian state of Tamil Nadu. Its pincode number is 606 705.It is well connected with Tiruvannamalai and Bangalore. This is at Bangalore Road at 33 km away from the famous Annamalaiyar Temple located in Thiruvannamalai.

== History ==
Formulated during the year 1958, this Town Panchayat consist of 15.6 km^{2}.

== Geography ==
=== Ammakulam tank ===
Ammakulam water tank is situated over an extent of sacus at K.K.Palayam within the Jurisdiction of Pudupalayam Town Panchayat. The Kulam has been formed over on extent of 2 acres, before 150 years during the pevtod of kuigdorn. This tank is the main source of drinking water of the peofoce of K.K.Palayam, G.N.Palayam, Veerananal Samalai and Adivaram around Pudupalayam. 100 Acres of land around this tank are being cultivated.

Being not reamed for long time, Amma Kulam has been taken up by NABARD Scheme under improvement of Drinking water sources with an estimate of Rs. 20.00 Lakhs and renovating works started. By the work of cleaning the silt and renovation of the tank, now the tank overflows resulting benefiting the leads around the tank, to raise water level in the deep bore wells and nearly 500 wells in nearby houses.

== Demographics ==
As of 2001 India census, Pudupalayam had a population of 10,110. Males constitute 49% of the population and females 51%. Pudupalayam has an average literacy rate of 62%, higher than the national average of 59.5%: male literacy is 73%, and female literacy is 53%. In Pudupalayam, 11% of the population is under 6 years of age.

== Administration ==
Pudupalayam Grade Second Town Panchayat is situated within pudupalayam panchayat union, Chengam Taluk and Thiruvannamalai District. In this town panchayat there are 123 Streets in 12 Ward. In this town panchayat.

Pudupalayam Town Panchayat has total administration over 2,652 houses to which it supplies basic amenities like water and sewerage. It is also authorized to build roads within Town Panchayat limits and impose taxes on properties coming under its jurisdiction.

Pudupalayam is also one of the assembly constituencies in Tamil Nadu. Pudupalayam is separated from Chengam suburban Taluk and was announced as a separate and New Taluk by Tamil Nadu's government.

== Amenities ==
In Pudupalayam Town Panchayat 11 Public Health workers and one Sanitary supervisor is engaged in the field of public health. For public health purposes, one Tractor with Tipper engaged to collect the garbage and solid waste generated in the town panchayat area. The above-mentioned vehicles are used to collect the garbage daily in Kalyana Mandabam, Schools, Bus Stops, Temples and other important public areas. The Schools garbage's are segregated and sent to the compost yard.

The door to door solid waste collection was started from December 2007 and done in 8 wards out of 10 wards daily by Pushcarts with the help of women SHG group. The plastic garbage is collected separately and stock at this compost yard. The drainages are cleaned once in week by the sanitary workers. Power spraying is done using baytex and other mosquito killing minerals, once in 15 days in all town panchayat areas

Solid waste collected from door to door is segregated in the compost yard and Biodegradable Solid waste is made into natural manure for agriculture purposes. Other solid waste plastics glass etc. are sold for recycling purposes. The natural manure produced is sold at rate of Rs.5/- kg for agricultural purposes. Thus the solid waste management scheme functions in a profitable manner in this Town Panchayat.

The Town Panchayat has its own compost park which is situated in survey No.17/3 at an extent of 2.5 acres. The Town Panchayat obtained No Objection to above site from Tamil Nadu pollution Control Board. There is a Veeranandal, Pudupalayam, G.N.Palayam, K.K.Palayam in this town panchayat.

== Economy ==
Agri culture is the prime occupation of this Town Panchayat. Pudupalayam has a weekly market on Thursdays and sometimes before important Tamil festivals like Pongal. For this reason, this area called as Santhai Pudupalayam. Santhai means market in Tamil.

== Transport ==
Pudupalayam Town Panchayat Located 34.00 K.M distance from Tiruvannamalai District.

Nearest Railway Station Name :Tiruvannamalai, This Railway Station Located 34.00 k.m Distance from pudupalayam

Nearest Airport Located is Chennai.

Bus Route Details :Polur To Chengam and Tiruvannamalai to Pudupalayam.

== Schools ==
Govt Boys Hr. Sec. School, Govt Girls Hr. Sec. School, Saratha vidhyalaya Nursery and Primary School, St. Arulandar Nursery and Primary School. And two government primary school, one government middle school also available in pudupalayam.
