= Polur taluk =

Polur taluk is a taluk of Tiruvannamalai district of the Indian state of Tamil Nadu. The headquarters is the town of Polur.

== Demographics ==
According to the 2011 census, the taluk of Polur had a population of 457,785 with 229,065 males and 228,720 females. There were 998 women for every 1000 men. The taluk had a literacy rate of 65.23. Child population in the age group below 6 was 25,157 Males and 22,997 Females.

== Arahanthgiri Jain Math ==
Arahanthgiri Jain Math is a Jain Math that was established at the ancient Jain site of Tiruvannaamalai in August, 1998. The complex includes 3 Jain caves, 4 Jain temples and a 16 meter high sculpture of Neminatha thought to date from the 12th century that is the tallest Jain image in Tamil Nadu.
