= Hasanamapet =

Hasanamapet or Hasanamapettai is a village situated at Vembakkam Taluk in Tiruvannamalai district, 25 km by road from Kanchipuram in the Kanchipuram-Cheyyar road. The village was formerly known as Deivanthangal.

It falls under Cheyyar assembly constituency and Arni parliament constituency. There is a matriculation school and a government school.
