= Thandarampattu =

Thandarampattu Gothandarama Pattinam
- Panchayat town
- Location in Tamil Nadu, India
- Coordinates: 12.154°N 78.947°E
- Country: India
- State: Tamil Nadu
- District: Tiruvannamalai

Government
  - panchayat town chairman: Mo Pe Giri MLA
- Elevation: 123 m (404 ft)

Population (2010)
  - Total: 7,601
  - Density: 1,890/km^{2} (4,900/sq mi)

Languages
  - Official: Tamil
- Time zone: UTC+5:30 (IST)
- PIN: 606 (601, 602, 603, 604-609, 611 & 613)
- Telephone code: 91-4188
- Vehicle registration: TN 25
- Lok Sabha constituency: Thiruvannamlai
- Vidhan Sabha constituency: Thandarampattu
- Climate: moderate (Köppen)
- Avg summer temperature: 39 °C (102 °F)
- Avg winter temperature: 24 °C (75 °F)

Thandarampattu is one of the taluk headquarters of Thiruvannamalai district. It had a population of 7,601 in 2011 census. It is 8.0% higher than its 2001 population 6,993. It was formed as 3rd grade town panchayat in 1965 and upgraded as 2nd grade in 1984 and as 1st grade in 1999. Now it is working as 1st grade town panchayat from 9 November 1999 officially. The famous Sathnur Dam is 14 km from Thandrampet, and Thiruvannamalai is 16 km from this town. The famous Lord Veera Ragava Perumal Kovil & Veerabathara Swami Kovil in Thandarampattu, to celebrate Pongal, Karudasevai, New Year Festival, Kirushna Jayanthi and more. The temple contain sub-lords of Yoga Anjaneyar, Sakkarathazhvaar, Gothandaramar, Navagiraga's, and Muthu Vinayagar. Thandarampattu Govt Boys Hr sec School representing in Hockey State level competitions in every year Since 1990.
