= Vettavalam =

Vettavalam Vettaivallam
- Town Panchayat
- Nickname: Singapuram
- Location in Tamil Nadu, India
- Coordinates: 12.1°N 79.25°E
- Country: India
- State: Tamil Nadu
- District: Tiruvanamalai
- Elevation: 211 m (692 ft)

Population (2011)
  - Total: 15,506

Languages
  - Official: Tamil
- Time zone: UTC+5:30 (IST)
- PIN: 606 754
- Telephone code: 91-4175
- Vehicle registration: TN 25

Vettavalam is a first grade panchayat town in Tiruvanamalai district in the Indian state of Tamil Nadu.

== Geography ==
Vettavalam is located at 12.1°N 79.25°E. It has an average elevation of 211 metres (692 feet).

Vettavalam is in between Tiruvannamalai and Villupuram NH38(Villupuram to Mangalore National Highway).

There is a big lake in vettavalam.

Vettavalam is also a popular movie shooting location for the Tamil film industry; it is preferred for outdoor shooting because of its scenic landscape. Movies like Marumalarchi, Saattai, Tiruvakkarai Sri Vakrakaliamman, etc., are shot here.

== Demographics ==
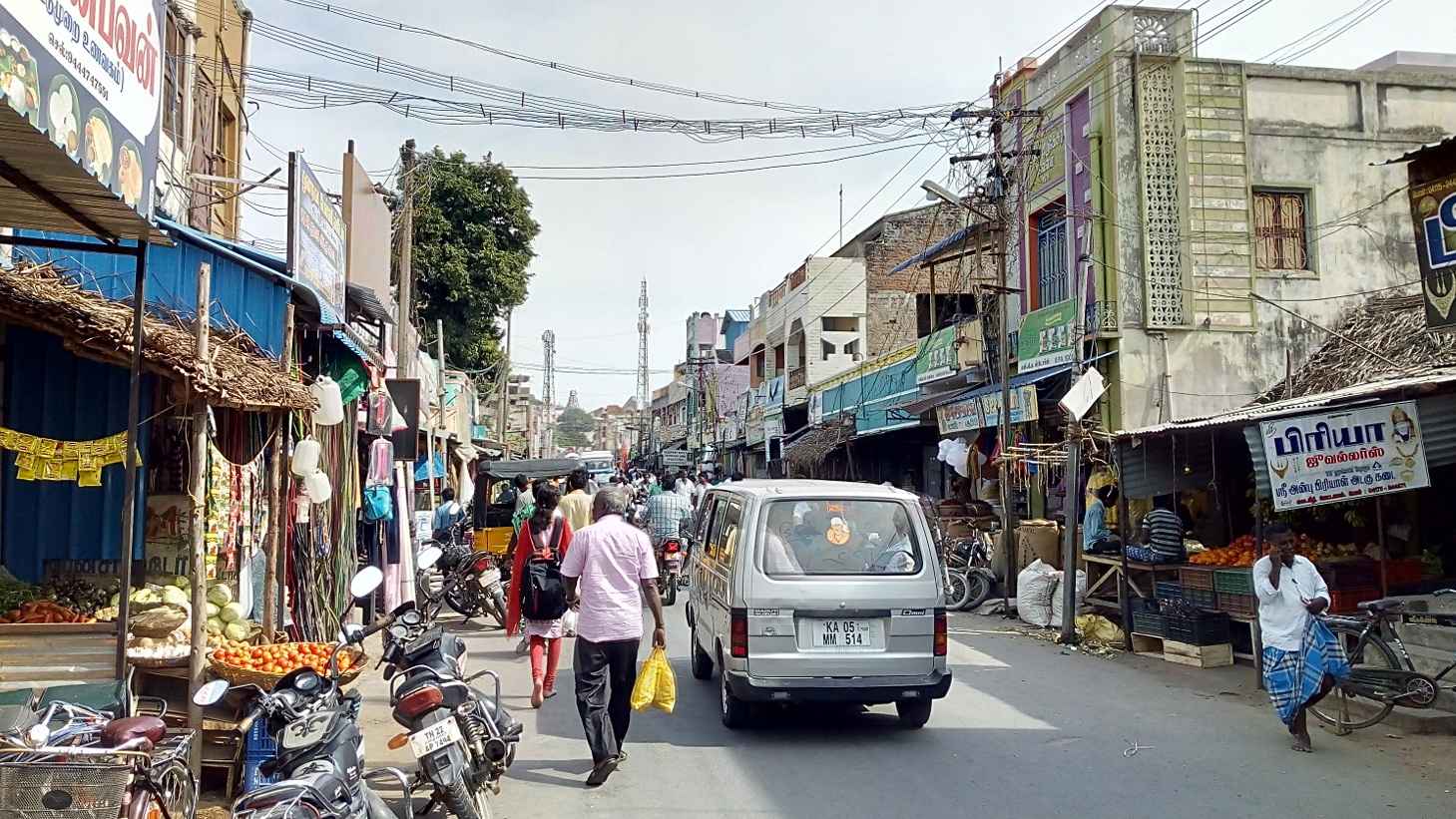
Vettavalam

Vettavalam is a Town Panchayat in district of Tiruvannamalai, Tamil Nadu. Vettavalam is divided into 15 wards for which elections are held every 5 years. The Vettavalam Town Panchayat has population of 15,506 of which 7,681 are males while 7,825 are females as per report released by Census India 2011.

The population of children aged 0-6 is 1709 which is 11.02% of total population of Vettavalam (TP). In Vettavalam Town Panchayat, the female sex ratio is 1019 against state average of 996. Moreover, the child sex ratio in Vettavalam is around 1013 compared to Tamil Nadu state average of 943. The literacy rate of Vettavalam city is 82.46% higher than the state average of 80.09%. In Vettavalam, male literacy is around 89.81% while the female literacy rate is 75.25%.

== Culture ==
=== Agatheeshwarar temple ===
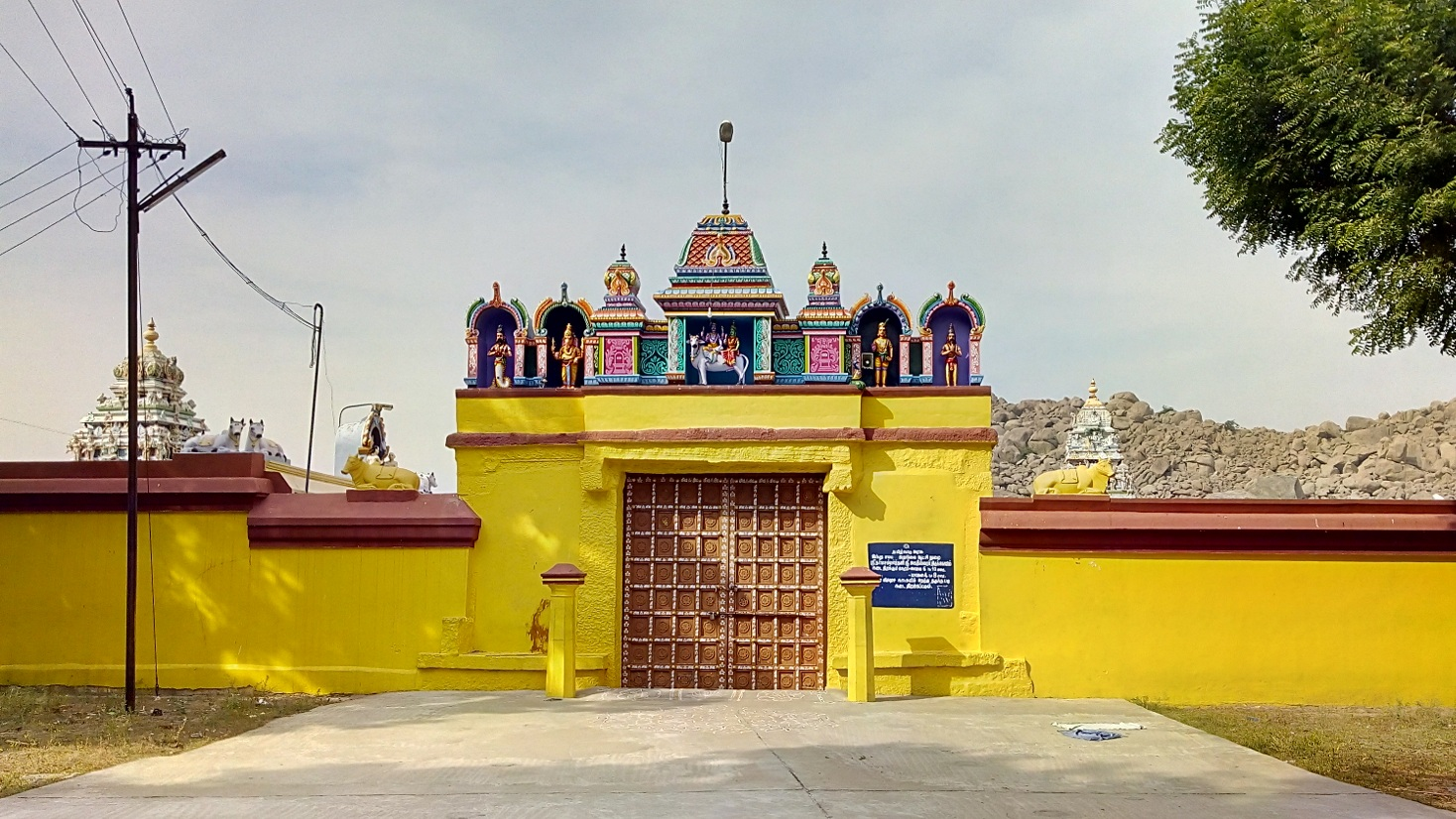
Agatheeshwarar Temple

Vettavalam, also having a hindu temple of Lord Shiva 'Agatheeswarar Temple' and 'Manonmani Amman Temple'at Vettavalam Pazhavalam Road, Kilpennathur village.

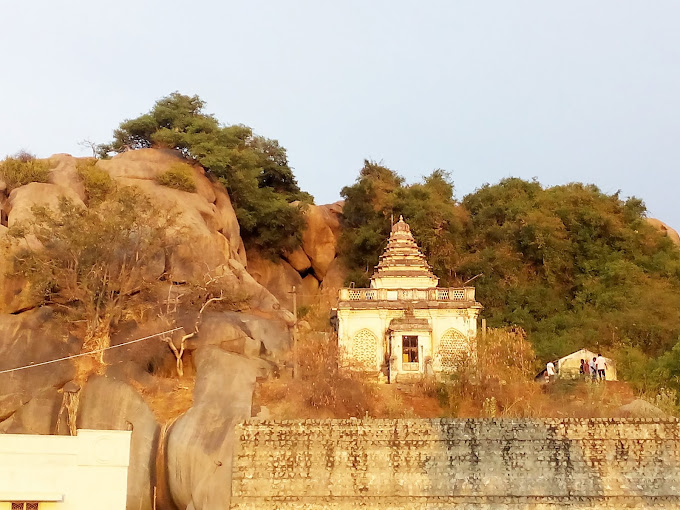
Manonmani Amman Temple

=== St. Immaculate Heart of Mary's Church-St.Joseph Mountain Shrine ===
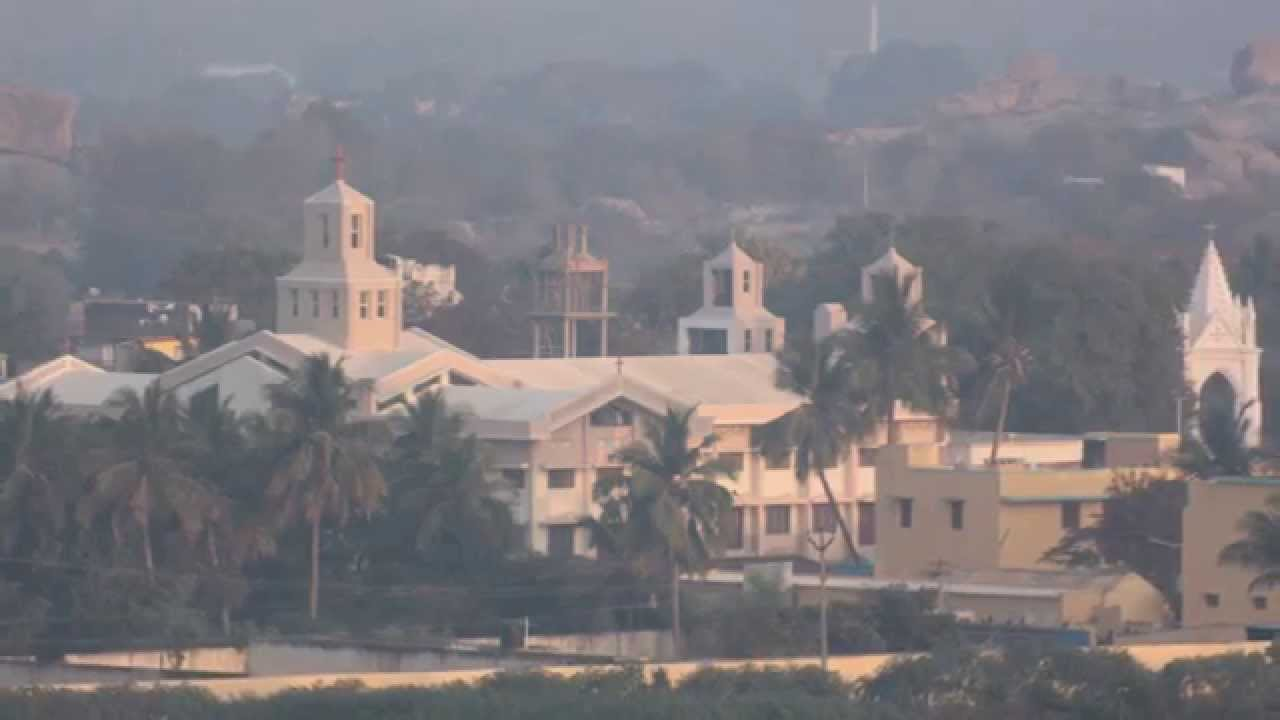
Vettavalam Parish Church Dioceses Of Vellore

Vettavalam has also a church of Immaculate Mary, built in the 18th century. St. Joseph's Shrine, located in the top of the mount built by Fr.Tharas, is also from the 18th century.

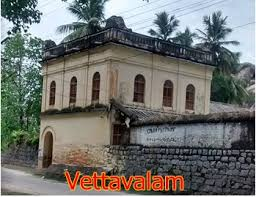
Vettavalam Palace

== Education ==
=== Schools ===
- Government Boys Higher Secondary School
- Government Girls Higher Secondary School
- St. Mary's Boys Higher Secondary School
- St. Aloysius Girls Higher Secondary School
- Moorthy Matriculation Higher Secondary School
- Sri Aruneshwar Matric School
- Good Will Matric School
- Vedha Vidyashram School
- Panchayat Union Primary Schools(Vettavalam West, North and South)
- Panchayat Union Middle School(Vettavalam East)
- Lourdu Annai Matriculation School

=== Colleges ===
- Loyola College

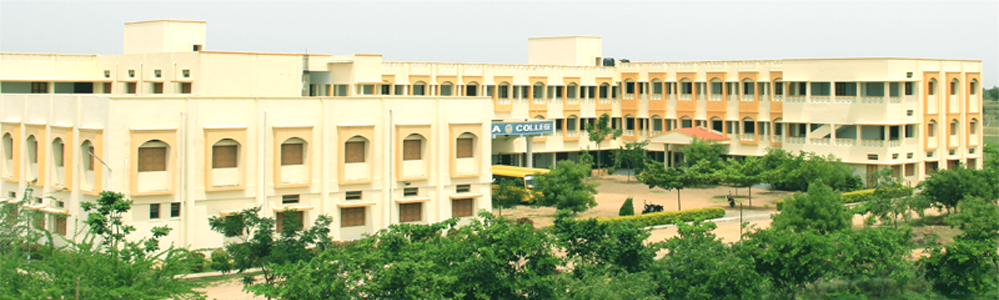
Loyola College, Vettavalam

Loyola College, Vettavalam, started in the academic year 2009–2010, was a pioneering initiative of the Jesuit Madurai Province to develop and strengthen the Jesuit Chennai Mission in the northern parts of Tamil Nadu.

The College started to function from 15 July 2009 with 195 students, having five Under Graduate Degree Courses (English, B.Com., BBA, BCA and B.Sc Computer Science). The official inauguration of the college took place on 31 July 2009, the feast day of St. Ignatius of Loyola, the Founder of the Society of Jesus.
