= Vandavasi taluk =

Settlement in India

Coordinates: 12.5°N 79.62°E

Vandavasi taluk is a taluk of Tiruvannamalai district of the Indian state of Tamil Nadu. The headquarters is the town of Vandavasi.

Among the villages in the taluk is Vedal.

== Demographics ==
According to the 2011 census, the taluk of Vandavasi had a population of 335,507 with 167,480 males and 168,027 females. There were 1003 women for every 1000 men. The taluk had a literacy rate of 67.94. Child population in the age group below 6 was 16,017 Males and 15,486 Females.
