= Kalasapakkam =

Kalasapakkam nallaoor
- Town
- Location in Tamil Nadu, India Kalasapakkam (India)
- Coordinates: 12°25′0″N 79°6′0″E
- Country: India
- State: Tamil Nadu
- District: Tiruvannamalai
- Elevation: 181 m (594 ft)

Population (2011)
  - Total: 47,271

Languages
  - Official: Tamil
- Time zone: UTC+5:30 (IST)
- PIN: 606751
- Telephone code: 04181
- Vehicle registration: TN-25
- Coastline: 0 kilometres (0 mi)
- Nearest city: Thiruvannamlai, Polur
- Lok Sabha constituency: Thiruvannamlai
- Vidhan Sabha constituency: kalasapakkam
- Avg. summer temperature: 35 °C (95 °F)
- Avg. winter temperature: 19 °C (66 °F)

Kalasapakkam is a town on the river bed of Cheyyar River and the headquarters of Kalasapakkam taluk in Tiruvannamalai district, Tamil Nadu, India. It has a population of 47,210 according to 2011 census. It has an area of 532 km^{2}. It is one of the oldest towns of North Arcot District. Now the town is replaced by large-scale industries.

== Geography ==
It is located at 12°25′0″N 79°6′0″E at an elevation of 181 m above MSL.

== Kalasapakkam taluk ==
Kalasapakkam taluk has 45 village Panchayats. The names of 45 Village Panchayats in Kalasapakkam Panchayat Union are Venkatampalayam, Veeralur, Vanniyanur, Thenpallipattu, Thenmagadevamangalam, Siruvallur, Singaravadi, Cholavaram, Sengaputheri, Cheetambattu, Poondi, Pillur, Pattiyanthal, Pathiyavadi, Pazhankovil, Padakam, Mottur, Melvilvarayanallur, Melpalur, Melarani, Melchozhankuppam, Mattavettu, Ladavaram, Kovilmadhimangalam, Keezhpothirai, Kilpalur, Kilkuppam, Kitampalaiyam, Kettavarampalaiyam, Kappalur, Kanthapalaiyam, Kampattu, Kaalur, Kalasapakkam, Kadaladi, Gangavaram, Kenkalamakatevi, Ernamangalam, Elathur, Thevarayanpalaiyam, Arunagirimankalam, Aniyalai, Anaivadi, Alangaramangalam, and Aadhamangalam, vazhiyur.

== See also ==
- Kadaladi
- Karayambadi
