= Tiruvannamalai taluk =

Taluk in Tamil Nadu, India

Tiruvannamalai taluk is a taluk of Tiruvannamalai district of the Indian state of Tamil Nadu. The headquarters is the town of Tiruvannamalai.

== Demographics ==
According to the 2011 census, the taluk of Tiruvannamalai had a population of 579,583 with 291,523 males and 288,060 females. There were 988 women for every 1,000 men. The taluk had a literacy rate of 69.11%. Child population in the age group below 6 was 31,808 Males and 29,334 Females.
