= Cheyyar taluk =

Administrative division in Tamil Nadu, India

Coordinates: 12.6580°N 79.5424°E

Cheyyaru taluk is a taluk of Thiruvannamalai district of the Indian state of Tamil Nadu. The headquarters is the town of Cheyyar.

== Demographics ==
According to the 2011 census, the taluk of Cheyyar had a population of 342343 with 171769 males and 170574 females. There were 993 women for every 1000 men. The taluk had a literacy rate of 69.08. Child population in the age group below 6 was 16555 Males and 16052 Females.
