= Arani, Chennai =

Arani
- Suburb
- Located just outside Chennai Metropolitan area Arani (India)
- Coordinates: 13.3330°N 80.0849°E
- Country: India
- State: Tamil Nadu
- District: Thiruvallur
- Talukas: Ponneri Taluk

Government
  - Type: First Grade Town Panchayat
  - Body: Arani Town Panchayat

Area
  - Total: 5.89 km^{2} (2.27 sq mi)
- Elevation: 7 m (23 ft)

Population (2011)
  - Total: 12,833
  - Density: 2,180/km^{2} (5,640/sq mi)

Languages
  - Official: Tamil
- Time zone: UTC+5:30 (IST)
- PIN: 601101
- Telephone code: 044
- Vehicle registration: TN-18
- Planning agency: DTCP
- Parliamentary constituency: Thiruvallur
- Assembly constituency: Ponneri

Arani (Tamil: ஆரணி) is a residential area and suburb of Chennai, India, located on the banks of the Arani river.
