= Tiruvannamalai district =

Thiruvannamalai district
- District of Tamil Nadu
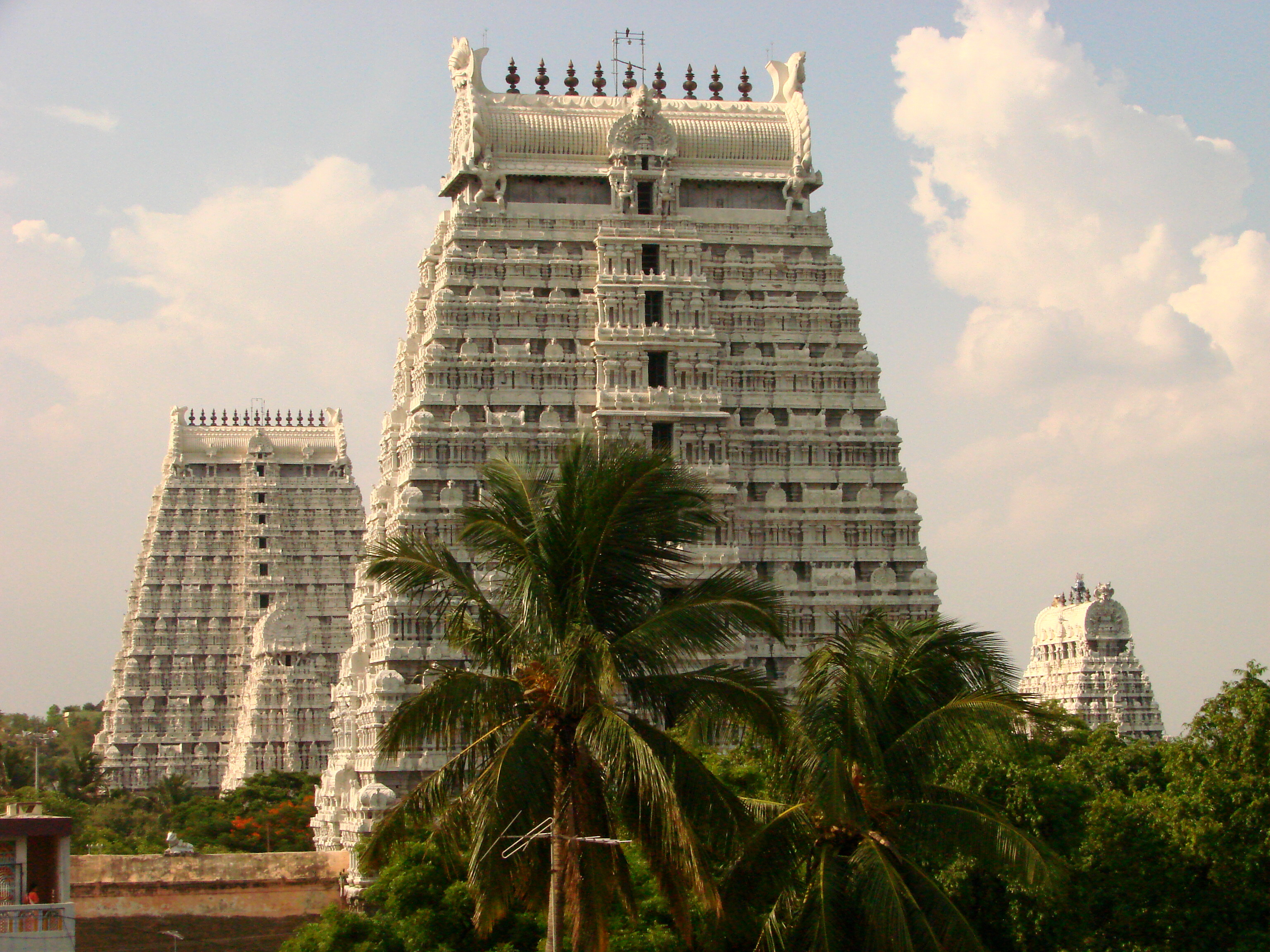
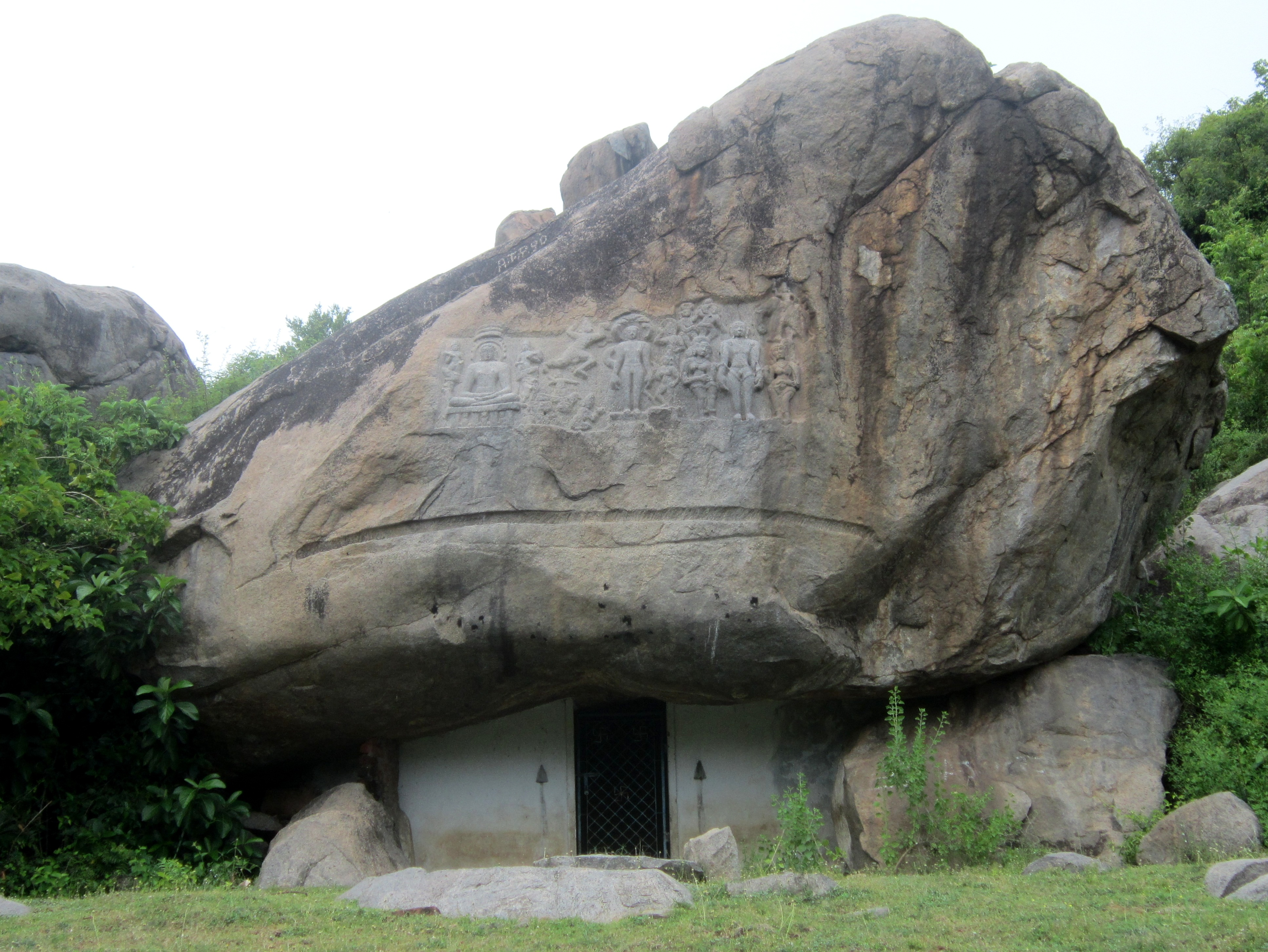
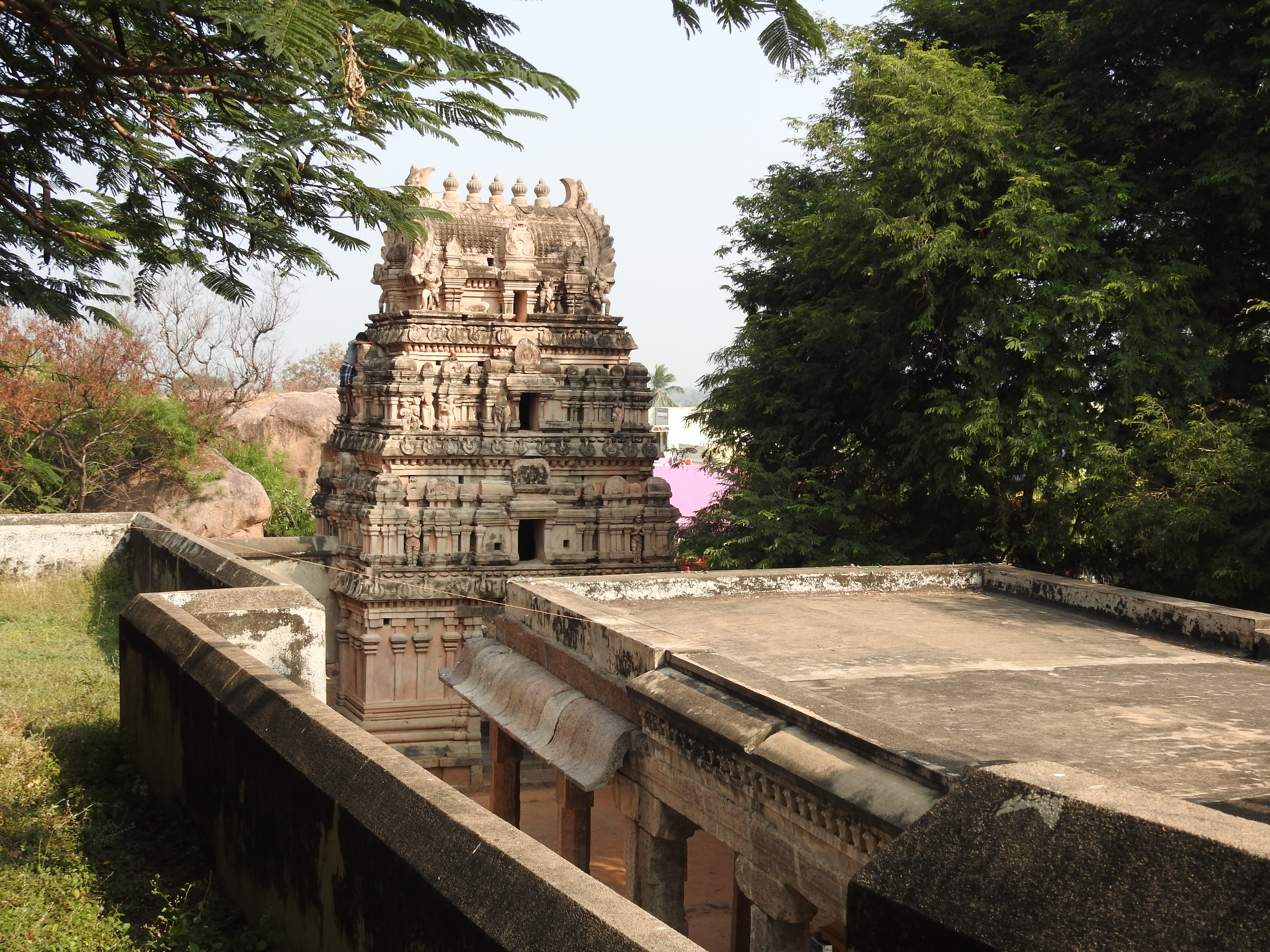
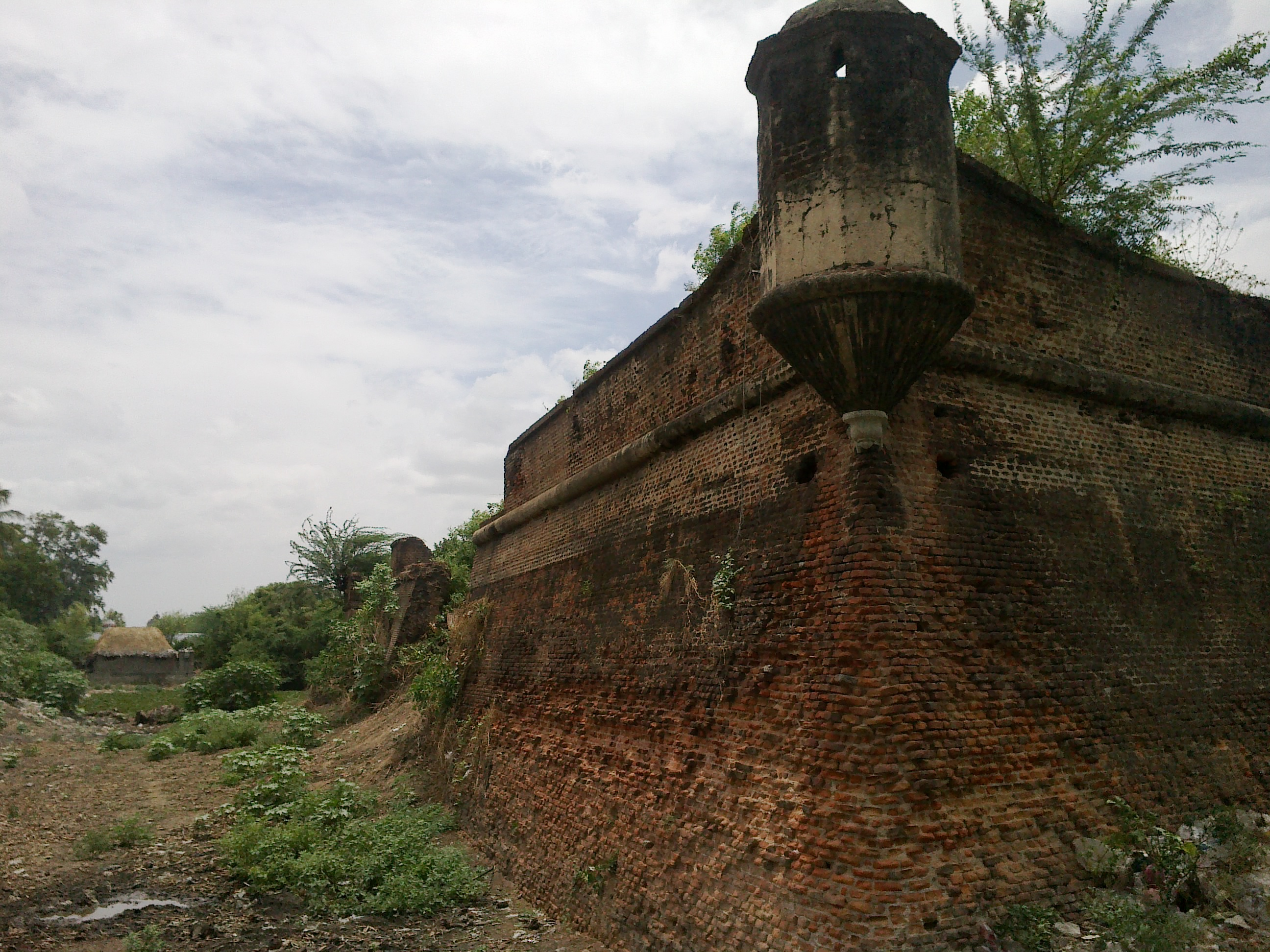
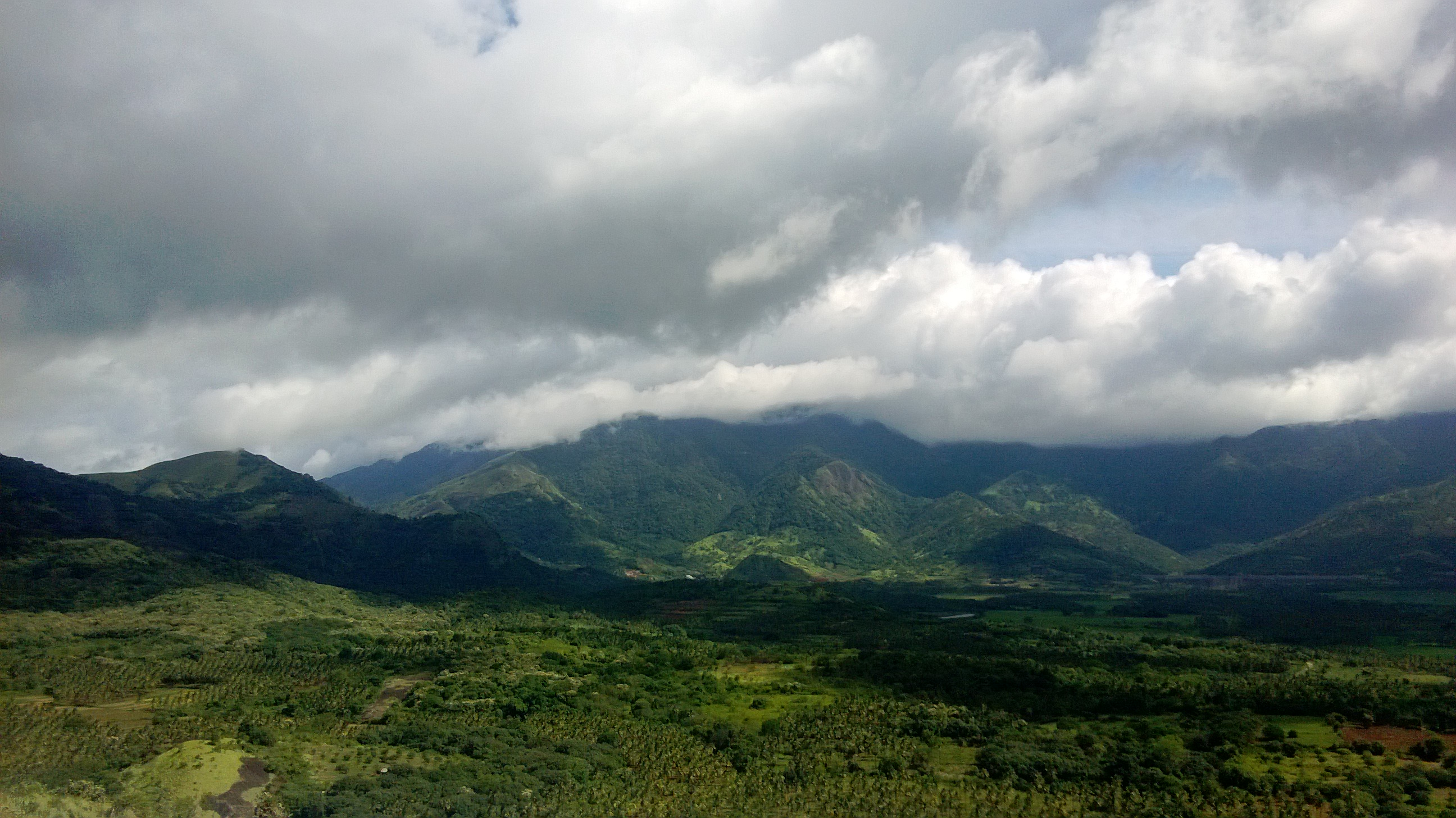
- Clockwise from top-left: Arulmigu Annamalaiyar Temple at Tiruvannamalai, Seeyamangalam Jain temple, Vandavasi & Aarani Fort, Eastern Ghats, Tirumalai Jain Temple

- Location in Tamil Nadu
- Tiruvannamalai district
- Coordinates: 12°25′N 79°7′E
- Country: India
- State: Tamil Nadu
- District: Tiruvannamalai
- City: Tiruvannamalai
- Municipalities: 1.Tiruvannamalai, 2.Aarani, 3.Cheyyar, 4.Vandavasi
- Total Urban areas: 22
- North Arcot: 26.1.1989
- Named for: King Sambhuvarayar, Thiruvannamalaiyar Temple
- Headquarters: Tiruvannamalai
- Talukas: Tiruvannamalai, Kilpennathur, Aarani, Cheyyar, Chengam, Polur, Vandavasi, Kalasapakkam, Chetpet, Thandarampattu, and Vembakkam

Government
  - Body: District collectrate
  - Collector: Vandana Garg IAS

Area
  - District of Tamil Nadu: 6,191 km^{2} (2,390 sq mi)
  - Rank: Second

Population (2011)
  - District of Tamil Nadu: 2,464,875
  - Rank: 4th rank in Tamil Nadu
  - Density: 654/km^{2} (1,690/sq mi)
  - Metro: 1,496,343
- Time zone: UTC+5:30 (IST)
- ISO 3166 code: ISO 3166-2:IN
- Vehicle registration: TN-25, TN-97
- Coastline: 0 kilometres (0 mi)
- Largest city: Tiruvannamalai
- Sex ratio: 1000:994 ♂/♀
- Literacy: 79.33%
- Legislature strength: 8
- Lok Sabha constituency: Aarani and Tiruvannamalai
- Vidhan Sabha constituency: Chengam, Tiruvannamalai, Kilpennathur, Kalasapakkam, Polur, Arni, Cheyyar and Vandavasi
- Precipitation: 5,646 millimetres (222.3 in)
- Website: tiruvannamalai.nic.in

Thiruvannamalai district (previously known as Central Arcot, Tiruvannamalai Sambhuvarayar district) is one of the 38 districts in the south Indian state of Tamil Nadu. It is the second largest district in Tamil Nadu by area, after Dindigul District. It was formed in 1989 through the bifurcation of North Arcot into the Tiruvannamalai Sambuvarayar and Vellore Ambedkar districts. The city of Tiruvannamalai is the district headquarters.

The district is divided into 12 Taluks—Arani, Chengam, Tiruvannamalai, Polur, Thandarampattu, Vandavasi, Kalasapakkam, Chetpet, Kilpennathur, Jamunamarathoor, Cheyyar and Vembakkam. As of 2011, the district had a population of 2,464,875 with a sex-ratio of 994 females for every 1,000 males.

== History ==
Tiruvannamalai is one of the most venerated places in Tamil Nadu. In ancient times, the term "Annamalai" meant an inaccessible mountain. The word "Thiru" was prefixed to signify its greatness, and coupled with the two terms, it was called Thiruvannamalai. Thiru means 'holy' or 'sacred' and is traditionally used in front of names in all parts of Tamil Nadu like Thiruneermalai (Lord Ranganatha), Thirunageswaram (Lord Vishnu and Lord Shiva), Thirumayam (Lord Vishnu and Lord Shiva), Thirumayilai (Lord Adikeshava Perumal and Lord Kapali Eshwaran), Tiruvannamalai (Lord Shiva), Thiruchendur (Lord Muruga), Tiruchirappalli (Rockfort Lord Thaiyumanavar and Lord Sriranganathar), Thiruttani (Lord Muruga), Tiruchengode (Lord Shiva), Thiruchitrambalam (Lord Shiva), Thirumanancheri (Lord Shiva), Thirunallar (Lord Shani Eshwaran), Thiruporur (Lord Muruga), Thirukkadaiyur (Lord Shiva), Tirukalukundram (Lord Vedagiriswarar temple), Thirukarugavur (Lord Garbharakshambigai temple), Tirunelveli, Tiruppur, Tiruvallur and many more.

The temple town of Tiruvannamalai is one of the most ancient heritage sites of India and is a centre of the Saiva religion. The Arunachala hill and its environs have been held in great regard by the Tamils for centuries. The temple is grand in conception and architecture and is rich in tradition, history and festivals. The main Deepam festival attracts devotees from far and wide throughout South India. It has historic places besides Tiruvannamalai, Polur, Arani, Vandavasi, Devikapuram connected to East India and French companies. Arani and Vandavasi had important places in the history of pre-independence. In the late Chola period the district was ruled by the Cholan of Sambuvarayar having Padavedu near Arani as HQ.

After independence Tiruvannamalai was under North Arcot District. The civil district of North Arcot was divided into Vellore District and Tiruvannamalai District in October 1989. P. Kolappan was the first Collector of Tiruvannamalai District. On the whole Tiruvannamalai is traditionally rich in Historic and spiritual values but lacks in industrial growth.

== Geography ==
The district shares borders with Kanchipuram and Chengalpattu districts in the east, Villupuram and Kallakurichi districts in the south, Krishnagiri and Dharmapuri districts in the west, and Vellore, Ranipet and Tirupattur districts in the north.

=== Climate ===
The average annual rainfall of the study area is 1350 mm, out of which 80 percent is received during the monsoon. The soils of the study area have an ustic moisture regime and hyperthermic temperature regime. Tiruvannamalai District comes under the Eastern Ghats (TN uplands) and Deccan plateau, hot semiarid region with red loamy soil with cropping period of 90 to 150 days. Excepting hills, the district falls in the North Eastern agro climatic zone of Tamil Nadu.

== Demographics ==
Historical population
Year	Pop.	±% p.a.
1901	754,287	—
1911	875,117	+1.50%
1921	942,378	+0.74%
1931	1,070,320	+1.28%
1941	1,173,298	+0.92%
1951	1,223,154	+0.42%
1961	1,328,359	+0.83%
1971	1,524,349	+1.39%
1981	1,785,798	+1.60%
1991	2,042,979	+1.35%
2001	2,186,125	+0.68%
2011	2,464,875	+1.21%

According to 2011 census, Tiruvannamalai District had a population of 2,464,875 with a sex-ratio of 994 females for every 1,000 males, much above the national average of 929. A total of 272,569 were under the age of six, constituting 141,205 males and 131,364 females. Scheduled Castes and Scheduled Tribes accounted for 22.94% and 3.69% of the population respectively. The average literacy of the district was 66.%, compared to the national average of 72.99%. The district had a total of 588,836 households. There were a total of 1,238,177 workers, comprising 265,183 cultivators, 351,310 main agricultural labourers, 37,020 in house hold industries, 316,559 other workers, 268,105 marginal workers, 27,458 marginal cultivators, 173,753 marginal agricultural labourers, 9,700 marginal workers in household industries and 57,194 other marginal workers.

Religions in Tiruvannamalai district (2011)
Religion	Percent
Hinduism	93.08%
Islam	3.72%
Christianity	2.72%
Other or not stated	0.48%

Hindus are the major religion. The Arunachalesvara Temple in Tiruvannamalai is particularly famous. Muslims live in urban areas while Christians are mostly rural.

Languages of Tiruvannamalai district (2011)
1. Tamil (94.3%)
2. Urdu (2.66%)
3. Telugu (2.36%)
4. Others (0.67%)

At the time of the 2011 census, 94.31% of the population spoke Tamil, 2.66% Urdu and 2.36% Telugu as their first language.

== Politics ==
District	No.	Constituency	Name	Party	Alliance	Remarks
Tiruvannamalai	62	Chengam (SC)	T. S. Velu	AIADMK	NDA	Opposed TVK
Tiruvannamalai	63	Tiruvannamalai	E. V. Velu	DMK	SPA	
Tiruvannamalai	64	Kilpennathur	S. Ramachandran	AIADMK	NDA	Opposed TVK
Tiruvannamalai	65	Kalasapakkam	Agri S. S. Krishnamurthy	AIADMK	NDA	Opposed TVK
Tiruvannamalai	66	Polur	R. Abhishek	TVK	TVK+	
Tiruvannamalai	67	Arani	L. Jaya Sudha	AIADMK	NDA	Opposed TVK
Tiruvannamalai	68	Cheyyar	Mukkur N. Subramanian	AIADMK	NDA	Opposed TVK
Tiruvannamalai	69	Vandavasi (SC)	S. Ambethkumar	DMK	SPA	

== Administration ==
Tiruvannamalai District has an area of 6,191 km^{2}. It is bounded on the north by Vellore District and Tirupattur District, on the east by Kanchipuram District, on the south by Villupuram District, and on the west by Dharmapuri and Krishnagiri districts. Tiruvannamalai District is divided into 3 sub districts (Arani, Tiruvannamalai and Cheyyar), twelve taluks, 27 blocks and 1,061 villages covering an area of 631,205 ha.

=== Taluks ===
The district is composed of Talukas namely Tiruvannamalai Urban, Tiruvannamalai Rural, Arani, Cheyyar, Chengam, Javvadhumalai, Polur, Vandavasi, Kalasapakkam, Chettupattu Thandarampattu, and Vembakkam

The twelve taluks of Tiruvannamalai are listed below:

	Taluk	Headquarters	Area	Revenue villages	Population (2011)	Pop. density
1	Tiruvannamalai-Urban	Tiruvannamalai	102 km^{2}	135	409,826	3,382 /km^{2}
2	Tiruvannamalai-Rural	Kil Pennathur	102 km^{2}	77	169,759	3,382 /km^{2}
3	Thandarampattu	Thandarampattu	691 km^{2}	63	179,559	593 /km^{2}
4	Chengam	Chengam	510 km^{2}	121	280,581	639 /km^{2}
5	Arani	Arani	327 km^{2}	55	294,976	673 /km^{2}
6	Polur	Polur	509 km^{2}	111	251,685	645 /km^{2}
7	Kalasapakkam	Kalasapakkam	532 km^{2}	52	140,301	618 /km^{2}
8	Javvadhumalai	Jamunamarathoor	645 km^{2}	42	47,271	291 /km^{2}
9	Cheyyar	Tiruvethipuram	344 km^{2}	131	218,188	618 /km^{2}
10	Vandavasi	Vandavasi	645 km^{2}	161	275,079	652 /km^{2}
11	Chettupattu	Chettupattu	493 km^{2}	76	146,806	588 /km^{2}
12	Vembakkam	Vembakkam	310 km^{2}	91	124,188	581 /km^{2}

=== Municipal corporation ===
- Tiruvannamalai

=== Municipalities ===
- Arani
- Cheyyar (officially, Tiruvethipuram)
- Vandavasi
- Chengam
- Polur

=== Town panchayats ===
- Chetpet
- Kalambur
- Kannamangalam
- Kilpennathur
- Vettavalam
- Desur
- Peranamallur
- Pudupalayam

=== Important cities ===
Cities having a population of one lakh and above as per 2011 Census:

	City	Population		City	Population
1	Tiruvannamalai	3,80,543	9	Gandhinagar-Lakshmipuram	45,571
2	Arani	1,43,783	10	Kalambur	31,751
3	Vandavasi	1,16,452	11	Vettavalam	28,059
4	Polur	1,01,420	12	Pudupalayam	25,374
5	Tiruvethipuram	87,901	13	Thyagi Annamalai Nagar	24,329
6	Chengam	74,901	14	Peranamallur	22,619
7	Chettupattu	59,580	15	Adamangalam-Pudur	21,750
8	Kalasapakkam	46,910	16	Kizh-Pennathur	21,308

=== Villages ===
- Devanambattu
- Hasanamapet
- Konaiyur
- Kurumbhur
- Mullandrum
- Nambedu
- Nochimalai
- Perungattur
- Vadugappattu
- Veerambakkam

== Economy ==
In the District Arani and Tiruvannamalai regions are the highest revenue-generating regions.

In 2006 the Ministry of Panchayati Raj named Tiruvannamalai one of the country's 250 most backward districts (out of a total of 640). It is one of the six districts in Tamil Nadu currently receiving funds from the Backward Regions Grant Fund Programme (BRGF).

== Agriculture ==
Tiruvannamalai District is known for its two major businesses, agriculture and silk saree weaving. Rice cultivation and processing is one of the biggest businesses in this district. 112013 hectares of paddy cultivation is irrigated by 1965 lakes and 18 reservoirs and small dams. It has 18 regulated markets through which the farmers sell their agri products directly to the government. Through these regulated markets, 271411 metric tonnes of paddy harvested in 2007. There are many rice mills to process paddy found throughout the district. The modern rice mill near Cheyyar is the biggest government owned mill and Arani has around 278 rice mills. Kalambur is also has around 20 rice mills and known for variety of rice called Kalambur Ponni rice. Kalambur Ponni rice is famous across the state and being shipped to places like Chennai, Coimbatore, Vellore, and the like.

== Silk weaving ==
The district has a large populace of weavers who are specialize in making silk sarees. Hand looms are often engaged for weaving, although recently some have turned to mechanized looms. Arani taluk contributes a high percent of silk weaving. Arani is the most important revenue earning town in the district. Though the town is not popular off the state, the bulk of India's silk apparel is produced by the people of Arani.

== Industrialization ==
The district started to industrialize following the establishment of the industrial complex near Cheyyar by the State Industries Promotion Corporation of Tamil Nadu (SIPCOT). This is evidenced by the recent announcements of a 250-acre (1.0 km^{2}) hi-tech Special Economic Zone for automative components, a 300-acre (1.2 km^{2}) electronics hardware park and the commitment from the Taiwanese Shoe Company to set up its unit. In November 2009 the Tamil Nadu cabinet approved the Mahindara and Mahindra's Rs 1800 core automobile project in 450 acres. This unit will produce tractors, SUVs and commercial vehicles and auto parts. Aluminum die cast unit by Ashley Alteams, a joint venture by Ashok Leyland and Finland-based Alteams Oy started its production in January 2010. This high pressure die cast will manufacture automobile and telecommunication components with an initial capacity of 7000 tons per year.

One of the largest sugar mills in the country, Cheyyar co-operative sugars, is situated near Cheyyar.

== Factories ==
Since Tiruvannamalai District has its capital at Tiruvannamalai City, there are many factories around Tiruvannamalai. Scent factories are large in number due to the high production of flowers around Tiruvannamalai. These include Hindusthan house hold factories, Sarala birla factory of aroma oil, and Parthiban cottages aroma oil factory.

The Tamil Nadu government is planning for a SIPCOT at naidumangalam and kilpennathur, both near Tiruvannamalai.

Arani has factories related to rice and silk with in the town and in the Taluk area. There are a few other mills near Arani, such as Lakshmi Saraswathi Cotton mills Arni Pvt Ltd and some engineering industry.

== Arahanthgiri Jain Math ==
Arahanthgiri Jain Math is a Jain math that was established at this ancient Jain site on 8 February 1998, at Thirumalai, Near Arani. The complex includes three Jain caves, four Jain temples and a 16-meter-high sculpture of Neminatha thought to date from the 12th century that is the tallest Jain idol in Tamil Nadu.

== See also ==
- List of districts of Tamil Nadu
- Akkur, Tiruvannamalai
