= Arni Fort bus terminus =

Arani Fort Bus Terminus Arani New Bus stand Terminus
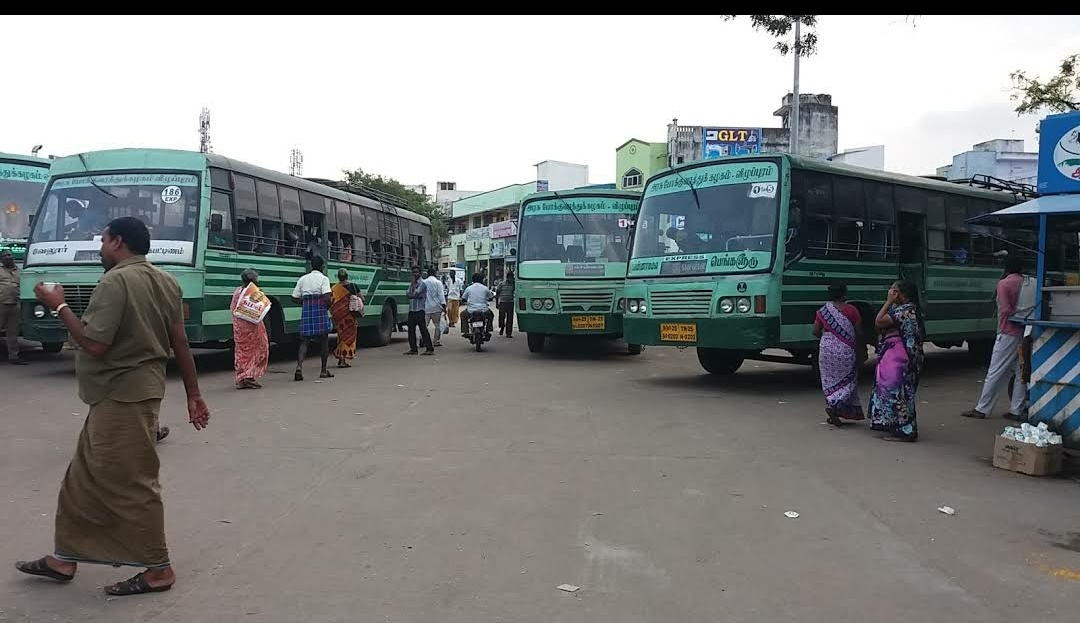
- Arani Fort Bus station

General information
- Location: Chennai - Tiruvannamalai - Salem National Highway, Arani, Tiruvannamalai district, 632101
- Coordinates: 12.6705923°N 79.2844952°E
- System: Central Bus Terminus
- Owner: Arni Municipality
- Platforms: 5 (200 buses)
- Tracks: yes
- Connections: Arani Market

Construction
- Parking: yes
- Cycle facilities: yes
- Accessible: yes

Other information
- Fare zone: Tamilnadu Transport corporation - Tiruvannamalai Region

History
- Opened: 2002
- Rebuilt: no

Services
Towards Tiruvannamalai, Villupuram and Vandavasi
Location

Arani Fort bus station, is the city of Arni's main bus station. Arni is the second largest town in Tiruvannamalai district after Tiruvannamalai city. It is in the central part of Arni town and is near the Arni Fort, hence its name.

== Transport ==
- Tiruvannamalai, Villupuram, Vandavasi, Polur, salem, Coimbatore, Tirupur, Erode, Pondicherry, Tindivanam, Devikapuram, Chettupattu, Tanjavur, Pudukottai, Trichy, Gingee, Uthiramerur, Chengam, Thurinjikuppam, Jamunamarathur, and Bangalore are served by TNSTC and SETC buses.
