= Arani Revenue Division =

Arani Revenue Division Arani Silk City
- Revenue Division
- Country: India
- State: Tamilnadu
- District: Tiruvannamalai
- Revenue Head Quarter: Arani
- Sub District: Arani
- Circles: 1.Kalasapakkam taluk, 2.Chettupattu taluk 3.Polur taluk, 4.Jamunamarathoor taluk, 5.Arani taluk
- Established: March 2016

Government
  - Type: Revenue Division
  - Body: Arani Revenue Division
  - District Collector: Mr. K. Tharpgaraj, IAS
  - Department of Revenue and Disaster Management: Tmt.P. Aumudha, IAS, Additional Chief Secretary to Government

Area
  - Total: 13.64 km^{2} (5.27 sq mi)
- Elevation: 171 m (561 ft)

Population (2011)
  - Total: 1,011,834
- Demonym: Aranikaran

Language
  - Official Language: Tamil
- Time zone: UTC+5:30 (இசீநே)
- Postal Code: 632301, 632316
- Telephone Code: 04173
- Vehicle registration: TN 97

Arani Revenue Division is one of three revenue circle divisions in Tiruvannamalai district of Tamil Nadu, India. It comprises the taluks of Arani, Polur, Kalasapakkam and Jamunamarattur .

Tiruvannamalai district is a newly developed Arani Revenue Division . The Revenue Division has been restructured and the newly formed Revenue Code has been restructured for the revenue management facility. The revenue quota was funded by the efforts of the Minister of Hindu Religious Affairs, Mr.Sevoor Ramachandran. Edapadi c. Palanisamy. Opened in April 2016 . Under this Arani Revenue Code, Arani taluk, Polur taluk, Kalasapakkam taluk, Chettupattu taluk, Jamunamathur taluk The talukas are located. It is also the highest income earner in the Tiruvannamalai district.
