= Aazhi Senthil Nathan =

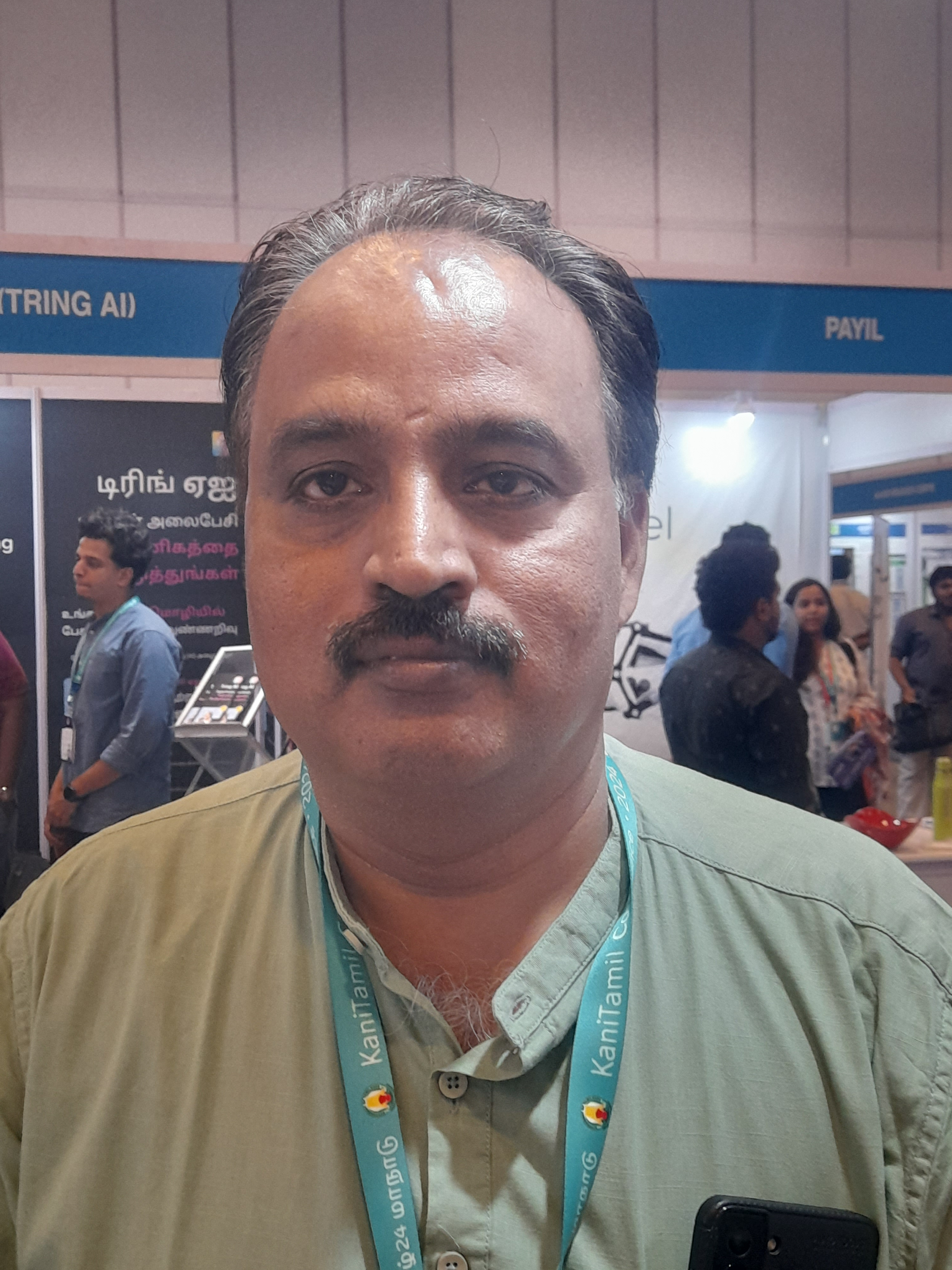
- At the KaniThamizh International Conference held in Chennai (February 2024)
- Born: Senthil Nathan; Devikapuram, Tiruvannamalai district, Tamil Nadu, India
- Education: University of Madras, Arignar Anna Government Arts College, Cheyyar
- Occupations: Writer, journalist, publisher
- Writing career
- Notable work: 1974 – Maanila Suyatchi (1974 – State Autonomy), Mozhi Engal Uyirukku Ner (Language is Equal to Our Life)

Aazhi Senthil Nathan is a multi-faceted personality from Tamil Nadu, India. He was known for his work as a writer, columnist, media personality, translator and publisher. He is also a prominent linguistic equality activist and social activist.

== Birth and career ==
Aazhi Senthil Nathan was born in Devikapuram, near Arani, in the present-day Tiruvannamalai district. He completed his undergraduate studies in physics at the Arignar Anna Government Arts College in Cheyyar, followed by a master's degree in journalism from the University of Madras, Chennai.

After completing his education, he worked as a journalist and translator for various publications, including India Today, as well as for several information technology companies. Later, he began specializing in Tamil language translation and localization for IT-related projects, a field in which he remains actively involved.

== Publishing career ==
In 2007, he established Aazhi Publishers (Aazhi Pathippagam) and has since published over a hundred books.

- 1974: மாநில சுயாட்சி (State Autonomy): A research-oriented book documenting the history of state autonomy and the Rajamannar Committee's recommendations.
- மொழி எங்கள் உயிருக்கு நேர் (Language is Peer to Our Life): A collection of essays regarding language rights and the history of language struggles in Tamil Nadu.
- பச்சைத் துரோகம் (Green Treachery): A work discussing environmental and social issues.
- நீங்கள் ஏன் கமால் ஹசன் இல்லை (Why are you not Kamal Haasan?): A book exploring socio-political themes through a cultural lens.
- டிராகன்: புதிய வல்லரசு சீனா (Dragon: The New Superpower China): An analysis of China's global rise.
