= Thurinjikuppam =

- Punjayat union
- Location within Tamil Nadu Location within India
- Coordinates: 12.6087837°N 79.1225444°E
- Country: India
- State: Tamilnadu
- District: Tiruvannamalai
- Region: Thondai Region
- Revenue Division: Arani
- State Assembly: Polur
- Lok sabha constituency: Arani
- Founder: Tamilnadu Government

Government
  - Type: Punjayat union
  - Body: Thurinjikuppam Punjayat union
  - Regional Transport: Arani
  - Lok sabha member: Mr.M.k.vishnu Prasad
  - State Assembly member: Mr.Sekaran
  - District Collector: Mr.Kandasamy IAS
  - President: not assigned

Area
  - Total: 12 km^{2} (4.6 sq mi)
  - Rank: 211 Metre
- Elevation: 7.2 m (24 ft)

Population (2011)
  - Total: 2,993
  - Density: 250/km^{2} (650/sq mi)

Language
  - Official Language: Tamil
- Time zone: UTC+5:30
- Postal code: 606907
- Vehicle registration: TN 97
- Website: Thurinjikuppam

Thurinjikuppam Thiruvannamalai District, Tamil Nadu, India, is located in the Polur Taluk, which belongs to the Arani Revenue Division. The famous Adiparasakthi Amman Temple is located here.

== Population ==
According to the 2011 census of India, the total population is 2993. Of these, 1343 are women and 1404 are men. Thurinjikuppam Village, with a population of 2993, is the 36th most populous village in the Polur Taluk, which is the India's Tamil Nadu Thiruvannamalai District Polur The circle is located in the Polur circle. The total geographical area of Thurinjikuppam village is 7 km2, which is the 26th largest village in the sub-district. The population density of the village is 417 persons per km2. This panchayat is also included in the Polur assembly constituency & Arani Lok sabha constituency.

== Road & transport facilities ==
Thurinjikuppam village is set up as a network of facilities.

- Periyeri - Sitteri - Thurinjikuppam - kelur - vadamathimangalam Road
- Thurinjikuppam - vilankuppam - munivantangal Road
- Thurinjikuppam - Athuvambadi - kattippoondi - Polur road
- There is a city bus service from Arani (Track Number: 6A LSS), via: Kelur, Vadamathimangalam Railway Station, and Kalambur.
- There are regular bus services from Avalurpet, Devikapuram, Polur, Kunnathoor and Kattipoondi (City Number: P2 LSS).
