= Malaiyur =

Mazhaiyur Mazhaiyur
- village
- Nickname: Raincity
- Location in Tamil Nadu, India Mazhaiyur (India)
- Coordinates: 12°30′0″N 79°29′0″E
- Country: India
- State: Tamil Nadu
- District: Tiruvannamalai

Languages
  - Official: Tamil
- Time zone: UTC+5:30 (IST)

Mazhaiyur, also spelt Mazhaiyur, is a small town in Tiruvannamalai district of Tamil Nadu, India. Mazhaiyur is 110 km (68 mi) south-west of Chennai. Located on Chetpet-Vandavasi Road, the town is midway between Chetpet and Vandavasi.
