= Kunnathur, Tiruvannamalai =

Kunnathur
- village
- Location in Tamil Nadu, India Kunnathur (India)
- Coordinates: 12.534063°N 79.136956°E
- Country: India
- State: Tamil Nadu
- District: Tiruvannamalai

Languages
  - Official: Tamil
- PIN: 632314

Kunnathur is a village in Arani Taluk in Tiruvannamalai District of Tamil Nadu State, India. It lies on the border between Tiruvannamalai District and Vellore District (which lies to the West) and is located 64 km north of the District Headquarters in Tiruvannamalai, 8 km from Arani, and 139 km from the state capital Chennai.

Kunnathur is surrounded by number of other small villages: Kurumanthangal (1.5 km), Kilnagar (3 km), Ariyapadi (3 km), Sedarampattu (4 km), Onnupuram (3 km), Puthuppalayam (2 km), Sevoor (4 km) and Arani Taluk to the East, Kaniyambadi Taluk to the West, Timiri Taluk to the North, and Polur Taluk to the South. Polur, Arcot, Vellore, and Cheyyar are the nearest large towns to Kunnathur.

Kunnathur's Postal Head Office is located in Kunnathur Arni.

Kunnathur is also home to the Dhrowbathal Amman Temple and the Eswaran Temple. The famous Murugan Hindu Temple is located in Kundu Malai, Kunnathur.
