= Ramanayanikuppam =

- village
- Location in Tamil Nadu, India Ramanayanikuppam (India)
- Coordinates: 12.782778°N 78.859722°E
- Country: India
- State: Tamil Nadu

Languages
  - Official: Tamil
- Time zone: UTC+5:30 (IST)

Ramanayanikuppam is a village panchayat of 27 km² area in a panchayat union (Vellore Taluk, Vellore district, Tamil Nadu, India. It has a population of 5000 people. Under its governance are three villages – Asanambut, Kallaraparai, and Kuruvankottai. Its main rain-fed lake is about 9.5 acres (38,000 m^{2}). This village is in the foothills of the Javadi Hills and is very close to the Palar river.
