= Periyanayagi Amman Temple =

Periyanayagi Amman Temple is a historic Hindu temple dedicated to Goddess Parvati, worshipped here as Periyanayagi Amman (also known as Brihannayaki or Brahadambal), located in the centre of Devikapuram, in the Tiruvannamalai district of Tamil Nadu, India. The temple lies approximately 17 km east of Polur and about 51 km north-east of Tiruvannamalai. It is one of the largest temples in the district and is regarded as the second-largest temple complex after the Arunachaleswarar Temple in Tiruvannamalai. The temple is situated at the foothills of the Kanagagiri hill, atop which stands the Kanagagiriswarar Temple, forming an important sacred twin-shrine complex in Devikapuram. The village itself is historically associated with ancient Saivite and Shakta traditions.

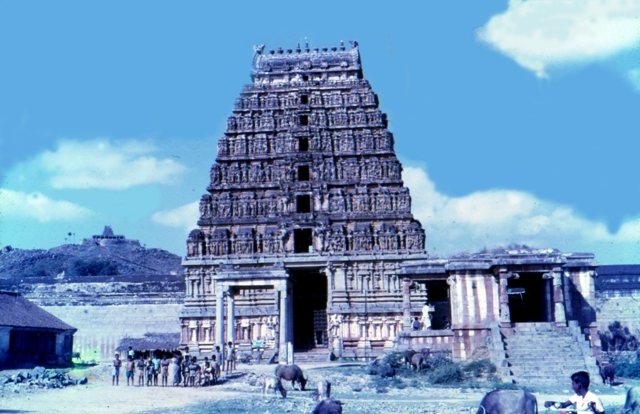
Periyanayagi Amman Temple, Devikapuram

== History ==
The origins of the temple are traditionally traced to the Chola dynasty, with the present stone structure believed to have been built during the 11th century CE. The temple underwent major expansion and renovation during the rule of the Vijayanagara Empire in the 14th and 15th centuries, which contributed significantly to its present architectural form. Several inscriptions found on the temple walls record land grants, donations, and festival endowments made by Chola, Vijayanagara, and Nayak rulers. The temple's last major Kumbabhishekam (consecration ceremony) took place in 2003, following an earlier one in 1889.

== Architecture ==
The temple is an important example of Dravidian architecture with strong Vijayanagara architectural influences. The temple complex covers approximately 3 acres and is enclosed by massive granite walls measuring around 30 feet in height. The complex stretches roughly 475 feet east-west and 450 feet north-south.

The eastern entrance is marked by a seven-tiered Rajagopuram rising about 150 feet, richly decorated with stucco sculptures and mythological imagery. The temple has three main entrances, though the northern and southern gateways are generally closed for devotees.

One of the temple's notable features is its 36-pillared mandapa, containing around 432 sculptural depictions of episodes from the Puranas, including stories of Shiva, Vishnu, and Devi. The Kalyana Mandapa is designed in the form of a chariot pulled by stone horses, showcasing intricate craftsmanship from the Vijayanagara period.

The temple contains shrines for Ganesha, Murugan, Nataraja, Somaskanda, and Kasi Viswanathar.

== Deity ==
The presiding deity, Periyanayagi Amman, is represented in a standing posture with pasa (noose) and ankusha (goad) in her upper hands, while the lower hands display abhaya (protection) and varada (boon-giving) mudras. The goddess is regarded as a powerful manifestation of the Divine Mother and is worshipped for blessings related to marriage, childbirth, health, and prosperity.

== Sacred tanks ==
The temple has several sacred water bodies (theerthams), including:

- Brahma Theertham – located within the temple premises
- Agni Theertham – located to the south-east of the temple
- Navagraha Theertham (Periyappan Kulam) – located near the foothill
- Other associated tanks including Devaradiyar Theertham and Seyyan Theertham

== Festivals ==
The temple celebrates several annual festivals, the most prominent being:

- Panguni Uthiram – linked with the divine marriage festival of Shiva and Parvati
- Navaratri – dedicated to the worship of the Goddess in her various forms
- Aadi festival
- Chitra Pournami

During major festivals, the deity is taken in procession through Devikapuram village on decorated vahanams, attracting large numbers of devotees.

== Religious, significance, and legends ==
Local legends associate Devikapuram with Devaki, the mother of Krishna, and some traditions state that the village was once known as Devakipuram. Another tradition links the temple to Brahma, who is believed to have consecrated the Goddess here.

The temple is considered an important Shakti shrine in northern Tamil Nadu and is closely linked ritually with the hilltop Kanagagiriswarar Temple.
