= Vainu Bappu =

Indian astronomer (1927–1982)

A photograph of M.K.V. Bappu.

Manali Kallat Vainu Bappu (10 August 1927 – 19 August 1982) was an Indian astronomer and president of the International Astronomical Union. Bappu helped to establish several astronomical institutions in India, including the Vainu Bappu Observatory which is named after him, and he also contributed to the establishment of the modern Indian Institute of Astrophysics. In 1957, he discovered the Wilson–Bappu effect jointly with American astronomer Olin Chaddock Wilson.

On 2 July 1949, when Bappu was taking pictures of the night sky, he spotted a bright moving object which he had rightfully understood to be a comet. When he turned to his professor, Bart Bok, and colleague Gordon Newkirk, they confirmed the discovery. They calculated the orbit of the comet which revealed that the comet would reappear only after 60,000 years.

The International Astronomical Union officially named the comet as the Bappu-Bok-Newkirk comet (C/1949N1). Bappu also received the Donohoe Comet Medal of the Astronomical Society of the Pacific.

This is the only comet with an Indian name.

== Early life ==
Vainu Bappu was born on 10 August 1927, in Chennai, as the only child of Manali Kukuzhi Bappu and Kallat Sunanna bappu. His family originally hails from Thalassery in Kerala. His grandfather Kakkuzhi Kunji Bappu Gurukkal whose family was an aristocratic brahmin in Tellichery was a Sanskrit poet and scholar and father was an astronomer at the Nizamiah Observatory in Telangana. He attended the Harvard Graduate School of Astronomy for his PhD after obtaining postgraduate degree from the Madras University.

== Discoveries ==
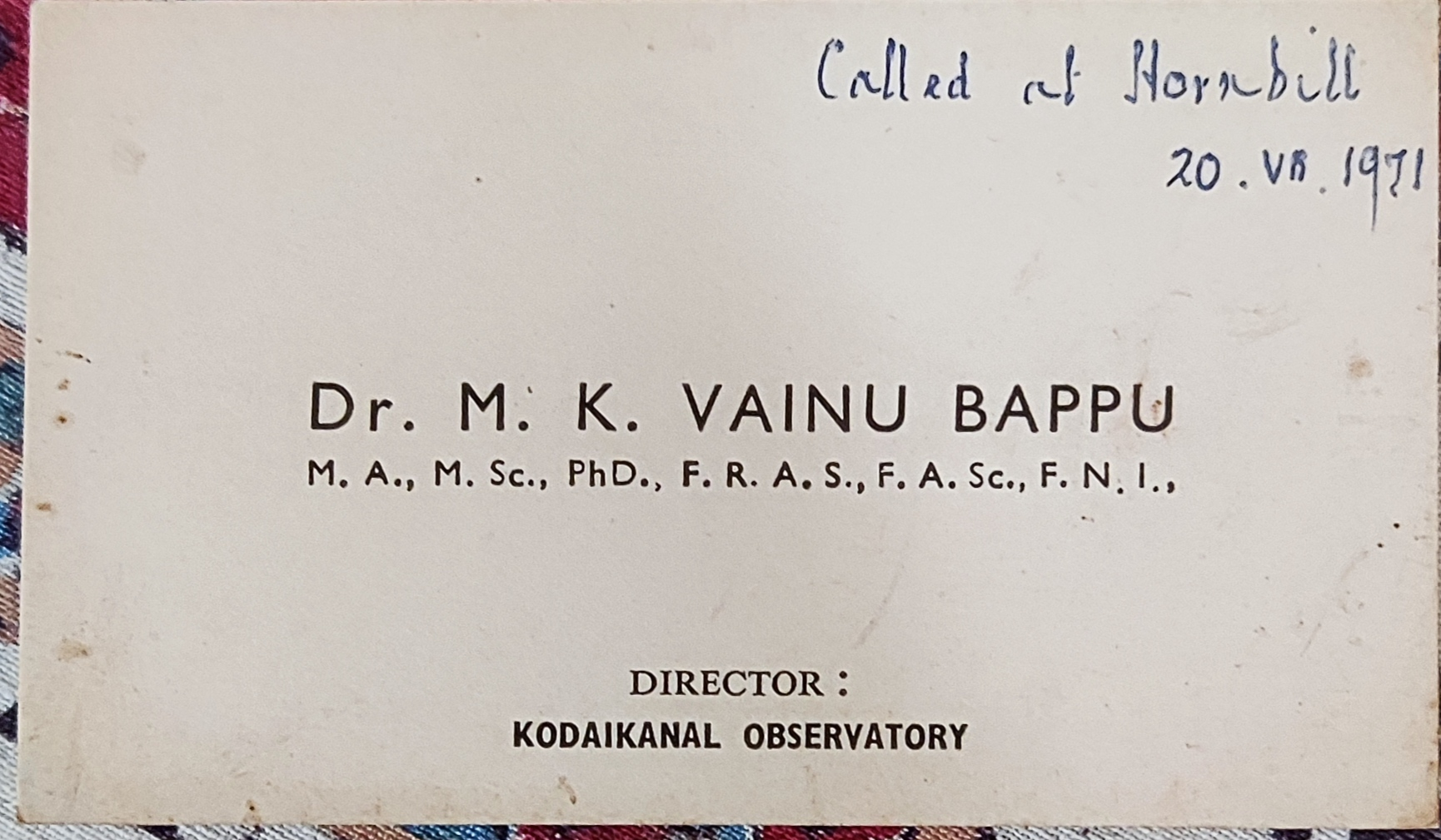
Visiting card

Bappu, along with two of his colleagues, discovered the 'Bappu-Bok-Newkirk' comet. He was awarded the Donhoe Comet-Medal by the Astronomical Society of the Pacific in 1949.

In a paper published in 1957, American astronomer Olin Chaddock Wilson and Bappu had described what would later be known as the Wilson–Bappu effect. The effect as described by L.V. Kuhi is: 'The width of the Ca II emission in normal, nonvariable, G, K, and M stars is correlated with the visual absolute magnitude in the sense that the brighter the star the wider the emission.' The paper opened up the field of stellar chromospheres for research.

== Vainu Bappu Observatory ==
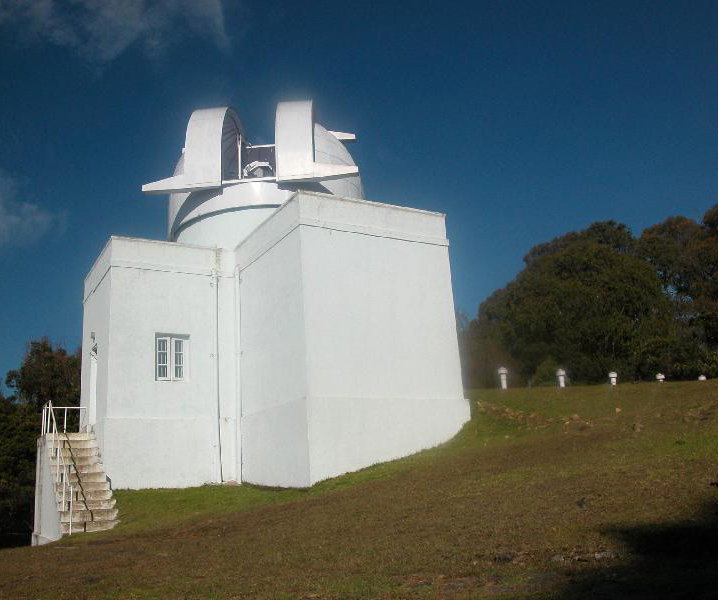
Solar Tunnel Telescope at the Kodaikanal Solar Observatory. Bappu served as head of the observatory in 1960.

On his return to India, Bappu was appointed to head a team of astronomers to build an observatory at Nainital. His efforts of building an indigenous large optical telescope and a research observatory led to the founding of the optical observatory of Kavalur and its large telescope. The Vainu Bappu Observatory is one of the main observatories of the Indian Institute of Astrophysics, also initiated in its modern avatar by Bappu in 1971. Later, a number of discoveries were made from the Vainu Bappu Observatory.

== Career overview ==
Post	Institution
Honorary Foreign Fellow	Belgium Academy of Sciences
Honorary Member	American Astronomical Society
Vice-President	International Astronomical Union (1967–73)
President	International Astronomical Union (1979)

== See also ==
- Cosmic distance ladder
