= Mounasamy Mutt, Kumbakonam =

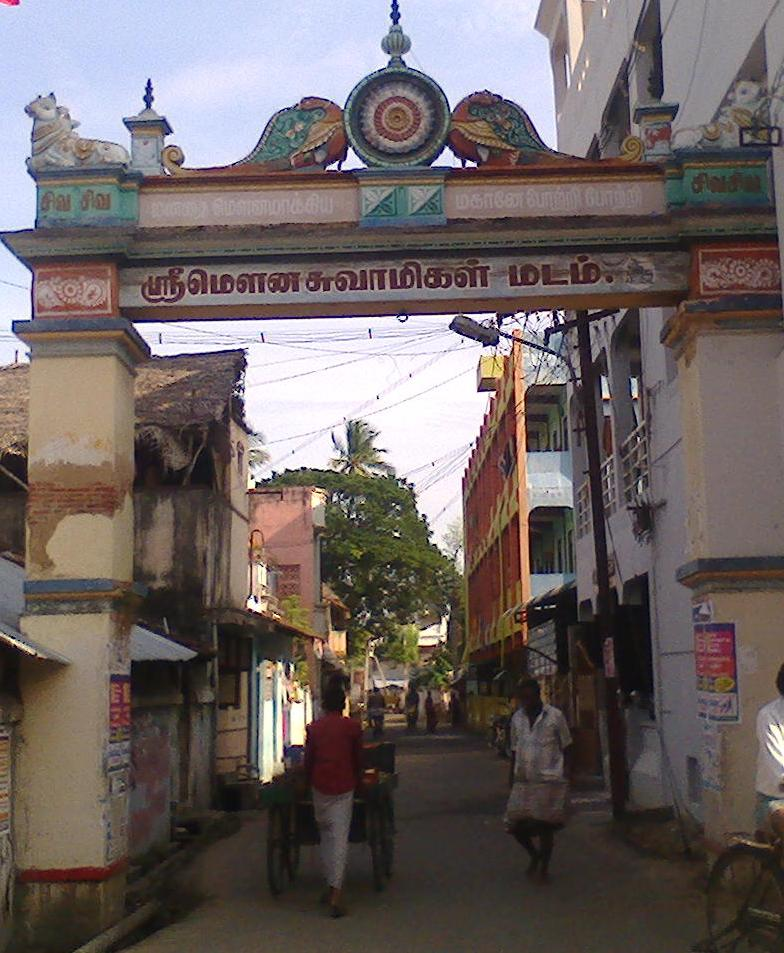
Mounasamy Mutt arch

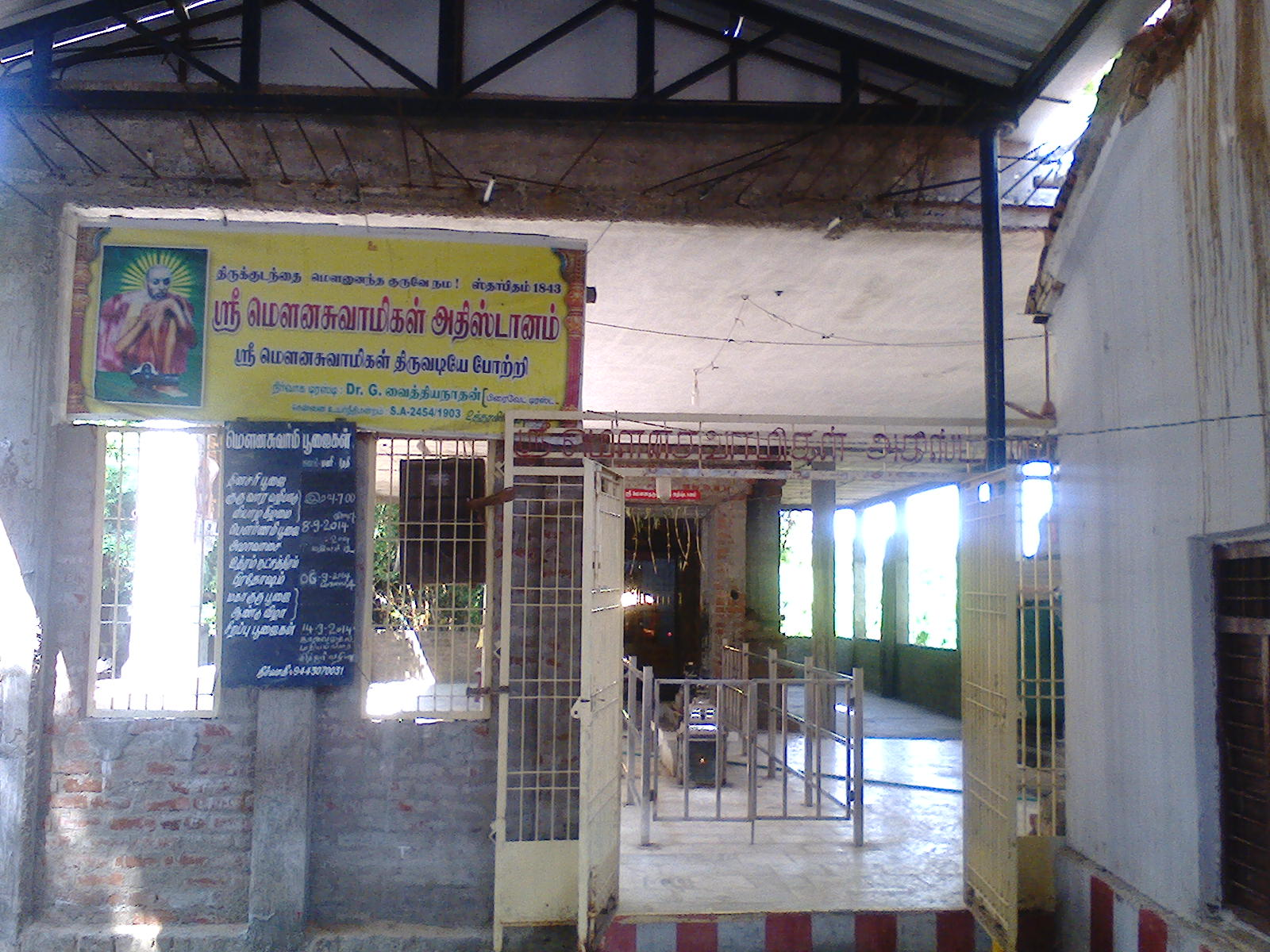
Mounasamy Mutt

Mounasamy Mutt, also called the Mounasamy Madam is a matha dedicated to Mounasamy, located in the town of Kumbakonam in Thanjavur District, Tamil Nadu, India.

== Location ==
This Mutt is located at Kumbakonam-Thanjavur road, near Adi Kumbeswarar Temple, at a distance of 2 km from Kumbakonam bus stand.

== Early days ==
In Thirubuvanam, Kumbakonam-Mayiladuthurai road, a man was found wandering here and there. He never spoke. He had no home, but was welcomed and feasted everywhere, and was the object of many vows. Somebody said that for sometime he drunk water only. Rain or shine everything is the same to him. Many from Kumbakonam came to see him. They wanted he should come over to Kumbakonam and halt there. The people of Thirubuvanam] was not in favour of sending him to Kumbakonam. They also said that if Mounasamy himself wanted to over there let him go there. Some days later a divine voice told the people of Thirubuvanam, to take him to Kumbakonam.

== Seeking blessings ==
Then he was taken on a palanquin to Kumbakonam where he was welcomed by the people. Many devotees came to see and got blessed by him. Many people thought their sufferings were relieved after seeing him. Swami Vivekananda who was on a trip to Kumbakonam came and worshipped Mounasmy. Annie Besant and Arundale of Brahmo Samaj also came and got his blessings. Many Europeans came over to see him. Arunachalasamy a saint from Tiruvannamalai came to see him at Kumbakonam. After seeing him Arunachalasamy threw the only loin cloth worn by him. He was always with Mounasamy. Kanchi seer praised the triumvirate Ramanar, Seshadri Swamigal and Kumbakonam Mounasamy. Devotees used to break cocoanuts in his presence or clothed him with fine garments if their desire was fulfilled.

== Samadhi ==
On 22 April 1899, he attained Samadhi. All from and around Kumbakonam offered their last respects to him. His body was taken around the town to the chanting of Tevaram. His body was lowered in a place, in the present Mutt, in sitting posture. Atop of it, a linga was consecrated. After he attained Samadhi, a Mutt was constructed and worshipped by one and all. His portrait was kept there.

== Other places ==
Sokkayyar of Sallakulam from Vadipatti in Pandya country of Tamil Nadu who came to see Mounasamy started doing service to him built a Mutt at Vadippatti, after the attainment of Samadhi and kept up a statue of Mounasamy and started worshipping him. During Guru Puja many number of devotees came over here. It is said that there are more than 20 Mutts for Mounasamy. Among other places they are in Ramanathapuram, Vadipatti, Trichy, Madurai, Sivagangai, Ponnamaravathi, Courtallam and Aruppukottai.

== Pujas ==
The place was worshipped daily. Nowadays special pujas are held here.
