= Arani Road Railway Junction =

Railway station in Tamil Nadu, India

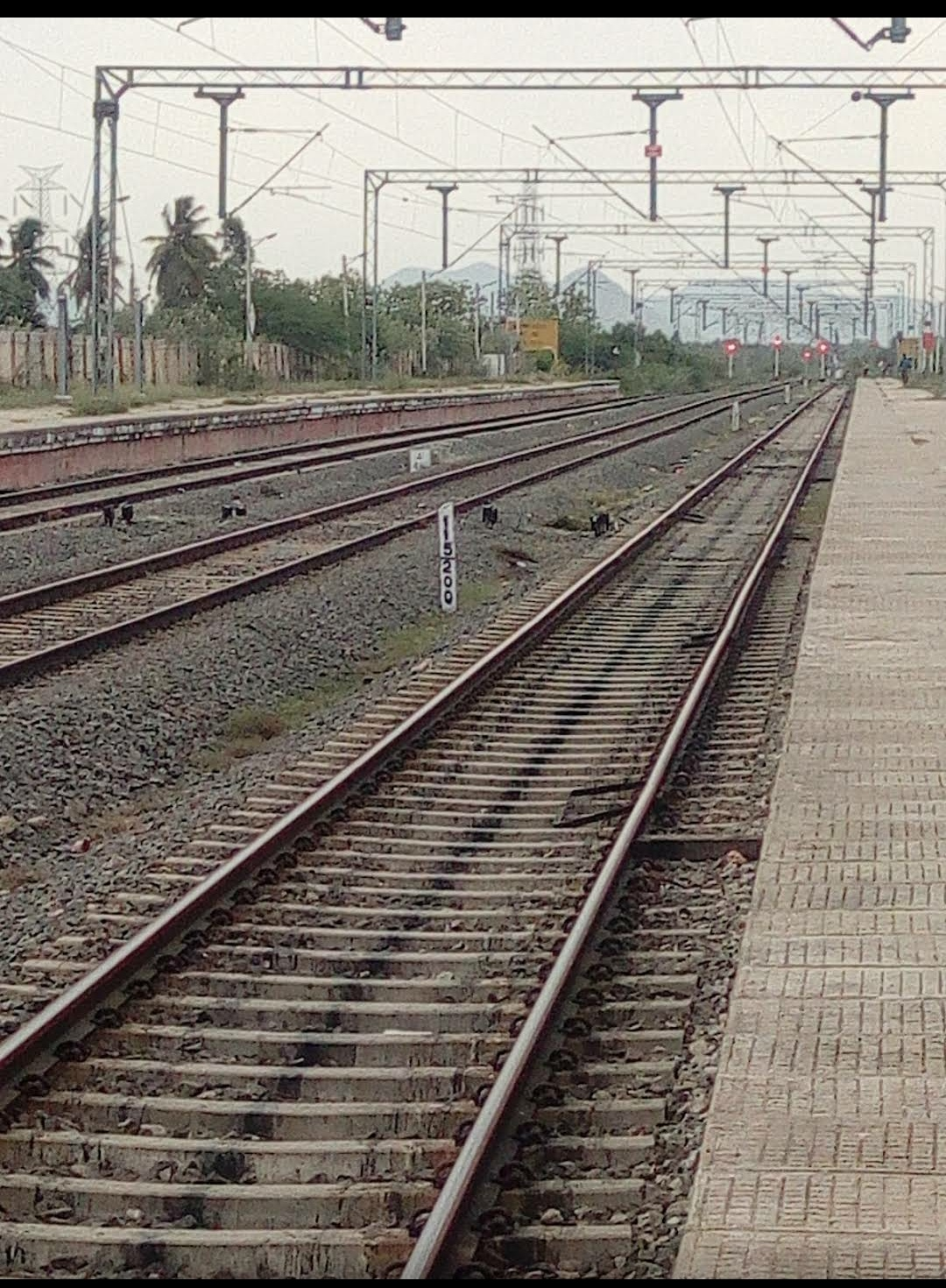
- Arani Road railway station

General information
- Location: Kalambur, Arani Tiruvannamalai District Tamil Nadu; India
- Coordinates: 12.6319317°N 79.2092837°E
- Elevation: 213 metres (699 ft)
- System: Express train and passenger train station
- Owner: Indian Railways
- Operator: Southern Railway zone
- Lines: Chennai Central–Tiruvannamalai City line Villupuram–Katpadi branch line Villupuram–Tirupathi line Arani Road line–Cuddalore line
- Platforms: 4
- Tracks: 9
- Connections: Bus interchange

Construction
- Parking: Yes
- Cycle facilities: Yes
- Accessible: Disabled access

Other information
- Station code: ARN
- Fare zone: Indian Railways

Services
Vellore, Bangalore, Tirupati, Chennai, Villupuram, Tiruvanamalai, Pondicherry, Cuddalore, Chidambaram, Trichy, Rameshwaram
Location
- Location within Tamil Nadu Location within India

Arani Road Railway Junction (station code: ARV) is an NSG–6 category Indian railway station in Tiruchirappalli railway division of Southern Railway zone. It is located in Kalambur, Arani in the Tiruvannamalai District. It was commissioned in 1889.

The Tindivanam route from the city of Nagari is planned by the central government to connect trains via Arani.
