= Seshadri Swamigal =

Indian saint

- Seshadri Swamigal

Personal life
- Born: Seshadri Kamakoti Sastri; 22 January 1870 Vazhur, Tamil Nadu, India
- Died: 4 January 1929 Annamalai (hill), Tamil Nadu, India

Religious life
- Religion: Hinduism

Seshadri Swamigal, also known as the "Saint with a Golden Hand", was an Indian holy man who was born in Kanchipuram, Tamil Nadu. He lived in Tiruvannaamalai, where he attained samadhi (a state of meditative consciousness).

== Life ==
=== Birth ===
Swamigal was born on 22 January 1870 in Vazhur, near Vandavasi in Tiruvannamalai district. Varadaraja Sastrigal and Maragatham were yearning for a male child to continue their family lineage. One night, Kamakshi appeared in Sastrigal's dream and said: "Offer butter and a child of wisdom shall be born". Maragatham conceived, and Seshadri was born on 22 January 1870 as a gift from Parasakthi.

=== Childhood ===
Swamigal went into trances as a child, and would sit on his father's lap in a meditative chin mudra pose. When his father was teaching a class, he would look at the book as though he were reading and comprehending it. At age four, Swamigal received the nickname "Golden Hand" (Tamil: Thanga Kai) after Swamigal and his mother stopped at a shop selling bronze castings of the gods. The young Swamigal picked up a statue of Krishna and asked his mother to buy it so he could perform a Krishna puja. Thinking that the child resembled Krishna, the merchant gave him the idol free of charge. The next day, the trader said the boy was lucky; his entire consignment of 1,000 statues sold in one day, instead of the usual one or two.

News of the incident spread quickly through the town, and the young boy was known as "the one with the golden hand". Swamigal worshiped the statue for many years, after which his younger brother Narasimha Josiar and his descendants continued to worship it.

When Swamigal was 14, his father died unexpectedly. Kamakoti Sastrigal took the family to live in Vazhur, where Swamigal completed his education. His mother died when he was 17, and his uncle Ramaswami Josiar and aunt Kalyani (who were childless) took charge of Swamigal and his younger brother, Narasimha Josiar.

On her deathbed, Swamigal's mother reportedly advised him to go to Arunachala. Deeply shaken after losing both of his parents, he sought refuge in pujas and tapas.

=== Initial following ===
Adi Shankara had established specific methods of worship for the goddess Kamakshi, bringing 30 devotees and their families from the Narmada River to Kanchipuram to ensure that his methods were followed. These devotees, who had Kamakshi as their family deity, were called Kamakoti Yaar.

Swamigal met Balaji Swamigal, a wandering holy man from North India, when he was 19 years old. Balaji gave him a sannyasa diksha (the only formal diksha Swamigal reportedly received) and instructed him in the Mahāvākyas, the four great sayings of the Upanishads. Swamigal then began traveling throughout Tamil Nadu, ending up in Tiruvannamalai within a year. He remained there as an ascetic for 40 years.

== Journey from Kanchipuram to Tiruvannamalai ==
On the day of the annual death ceremony for Swamigal's father, his aunt and uncle forcibly brought him home from the streets of Kanchipuram and locked him in a room of their home during the ceremony. When this room was opened after the ceremony to allow to seek the blessings of the departed souls and the priests performing the ceremony, they were shocked to find him missing from the locked room.

Swamigal's journey then took him to Kaveripakkam, 20 miles (32 km) west of Kanchipuram, where some relatives (including his elder maternal aunt) lived. He did not visit his relatives, but meditated at a temple. While walking around the temple, a snake climbed up on Swamigal and spread its hood as if to protect him. This was witnessed by his young cousin, Seshu, who told the town.

Learning about his presence in Kaveripakkam, his aunt and uncle rushed from Kanchipuram to find Swamigal meditating in the temple pond with a lingam made of tamarind rice and curd rice given as alms by his aunt, Sundarammal of Kaveripakkam. He had renounced attachment to worldly life, forcing his family to allow him to live as a mendicant. Swamigal's whereabouts were not clearly known after two or three months, probably because he never spent much time in one place. He arrived in Tindivanam, near Tiruvannamalai; he had taken a vow of silence, and was known as "Mouna Swamigal" (the eternally-silent saint). Devotee T. K. Kanniyar asked the priest at the Sri Thinthirine Eswarar temple to open the Yagasalai temple for Swamigal to meditate.

Swamigal asked that the room, used for performing homas (fire rituals), be locked from the outside and opened after four months. Concerned about Swamigal's health, the Sri Kuppuswamy priest opened the room on the fifth day to find Swamigal deep in meditation. Learning about the priest's apprehension, Swamigal immediately left Tindivanam. Passing through Maarchettikulam, he reached Aiyyanthoppu before contact with him was lost. Swamigal resurfaced several months later in Thoosimamadur's Pandava Caves, south of Kanchipuram. Crowds gathered when they learned of his presence, including his younger brother Narasimha Josiar. Swamigal left Thoosimamadur for North Arcot before the brothers could meet, however, and spent time in the Muthukumaraswamy and Brahmeswara Swamy temples.

He left Tirupattur, crossed the Javvadhu Hills and reached Padavedu (seven miles from Aathvaan Paadi), where he remained for two days. Tirupattur and Aathuvampaadi housed his relatives, and he may have passed through such towns without visiting them as an act of renunciation. The village of Thurinjikuppam is next to Aathuvampaadi, which Swamigal reportedly visited before reaching Tiruvannamalai. He remained in Tiruvannamalai until he reached samadhi. Ramaswami Josiar and Narasimha Josiar rushed to Tiruvannamalai to tell him that his aunt, Kalyani Ammal, had wanted to see him before she died. They asked the authorities to ensure that he was fed properly.

=== Teachings ===
As Swamigal's fame spread, local people called him a "wise lunatic" and he pitied them. Throughout his life, he emphasised the Arunachala kshetra.

=== Vallimalai Swamigal ===
Vallimalai Swamigal (b. 1870) was a holy man who was responsible for the spread of the Thiruppugazh and was a disciple of Ramana Maharshi. Maharshi ordered him to go to the foot of the Arunachala hill, where Seshadri Swamigal initiated Vallimalai.

When Vallimalai Swamigal began spreading the beauty of the Thiruppugazh, an old man asked for alms, ate 1.5 kilograms (3.3 lb) of porridge and disappeared; his disciples looked for the person with such a ravenous appetite. Beginning the next day, a mongoose would consume food meant for the old man. The caretaker of the burial grounds of Tiruvannamalai yearned to see Swamigal after his death, and Swamigal told him to go to Vallimalai. The caretaker saw the mongoose eating the food, people singing the Thirupugazh to it, and the mongoose turned into Seshadri Swamigal before disappearing.

=== Death ===
Swamigal died on January 4, 1929. His body was buried instead of cremated, as is customary for a holy man.

During his final days, Swamigal had a fever. Despite his reluctance, devotees shaved, bathed and dressed him for a photograph. They had a ceremonial crowning ceremony which Swamigal initially declined, fearing that it might worsen his fever. Yielding to his devotees' insistence, however, he relented. For several months Swamigal had repeatedly sought guidance from a devotee about constructing a new residence, symbolically contemplating departure from his mortal existence.

He roamed around town the day after the ceremony despite his fever and weakened. Swamigal then sat on the elavarsupattam(chinna Gurukal)house and died in that house . He was an elder of Ramana Maharshi for ten years, and Maharshi was present throughout his final rites.

== Ramana Maharshi ==
Swamigal and Ramana Maharshi were contemporaries, and Swamigal arrived at Arunachala six years before Maharshi did. When Maharshi came to Tiruvannamalai seven years after Swamigal's arrival, Swamigal took care of him. The similarity between the two sages was noted.

Swamigal's presence in shops was eagerly awaited, and sales increased. He would roam around town with a half-shaven face, wearing dirty clothes, oblivious to his surroundings or appearance. Swamigal predicted the death of an apparently-healthy child, and gave successful dietary advice to a sick man at Arunachala.

== Ashram and temple ==
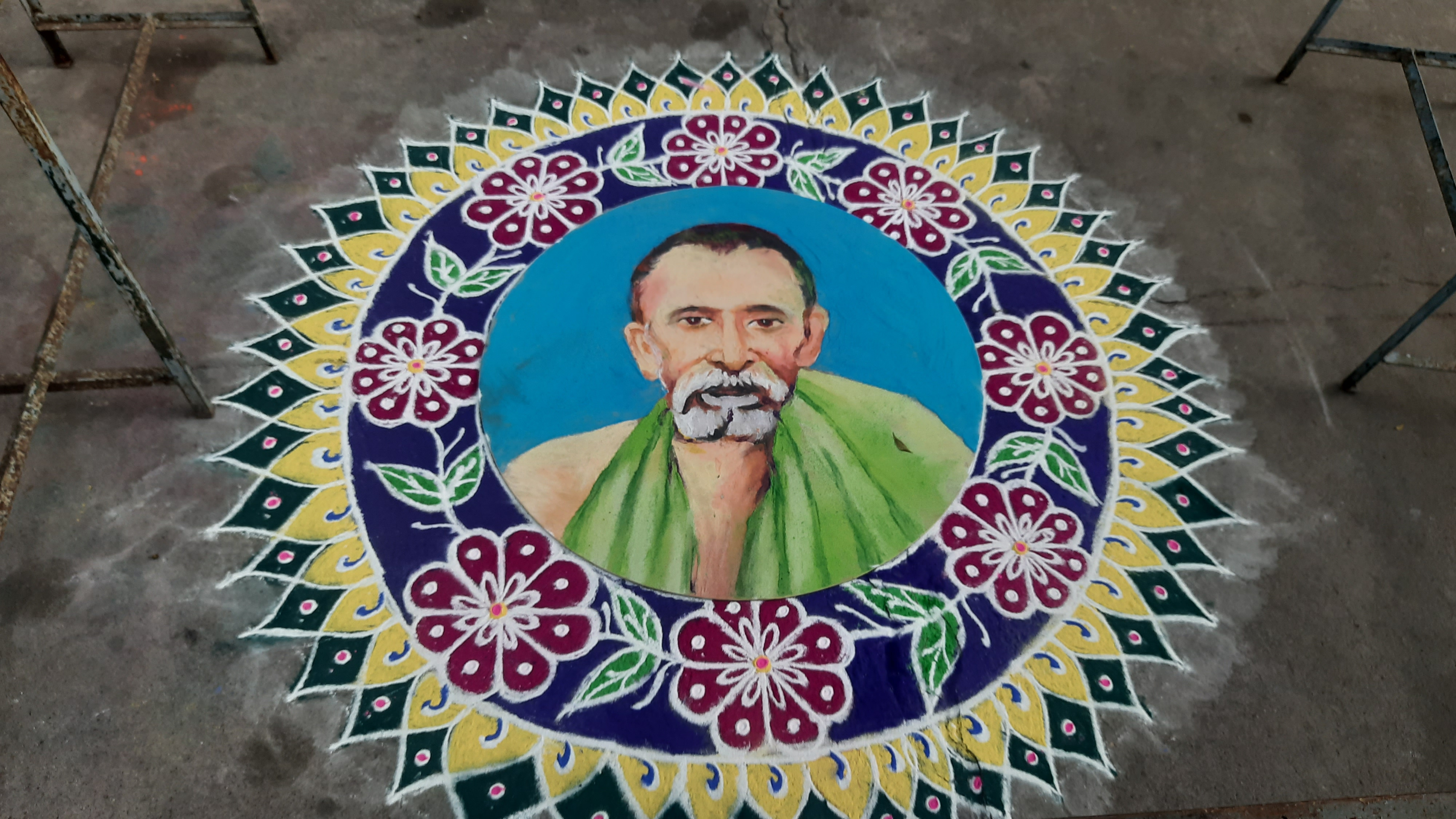
A rangoli made at the ashram for Swamigal's birthday in 2020

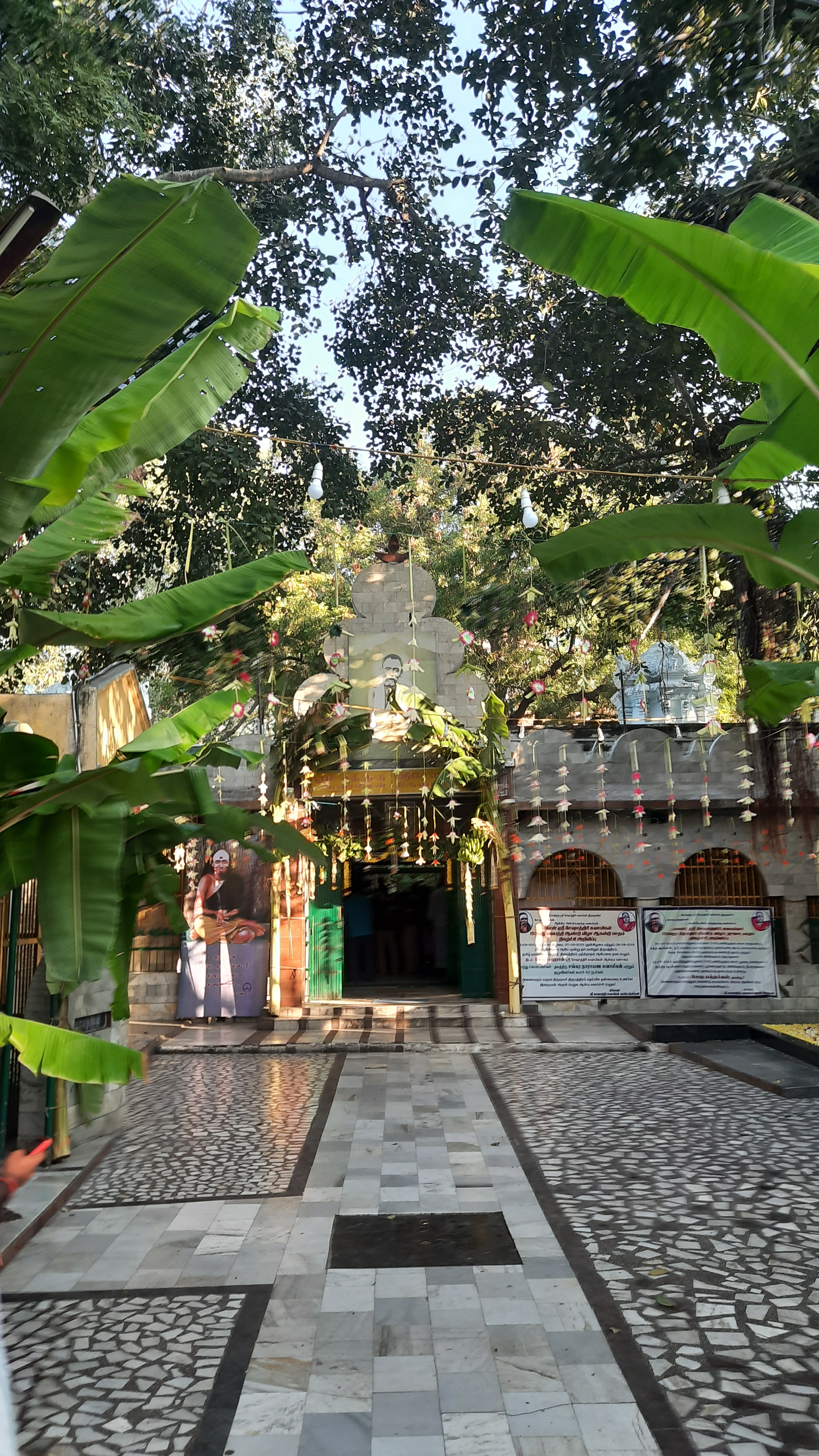
Temple main entrance

The Seshadri Swamigal Ashram is in Tiruvannamalai, near Ramanasramam. The Sundaravadanam Perumal temple in Vazhur, Swamigal's birthplace, was scheduled to be consecrated on 12 February 2012.
