= Birudur =

- Village
- Location within Tamil Nadu Location within India
- Coordinates: 12°30′N 79°38′E
- Country: India
- State: Tamil Nadu
- District: Tiruvannamalai
- Taluk: Vandavasi

Population (2001)
  - Total: 1,521

Birudur is a village located in the Vandavasi taluk of Tiruvanamalai district in the state of Tamil Nadu, in South India.

== Location ==
Birudur is located at State Highway 115, between Vandavasi and Melmaruvathur. It is just 3 km away from Vandavasi and well connected to Chennai(113 km) by road.

== Demographics ==
As per 2001 India census, Birudur had a population of 1521 living in 364 households. Birudur had a sex ratio (No of females/1000 males) of 1012 (Child Sex ratio is 1231), higher than national average of 944. Jainism & Hinduism are the main religions followed here.

Birudur: Census 2001
Parameter	Population	Male	Female	Percentage
Total Population	1521	756	765	100
Child Population (0–6)	174	78	96	12.92
Literates Population	995	562	433	73.87
Workers Population	656	422	234	43.13

== See also ==
- Tamil Jain
