= Olin Chaddock Wilson =

American astronomer (1909–1994)

- Born: January 13, 1909; San Francisco, California, U.S.
- Died: July 14, 1994 (aged 85); West Lafayette, Indiana, U.S.
- Education: Ph.D. (1934)
- Alma mater: California Institute of Technology
- Known for: Stellar spectroscopy
- Spouse: Katherine E. Johnson (m. 1943)
- Children: Nicole, Randall
- Awards: Bruce Medal (1984)
- Scientific career
- Fields: Astronomy
- Thesis: Comparison of the Balmer and Paschen Series of Hydrogen in Stellar Spectra (1934)

Olin Chaddock Wilson (January 13, 1909 – July 13, 1994) was an American astronomer best known for his work as a stellar spectroscopist.

Born in San Francisco, California as the son of a lawyer, Wilson showed an interest in physics at an early age. He studied astronomy and physics at the University of California, Berkeley and wrote his first scientific paper in 1932 on the subject of the speed of light. He received his PhD from the California Institute of Technology in 1934.

Wilson was a staff member of Mount Wilson Observatory (not named after Olin Wilson) for most of his research career where he studied stellar chromospheres. He was the first scientist to discover activity cycles, similar to the solar 11-year sunspot cycle, in other stars. In collaboration with Vainu Bappu, an Indian astronomer, he also showed that there was a correlation between the width of the Ca II lines in stellar spectra and the star's luminosity, the Wilson–Bappu effect.

He gave the Henry Norris Russell Lectureship in 1977 and won the Bruce Medal in 1984.
