= Sri Yoga Rama temple =

Hindu temple in Tamil Nadu

Sri Yoga Rama Perumal Kovil
- Location in Tamil Nadu

Religion
- Affiliation: Hinduism
- District: Tiruvannamalai
- Deity: Sri Yoga Ramaswamy (Vishnu), Shengamalavalli Thayar (Lakshmi)

Location
- Location: Nedumgunam, Chettupattu
- State: Tamil Nadu
- Country: India
- Interactive map of Sri Yoga Rama Perumal Kovil
- Coordinates: 12.5°N 79.62°E

Architecture
- Type: Dravidian architecture
- Creator: Pallavas and Vijayanagara kings

Sri Yoga Ramaswamy Temple, Nedumgunam is a Hindu temple in Nedumgunam, Chettupattu, dedicated to the god Rama.

This temple has inscriptions of Rajaraja II. Rama is believed to have appeared to Sage Shuka and the Alvars at the temple's site. The temple is classified one among the 108 Abhimana Kshethram of Vaishnavate tradition. Six daily rituals and a dozen yearly festivals are held there, of which the chariot festival, celebrated during the Tamil month of Chittirai (March–April), is the most prominent. The temple is open from 6 am to 7:30 pm. It is maintained and administered by the Hindu Religious and Endowment Board of the Government of Tamil Nadu.

== Legend ==
Once the sage Shuka wanted to view the darshan of the god Rama. He performed severe penance towards Rama. Pleased, Rama appeared to Shuka. Shuka gave a set of sacred palm leaves and told Hanuman to read them. While reading the divine sacred hymns in the palm leaves, Rama understands that it is the Brahma sutras and explains the essence of the Sutras with Chin mudra (gesture of knowledge) to Hanuman. Rama appears with the same mudra in the central icon. This temple represents Rama as a guru (teacher) and Hanuman as disciple (shishya) learning the Sutras from Rama.

== History ==
The temple is said to be built first by the Pallavas and later by King Krishnadevaraya. The temple has 2 Tall Gopurams. The first one is the tallest and is the entrance Gopuram and the second one is called Killi Gopuram dedicated to Shuka there is a Mandapam also dedicated to Shuka. The temple is almost 8 acres and is the biggest Rama temple in Tamil Nadu. There are wonderful Madapams Sculpted and various Shrines for Alvars, Vishvaksena, Garuda, Vaikhanasa Deva Venkateshwara and Krishna.

== Religious Significance ==
Rama is in seated posture, without his usual attributes of bow and arrow, and his hand in Chin mudra. Lakshmana is standing with the bow and arrow and Rama's consort Sita on the other side of Rama. Hanuman is placed in a way of reading the sacred Sutras and Rama explaining them. Rama is worshiped by Shuka and many other sages.

The Theertham of the Temple is also called as Shuka Theertham or Surya Theertham.
