= Sampathgiri =

Hill in Tamil Nadu, India

Lakshmi Narasimha Swamy Perumal Temple
- Lakshmi Narasimha Swamy Perumal Temple
- Location in Tamil Nadu

Religion
- Affiliation: Hinduism
- District: Tiruvannamalai
- Deity: Lakshmi Narasimha Swamy (Narasimha); Kanagavalli Thayar (Lakshmi)

Location
- Location: polur
- State: Tamil Nadu
- Country: India
- Coordinates: 12°30′35″N 79°06′58″E

Architecture
- Type: South Indian architecture
- Creator: Vijayanagara Kings

Sampathgiri Lakshmi Narasimha Swamy Perumal Temple is a huge hill in the centre of Polur, Tamil Nadu, India. This hill has been dedicated to Lord Narasimha, and a temple was constructed in ancient times on the hill. Many celebrities and personalities have visited this temple and donated to its renovation. South Indian actor Sivaji Ganesan donated a huge amount for the renovation of the steps to the temple on the hill. The temple is very Important in the Vaishnavate tradition and is an Abhimana Kshethram.

== Legend ==
Two great Rishis Performed severe penance in this hill towards Lord Narasimha. Lord was pleased and gave 1 mango to them. Both the Rishis fought for the mango and Pulasthriya Rishi cut Kolasthriya Rishi's hands. Even after this incident Kolasthriya Rishi continued his worship for 1 Mandalam (48 Days). After this incident Lord Narasimha appeared Swayambu on the mountain and showered his divine Grace towards the Rishi. He also retrieved his hands and told him to install the Utsava murthi on the Foot of the hill.

== Architecture and significance ==
The Temple Steps were built by the Vijayanagara Kings, and the temples were built in Various periods of History. There is a cave, Annai guaha, and there are 2 theerthams, Brahma teertham and pulasthirya theertham.
