= Wilson–Bappu effect =

Correlation among statistics of a star

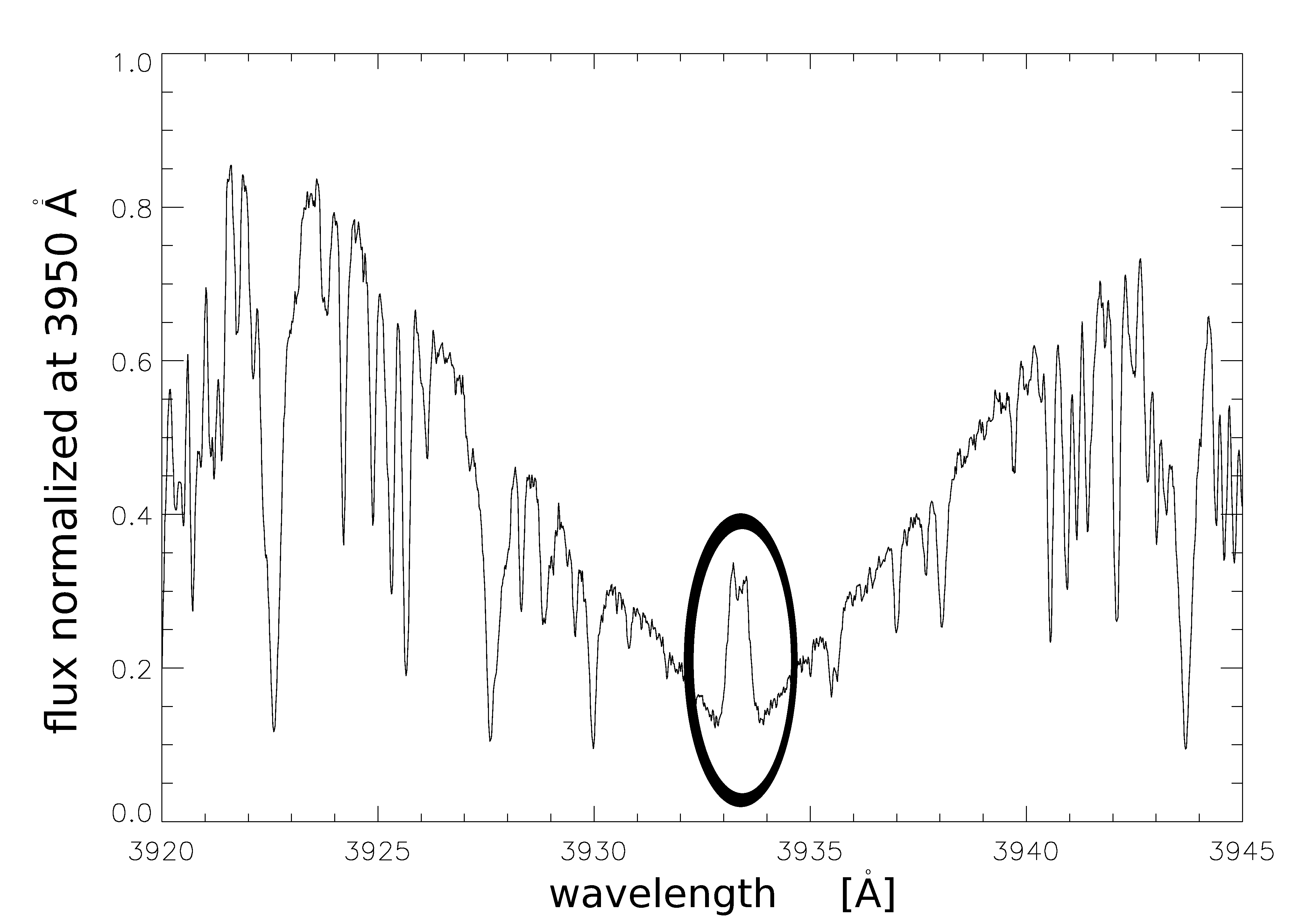
K line spectrum of KW 326, a dwarf star in the Praesepe open cluster. The line is very wide and deep, and it originates in the photosphere, just like any other absorption line. Several other lines are superimposed on it. In the center, the emission due to the K line itself, which takes place in the chromosphere.

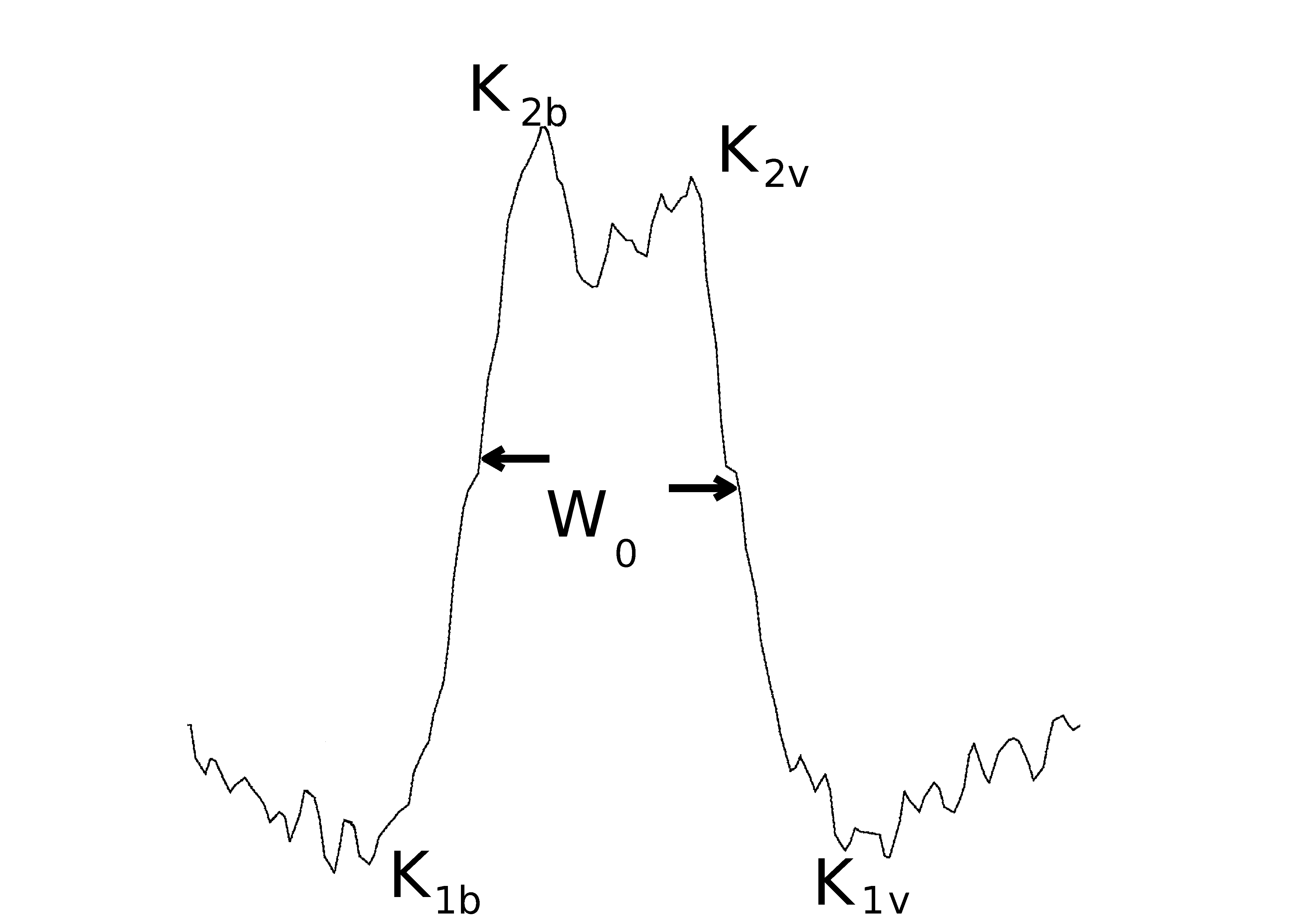
Zoom on the emission core. W_{0} is defined as the difference in wavelength between the points on either side of the emission at an average intensity between the K1 minimum and the K2 maximum

The Ca II K line in cool stars is a strong photospheric absorption line that exhibits an emission line at its core originating in the star's chromosphere. In 1957, Olin C. Wilson and M. K. Vainu Bappu reported on the remarkable correlation between the measured width of this emission core and the absolute magnitude of the star. This relationship is now known as the Wilson–Bappu effect. The correlation is independent of spectral type and is applicable to stellar classification main sequence types G, K, and Red giant type M. The greater the emission band width, the brighter the star, which provides an empirical correlation with distance.

== Application as a distance indicator ==
The Wilson–Bappu effect elicited some interest in the past for its potential as a standard candle. The method can be calibrated using nearby stars for which independent distance measurements are available, allowing the relationship to be expressed in a simple analytical form. Historically, the Wilson–Bappu effect was calibrated using stars within 100 parsecs from the Sun.

Once calibrated, the width of the emission core (W_{0}) of the K line can be measured in distant stars. From W_{0} and the analytical expression of the Wilson–Bappu effect, it is possible to determine the absolute magnitude of the star. The distance then follows immediately from knowledge of both absolute and apparent magnitude, provided that the interstellar reddening is either negligible or well known.

== Calibrations ==
The first calibration of the Wilson–Bappu effect using distances from Hipparcos parallaxes was made in 1999 by Wallerstein et al. A later work also used W_{0} measurements on high-resolution spectra taken with CCD detectors, though with a smaller sample.

According to the latest calibration, the relation between absolute visual magnitude (M_{v}) expressed in magnitudes and W_{0}, expressed in km/s, is:

$M_V=33.2-18.0 \log(W_0)$

== Limitations ==
The observational uncertainty is quite large, with typical errors of about 0.5 magnitudes. This renders the effect too imprecise to significantly improve the cosmic distance ladder. Another limitation stems from the fact that measuring W_{0} in distant stars is very challenging and requires long observations with large telescopes. Furthermore, the emission feature in the core of the K line can be affected by interstellar extinction. In such cases, accurate measurement of W_{0} is not possible.

== Extensions ==
The Wilson–Bappu effect is also valid for the Mg II k line. However, since the Mg II k line lies at 2796.34 Å in the ultraviolet, and radiation at this wavelength does not reach Earth's surface, it can only be observed with space-based instruments such as the International Ultraviolet Explorer.

In 1977, Stencel published a spectroscopic survey showing that the wing emission features seen in the broad wings of the K line among higher-luminosity late-type stars share a correlation between line width and M_{v} similar to the Wilson–Bappu effect.
