= Sothukanni =

Village in Tamil Nadu, India

Sothukanni sothukanni
- village
- Country: India
- State: Tamil Nadu
- District: Tiruvannamalai

Languages
  - Official: Tamil
- Time zone: UTC+5:30 (IST)
- Vehicle registration: TN-
- Coastline: 0 kilometres (0 mi)

Sothukanni is a village in Polur taluk, Tiruvannamalai district, Tamil Nadu. It is at a distance of 8 kilometers from Polur. This village is famous for its Mariyamman Temple. Every year during Kanum Pongal, thousands of people from various villages and towns come to Sothukanni.

The village has about 700 permanent residents.

It has Siddhar Subramaniya Sadaiyappar samathy, every year "Guru Poojai" will be conducted and 'Annadanam' provided to the devotees.
