= Kandiyanallur =

- village
- Location in Tamil Nadu, India Kandiyanallur (India)
- Coordinates: 12.382969°N 79.597034°E
- Country: India
- State: Tamil Nadu

Languages
  - Official: Tamil = Tamil
  - Other: Telugu = Telugu
- Time zone: UTC+5:30 (IST)

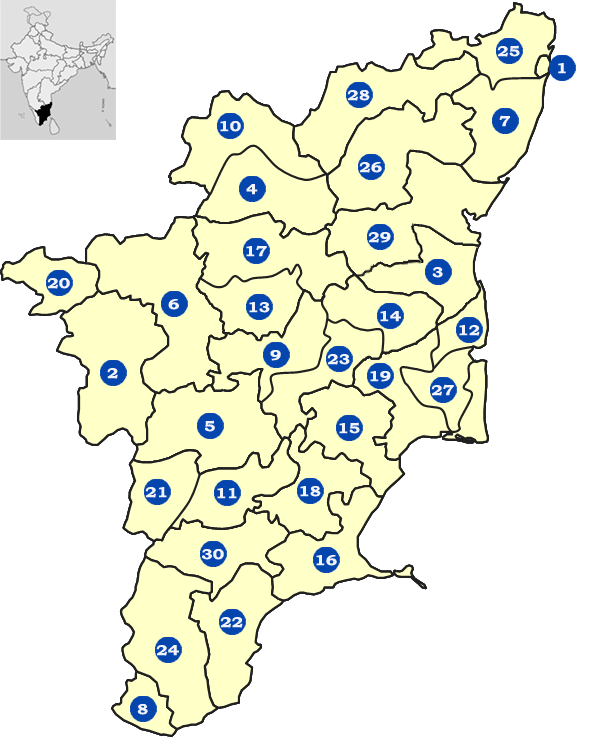
Districts of Tamil Nadu

Kandiyanallur is a village located south west of Chennai in Tamil Nadu, India. It is a part of Vandavasi Taluk in the district of Thiruvannamalai. According to the 2011 Government of India Census data, there are a total of 79 families residing in the village. The population is 270 of which 138 are male and 132 are female. The village is administrated by an elected Sarpanch. The primary occupation of the villagers is Agriculture.

== Politics ==
Kandiyanallur comes under the Vandavasi Vidhan Sabha constituency of the State of Tamil Nadu. This seat is reserved for Scheduled Caste

The winner of the 2016 Vidhan Sabha election was Ambethkumar, S from DMK with 80206 votes and runner up was Meganathan, V from AIADMK with 62138 votes.

Previous results are listed below

Year	A C No.	Constituency Name	Category	Winner	Sex	Party	Votes	Runner up	Gender	Party	Votes
2011	69	Vandavasi	(SC)	Gunaseelan.V	M	AIADMK	84529	Kamalakkannan.J	M	DMK	72233
2009	By Polls	Vandavasi	(SC)	J. Kamalakanna	F	DMK	78827	P. Munusamy	M	AIADMK	40810
2006	51	Vandavasi	(SC)	Jayaraman S P	M	DMK	65762	Chakkrapani.M	M	AIADMK	42974
2001	51	Vandavasi	(SC)	Murugavelrajan.K	M	PMK	55773	Loganathan .K.	M	DMK	46902
1996	51	Vandavasi	(SC)	Anandan, Bala	M	DMK	65775	Gunaseelan, V.	M	ADMK	26029
1991	51	Vandavasi	(SC)	Thamazharasan C.K.	M	ADK	55990	Rajagopal V.	M	DMK	26496
1989	51	Vandavasi	(SC)	Dhanaraj, V.	M	DMK	35264	Govindan, T.S.	M	INC	21176
1984	51	Vandavasi	(SC)	A. Arumugham	M	INC	48712	V. Rajagopal	M	DMK	38326
1980	51	Vandavasi	(SC)	Kuppusami, C	M	ADK	38501	Kanniappan, C	M	DMK	36019
1977	51	Vandavasi	(SC)	P. Munuswamy	M	ADK	28306	C. Kanniappan	M	DMK	26476

== Education ==
PUPS-KANDIYANALLUR is a Tamil medium co-educational school located in the village. School is approved for Primary level education and works under the management of Local body.

== News ==
In 2010, seven ancient apparently Panchaloha idols were unearthed around an ancient Siva temple.
