= Ponmalai Nathar Temple =

1000 yr. old construction

Ponmalai Nathar Temple, also known as Kanagagireeswar temple is in Devikapuram, Tamil Nadu, India.
