= Sevvur =

Sevur
- Village
- Location in Tamil Nadu, India Sevur (India)
- Coordinates: 10.26°N 78.60°E
- Country: India
- State: Tamil Nadu
- District: Sivaganga

Languages
  - Official: Tamil
- Time zone: UTC+5:30 (IST)
- Vehicle registration: TN-
- Nearest city: Ponnamaravathy, Karaikudi
- Lok Sabha constituency: Sivagangai

Sevvur is a small village in Sivagangai district in the state of Tamil Nadu. It is a Chettinad / Nagarathar village of "Mela Vattagai" group.

It is a semi arid place. There is a temple named Roat Perumal Koil. Rottu Perumal Kovil very famous for Purattasi Saturdays. It has three roads. The main street is known as the Shivan Koil street as it has a Shivan koil. There is Subbiah Kovil in the small Medu near the school.
