= Aarani Municipality =

Aarani Municipality Silk city
- Selection Grade Municipality
- Nickname: Silk & Rice city
- Location within Tamil Nadu Location within India
- Coordinates: 12.6751077°N 79.2843245°E
- country: India
- State: Tamilnadu
- District: Tiruvannamalai
- Region: Tondai Region
- State Assembly: Aarani State Assembly
- Parliament Assembly: Aarani Parliament constitution
- Revenue Division: Aarani Revenue Division
- Founder: Tamilnadu Government

Government
  - Type: Selection Grade
  - Body: Arani Municipality
  - Chief minister: Edappadi Palanisamy
  - Aarani Parliament member: M.k.Vishnu Prasad
  - State Assembly member: Mr.Sevoor.Ramachandiran
  - District Collector: K.s.Kandhasamy IAS
  - Municipality Leader: Ashok Kumar

Area
  - Selection Grade Municipality: 35.64 km^{2} (13.76 sq mi)
  - Rank: 151 m
- Elevation: 171 m (561 ft)

Population (2011)
  - Selection Grade Municipality: 92,375
  - Rank: 39
  - Metro: 119,274

Language
- Time zone: UTC+5:30
- Postal code: 632301, 632316
- Area code: 04173
- Vehicle registration: TN97
- Website: Aarani Municipality

Aarani is a municipality city in district of Tiruvannamalai, Tamil Nadu, India. The Aarani city is divided into 33 wards for which elections are held every 5 years. The Aarani Municipality has population of 92375 of which 45,187 are males while 47188 are females as per report released by Census India 2011.

The population of children aged 0-6 is 6346 which is 9.97% of total population of Aarani (M). In Arani Municipality, the female sex ratio is 1036 against state average of 996. Moreover, the child sex ratio in Arani is around 983 compared to Tamil Nadu state average of 943. The literacy rate of Arani city is 85.41% higher than the state average of 80.09%. In Arani, male literacy is around 91.62% while the female literacy rate is 79.45%.

Aarani Municipality has total administration over 24,889 houses to which it supplies basic amenities like water and sewerage. It is also authorize to build roads within Municipality limits and impose taxes on properties coming under its jurisdiction.
