= Kalasapakkam block =

Coordinates: 12°25′0″N 79°6′0″E

Kalasapakkam block is a revenue block in the Tiruvannamalai district of Tamil Nadu, India. It has a total of 45 panchayat villages.
