= Vainu Bappu Observatory =

Indian observatory

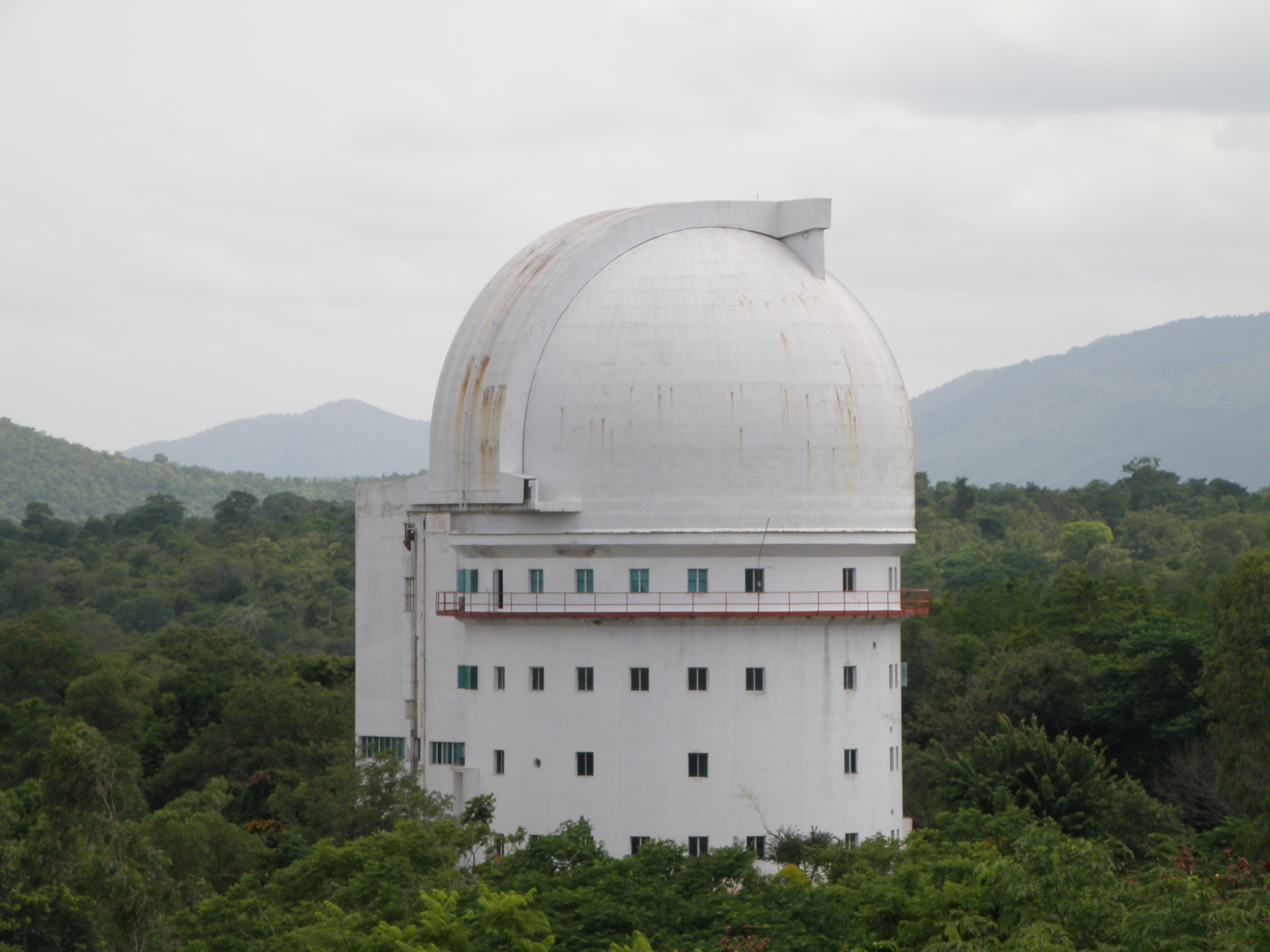
- The 2.1-meter telescope seen from the 1-meter telescope at Vainu Bappu Observatory
- Alternative names: Kavalur Observatory
- Organization: Indian Institute of Astrophysics
- Observatory code: 220
- Location: Kavalur, Vaniyambadi Taluk, Tirupathur district, Tamil Nadu, India
- Coordinates: 12°34′29″N 78°49′14″E
- Altitude: 700 m (2,300 ft)
- Established: 1986
- Website: www.iiap.res.in?q=vbo_vbt

Telescopes
- Vainu Bappu Telescope: 2.3 meter reflector
- Carl Zeiss telescope: 1 meter reflector
- Related media on Commons

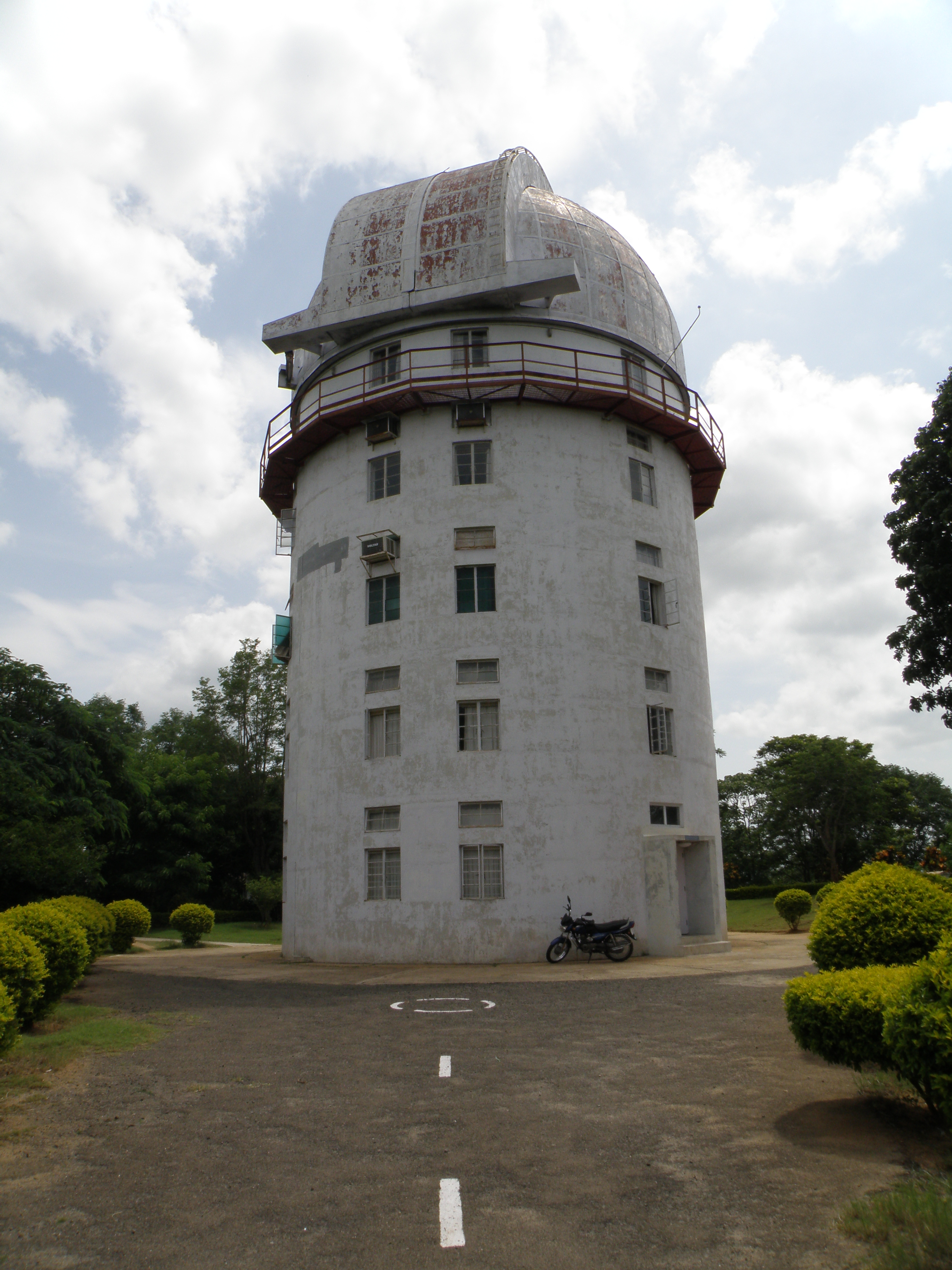
1-meter telescope building at Vainu Bappu Observatory

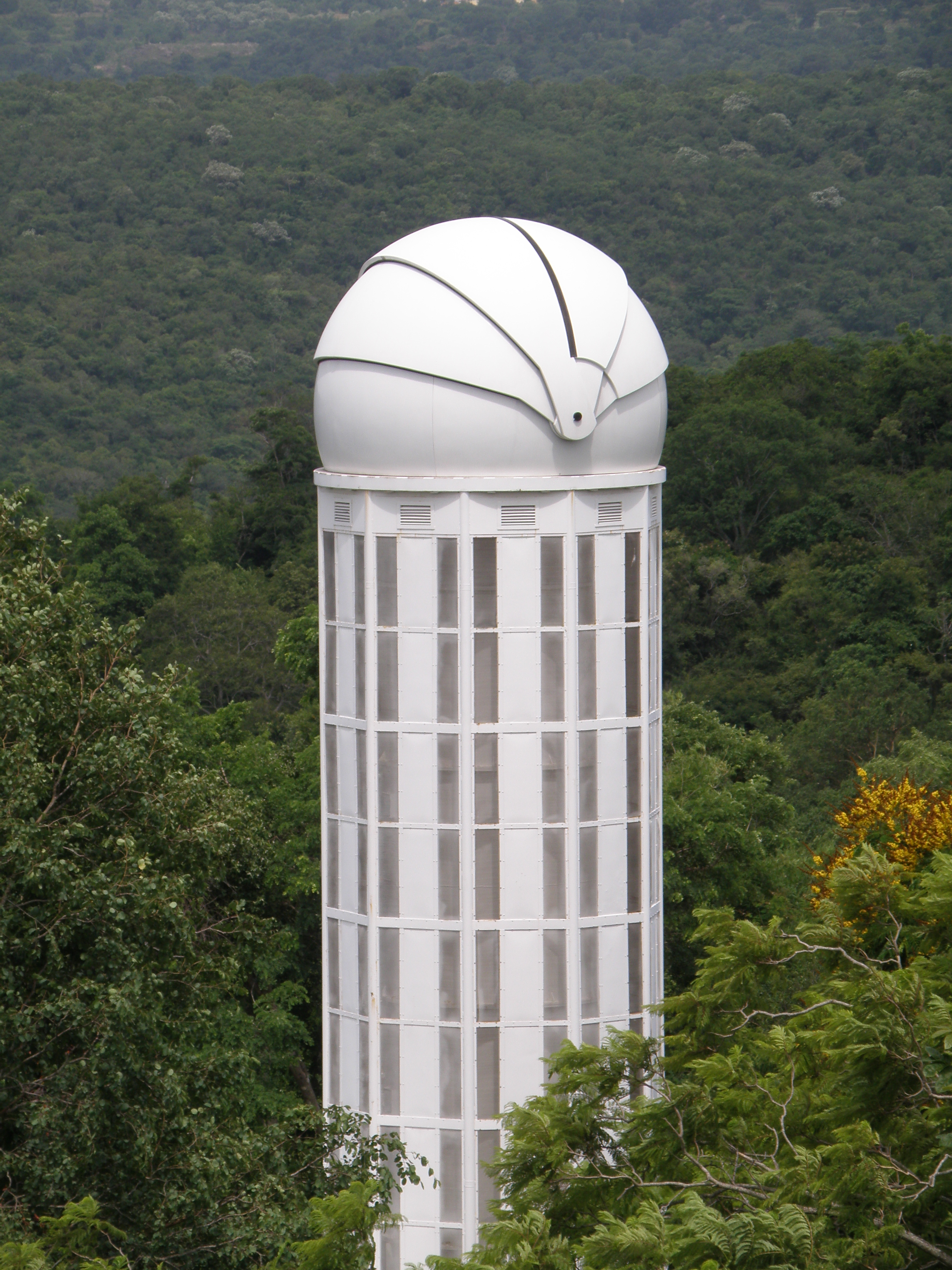
38-centimeter telescope seen from the 1-meter telescope at Vainu Bappu Observatory

The Vainu Bappu Observatory is an astronomical observatory owned and operated by the Indian Institute of Astrophysics. It is located at Kavalur in the Javadi Hills, near Vaniyambadi in Tirupathur district, Vellore region in the Indian state of Tamil Nadu. It is 200 km south-west of Chennai and 175 km south-east of Bengaluru.

== History ==
The Vainu Bappu Observatory of the Indian Institute of Astrophysics traces its origin back to 1786 when William Petrie set up his private observatory at his garden house at Egmore, Madras, which eventually came to be known as the Madras Observatory. Later it was moved to Kodaikanal and functioned there as the Kodaikanal Observatory since 1899.

However, Kodaikanal had very few nights available for observation and hence astronomers searched for a new site after India's independence. M.K. Vainu Bappu who took over as the director of the Kodaikanal Observatory in 1960, found a sleepy little hamlet called Kavalur in the Javadi Hills as a suitable site for establishing optical telescopes for observing celestial objects. This came to be known as Kavalur Observatory.

Observations began in 1968 with a 38 cm telescope made in the backyard of the Kodaikanal Observatory.

== Location ==
Kavalur observatory is located in Kavalur in the Javadi Hills in Alangayam. The Kavalur Observatory is located in a 40-hectare forest land in Tamil Nadu which is strewn with a variety of greenery of tropical region besides a number of medicinal plants with an occasional appearance of some wildlife like deer, snakes and scorpions. Several varieties of birds have also been spotted in the campus. The observatory is at an altitude of 725m above mean sea level (longitude 78° 49.6' E; latitude 12° 34.6' N). Apart from being reasonably away from city lights and industrial areas, the location has been chosen in order to be closer to the earth's equator for covering both northern and southern hemispheres with equal ease. In addition, its longitudinal position is such that it is the only major astronomical facility between Australia and South Africa for observing the southern objects.

== Initial setup ==
The first telescope was of 38 cm (15-inch) aperture, with which astronomical observations were started in 1968 at Kavalur Observatory. The 75 cm (30-inch) telescope has been completely designed and fabricated at the workshops of the Indian Institute of Astrophysics. In 1972 a 1-metre (40-inch) telescope made by Carl Zeiss Jena was installed at Kavalur.

== 2.3-metre Vainu Bappu Telescope ==
Vainu Bappu started the 2.3-metre (93-inch) aperture telescope, designed and built within the country. Bappu died in 1982 and would not see the completion of the telescope. On 6 January 1986, the observatory was renamed as Vainu Bappu Observatory and the 2.3-metre telescope as Vainu Bappu Telescope. The telescope is so powerful that it can easily resolve a 25 paise coin kept forty kilometres away. Deep sky observations are carried out with this telescope using a variety of focal plane instruments. The equatorially mounted horse-shoe-yoke structure of the telescope is ideally suited for low latitudes and permits easy observation near the north celestial pole. The telescope has a F/3.25 paraboloid primary of 2.3 m diameter with the prime focus image scale of 27 arcsec/mm and a Cassegrain focus image scale of 6.7 arcsec/mm. This telescope has been operated as a national facility and attracts proposals from all over the country and sometimes from outside India.

== Equipment ==
The observatory is home to the Vainu Bappu Telescope, the largest telescope in Asia until a 3.6-meter telescope was set up at Devasthal, Nainital, by ARIES. It has a diameter of 2.3 meters and was first used in 1986. Along with the Vainu Bappu telescope, the observatory has two other telescopes: A 1-meter Zeiss manufactured and another 75-centimeter Cassegrain reflector currently being refurbished. The observatory also has a Fabry–Pérot interferometer.

- Technical details
  - Primary mirror diameter: 234 cm
  - Prime focus: f/3.25 with a scale of 27".1/mm
  - Cassegrain focus: f/13 with a scale of 6".8/mm
  - Guiding: remote, manual guiding
- Instruments available
  - At PRIME focus:
    - Imaging camera with a 3-element Wynne corrector
    - High-resolution Echelle spectrograph
- Detector
  - 4096×4096 pixels TEK CCD, with a pixel size of 12 micrometres
  - At CASSEGRAIN focus:
    - Medium-resolution spectropolarimeter
    - Medium-resolution Optometrics Research spectrograph (OMRS)
- Detector
  - 1024×1024 pixels TEK CCD, with a pixel size of 24 micrometres

== Discoveries ==
The 1-metre telescope is associated with two unique discoveries in the Solar System. In 1972, atmosphere was detected around Jupiter's satellite Ganymede and in the year 1977, participated in the observations that confirmed rings were discovered around the planet Uranus. In 1984, Kavalur reported the discovery of a thin outer ring around Saturn.

On 17 February 1988, a new minor planet was discovered using the 45 cm Schmidt telescope. It has been named 4130 Ramanujan after the Indian mathematical genius Srinivasa Ramanujan. This is the first such discovery from India in the 20th century.

== Scientific activities ==
Front-line research is being carried out with the help of the optical telescopes at Vainu Bappu Observatory using several focal plane instrumentational facilities. The ongoing programmes include observations of stars, star clusters, novae, supernovae, blazars, galaxies, optical imaging of gamma-ray burst fields, stellar populations, solar system objects and many others.

The telescopes at the observatory had started with relatively modest focal plane instruments and later on graduated to more sophisticated ones. These include cameras for fast photography, photoelectric photometers, a single-channel photoelectric spectrum scanner, a medium resolution spectrograph, a quartz-prism calibration spectrograph, infrared photometer, image tube spectrograph, a Universal Astronomical Grating Spectrograph (UAGS from Zeiss), high-resolution echelle spectrograph and a polarimeter. Photographic plates were the principal detectors in the early days. Presently the charge-coupled devices (CCD) have replaced the photographic plates. Some micro-processor-controlled photon counting systems were designed and fabricated which have been used in a variety of observational projects. A fibre linked echelle spectrograph is under construction.

On campus maintenance facilities like aluminising plants for coating the telescope mirrors, mechanical and electrical workshops, electronics labs, along with a liquid nitrogen plant are at hand for the smooth functioning of the observatory. Highly advanced technical facilities like SUN workstations are available at the telescopes for handling the CCD data, along with specialised data reduction packages such as IRAF, STSDAS and DAOPHOT. Communication facilities, like e-mail via VSAT satellite connection, are available for all users for the telescopes.

A programme of ultraflow dispersion spectroscopy was successfully used to survey stars in the Large Magellanic Cloud (LMC). Of the ten supernovae observed so far, SN1987A in LMC was observed in great detail using the 1 m and the 75 cm telescopes despite its low elevation in the southern sky, proving the worth of the geographic location of Kavalur. In fact the observations of the supernova were started within 48 hours of the discovery.

Observational studies of evolved stars, in particular studies related to their evolutionary aspects, carried out at this observatory, have received critical acclaim and international recognition. The observational facilities at this Observatory have yielded many PhD theses for the scholars of the Institute as well as of other institutes and universities in the country.

== See also ==
- List of astronomical observatories
- Nizamia observatory
