= Jamunamarathur =

- Town
- Location in Tamil Nadu, India
- Coordinates: 12°35′50.3″N 78°53′16.1″E
- Country: India
- State: Tamil Nadu
- District: Tiruvanamalai
- Elevation: 780 m (2,560 ft)

Population (2001)
  - Total: 9,861

Languages
  - Official: Tamil
- Time zone: UTC+5:30 (IST)
- Telephone code: 04181

Jamunamarathur is a hill town and the administrative headquarters of the Jawadhu Hills taluk in the Tiruvannamalai district of the Indian state of Tamil Nadu. Situated atop the Jawadhu Hills massifs, a major range of the Eastern Ghats at an elevation of 857 metres (2,812 ft) above sea level, it is the second-highest altitude settlement in Tiruvannamalai district. Located at the geographical center of the Jawadhu plateau, the town serves as the principal economic, social, and transit hub for over 200 tribal hamlets scattered across the surrounding forest reserves.

Administratively, Jamunamarathur was constituted as a third-grade town panchayat in 1999 and upgraded to a second-grade town panchayat in 2008. The town hosts key regional infrastructure, including the Forest Government Higher Secondary School, one of the oldest state-run educational institutions dedicated to tribal youth welfare. Jamunamarathur links Tiruvannamalai district to Vellore and Tirupattur districts via the Polur and Amirthi mountain routes. In February 2026, the Government of Tamil Nadu launched a ₹103-crore State Highways project to widen the 39-kilometre single-lane forest road connecting Jamunamarathur to Amirthi Zoo into a two-lane highway, significantly improving emergency healthcare transport and trade connectivity for the hill population.

== History ==
=== Antiquity and Archaeology ===
The plateau surrounding Jamunamarathur has a long history of human habitation dating to the Neolithic and Megalithic eras. Archaeological excavations conducted in the surrounding reserve forests have identified stone tools, ancient rock shelters, and megalithic monuments. In March 2024, archaeologists discovered over 100 megalithic burial sites inside the Pattarakadu Reserve Forest at Keel Cheppili and Mel Cheppili villages near Jamunamarathur, confirming continuous prehistoric settlement on the Jawadhu massifs.

Local oral traditions and Sangam literature references (such as in the Pattupattu) associate the Jawadhu Hills with early hill-dwelling communities. During medieval times, the plateau served as a refuge area during regional conflicts involving the Chola dynasty and later the Nawabs of Arcot.

=== Colonial Era ===
During British colonial administration in the 19th century, the Jawadhu Hills were documented in British gazetteers, notably by Henry le Fanu in the 1883 Manual of the Salem District, which detailed the geography, timber resources, and the culture of the indigenous inhabitants. The region became commercially significant for its dense natural reserves of high-grade wild sandalwood (Santalum album).

== Geography and Climate ==
Jamunamarathur is located at coordinates 12°35′50″N 78°53′16″E in the northern interior of Tamil Nadu. The surrounding terrain consists predominantly of bluish-grey granitic massifs interspersed with deep valleys, tropical dry deciduous forest, and scrub vegetation.

The region experiences a highland-influenced tropical climate, with significantly lower temperatures than the adjoining plains of Tiruvannamalai and Vellore. Maximum summer temperatures reach ~38 °C in May, while winter minimums drop to ~12 °C in January. The town receives an average annual rainfall of approximately 880–900 mm, delivered primarily by the South-West and North-East monsoons.

== Demographics and Culture ==
The majority of the population in Jamunamarathur and its surrounding hamlets belongs to the Malayali tribal community (a Scheduled Tribe in Tamil Nadu).

=== Language and Beliefs ===
Tamil is the universal spoken and administrative language. The cultural traditions of the region are deeply tied to ancestral forest deity worship, with prominent festivals dedicated to Mariamman, Kali, Murugan, and Ayyanar celebrated during the Tamil months of Chittirai and Vaikasi.

=== Economy ===
The local economy relies on subsistence agriculture, forest gathering, and weekly commerce:

Sector	Primary Products/Activities
Cultivation	Samai, Ragi, Maize, Paddy, Pulses, and Oilseeds.
Horticulture	Jackfruit, Tamarind, Gooseberry, Mango, and Guava.
Forest Produce	Wild honey, Medicinal herbs, Castor seeds, and Tamarind processing.
Commerce	The weekly Monday market (Santhai) at Jamunamarathur serves as the primary trading venue for over 200 remote hamlets.

== Places of Interest ==
Beemanmadavu Waterfalls: Situated approximately 3.1 miles from Jamunamarathur, this natural waterfall flows through dense forest terrain for nearly eight months of the year, serving as a primary regional tourist spot.

Komutteri Lake: Located near the town center, Komutteri Lake is the largest natural body of water on the Jawadhu plateau, featuring a landscaped perimeter and public boating activities.

Kavalur Vainu Bappu Observatory (VBO): Located nearby at Kavalur, this major astronomical facility operated by the Indian Institute of Astrophysics houses the 2.3-metre Vainu Bappu Telescope and opens to the opens to the public for scheduled stargazing.
