= Javadhu Hills =

Hills Station in Vellore,Tamil Nadu, India

Coordinates: 12°35′N 78°50′E

- Vellore's Ooty

Highest point
- Elevation: 1,350 m (4,430 ft)

Naming
- Native name: ஜவ்வாது மலை (Tamil)
- English translation: Jawadhu Malai

Geography
- Location: Vellore District Tiruvannamalai District and Tirupattur District Nearest City - Vellore
- Parent range: Eastern Ghats

Geology
- Mountain type: Massif Hills

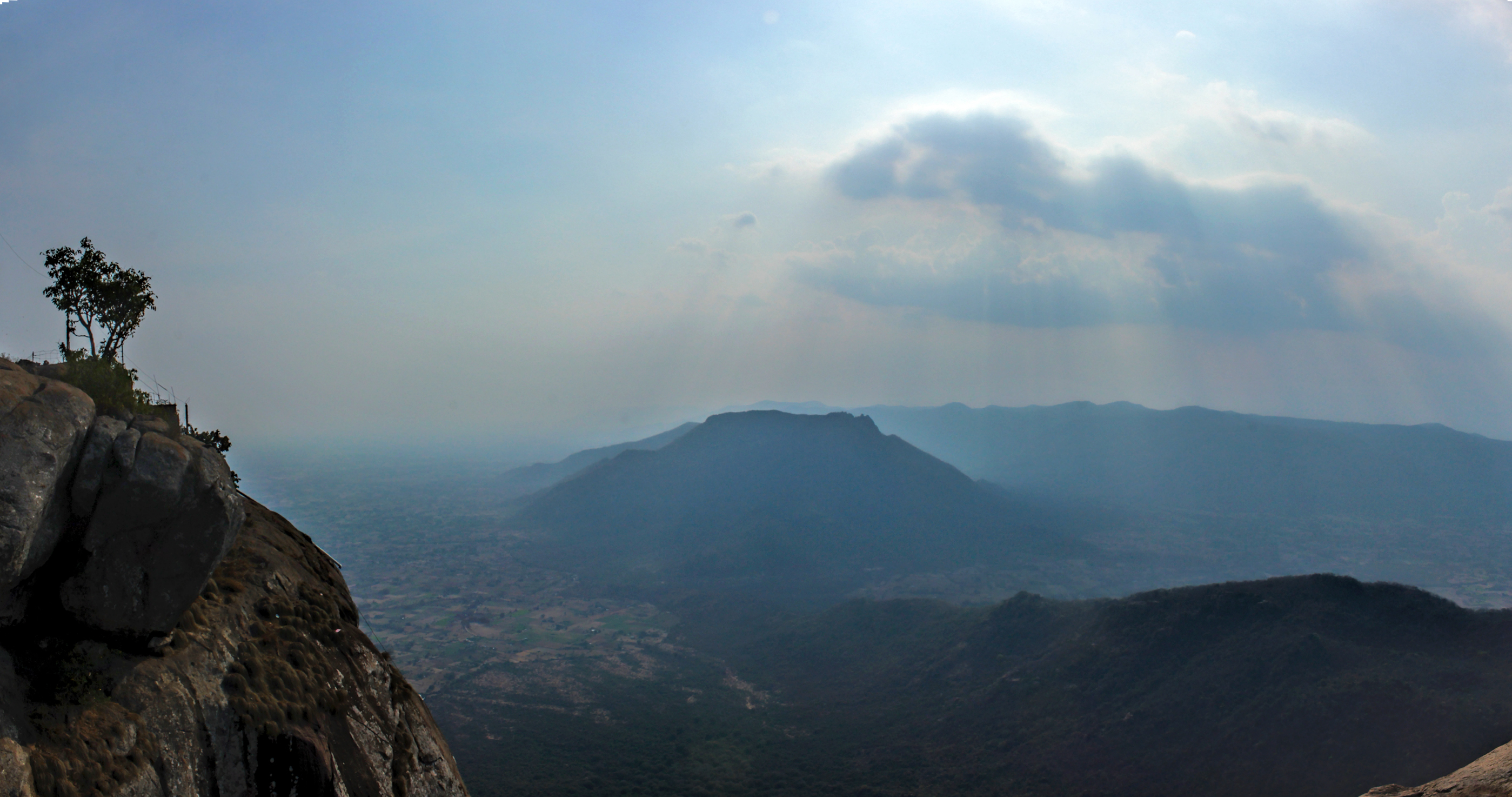
Javadhu Hills as seen from Parvathamalai

The Javadhu Hills (also Javadi Hills, Jawadhu Hills, and Jawadhu Malai) are an extension of the Eastern Ghats spread across parts of Vellore, Tirupattur and Tiruvannamalai districts in the northern part of the state of Tamil Nadu in south-eastern India. The hills separate Vellore, Tirupattur and Tiruvannamalai districts: Tirupattur district, with its towns of Tirupattur, Vaniyambadi and Ambur, lie on the north-western side; Vellore district with the city of Vellore and Amirthi forest are located on the North-eastern side. and Tiruvannamalai district with the towns of Chengam and Polur are located on the south-eastern side. The town of Jamunamarathoor and the Kavalur Observatory are located within.

The hills consist of bluish-grey granites, with peaks averaging 3,800–4,000 feet (1,300–1,350 m). About 50 miles (80 km) wide and 20 miles (32 km) long, they are bisected into eastern and western sections by the Cheyyar and Agaram rivers, tributaries of the Palar. During the British colonisation of India, the Javadhu Hills appeared occasionally in government gazetteers and manuals, ethnographies, and travelers' accounts. Henry le Fanu, writing in 1883, admired the beauty of the Jawadhi hills.

== Cultivation ==
The hills are sparsely populated; the majority of the inhabitants are Malayali tribes people, though other castes are also present.

Malayali tribes people grow a variety of trees on their patta land, including tamarind, jackfruit, gooseberry, guava, pomegranate, mango, lemon, coconut, plantain, Paddy, Saamai etc.

The trees of the Javadhu Hills also produce a range of forest products. These include millettia pinnata, Smilax regelii, Castor oil plant

They are noted both for their fruit bearing trees, medicinal and for their sandalwood. Sandalwood trees remain in the forest and are coming back . One can witness the scent of sandalwood while driving towards jamunamarathu, yet their numbers are dwindling due to illegal logging. This theft was going on for many years.

== Archaeological excavations ==
In March 2024, more than 100 megalithic burials were unearthed inside Pattarakadu Reserve Forest atop Jawadhu Hills. The burials were located in Keel Cheppili and Mel Cheppili villages near Jamunamarathur. This was hailed as a rare and significant find.

Earlier, in 2021, a large number of Neolithic tools had been found in the area also.
