= Devikapuram =

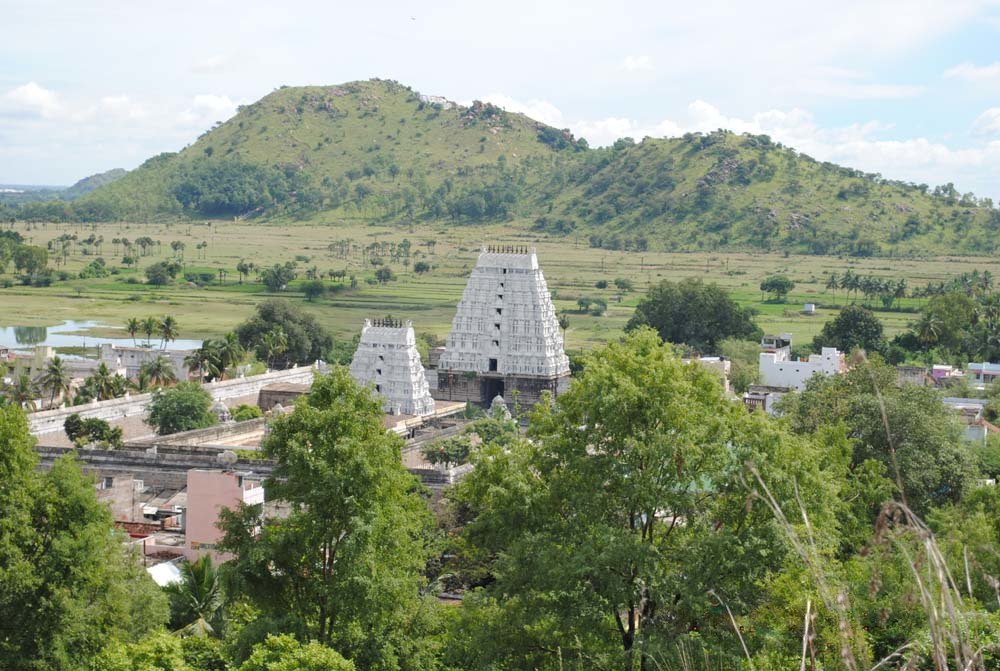
- Temple View from hill
- Nickname: Devikai
- Location in Tamil Nadu, India Devikapuram (India)
- Coordinates: 12.474433°N 79.347539°E
- Country: India
- State: Tamil Nadu
- District: Tiruvannamalai

Government
  - Body: Village Panchayat

Population (2011)
  - Total: 9,800

Languages
  - Official: Tamil
- Time zone: UTC+5:30 (IST)
- Postal code: 606902
- Vehicle registration: TN 97
- Sex ratio: 1:1 ♂/♀
- Website: http://www.devikapuram.in/

Devikapuram viewed from Hill

Devikapuram, also called Devikeezpuram, is a town and a Panchayat board in Tiruvannamalai district, located in Tamil Nadu, India, 45 kilometres from the city of Tiruvannamalai, also the district headquarters.

== Landmarks ==
- Periyanayagi Amman Temple
- Ponmalai Nathar Temple, aka Kanagagireeswar

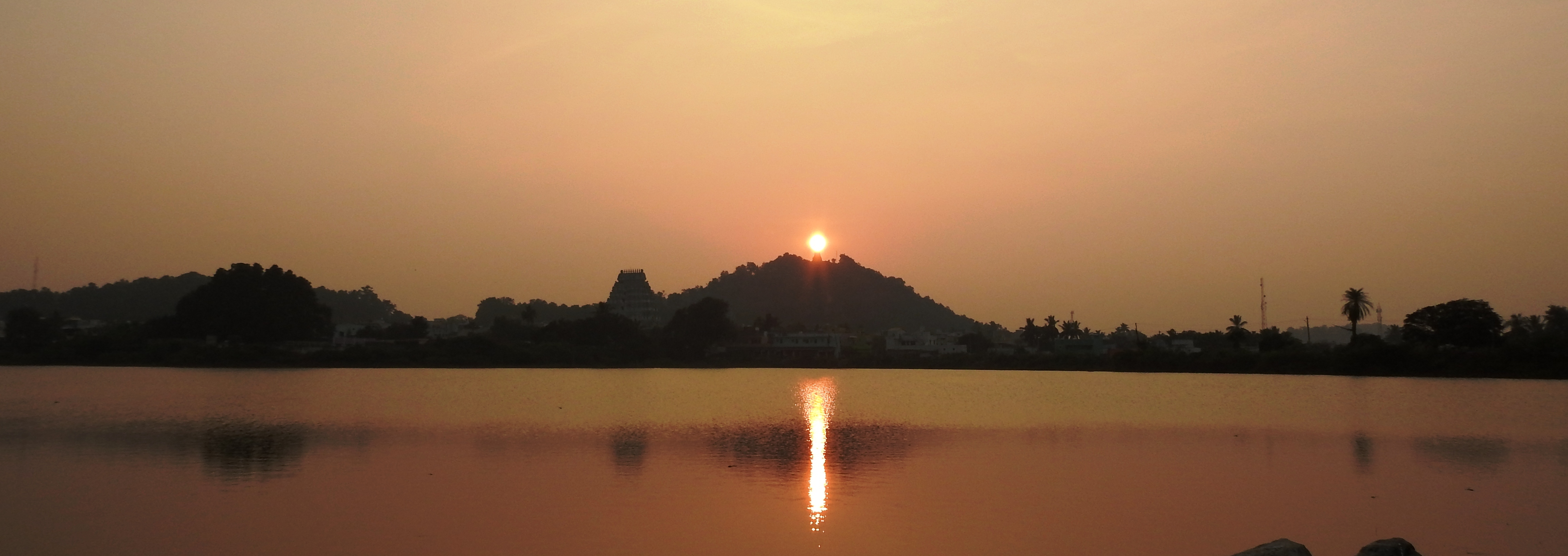
Devikapuram-sunset3
