= Vandavasi =

- Town
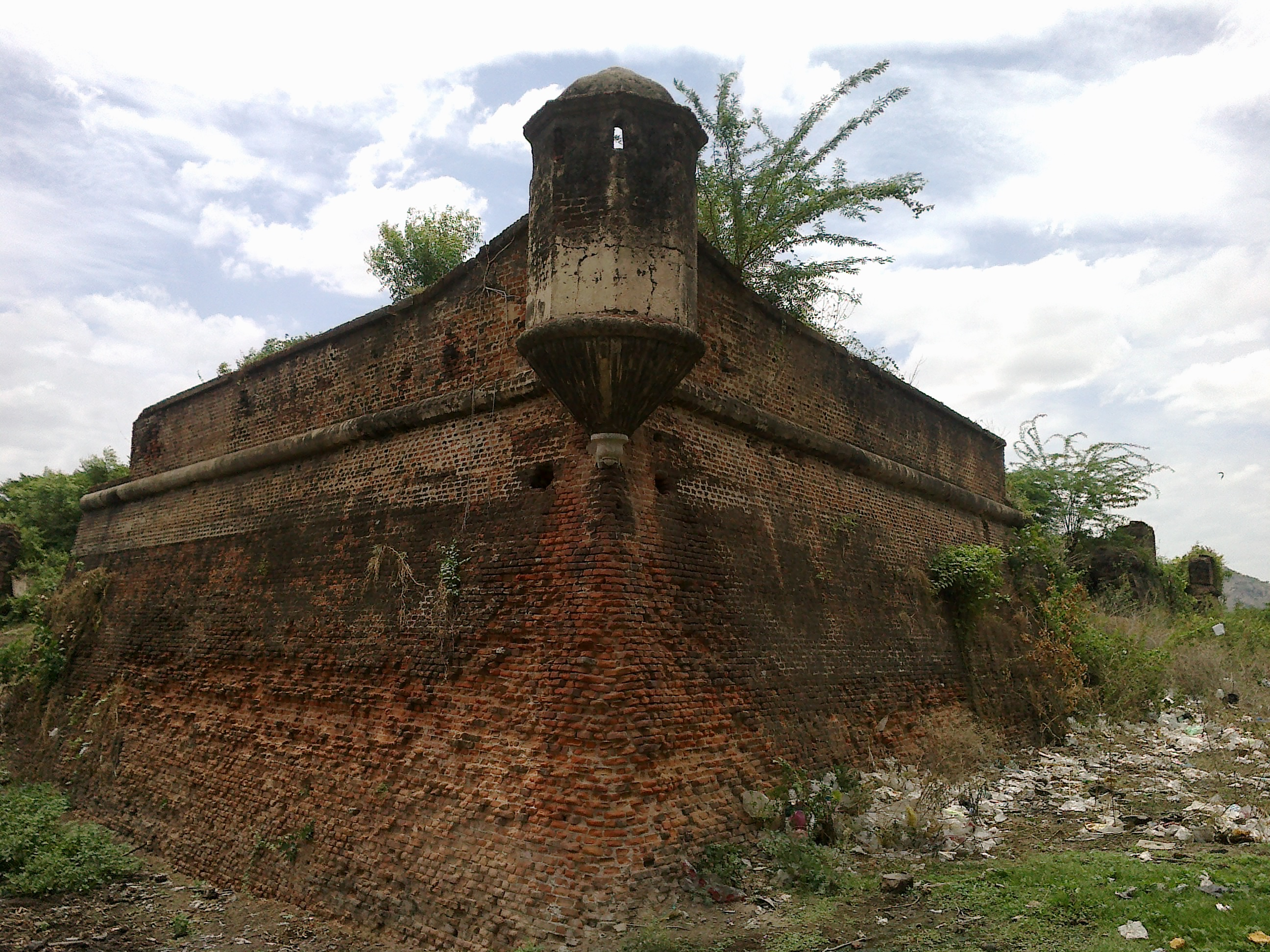
- Vandavasi Fort

- Location in Tamil Nadu, India
- Coordinates: 12.5°N 79.62°E
- Country: India
- State: Tamil Nadu
- District: Tiruvannamalai
- Elevation: 74 m (243 ft)

Population (2011)
  - Total: 31,320

Languages
  - Official: Tamil
- Time zone: UTC+5:30 (IST)
- PIN: 604408

Vandavasi (formerly anglicised as Wandiwash) is a town in the Tiruvannamalai district of the Indian state of Tamil Nadu. The town is well known in the Carnatic history for the Battle of Wandiwash. Vandavasi town is also the largest manufacturer of kora artefacts including mats, shawls and vessels. As of 2011, the town had a population 31,320.

Wandiwash was the site of a decisive battle in the 18th century Carnatic Wars between France and the British Empire for control over south Asia. The Battle of Wandiwash was a watershed moment in Indian history as it cemented British supremacy in India. On 22 January 1760, a British force led by Eyre Coote defeated a French force led by General Thomas Lally.

== Geography and climate ==
Vandavasi is located on the state highway SH5 that connects Tindivanam and Arcot. It lies 110 km southwest of state capital Chennai, 40 km south of the temple city of Kanchipuram, 80 km northeast of Thiruvannamalai, 42 km southeast of Arani & 80 km from Vellore. It is situated at an average elevation of 74 metres (242 feet) above sea level.Vandavasi's climatic condition is similar to that of Chennai, lying on the thermal equator and close to the coast, while most of the year the climate is hot and humid.

== Demographics ==
Religious census
Religion	Percent(%)
Hindu	60.86%
Muslim	34.73%
Christian	3.03%
Jain	1.28%
Sikh	0.02%
Other	0.08%

As of the 2011 census, Vandavasi had a population of 74,320 with a sex-ratio of 1,012 females for every 1,000 males, far above the national average of 929 females per 1,000 males. A total of 3,337 were under the age of six, constituting 1,740 males and 1,597 females. Scheduled Castes and Scheduled Tribes accounted for 13.54% and 1.31% of the population respectively. The average literacy rate was 77.3%, compared to the national average of 72.99%. The town had a total of 7326 households. There were a total of 10,553 workers, comprising 152 cultivators, 302 main agricultural labourers, 309 in household industries, 9,093 other workers, 697 marginal workers, 8 marginal cultivators, 27 marginal agricultural labourers, 52 marginal workers in household industries and 610 other marginal workers. As per the religious census of 2011, Vandavasi's population was 60.86% Hindu, 34.73% Muslim, 3.03% Christian, 1.28% Jain, 0.02% Sikh, and 0% Buddhist, with 0.08% following other religions and 0% following no religion or not indicating any religious preference.

== Places of interest ==
Vandavasi Fort is an important landmark in Vandavasi, which witnessed the decisive Battle of Wandiwash. The Nayak of Vandavasi, a vassal of the Vijaynagar Empire, was instrumental in helping the British secure a land grant for Chandragiri Fort on which to build the city of Madras (modern day Chennai).

Arahanthgiri Jain Math is a Jain matha that was established at the ancient Jain site of Tiruvannamalai in August 1998. The complex includes 3 Jain caves, 4 Jain temples and a 16-meter high sculpture of Neminatha thought to be from the 12th century, that is the tallest Jain image in Tamil Nadu. Sri Thavalagiriswarar Temple is a notable temple located atop the Vengundram hill.

== Politics ==
Vandavasi was a Lok Sabha constituency till a delimitation in 2009. It is now part of Vandavasi state assembly constituency and Arani Lok Sabha constituency.

== See also ==
- Kandiyanallur
- Battle of Wandiwash
