= Arani, Tiruvannamalai =

Aarani
- Town
- Arani
- Aarani, Tamil Nadu Aarani (India)
- Coordinates: 12.671300°N 79.281800°E
- country: India
- State: Tamilnadu
- District: Thiruvannamalai
- Region: Tondai Nadu
- Established: c. 1st millennium CE
- Named for: Silk & Rice

Government
  - Lok Sabha constituency: Aarani (Lok Sabha constituency)
  - Member of Lok Sabha constituency: M. S. Tharaniventhan
  - Member of Legislative Assembly: L. Jayasudha
  - District Collector: Tmt. Vandana Garg IAS
  - Municipal Leader: A.C. Mani

Area
  - Town: 13.64 km^{2} (5.27 sq mi)
  - Rank: selection grade municipality
- Elevation: 171 m (561 ft)

Population (2011)
  - Town: 63,671
  - Rank: 30
  - Metro: 92,375

Language
  - Official language: Tamil
- Time zone: UTC+5:30 (Indian tuning time)
- Postal code: 632301, 632314, 632316, 632317, 632318
- Phone numbers in India: 04173
- Vehicle registration: TN 97
- Website: Arani Municipality

Aarani, officially spelled as Aranee, Arani or Arni, and also known as Periya Aarani, is a town and major commercial, industrial and cultural hub and also a divisional headquarter in the Thiruvanamalai district of Tamil Nadu, India.

== History ==
Pallavas were the first to rule Aarani and were followed by Rashtrakutas in 968. The Chola period, including the reigns of Kulothunga Chola II (1070–1122) and Rajadhiraja Chola II (1166–1178), witnessed more developments in administration including formation of feudatories. Inscriptions also reveal several grants and donations made by Cholas to temples in the form of villages.

In 1640 Jagir of Aarani was granted to Vedaji Bhaskar Pant, a Marathi Brahmin. The Jagir was continuously headed by the descendants of Bhaskar Pant till the Zamindari Abolition Bill was passed in 1948.

=== Fort ===
There is a fort area in the heart of the town. It houses the forest department, sub jail, registration office, police station, women's police station, and agricultural office.

A monument situated in the parade ground of the fort commemorates Col. Robert Kelly, who was surveying the Aarani area. Kelly was killed in a duel on 29 September 1790 by his junior officer Capt. Urban Vigors, who in his chagrin erected the monument.

=== Battle of Aarani ===
The Battle of Arnee (or Battle of Aarani) took place at Aarani on 3 December 1751 during the Second Carnatic War. A British-led force under the command of Robert Clive defeated and routed a much larger Franco-Indian force under the command of Raza Sahib. The French troops were guarding a convoy of treasure. Clive took up a position in swampy ground, crossed by a causeway in which the convoy was forced to pass. The French were thrown into disorder and forced to retreat, but night saved them from total destruction. The treasure, however, was captured.

=== After independence ===
Aarani was constituted as a third-grade municipality in the year 1951. As per G.O. No. 564, on 2 February 1951, it was classified as Second Grade Municipality. The population of the town was then 24,567 people. The entire area of Aarani Revenue village was included within the jurisdiction of the municipality. As of 2007 from 9 May 1983 onwards, as per G.O. No. 851 Aarani is classified as first grade municipality. The population of the town was then 63,741 people. From 2008 onwards as per G.O No- 1067, Classified as Selection Grade Municipality, the population of the town was then 92,375 people.

== Geography ==
Arni is located at 12.67°N 79.28°E on the banks of the Kamandala Naaga river. It has an average elevation of 151 metres (495 ft).

== Demographics ==
Religious census
Religion	Percent(%)
Hindu	89.16%
Muslim	7.30%
Christian	1.8%
Sikh	0.01%
Buddhist	0.01%
Jain	1.43%
Other	0.19%
No religion	0.0%

Linguistic census
Linguistic groups	Percent(%)
Tamil	71.57%
Telugu	13.07%
Urdu	12.39%
Kannada	1.01%
Creole	0.4%
Other	0.51%

According to 2011 census, Arni town with 33 wards had a population of 63,671 with a sex-ratio of 1,036 females for every 1,000 males, much above the national average of 929, but extended town including all the sub urban area had a population of 92,375. A total of 6,346 people were under the age of six, constituting 3,200 males and 3,146 females. The average literacy of the town was 76.9%, compared to the national average of 72.99%. The town had a total of 14889 households. There were a total of 23,298 workers, comprising 153 cultivators, 343 main agricultural labourers, 2,185 in household industries, 17,919 other workers, 2,698 marginal workers, 33 marginal cultivators, 100 marginal agricultural labourers, 224 marginal workers in household industries and 2,341 other marginal workers. As per the religious census of 2011, Aarani (M) had 89.16% Hindus, 7.39% Muslims, 1.8% Christians, 0.01% Sikhs, 0.01% Buddhists, 1.43% Jains, 0.19% following other religions and 0.0% following no religion or did not indicate any religious preference.

Historical population
Year	Pop.	±%
1901	9,299	—
1911	13,394	+44.0%
1921	14,286	+6.7%
1931	17,446	+22.1%
1941	19,668	+12.7%
1951	24,567	+24.9%
1961	31,351	+27.6%
1981	38,668	+23.3%
1991	54,881	+41.9%
2001	60,888	+10.9%
2011	92,375	+51.7%
Sources: 1951 – 2001; 2001; 2011

== Administration and politics ==
Municipality officials
Chairman	AC Mani
Commissioner
Vice-chairman	Paari babu
Elected members
Member of Legislative Assembly	L. JAYASUDHA AIADMK
Member of Parliament	M.S THARANIVENDHAN DMK

=== Regional Transport Office ===
Aarani is the newly created regional transport office in Thiruvannamalai district. Until 2018, the Thiruvannamalai code was operated by TN 25 as the Sub Transport Office. Subsequently, with the efforts of the Minister of Hindu Religious Affairs, Sevoor Ramachandran, created a new Regional Transport Office code, TN 97. The headquarters of the Regional Transport Office is Aarani. It consists of the taluks of Aarani, Polur, Chetpet, Jamunamarattur, Cheyyar, Vembakkam, Vandavasi and Kalasapakkam.

=== Revenue division ===
Aarani revenue code is a newly developed district in Thiruvannamalai district. The Revenue Division was funded by the efforts of the Hindu Religious Affairs Minister, Mr Sevur Ramachandran. It was opened in April 2016 by Palanisamy.

== Economy ==
Major revenue is generated from certain businessss: rice production and silk saree weaving. There are more than 300 rice mills to produce rice called "Arni Ponni" from paddies. The town also has a large communities of silk weavers who specialise in making silk sarees. Hand looms are most frequently used for weaving, although recently some have turned to mechanised methods such as power looms. Aarani is the town with the most revenue in Tiruvannamalai District. Though the town is not well known outside Tamil Nadu, a large quantity of India's silk apparels is produced by the people of Aarani.
