= Chetpet =

Neighbourhood in Tiruvannamalai district, Tamil Nadu, India

Chetpet Chetpet
- Town
- Location in Tamil Nadu, India
- Coordinates: 12.464433°N 79.347539°E
- Country: India
- State: Tamil Nadu
- District: Tiruvannamalai

Population (2011)
  - Total: 44,387

Languages
  - Official: Tamil
- Time zone: UTC+5:30 (IST)
- PIN: 606 801
- Telephone code: 91 4181
- Vehicle registration: TN97
- Sex ratio: 1:1 ♂/♀

Chetpet is a major town panchayat in Tiruvannamalai district in the state of Tamil Nadu, India. Chetpet's major economical activity is processing paddy and the town is home to one of the largest organised paddy exchange markets of the state. Chetpet is one of the very few places of German colonisation in Indian history. A village called Nedungunam nearby has one of the Famous temples of Lord Rama. The temple is very famous and called Sri Yoga Rama temple.

== History ==
From 2015 Chetpet became a Taluk under Tiruvannamalai District, Tamil Nadu.

== Demographics ==
Chetpet has a population of 94,387, consisting of 47,272 males and 47,115 females, with 10.83% of the population being under the age of 6 years. The town has a literacy rate of about 69%, which is 10% higher than the national average; male literacy is 77% and female literacy is 61%.

Chetpet is a Selection Grade Town Panchayat, a small town under 20,000 or 25,000 inhabitants, in the district of Tiruvannamalai in the state of Tamil Nadu, India.

== Economy ==
More than 80% of its inhabitants are farmers, and the primary source of income is agriculture.

The town's main crops are groundnut, paddy and sugarcane. Chetput is a fast developing town, ranking with panchayats of Pazhampet and Kannanur. Animal husbandry provides subsidiary income to farmers in the region. A veterinary dispensary established in 1963 provides services to the farmers.

The STD code for Chetpet is 04181. Its pincode number is 606801.

== Education ==
Schools:

- Dhivya Matriculation Higher Secondary School
- Government Higher Secondary School
- Panchayat Union Primary School
- St. Dominic Savio Higher Secondary School
- St. Anne Higher Secondary School
- Dhivya High School
- Danie Matriculation High School
- Smart Kids Play School
- Masabiel English School

Colleges:

- Dhivya College of Education
- Dhivya Arts and Science College
- Dhivya Polytechnic College
- Dhivya Teacher Training Institute
- Dr Maria Aschhoff School of Nursing

== Adjacent communities ==
Its neighboring towns are Vandavasi (east), Polur (west), Gingee (south), Tiruvannamalai (southwest) and Arani (north).

== Religion and Culture ==
In the outskirts of Chettupattu town there is a Christian chapel on the hill called Madha hill chapel. This hill shrine has a grotto which is an exact replica of the Grotto found in the town of Lourdes, France. This hill shrine contains lots of attractions such as stations on the cross, Adoration chapel, A small park near the sacred sprint and a huge prayer hall. Girivalam is a pious pilgrimage undertaken by the devotees around the holy hill with chants on every full moon day.

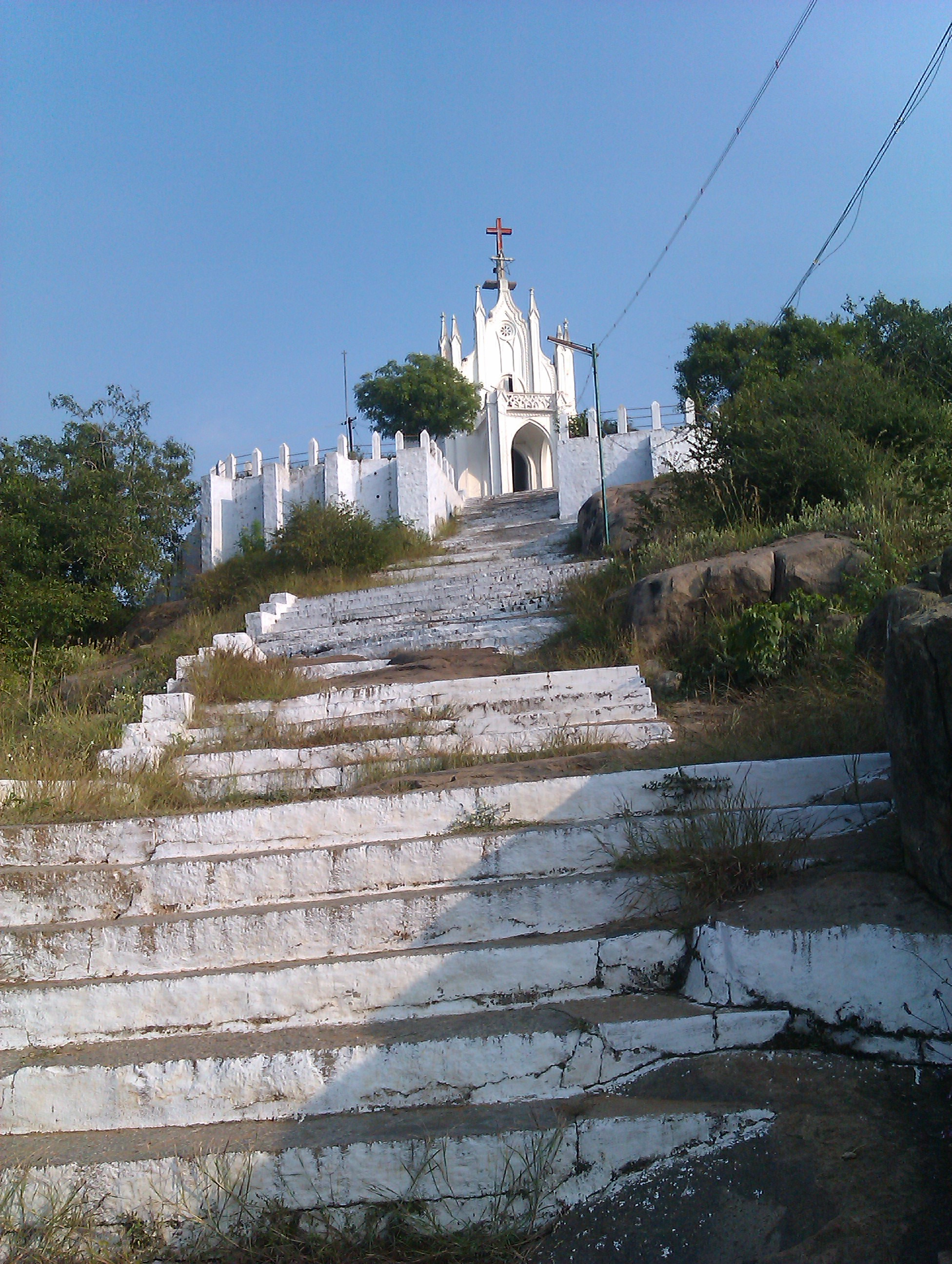
Chetpet Madha hill chapel

== See also ==
- Cheyyar
