= Polur =

Market town in Tiruvannamalai, Tamil Nadu, India

- Town
- Nickname: gateway of Eastern ghats
- Location in Tamil Nadu, India
- Coordinates: 12°30′43″N 79°07′33″E
- Country: India
- State: Tamil Nadu
- District: Tiruvannamalai
- Elevation: 171 m (561 ft)

Population (2011)
  - Total: 55,000
  - Density: 2,500/km^{2} (6,500/sq mi)

Languages
  - Official: Tamil
- Time zone: UTC+5:30 (IST)
- PIN: 606803
- Telephone code: 04181
- Vehicle registration: TN 97
- Body: Municipality

Polur is a scenic town and a Religious site for Lord Narasimha called Sampathgiri, divisional headquarters and a market center in Tiruvannamalai district of Tamil Nadu in India. Located at the foothills of Javvadhi hills, a popular section of Eastern Ghats, Polur is often regarded as Gateway of Eastern ghats. Polur was once an eminent center of Tamil Jainism. The town is home to Dharani sugars, chemicals and fertiliser Pvt., Ltd, and number of agro based industries including coir industries. The famous Chittoor - Cuddalore road (C.C. Road) passes through the town. The town is located 29 Kilometres north of city of Tiruvannamalai and 45 kilometres south of Vellore Metropolis.

== Geography ==
Polur is located at 12.5°N 79.13°E. It has an average elevation of 171 metres (561 ft).

Along with many places of worship, Polur has a huge mountain temple dedicated to Lord Narasimha. This mountain temple was historically referred to as Sampathgiri, which in Sanskrit means "mountain of wealth". From the top of the hill, one can have a clear view of the Tiruvannamalai Arunachala Hill. A small hill named Kunnathur Hill is also seen on the outskirts of Polur. The same term was referred to in Tamil as "Porulur", literally translating to Porul oor (place of wealth), now referred to as Polur. It is situated in the Tiruvannamalai District, it takes around 30 minutes to reach the Tiruvannamalai and Silk City of Arani. It takes about 1 hour to reach Vellore.

== Demographics ==
=== Population ===
As of 2001 India census, Polur had a population of 43,492. Males constituted 49% of the population and females 51%. Polur had an average literacy rate of 72%, higher than the national average of 59.5%: male literacy was 79%, and female literacy was 65%. In Polur, 11% of the population were under 6 years of age.

Historical population
Year	Pop.	±%
1901	9,767	—
1911	9,946	+1.8%
1921	12,330	+24.0%
1931	13,098	+6.2%
1941	13,967	+6.6%
1951	15,212	+8.9%
1961	16,441	+8.1%
1981	23,462	+42.7%
1991	30,196	+28.7%
2001	41,376	+37.0%
2011	55,278	+33.6%
Sources: 1951 – 2001; 2011

== Transport ==
The nearest Village is Kelur which is situated on the Vellore-Thirvannamalai Highway.

The town is about 193 km from Chennai and there are frequent buses (TNSTC - Villupuram) from the Chennai Mofussil Bus Terminus CMBT, plying on Route # 148 (Chennai - Polur) via Tambaram, Chengalepat, Utthiramerur, Vandavasi, Chetpet. The nearest airport is at Chennai.

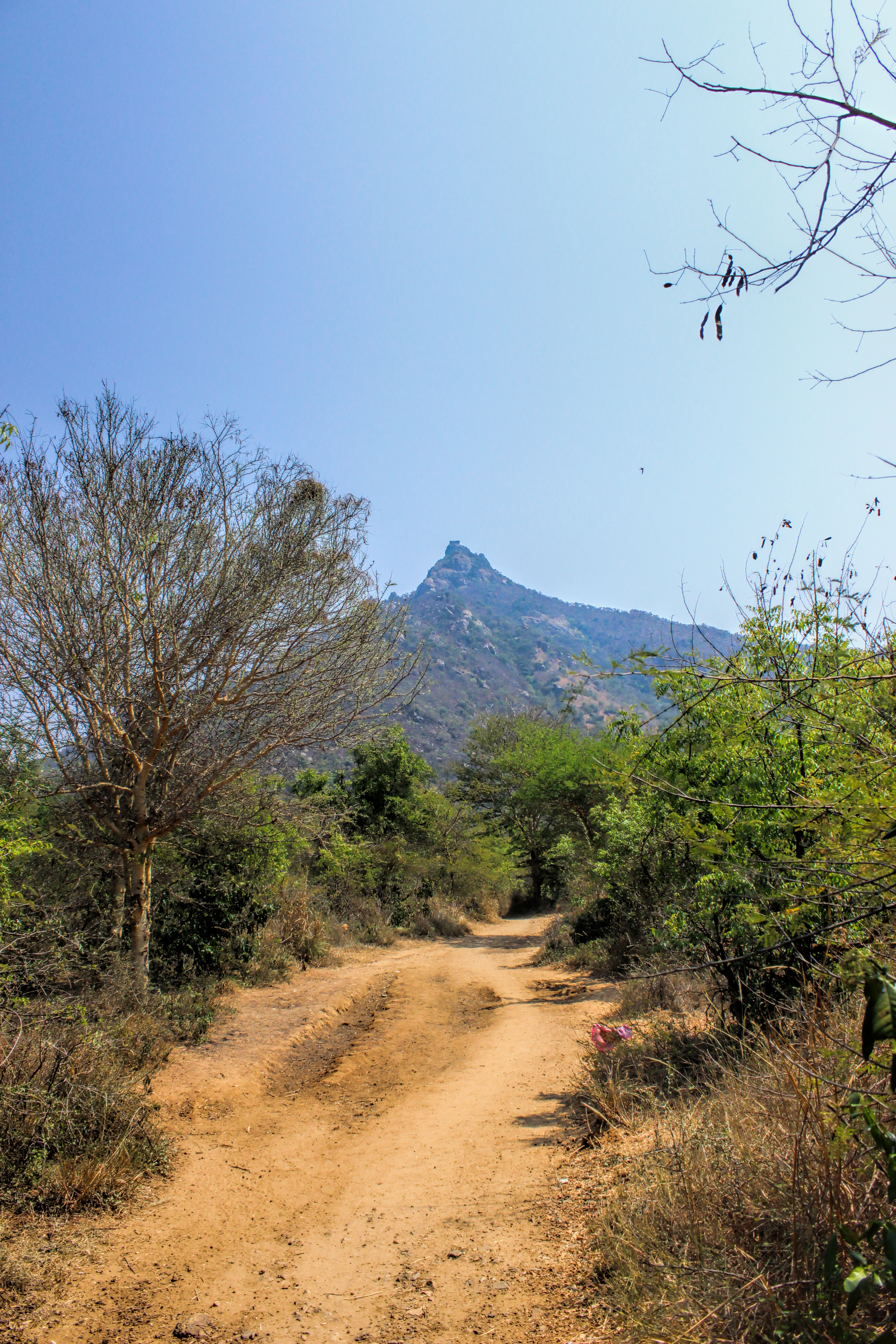
Parvathamalai as seen from the foothills

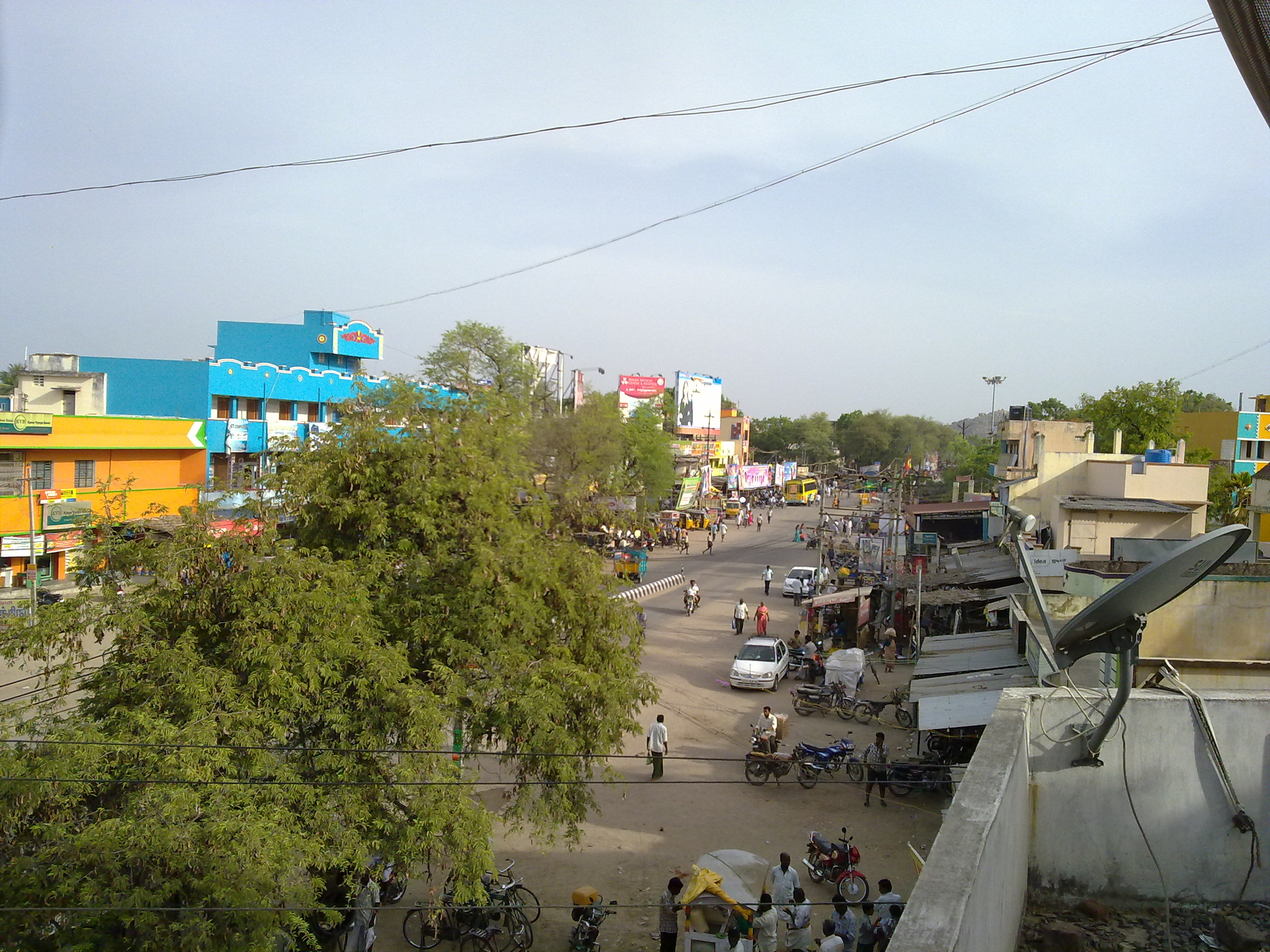
Polur Road overview

The remote village Sothukanni is 8 km east of Polur. It is famous for Kanum Pongal.

Kalambur town is 17 km away and is famous for rice production.

Polur Railway Station is on the Vellore-Thiruvannamalai rail route. The station is served by the Southern Railway. The station is located about 35 km from Thiruvannamalai. Going north, Vellore Cantonment Railway Station is the main station next to Polur. Traveling south, Thiruvannamalai Railway Station is the nearest major station.

The original name (with diacritics) of the town is Polūr.

Airports nearest to Polur are sorted by the distance to the airport from the city centre.

- Vellore Airport (45 km)
- Pondicherry Airport (94 km)
- Neyveli Airfield (110 km)
- Tambaram Airfield (120 km)
- Chennai International Airport (130 km)

== Arahanthgiri Jain Math ==
Arahanthgiri Jain Math is a Jain Math that was established at the ancient Jain site of Tiruvannaamalai in August 1998. The complex includes three Jain caves, four Jain temples and a 16 meter high sculpture of Neminatha thought to date from the 12th century that is the tallest Jain image in Tamil Nadu.
