= Transport in Tiruvannamalai =

Tiruvannamalai is predominantly connected by road to other major cities in the state including Chennai, Bengaluru, Vellore, Arani, Trichy, Tiruppur, Salem, Thanjavur, Coimbatore, Shimoga and Kanchipuram. And also other state major cities such as Hyderabad, Tirupati, Puducherry and Mangaluru. Tiruvannamalai serves as one of the important Road junction of Tamil Nadu and north roadways Zone. The nearest domestic airport is Vellore, which has a no daily chartered flights. The nearest international airports are Chennai and Tiruchirappalli.

== Road ==
Tiruvannamalai is well connected by roads to major cities and to the rest of the state. The major national highways of the town are:

- NH 66, which connects Bengaluru to Puducherry, via Krishnagiri - Uthangarai - Chengam - Tiruvannamalai - Pennathur - Gingee - Tindivanam.
- NH 234, which Connects Puducherry to Mangaluru via Thiruvannamalai - Vellore - Gudiyatham.
- NH 234A, which connects (Chittore) Tiruvannamalai to Cuddalore via vellore - Polur - kalasapakkam - Tiruvannamalai -Tirukoilur - Panruti and intersects with NH 45 in Madapet, about 20 km from Tirucoilur.

Besides the above-mentioned national highways, several state highways also run through the district and town.

The town has a lot of buses frequently to major cities such as Chennai, Vellore, Bengaluru, Kanchipuram, Salem, Puducherry, Coimbatore, Kallakurichi and Sankarapuram etc., The town also serves the frequent bus services to towns like Cuddalore, Villupuram, Tindivanam, Tirupattur etc.

Tiruvannamalai is also the Divisional headquarters of the Tamil Nadu State Transport Corporation(TNSTC) - Tiruvannamalai Division(the erstwhile Pattukottai azhagiri Transport Corporation [PATC]). It is one of the six Tamil Nadu State Transport Corporation divisions serving the state.

=== Bus Stand ===
Tiruvannamalai has one central bus stand named Tiruvannamalai Central Bus Station and 9 arterial bus stands. Tiruvannamalai Central Bus Station services the mofussil buses and SETC premium buses to major cities and towns. It is one of the largest bus terminus by area in Tamil Nadu. Arterial bus stands is used for local town buses and Festive time temporary stations which has been operated by the TNSTC, Tiruvannamalai division.

== Rail ==
Tiruannamalai has a well-known railway station in the spiritual history. It was first built under the British. Bhavagan sri Ramana maharishi came to Tiruvannamalai by train and never left Tiruvannamalai after .

== Air ==
The nearest airport is Vellore Airport and Puducherry airport, in Puducherry, approximately 80 kilometres (50 mi) from Tiruvannamalai. Puducherry is now connected by Air India Regional with an ATR aircraft service six times a week except Wednesday. This is an afternoon service departing from Bengaluru and returning in the evening to Bengaluru.

The nearest major airport is Chennai International Airport (MAA), approximately 147 kilometres (91 mi) from the town; the next closest major airport is Bengaluru International Airport, approximately 180 kilometres (110 mi) away.
