= Melravanthavadi =

Village in Tamil Nadu, India

Melravanthavadi Mela ravanthavadi
- Village Panchayat
- Location in Tamil Nadu, India Melravanthavadi (India)
- Coordinates: 12.742433°N 79.499802°E
- Country: India
- State: Tamil Nadu
- District: Thiruvannamalai

Population (2011)
  - Total: 2,354

Languages
  - Official: Tamil
- Time zone: UTC+5:30 (IST)

Melravanthavadi is a village and Gram Panchayat located in Chengam district in the larger Tiruvannamalai district of Tamil Nadu, India.

This panchayat falls under Chengam Assembly Constituency and Thiruvannamalai Lok Sabha constituency. This panchayat has a total of seven panchayat constituencies. Seven Panchayat Council members are elected from these. According to the 2011 India Census, the total population is 2354. Among them are 1170 females and 1184 males.

== Basic facilities ==
The following information has been compiled according to the 2015 data of the Tamil Nadu Rural Development and Panchayat Department.

Basic Facilities	Total No.
Water Connections	316
Bore Motor Pump water connections	3
Hand Pump	14
Upper tank Water storage	7
Bottom tank water storage	
Local government buildings	14
Local School Buildings	4
Ponds or Bore Wells	7
Play Ground	
Market	
Panchayat Union Roads	13
Paanchayat Roads	21
Bustand	
Graveyard	5

== Villages ==
List of villages located in this panchayat:

1. Old Kondam
2. Chettithangal
3. Irular Colony
4. Nadarapattu
5. Ramapuram
6. Mel rawanthawadi
7. Melakarachi Kuttai
