= Tiruvannamalai Central Bus Station =

Bus station in Tamil Nadu, India

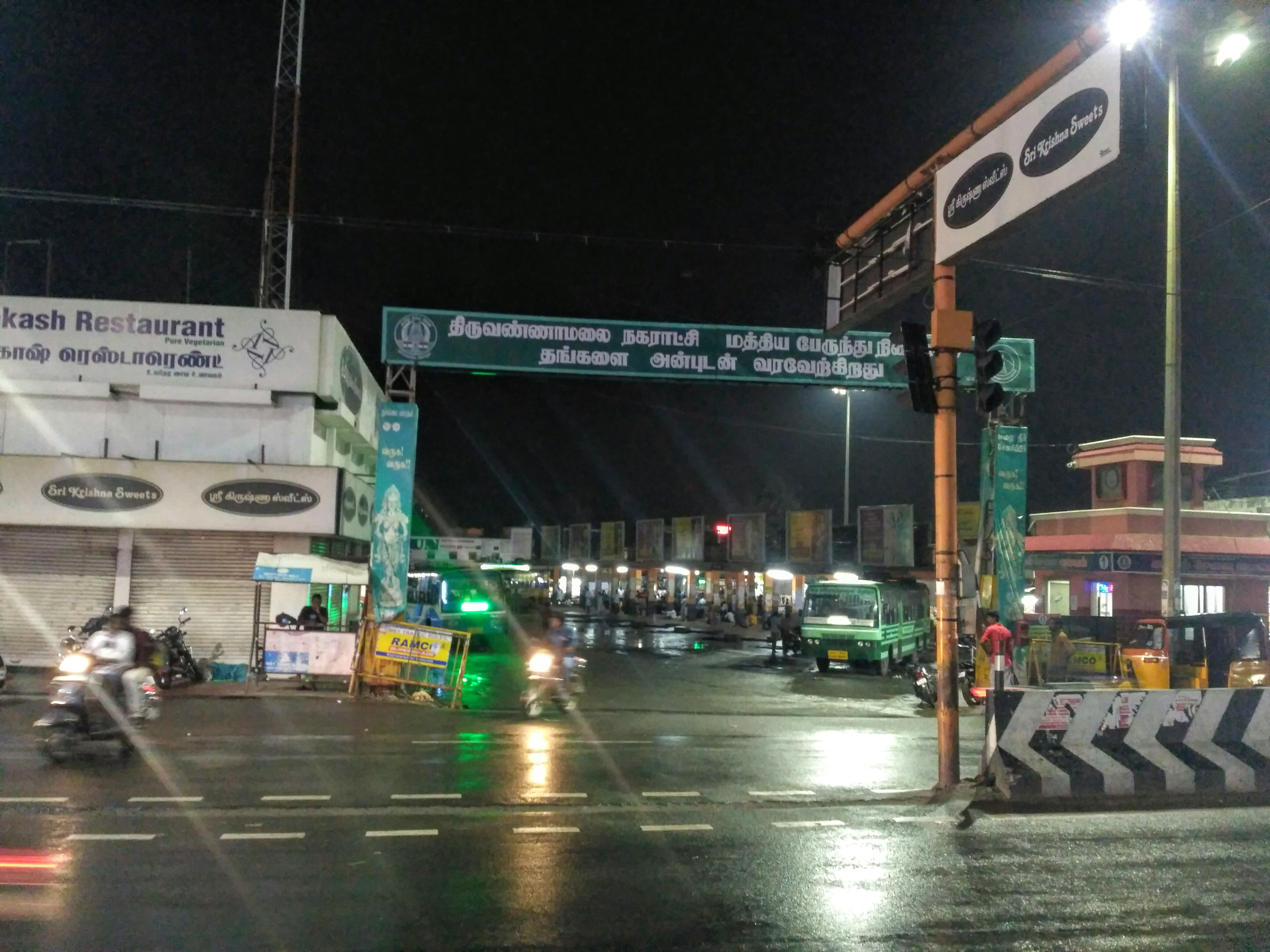

General information
- Location: Vellore road (Chittore-Cuddalore road), Tiruvannamalai, Tamil Nadu. PIN – 606601. India
- Coordinates: 12.2398099°N 79.0731603°E
- Owner: Tiruvannamalai Municipal Corporation
- Operator: Department of Transport (Tamil Nadu)
- Platforms: 4 (60 Bays)

Construction
- Parking: Yes
- Cycle facilities: Yes
- Accessible: Disabled access

Other information
- Fare zone: TNSTC Tiruvannamalai Division

History
- Opened: 2000
- Closed: 13.07.2026

Passengers
- 3,00,000 per day
Location

Tiruvannamalai Central Bus Station, commonly known as Tiruvannamalai New Bus Stand, is one of the bus terminus of Tiruvannamalai. Sister stations include Manalurpet road station and nine other arterial festive time bus stations, which are primarily used for intra-city buses. The bus station is located 0.5 kilometres (0.31 mi) away from Tiruvannamalai railway station. The Shri Tiruvannamalai Arunamalaiyar – Abithagujalaambal shrine is 2 km (1.2 mi) away.

== Services ==
Due to the town's location between Bengaluru and Puducherry & Vellore and Trichy, all Bengaluru bound buses from Villupuram, Cuddalore, Kumbakonam and Thanjavur pass the terminus. The station is managed by Department of Transport (Tamil Nadu). It services premium buses, which are operated by SETC.

=== Beyond Tamil Nadu ===
Tiruvannamalai is also serviced by Karnataka and Andhra Pradesh government transport corporations. Karnataka State Road Transport Corporation's Rajahamsa, Airavat and Airavat club class buses and other vehicles connect Tiruvannamalai with rest of Karnataka.

Andhra Pradesh State Road Transport Corporation connects Tiruvannamalai with Tirupathi and Hyderabad.

== Connections ==
Platform	Destinations
1	Vellore, Chittoor, Tirupati, Kanchipuram, Chennai Koyambedu via - Vandavasi, Arni, Chetpet, Vandavasi, Melmalayanur, Arcot, Tiruthani, and Sholinghur
1 A	Kilambakkam, Adyar, Madhavaram, Gingee, Tindivanam, Melmaruvathur, Chengalpattu, and Puducherry
2	Bengaluru, Dharmapuri, Harur, Tirupattur, Vaniyambadi, Karur, Ooty, Hosur, Hogenakkal, Salem, Coimbatore, Erode and Tiruppur, Krishnagiri, Uthangarai
3	KSRTC - Bengaluru, Kolar Gold Fields, Chickmagalur, Davanagere, Shimoga, Hospet and Talguppa. APSRTC – Hyderabad, Tirupathi, Madanapalle, Gooty, Guntakal, Proddatur and Palamaner
4	Cuddalore, Trichy, Madurai, Nagapattinam, Chidambaram, Mayiladuthurai, Kumbakonam, Thanjavur, Tirunelveli, Karaikudi, Dindigul Pudukottai, Nagercoil, Shencottah, Rajapalayam and Marthandam
4 sub	Kallakurichi, Attur, Rasipuram and Town buses.

== Platforms and Busbays ==
Platform	Busbay	Destina
1	7	Arni
1	8	Arni / Arcot
1	9	Arcot
1	10	Kanchipuram/Tiruthani
1	11	K.G.F / Gudiyattam
1	12	Other destinations- exit via Polur/ Avalurpet roads
1	13/14/15	Town Buses – Medical college, Avalurpet, Collector office, Vengikkal EB etc.,
