= Adi Annamalai =

Adhi Annamalai
- suburb
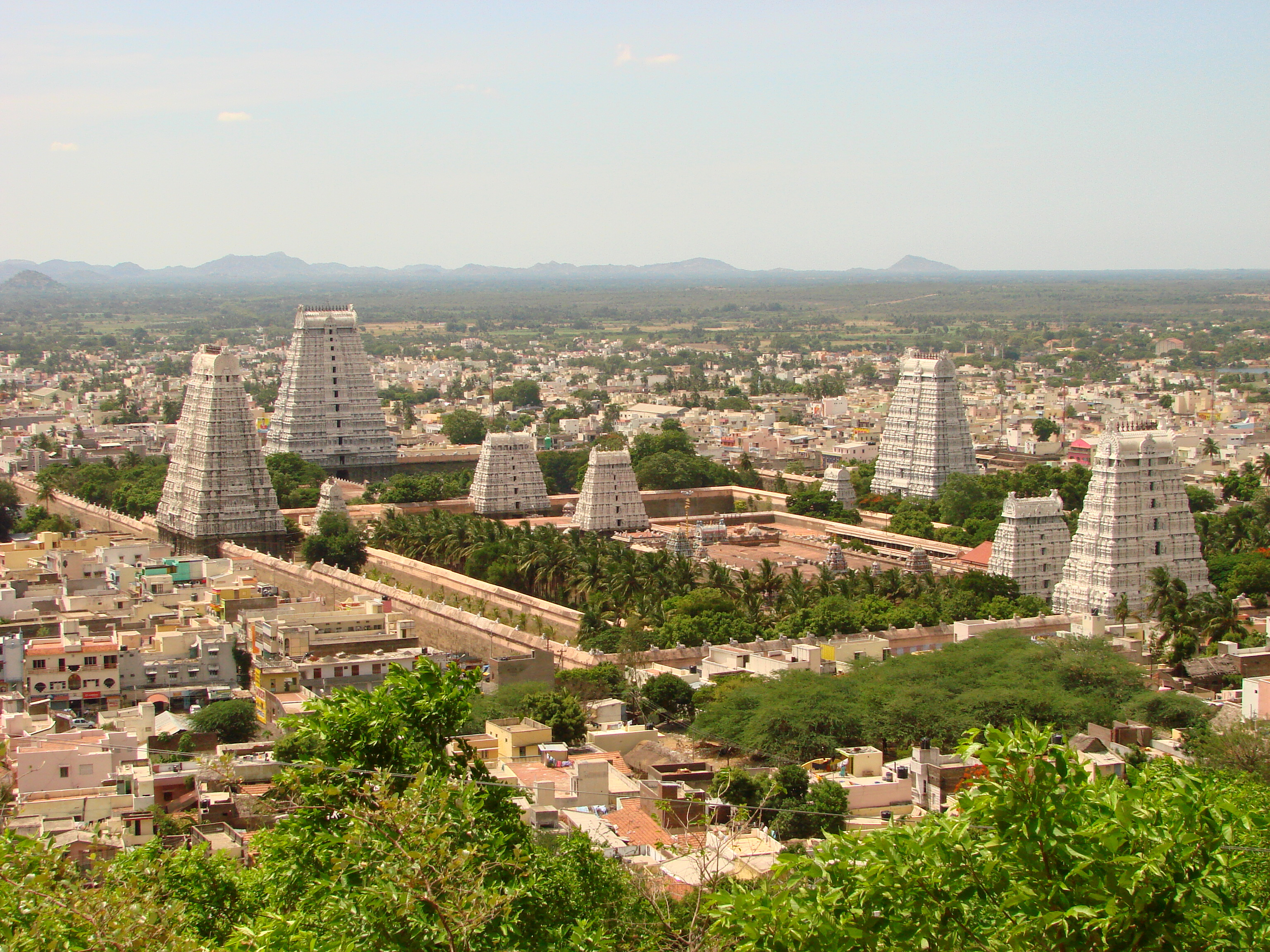
- Annamalaiyar temple at Thiruvannamalai

- Location in Tamil Nadu, India
- Coordinates: 12.20°N 79.06°E
- Country: India
- State: Tamil Nadu
- District: Tiruvannamalai

Government
  - Municipal special mayor: Balachandran (ADMK)
- Elevation: 171 m (561 ft)

Population (2010)
  - Total: 21,901

Languages
  - Official: Tamil
- Time zone: UTC+5:30 (IST)
- PIN: 606 (604,605)
- Telephone code: 91-4175
- Vehicle registration: TN 25
- Sex ratio: 998 ♂/♀
- Lok Sabha constituency: thiruvannamlai
- Vidhan Sabha constituency: thiruvannamalai city

Adhi Annamalai is a suburb of Thiruvannaamalai and selection grade town Panchayat in Thiruvannamalai Taluk.

== Demographics ==
It has the population of 21,901 according to a 2010 census, which is 9.4% higher than the 2001 population.

== Landmark ==
Adi Annamalai or Adhi Annamalai temple also known as Ani Annamalai is situated in Thiruvannamalai. It is one of the shrines of the Vaippu Sthalams. It is found in the girivalam of Tiruvannamalai temple. It is found in the girivalam route of Arunachalesvara Temple.

== See also ==
- Adi Annamalaiyar Temple, Adi Annamalai
