= Avalurpet =

- town panchayat
- Location in Tamil Nadu, India Avalurpet (India)
- Coordinates: 12.380°N 79.346539°E
- Country: India
- State: Tamil Nadu
- District: Viluppuram

Population (2021)
  - Total: 13,171 area_magnitude= sq. km

Languages
  - Official: Tamil
- Time zone: UTC+5:30 (IST)
- Sex ratio: 1:1 ♂/♀

Avalurpet is a developed village town panchayat in melmalayanur taluk of Viluppuram district. It has a population of 13,171 and acts as a junction for Thiruvannamalai and Melmalayanur temple and kelpennathur and chetpat.

== Geography ==
Avalurpet lies at the junction of state highway 4A running between Kilpennathur and Chetpet and 133A running from Thiruvannamalai. It is 23 km east of Thiruvannamalai, 10 km west from Melmalayanur and 10 km south from Kilpennathur and 20 km chetpat north.

There is a Murugan temple in Avalurpet, which is situated on a small hill at northeastern part. Panguni Uthiram (also Car festival) is celebrated every year in this temple during the month of April which happens for 10 days long and is very reputed festival for the people in and around it.

Avalurpet is a village known for the Sithagiri Murugan temple situated on the hill. Panguni uthiram celebration of this temple is quite popular for 10 decades. As the icons of history, Avalurpet has a five-century-old Agatheeswarar temple and a pond with beautiful neerazhi mandapam in the center of the pond. Avalurpet is the market place for the surrounding 10 km agriculture based rural population. Avalurpet is well connected by the state highways and transport through roadways very good. Agriculture is the major business in the village. The agricultural fields are mostly rainfed. Some of the lands are irrigated from the lake water and surface wells. The weekly farmers market and cattle market happen on Wednesday. The weekly market is the biggest revenue earner for the Avalurpet panchayat. The vegetables and greens, fish are sold by the farmer itself. As the village is a place for many temples. And every month there is a celebration activity in any one of the temple. As far as education is concerned there are government and private schools cater the needs of students. Government secondary school is available for boys and girls separately. There is also an arts college and an industrial training institute in this village. For higher education students of this village go to Tiruvannamalai, Vellore and Chennai. The name Avalurpet (Avalurpettai) of believed to be derived from aviri oor pettai. 'Aviri' is a plant from which blue indigo dye is extracted. Oor means village. Petri is used for some industrial place. For proving this fact there is a street name called neeli thotti street means blue tank. Which is nothing but blue due tank. The handloom business was once the major profession of this village. One more interesting thing about the street name is that, murunga Mara street due to street has moringa oleifera trees on each side of the street. The village has a primary health center with labor ward servers the people for their health problems in addition to the private doctor clinics. Avalurpet is located at the border of Viluppuram district. The nearest railway station is at Tiruvannamalai, a pilgrimage place for Hindus. Another famous religious place near Avalurpet is Melmalayanur people rush there for new moon day for worshipping the goddess Angalamman. Another famous Public Figure Educationist Dr.Dhanaraj Residence Situated in Kilpennathur Road Petrolpump, and Devimandapam
