= Singarapettai =

- Town
- Country: India
- State: Tamil Nadu
- District: Krishnagiri
- Elevation: 350 m (1,150 ft)

Population
  - Total: 117,500

Languages
  - Official: Tamil
- Time zone: UTC+5:30 (IST)
- PIN: 635307
- Telephone code: 04341
- Vehicle registration: TN-24
- Climate: chill and mild warmth (Köppen)

Singarapettai is a town in Krishnagiri district in Tamil Nadu. In the 2025 census it had a population of 117500 in 12000 households.

"Pambar" Dam is 6 km from here. It is 60 km from Krishnagiri, 9 km from Uthangarai, 30 km from Tirupattur and 65 km from Tiruvannamalai. It lies on NH 77. Near this town the attractions include a Perumal temple on the top of mountain, and a dense forest with various tourism attractions like Theerthavalasai Lake, Anguthi Water Falls, Cuckoo forest school, Temples and also in Singarapettai Extension Reserved forest kinds of Birds and Wild animals are available.

== Transport ==
=== Roads ===
The town is situated on the NH66 Road which plies from Krishnagiri to Thindivanam via Mathur, Uthangarai, Singarapettai, Chengam, Thiruvannamalai and Gingee.PAVAKKAL is short route for Singarapet to Harur via Hanumantheertham. It is connected to Tirupattur via Vishamangalam, Pasalai Kuttai and Vengalapuram.

Frequent buses ply from Singarapettai to Salem, Harur, Dharmapuri, Bangalore, Hosur, Krishnagiri, Tirupattur, Vaniyambadi, Chengam, Thiruvannamalai, Pondicherry, Melmaruvathur and Cheyyar.

=== Railways ===
The nearest railway stations are Samalpatti, Morappur, Tirupattur and Jolarpet.

=== Airways ===
The nearest airports are Salem and Chennai.
