= APSRTC Central Bus Station, Tirupati =

Bus station in Tirupati, India

APSRTC Central Bus Station

General information
- Location: Tatanagar, Tirupati, Andhra Pradesh 517501; India
- Coordinates: 13.6298°N 79.4263°E
- System: Passenger Transportation
- Owner: APSRTC
- Platforms: 64

Construction
- Parking: Yes

Other information
- Station code: TPT
Location
- Location within Andhra Pradesh Location within India

APSRTC Central Bus Station (CBS) is a bus station located in Tirupati in the Indian state of Andhra Pradesh. It is owned by Andhra Pradesh State Road Transport Corporation (APSRTC). It operates buses to all parts of the State and to nearby cities in Tamil Nadu, Karnataka, Telangana. This Bus station is spread over an area of 13.22 acres of land and it is the third largest Bus station in Andhra Pradesh after Pandit Nehru Bus Station (28 acres), NTR Bus Station (20.32 acres).

== Structure ==
There are three mini bus stations in the Tirupati Central bus station complex with a total of 64 platforms in 13.22 acres. The Srihari bus station, formerly known as Central bus station, is utilized for eastern services. The Srinivasa bus station is for west-bound destinations. The Saptagiri link bus station, renamed Yedukondala bus station, is utilized for services to Tirumala.

Tirupati bus stand had a fleet of 1500 buses with nearly 3900 daily trips. It carries on an average of 1.3 lakh passengers per day during normal days which makes it one of the busiest bus-stands.

== Platforms ==
Platforms	Buses
1, 2	Chennai
3, 4	Chennai, Puducherry, Kanchipuram, Chengalpattu
5	Kanchipuram, Thiruttani, Puducherry
6	Puttur, Nagari
7	Satyavedu
8	Srikalahasti (Express Buses)
9	Srikalahasti (Non-Stop Buses)
10	Srikalahasti (Pallevelugu)
11	Narasaraopet, Macherla, Sattenapalle
12	Machilipatnam, Vinukonda, Nuzvid
13	Vijayawada, Rajahmundry, Visakhapatnam
14	Eluru, Tanuku, Kakinada
15	Srisailam, Markapur
16	Nellore (Non-Stop Buses)
17	Bhadrachalam, Nalgonda, Miryalguda, Sattenapalle, Macherla
18	Nellore, Gudur, Kavali, Vakadu
19	Sullurupeta, Sriharikota
20	Venkatagiri, Rapur
21, 22	Bengaluru
23, 24	Bengaluru, Mysuru
25, 26	Salem, Coimbatore, Madurai, Tiruchirapalli, Thanjavur
27	Vellore, Tiruvannamalai
28	Chittoor
29	Kuppam, Palamaner, Krishnagiri, Hosur
30	Kurnool, Hyderabad
31	Allagadda, Nandyal
32	Proddatur, Jammalamadugu, Banaganapalle
33	Kadapa (Non-Stop Buses)
34	Rajampet, Badvel, Srisailam, Pulivendula, Tadipatri
35	Koduru, Rajampet, Penagalur, Konduru
36	Anantapur, Bellary, Hospet
37, 38	Madanapalle (Express and Non-Stop Buses)
39, 40	Pileru
41	Rayachoti
42	Punganur
43	Anupalli
44	Kanipakam
45 to 56	Tirumala
58, 59	Gudimallam, Musilipedu, Saraswathi Kandriga, Chellur, Chittoor (via Devalampeta)
61	Pachikapallam, Pallipattu, Karvetinagar, Penumuru
63	Ramapuram, Kammapalli, Paidipalle
64	Appalayagunta, Thandlam, Boyalagadda, Tirupati Collector Office
