= Mel-chengam =

Mel-chengam Melchengam
- panchayat town
- Location in Tamil Nadu, India
- Coordinates: 12.19°N 78.7°E
- Country: India
- State: Tamil Nadu
- District: Tiruvanamalai

Government
  - Type: tamilnadu
- Elevation: 272 m (892 ft)

Population (2001)
  - Total: 4,890

Languages
  - Official: Tamil
- Time zone: UTC+5:30 (IST)
- Postal code: 606703

Mel-chengam is a panchayat town in Chengam taluk of Thiruvannamalai district Tamil Nadu India. It is the first place in district by means of Bangalore road. It has a population of 4,890, and an altitude of 272 m above sea level.
