= Adi Annamalaiyar Temple, Adi Annamalai =

Hindu temple in Tamil Nadu, India

Coordinates: 12.252073°N 79.040376°E

Gopuram of Adi Annamalaiyar Temple in Tiruvannamalai

Adi Annamalaiyar Temple is a Siva temple in Adi Annamalai in Tiruvannamalai district in Tamil Nadu (India). This temple is in fact older than the “big” (Arunachaleshwar/ Annamalaiyar) temple in Tiruvannamalai. Like the lingam in the big temple, the lingam in the Adi Annamalai temple is also a swayambhu (self generated) lingam.

== Location ==
Adi Annamalai or Adhi Annamalai temple also known as Ani Annamalai is found in the girivalam of Tiruvannamalai temple.

== Vaippu Sthalam ==
It is one of the shrines of the Vaippu Sthalams sung by Tamil Saivite Nayanar Appar.

== Presiding deity ==
The presiding deity is known as Adi Annamalaiyar or Adi Arunachalesvarar. The Goddess is known as Adi Abithakujalambal.
