= Kilnathur =

Kilnathur Kizh-Arunai
- Panchayat town
- Location in Tamil Nadu, India
- Coordinates: 12.22°N 79.11°E
- Country: India
- State: Tamil Nadu
- District: Tiruvannamalai

Government
  - Chairman: ARUN PANDIYAN(ADMK)

Area
  - Total: 16.3 km^{2} (6.3 sq mi)
- Elevation: 169 m (554 ft)

Population (2012)
  - Total: 13,600
  - Density: 834/km^{2} (2,160/sq mi)

Languages
  - Official: Tamil
- Time zone: UTC+5:30 (IST)
- Postal codes: 606 610 (fully) and 606 603 {partly}.
- Telephone code: 91-4175
- Vehicle registration: TN 25
- Lok Sabha constituency: Tiruvannamalai
- Vidhan Sabha constituency: Tiruvannamalai city
- Climate: moderate (Köppen)
- Avg. summer temperature: 41 °C (106 °F)
- Avg. winter temperature: 18 °C (64 °F)

Kilnathur, also known as Kizh-arunai, is a town panchayat and suburb in Tiruvannamalai district, Tamil Nadu, India. It is one of the oldest settlements in the North Arcot region. It developed along with Tiruvannamalai.

== Demographics ==
Linguistic census
Linguistic groups	Percent(%)
Tamil	70.57%
Kannada	4.07%
Urdu	3.79%
Telugu	13.01%
Tulu	6.01%
Creole	0.4%
Malay	0.13%
Other	0.01%

Historical population
Year	Pop.	±%
1901	9,867	—
1951	13,912	+41.0%
1961	16,441	+18.2%
1981	24,462	+48.8%
1991	29,196	+19.4%
2001	34,376	+17.7%
2011	39,578	+15.1%
Sources: 1951 – 2001

As of 2001, Kilnathur had a population of 90,000. In the 2011 census, it had a population of 99,600.
