= Thenral Nagar =

- Town panchayat
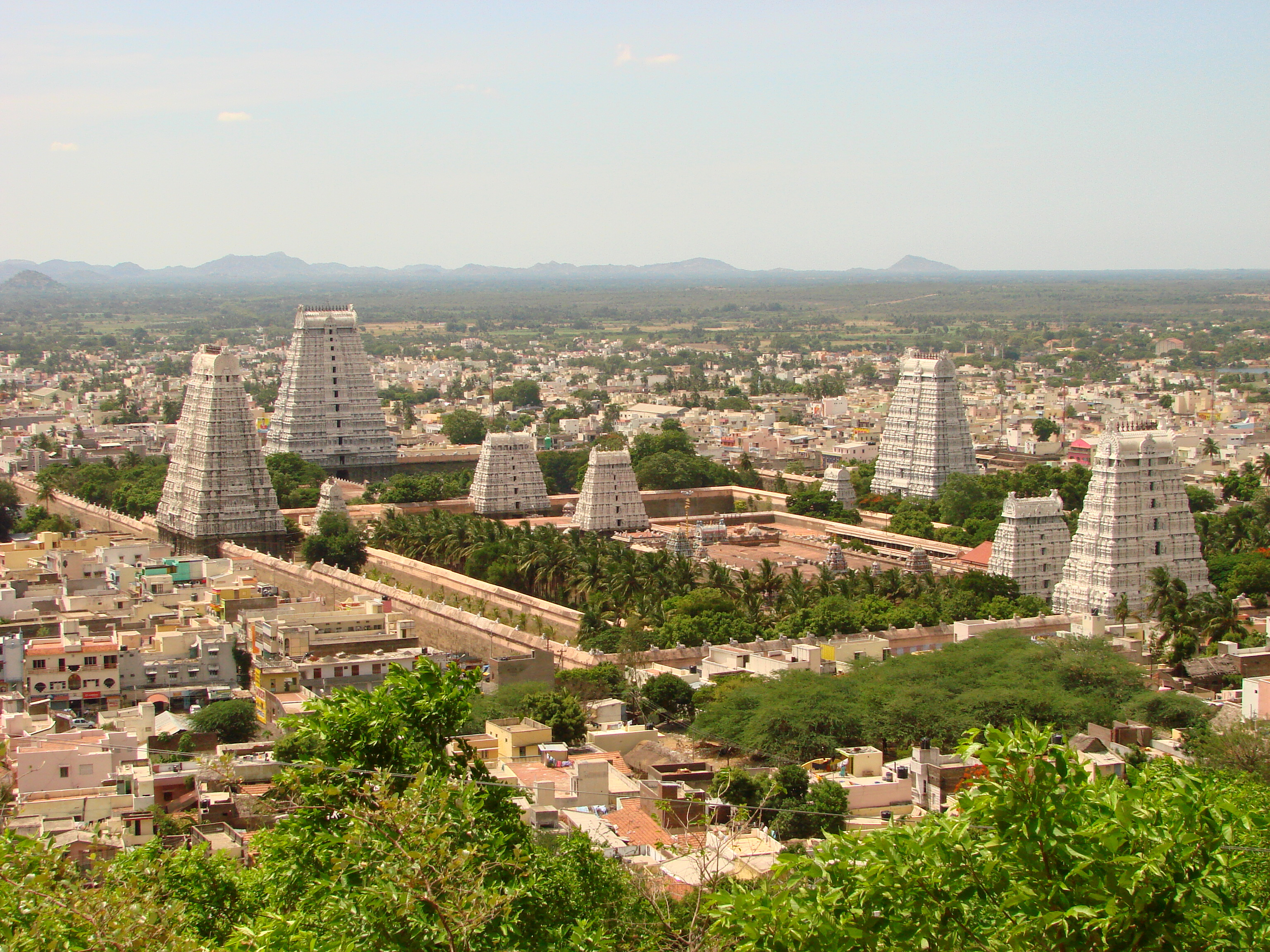
- Annamalaiyar temple at Thiruvannamalai
- Country: India
- State: Tamil Nadu
- District: Tiruvannamalai

Government
  - Chairman: thangalatchumi paniyarasan (dmk)

Area
  - Total: 16.3 km^{2} (6.3 sq mi)
- Elevation: 171 m (561 ft)

Population (2012)
  - Total: 29,000
  - Density: 1,800/km^{2} (4,600/sq mi)

Languages
  - Official: Tamil
- Time zone: UTC+5:30 (IST)
- PIN: 606 605
- Telephone code: 91-4175
- Vehicle registration: TN 25
- Lok Sabha constituency: thiruvannamlai
- Vidhan Sabha constituency: thiruvannamalai city
- Climate: moderate (Köppen)
- Avg. summer temperature: 41 °C (106 °F)
- Avg. winter temperature: 18 °C (64 °F)

Thenral Nagar is a township in Tiruvannamalai Taluk in Tiruvannamalai District in Tamil Nadu State. Melathikkan is 2.6 km far from its Taluk Main Town Tiruvannamalai. It is located 2.9 km distance from its District Main City Tiruvannamalai. It is located 158 km distance from its State Main City Chennai.

Near-by towns and panchayats with distance are Tiruvannamalai (2.9 km), Thenmathur (3.3 km), So.Kilnachipattu (3.4 km), Chinnakangiyanur (3.8 km) and Nallavanpalayam (4.3 km). Towns Near By Tiruvannamalai (2.6 km), Thandrampet (15.3 km), Thurinjapuram (19.9 km) and Keelpennathur (21.8 km).

== Demographics ==
Thenral nagar having population of over 29000 providing sub urban to Tiruvannamalai urbanity. it comes under Tiruvannamalai urban agglomerations on Polur road (chitoor- Cudllore road) NH 234A. there is one railway station for Thenral nagar as "Vengikkal-Thenral nagar" at katpadi railway route.
