= Thenmathur =

- panchayat town
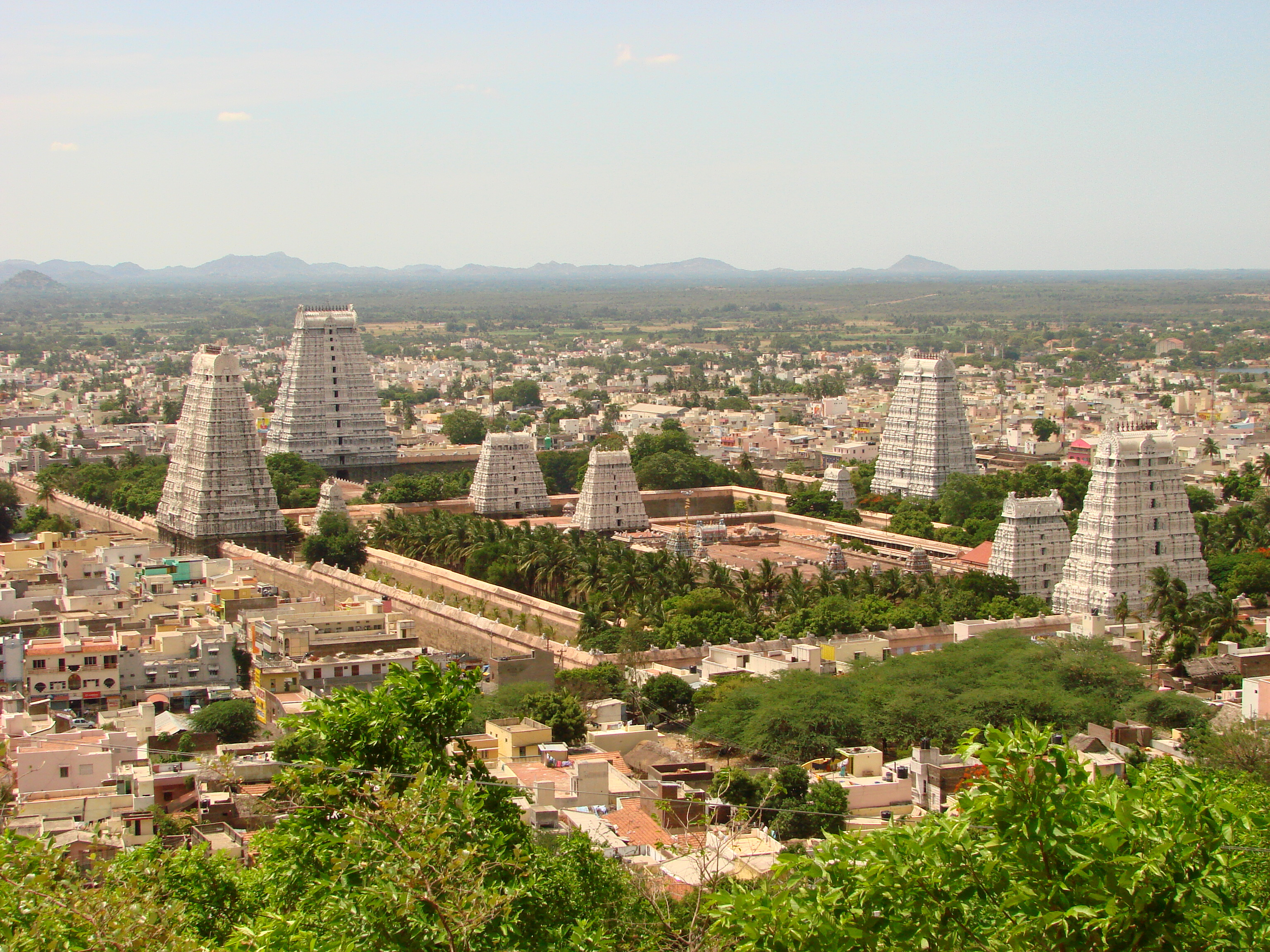

- Location in Tamil Nadu, India
- Coordinates: 12.20°N 79.11°E
- Country: India
- State: Tamil Nadu
- District: Tiruvannamalai

Government
  - Chairman: mrs. Vijitha kumaran (dmk)

Area
  - Total: 16.3 km^{2} (6.3 sq mi)
- Elevation: 171 m (561 ft)

Population (2012)
  - Total: 5,120
  - Density: 314/km^{2} (814/sq mi)

Languages
  - Official: Tamil
- Time zone: UTC+5:30 (IST)
- PIN: 606 609
- Telephone code: 91-4175
- Vehicle registration: TN 25
- Lok Sabha constituency: thiruvannamlai
- Vidhan Sabha constituency: thiruvannamalai city
- Climate: moderate (Köppen)
- Avg. summer temperature: 41 °C (106 °F)
- Avg. winter temperature: 18 °C (64 °F)

Thenmathur or EAC township is a township in Tiruvannamalai in Tiruvannamalai District in Tamil Nadu State. It serves as a suburban to its main city Tiruvannamalai. Thenmathur is 2.6 km from its Taluk Main Town Tiruvannamalai. Thenmathur is located 2.9 km from its District Main City Tiruvannamalai. It is located 158 km from its State Main City Chennai.

Nearby towns and panchayats with distance are Tiruvannamalai (2.9 km), So.Kilnachipattu (3.4 km), Chinnakangiyanur (3.8 km), Nallavanpalayam (4.3 km). Towns nearby Tiruvannamalai (2.6 km), Thandrampet (15.3 km), Thurinjapuram (19.9 km), Keelpennathur (21.8 km).

== Speciality ==
Tamil Nadu north zone's second famous deemed Arunai Engineering College and university is here. It is the second largest after Vit spreads over 14.5 km^{2} from Thenmathur to Veraiyur.

== Demographics ==
Thenmathur has a population of over 5000 providing sub urban to Tiruvannamalai urbanity. It comes under Tiruvannamalai urban agglomerations on Tirukovilur Road (Chitoor–Cudllore road) NH 234A. There are three railway stations for Thenmathur at Tirukovilur railway route:

- Thenmathur (requesting station)
- Arunai University – l
- Arunai University – ll
