= Ariyathur =

- Village
- Location in Tamil Nadu, India Ariyathur (India)
- Coordinates: 12.5°N 79.13°E
- Country: India
- State: Tamil Nadu
- District: Tiruvannamalai
- Elevation: 171 m (561 ft)

Population (2011)
  - Total: 865

Languages
  - Official: Tamil
- Time zone: UTC+5:30 (IST)
- PIN: 606907
- Telephone code: 04181
- Vehicle registration: TN 25

Ariyathur is a village in Polur Taluk in Tiruvannamalai District of Tamil Nadu, India. It is located 47 km towards east from district headquarters Thiruvannamalai. 167 km from state capital Chennai.

== Geography ==
It is located 47 km to the east of District headquarters Thiruvannamalai. Ariyathur Pin code is 606907 and postal head office is Vadamadimangalam. Ariyathur is surrounded by Melmalayanur Taluk towards south, Pernamallur Taluk towards north, Thellar Taluk towards east, West Arani Taluk towards north. Polur, Vandavasi, Tiruvethipuram, Tiruvannamalai are the nearby Cities to Ariyathur. This place is in the border of the Tiruvannamalai District and Villupuram District. Villupuram district Melmalayanur is south towards this place. Tamil is the local language here.

== Population ==
The population in Ariyathur is 865 as per the survey of census during 2011 by Indian Government. There are 225 households in this village. Population: 865 Households: 225 While the population is 865, there are 428 males in the village (49%) and 437 females are there (51%). Further the children below 6 years of age are 99 of which 52 are males and 47 are females. Population Sex-wise Children Males: 428. Male Percentage: 49%. Total Females: 437. Female Percentage: 51%. Children below 6 Years age: 99 Male Children below 6 Years age: 52 Female

== Education ==
- Renukampal Polytechnic College and Arts and Science College
- Annamalaiar College of Engineering

== Transportation ==
There is no railway station near to Ariyathur in less than 10 km. However Katpadi Junction Rail Way Station is major railway station 68 km near to Ariyathur.
