= Thenimalai =

தேனிமலை
- City
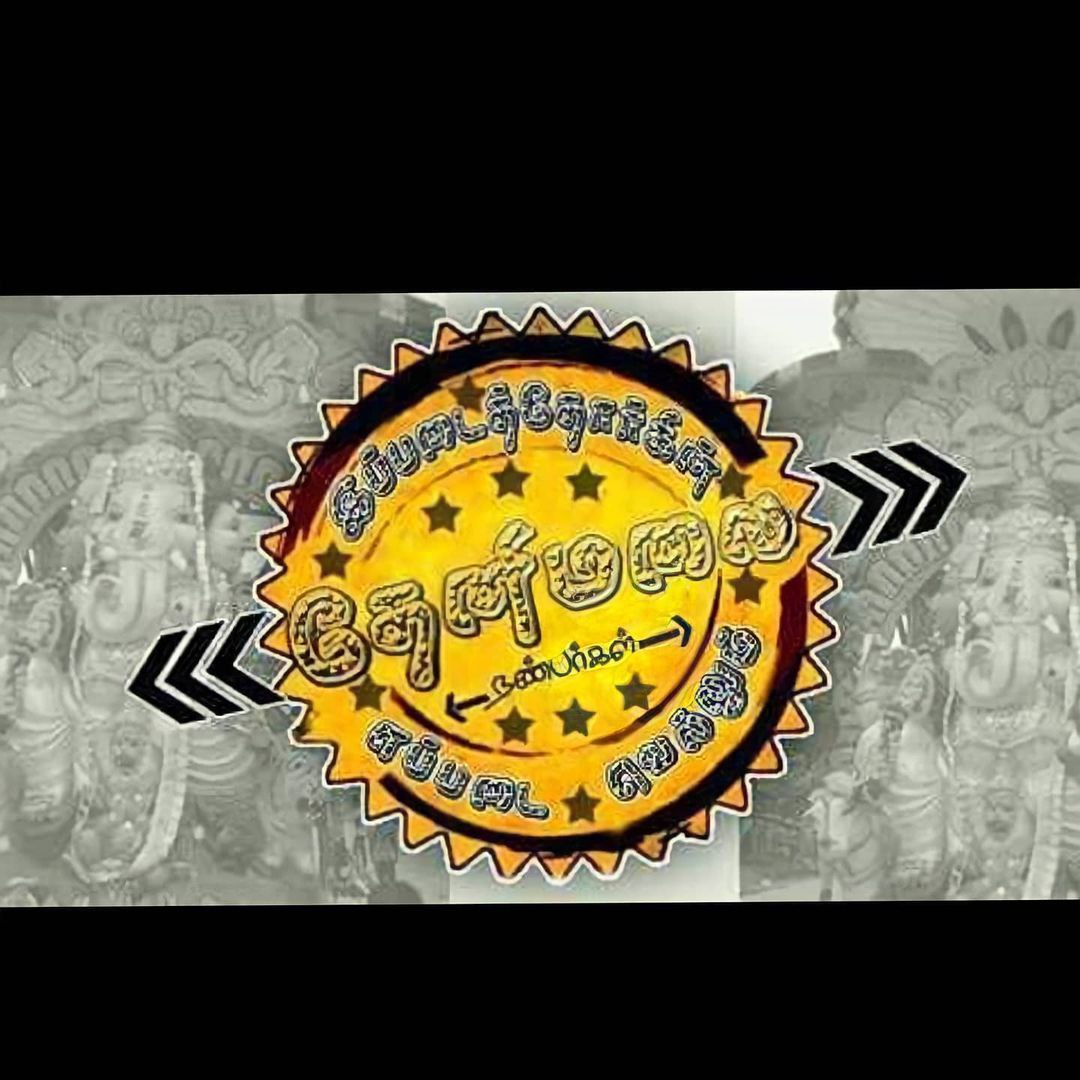
- A lion is always lion

- Location in Tamil Nadu, India
- Coordinates: 12.20°N 79.11°E
- Country: India
- State: Tamil Nadu
- District: Tiruvannamalai

Government
  - Chairman: kalinga dasan (dmk)

Area
  - Total: 16.3 km^{2} (6.3 sq mi)
- Elevation: 171 m (561 ft)

Population (2012)
  - Total: 12,784
  - Density: 784/km^{2} (2,030/sq mi)

Languages
  - Official: Tamil
- Time zone: UTC+5:30 (IST)
- Telephone code: 91-4175
- Vehicle registration: TN 25
- Lok Sabha constituency: thiruvannamlai
- Vidhan Sabha constituency: thiruvannamalai city
- Climate: moderate (Köppen)
- Avg. summer temperature: 41 °C (106 °F)
- Avg. winter temperature: 18 °C (64 °F)

Thenimali is a panchayat town in Indian state of Tamil Nadu. It is a suburb of Thiruvannamalai UA.
