= Melathikkan =

- panchayat town
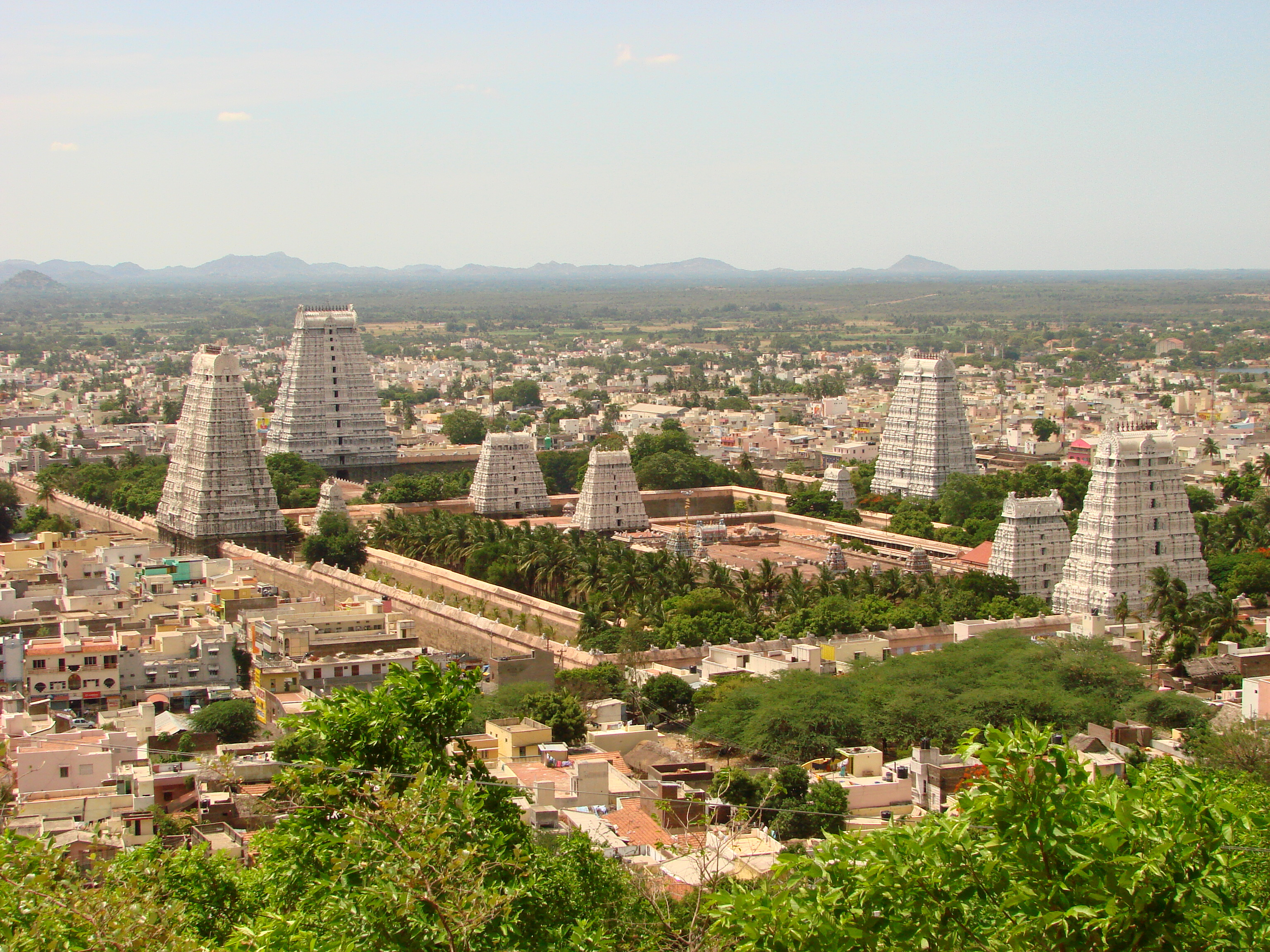

- Location in Tamil Nadu, India
- Coordinates: 12.20°N 79.11°E
- Country: India
- State: Tamil Nadu
- District: Tiruvannamalai

Government
  - Chairman: thangalatchumi paniyarasan (dmk)

Area
  - Total: 16.3 km^{2} (6.3 sq mi)
- Elevation: 171 m (561 ft)

Population (2012)
  - Total: 5,190
  - Density: 318/km^{2} (825/sq mi)

Languages
  - Official: Tamil
- Time zone: UTC+5:30 (IST)
- PIN: 606 608
- Telephone code: 91-4175
- Vehicle registration: TN 25
- Lok Sabha constituency: thiruvannamlai
- Vidhan Sabha constituency: thiruvannamalai city
- Climate: moderate (Köppen)
- Avg. summer temperature: 41 °C (106 °F)
- Avg. winter temperature: 18 °C (64 °F)

Melathikkan is a township in Tiruvannamalai Taluk in Tiruvannamalai District in Tamil Nadu State. Melathikkan is 2.6 km far from its Taluk Main Town Tiruvannamalai. Melathikkan is located 2.9 km distance from its District Main City Tiruvannamalai. It is located 158 km distance from its State Main City Chennai.

Nearby towns and panchayats with distance are Tiruvannamalai (2.9 km), Thenmathur (3.3 km), So.Kilnachipattu (3.4 km), Chinnakangiyanur (3.8 km), Nallavanpalayam (4.3 km). Towns nearby Tiruvannamalai (2.6 km), Thandrampet (15.3 km), Thurinjapuram (19.9 km), Keelpennathur (21.8 km).

== Demographics ==
Melathikkan has a population of over 5,000, providing sub urban to Tiruvannamalai urbanity. It comes under Tiruvannamalai urban agglomerations on tirukovilur road (chitoor- Cudllore road) NH 234A. there is one railway station for Melathikkan as "MELATHIKKAN - SARON " at tirukovilur railway route.
