= Pallikondapattu =

Coordinates: 12°13′N 79°07′E

Pallikondapattu is a small hamlet in the town of Tiruvannamalai. This village is around 5 km before Tiruvannamalai, off National Highway 66 (NH66) and forms part of the postal area of "Chinakangiyanur".

This village is surrounded by a big lake on one corner and farms on all other sides. The village is totally dependent on North-West Monsoon. It is lush green during rainy days and extremely dry in summer.

There are many small temples, some of which include Veera Vanniya Valla Maharaja Temple, Sri Muneeswaran Temple and Sri Mangala Vinayagar Temple. There is also a small Christian community. The basic occupation is farming and cattle rearing, and the main crops include paddy and sugarcane. At the west end of the village on the banks of small stream, the "Masi Magam" festival is celebrated once in a year during the month of February.

The Railway route is from Tindivanam to Tiruvannamalai. S. K. P. Engineering College is on the North East corner of the village.
