= Vengikkal =

- Thiruvannamalai Metro
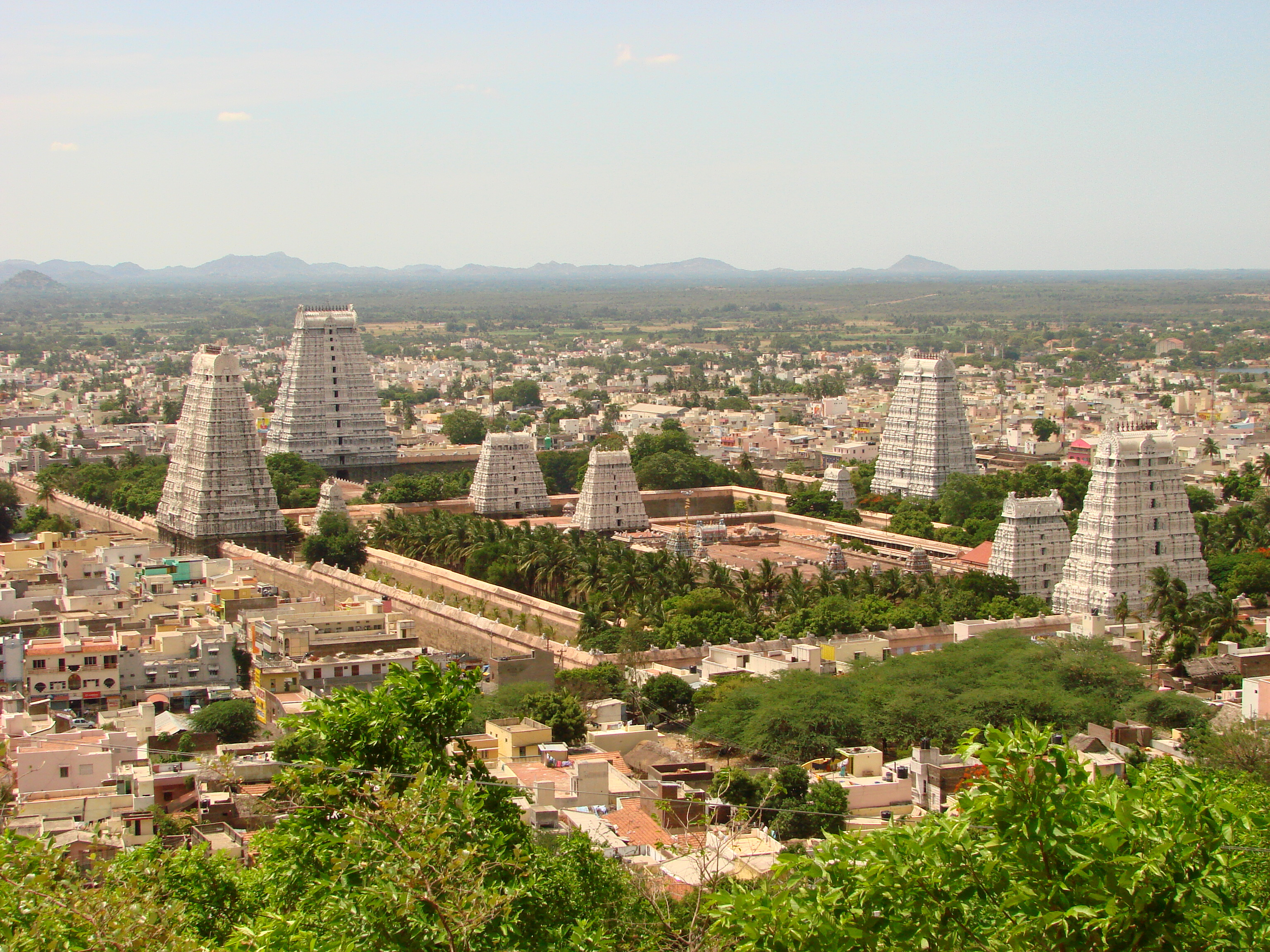
- Annamalaiyar temple at Thiruvannamalai

- Location in Tamil Nadu, India
- Coordinates: 12.20°N 79.07°E
- Country: India
- State: Tamil Nadu
- District: Tiruvannamalai

Government
  - Type: Village Panchayat
  - Body: Panchayat Union of Tiruvannamalai
- Elevation: 171 m (561 ft)

Population (2010)
  - Total: 61,901

Languages
  - Official: Tamil
- Time zone: UTC+5:30 (IST)
- PIN: 606604
- Telephone code: 91-4175
- Vehicle registration: TN 25
- Sex ratio: 998 ♂/♀
- Lok Sabha constituency: Tiruvannamalai Lok Sabha Constituency
- Legislative constituency: Tiruvannamalai Legislative Assembly

Vengikkal is the Suburb of Tiruvannamalai city and a census town in the Tiruvannamalai district of Tamil Nadu state of Indian sub-continent.

It lies north to the world famous Tiruvannamalai city. The Divisional and District Government offices of Tiruvannamalai including Tiruvannamalai district collectorate, Tiruvannamalai Transport division headquarters of TNSTC and Tirvannamalai Medical college, government hospital are present in Vengikkal municipal limits.

== Demographics ==
It has the population of 62,000 in 2011 census and it is 65% higher than 15,890, its 2001 population.

Linguistic census
Linguistic groups	Percent(%)
Tamil	69.57%
Telugu	21.07%
Urdu	2.89%
Kannada	8.01%
Tulu	3.4%
Creole	0.4%
Other	4.01%

== Railway Transport ==
Nearest Railway Station is Tiruvannamalai at 4.6 km Situated on Katpadi-Villupuram Railway route.

== Road Transport ==
The local Bus stops are at Thendral Nagar, EB Office, Vengikkal, Collector Office on Vellore Road. TNSTC Bus Depot, Idukkupillayar Koil, Kubera Lingam on Kanchi Road. Krishna Nagar and Seriyandhal on Avalurpet Road.

== Nearest Airport ==
The nearest airport is at Chennai, which is located 174 km (107 mi) from vengikkal.

== Government Museum ==
All New Government Museum Tiruvannamalai is situated at Vengikkal.

== Tiruvannamalai Sipcot ==
Tiruvannamalai Sipcot is there in Vengikkal. PVC pipes and Granites manufacturing small scale industries are there.

== Water Source ==
vengikkal has a large Lake opposite to the district Collectorate.

== Banks ==
Indian Bank inside Collectorate Campus, Union Bank at Thendral Nagar (formerly Corporation Bank), SME Branch Of State Bank of India at Vanavil Nagar, Canara Bank, HDFC bank, IDFC first bank, ICICI Bank, Kotak Mahindra Bank.
