= Nallavanpalayam =

Nallavan Palayam
- Census town
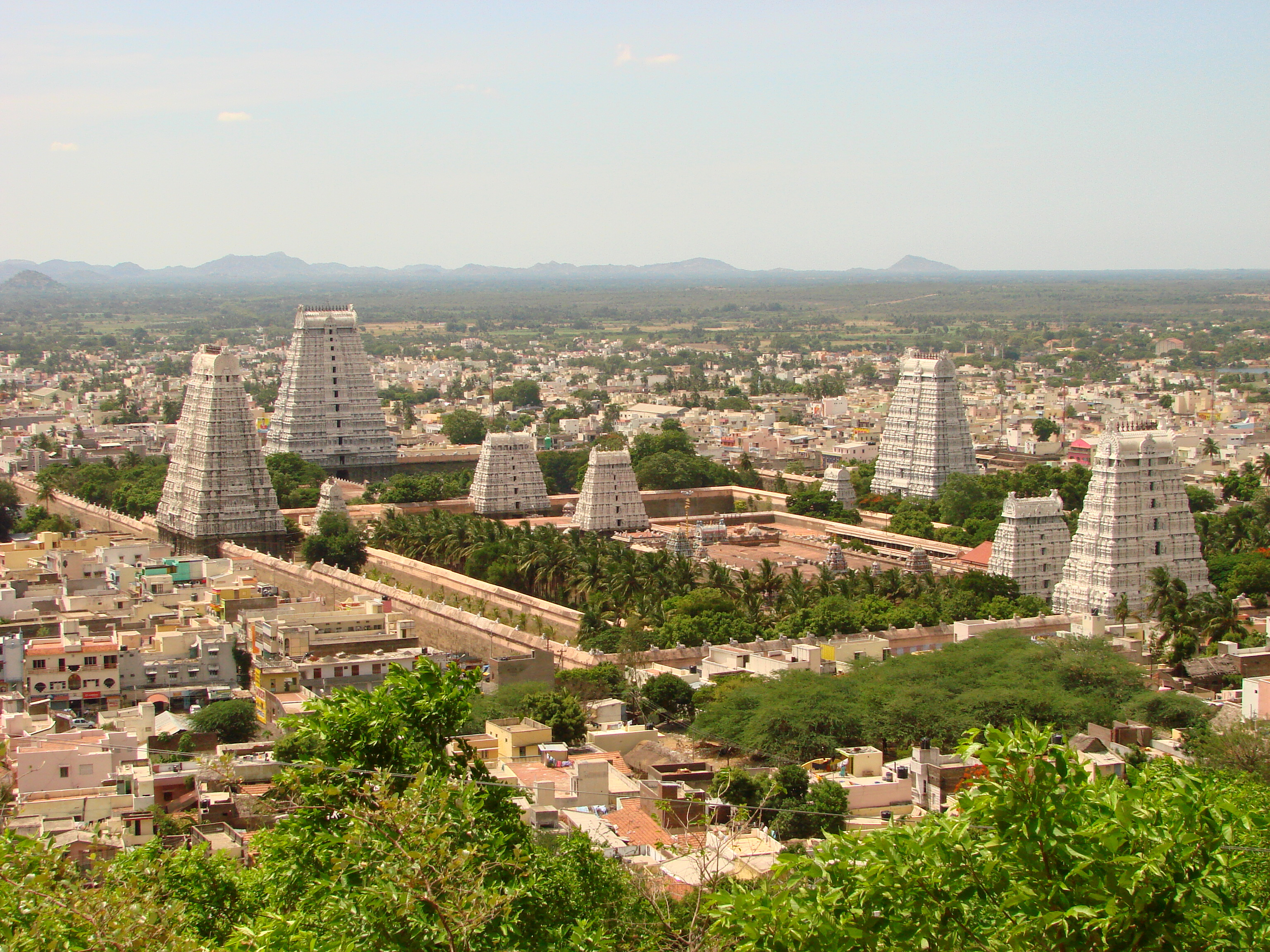
- Annamalaiyar temple at Tiruvannamalai

- Location in Tamil Nadu, India
- Coordinates: 12.18°N 79.05°E
- Country: India
- State: Tamil Nadu
- District: Tiruvannamalai

Government
  - President: Uma Elumalai(ADMK)

Area
  - Total: 16.3 km^{2} (6.3 sq mi)
- Elevation: 171 m (561 ft)

Population (2012)
  - Total: 6,921
  - Density: 425/km^{2} (1,100/sq mi)

Languages
  - Official: Tamil
- Time zone: UTC+5:30 (IST)
- Postal codes: 606 (603{partly}, 604{fully}, 605{partly})
- Telephone code: 91-4175
- Vehicle registration: TN 25
- Lok Sabha constituency: thiruvannamlai
- Vidhan Sabha constituency: thiruvannamalai city
- Climate: moderate (Köppen)
- Avg. summer temperature: 41 °C (106 °F)
- Avg. winter temperature: 18 °C (64 °F)

Nallavanpalayam is a census town to Tiruvannamalai Urban Amalgamation in Tiruvannamalai District in Tamil Nadu State in India. Nallavanpalayam is 4.1 km distance from the main city Tiruvannamalai and 161 km distance from its state main city Chennai.

Nearby towns & villages with distance are Melchettipattu (2.2 km), Viswanthangal (2.9 km), Melkachirapattu (3.5 km), Meyyur (3.6 km), Tiruvannamalai (3.7 km),. Near By towns are Tiruvannamalai (4.1 km), Thandrampet (11.2 km), Thurinjapuram (21.9 km), Keelpennathur (24.7 km),

Nallavanpalayam Pin Code is 606603, 606 604, 606 605.

== Demographics ==
Nallavanpalayam has a population of over 7,000, providing sub urban to Tiruvannamalai urbanity. it comes under Tiruvannamalai urban amalgamation on Salem (via - harur & thandarampattu) road SH -9. there is one railway station for Palayam as "NALLAVAN PALAYAM" shortly as"N.P"at up coming route of tiruvannamalai-thandaramapttu-chengam-singarapet-uthangarai-samalpatti-bargur-vepannahalli-bangalore (k.r.puram) railway route.
