= Penumuru =

- Mandal
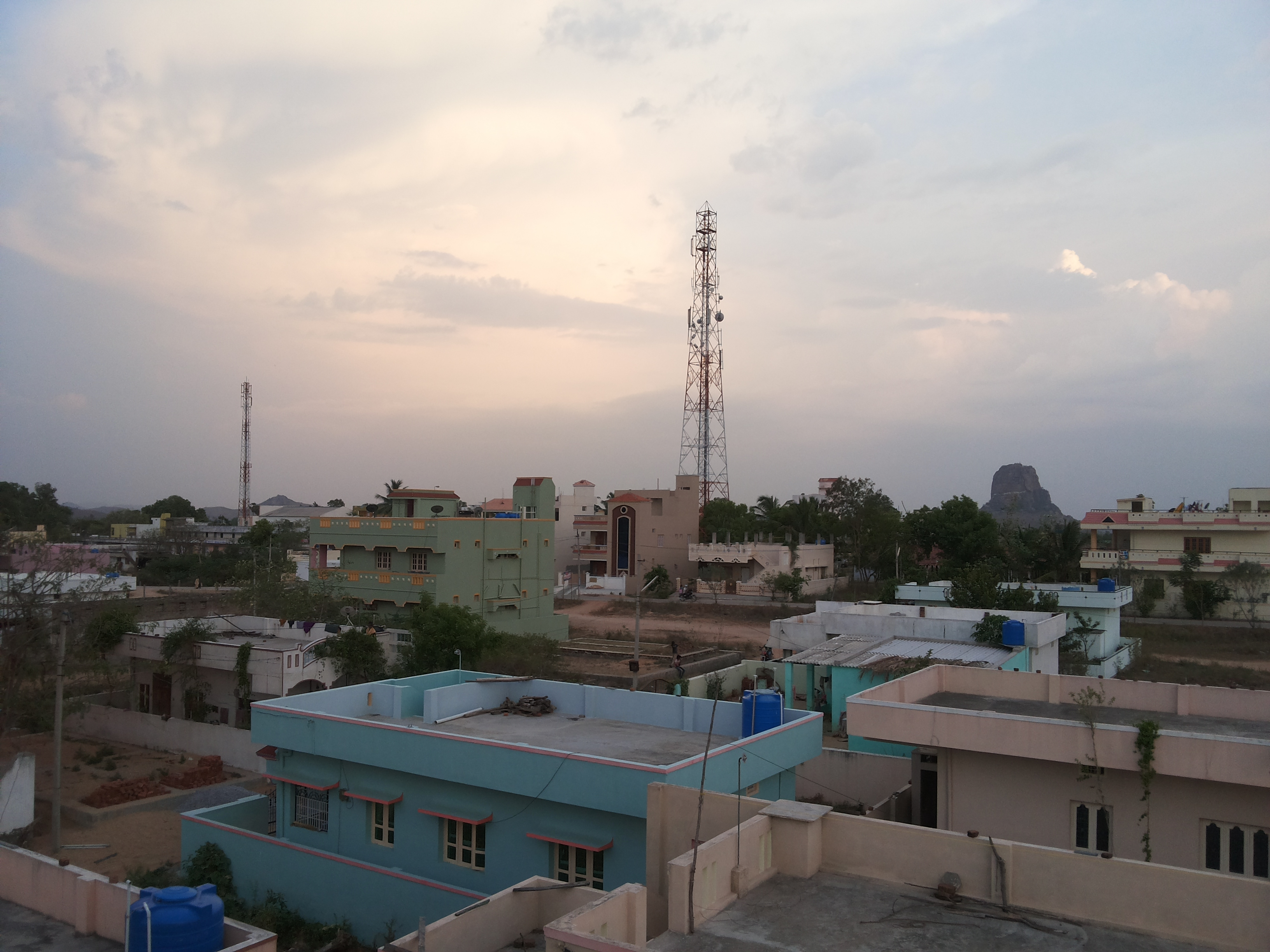
- Interactive map of Penumuru
- Location in Andhra Pradesh, India
- Coordinates: 13.3667°N 79.1833°E
- Country: India
- State: Andhra Pradesh
- District: Chittoor
- Elevation: 368 m (1,207 ft)

Languages
  - Official: Telugu
- Time zone: UTC+5:30 (IST)
- Vehicle registration: AP 03

Penumuru is a village in Chittoor district of the Indian state of Andhra Pradesh. It is the mandal headquarters of Penumuru mandal.

== Geography ==
Penumuru is located at 13.3667°N 79.1833°E. It has an average elevation of 368 meters. The important geographical location point is PULIGUNDU which is at 2.5km from the area.
