= Melmalayanur =

- town
- Location in Tamil Nadu, India
- Coordinates: 12.40°N 79.40°E
- Country: India
- State: Tamil Nadu

Population
  - Total: 17,471

Languages
  - Official: Tamil
- Time zone: UTC+5:30 (IST)
- Postal code: 604204
- Vehicle registration: TN 16

Melmalayanur is a developing town in Villupuram district Tamil Nadu, India, 10 km from Avalurpet and 21km away from Gingee (Villupuram District) It is famous for the Goddess Angalaparameswari Amman temple . Devotees across South India visit this temple to avail blessings of lord Angala Amman. Near by Towns Avalurpet, Tiruvannamalai, Chetpet, Arani, Gingee.

Lakhs of devotees visit here every newmoon and fullmoon days since it is supposed to be auspicious during these days. Melmalayanur is assembly constituency which will send representative to the members to the state assembly.

== Location ==
Melmalayanur located at 10 km from Avalurpet, 40 km from Thiruvannamalai, 21 km from Gingee, and 35 km from Villupuram. Since devotees come to Avalurpet and gingee then go to Melmalayanur because Avalupet and Gingee connect NH and State Highway.

1. koyambedu-perungalathur-melmaruvathur-thindivanam-gingee-melmalayanur.
2. Kancheepuram-Vandavasi-Chetpet-Valathy/Avalurpet-Melmalayanur.
3. Kancheepuram-Cheyyaru-Pernamallur-Chetpet-Valathy/Avalurpet-Melmalayanur.
4. Trichy-Villupuram-gingee-melmalayanur.
5. Pondicherry-Thindivanam-Gingee-melmalayanur.
6. Bangalore -Hosur -krishnagiri -oothangarai-chengam -thiruvannamalai -avalurpet -Melmalayanur
