= Chengam =

Town and taluk headquarter in Tamil Nadu, India

Chengam sezhunganiyur
- town
- Location in Tamil Nadu, India
- Coordinates: 12.3°N 78.8°E
- Country: India
- State: Tamil Nadu
- District: Tiruvannamalai
- Elevation: 272 m (892 ft)

Population (2011)
  - Total: 54,278
- Demonym: 283,917 Population [2011] – Census

Languages
  - Official: Tamil
- Time zone: UTC+5:30 (IST)
- Postal code: 606 701
- Vehicle registration: TN 25
- Website: www.chengam.in

Chengam (or Chengamma as on British records) is an important market town and a taluk headquarter in the foothills of the Eastern ghats in Tiruvannamalai district of Tamil Nadu, India. Chengam is the gateway to the Chengam pass in the Eastern ghats between Javvadhu hills to the north and Chennakesava hills to the south. The town is also the centre for various industrial activities which includes Sathanur dam hydro-electric project, Aavin milk processing plant and Periya Kolappadi SIDCO estate.

== History ==
The book Malaipadukadam in the Sangakkala literature mentions that Nannansei Nannan was a short-lived king who ruled from the Palkunrakottam hill with his capital as his capital. Many rare historical sources such as inscriptions and archeological finds have been found to prove this. Researchers also say that Nannan-ruled Navira Hill now refers to the Jawadhu Hills and some to the mountains near the sea.

Initially Chengam was an assembly constituency (SC) of Tiruppattur (Lok Sabha constituency). In 2009 it became a part of the Tiruvannamalai Lok Sabha constituency.

== Geography ==
Chengam is located at 12.3°N 78.8°E. It has an average elevation of 272 metres (892 feet). Chengam municipality is located on the Pondicherry – Thiruvannamalai – Bangalore route, at a distance of 34 km from Thiruvannamalai.

Climate : Chengam rainfall with an average of 1200.35mm per year, which is mostly getting during northeast monsoon when it is September, October, November, December

== Demographics ==
Linguistic census
Linguistic groups	Percent(%)
Tamil	87.64%
Urdu	7.79%
Telugu	4.01%
Creole	0.4%
Malay	0.13%
Other	0.01%

Historical population
Year	Pop.	±%
1901	3,867	—
1921	6,305	+63.0%
1931	9,457	+50.0%
1941	11,678	+23.5%
1951	14,912	+27.7%
1961	17,441	+17.0%
1981	23,462	+34.5%
1991	31,196	+33.0%
2001	41,037	+31.5%
2011	54,278	+32.3%
Sources: 1951 – 2001; 2011

Chengam is a municipality in Tiruvannamalai district. As of 2011 India census, Chengam had a population of 54,278 and an average literacy rate of 79.3%. Child population below 6 was 2,210 males and 2,479 females. Chengam has 142,845 people employed; 84,623 are male and 58,222 are female with an employment ratio of 50%. Chengam is 5th in Tiruvannamalai district and ranked 69th in Tamil Nadu. The literacy ratio is 68% with 170,277 total literate people. In terms of literacy, Chengam is ranked 6th in Tiruvannamalai district and 230th in Tamil Nadu.

== Politics ==
It is a part of the Tiruvannamalai (Lok Sabha constituency) since 2009.

== Culture ==
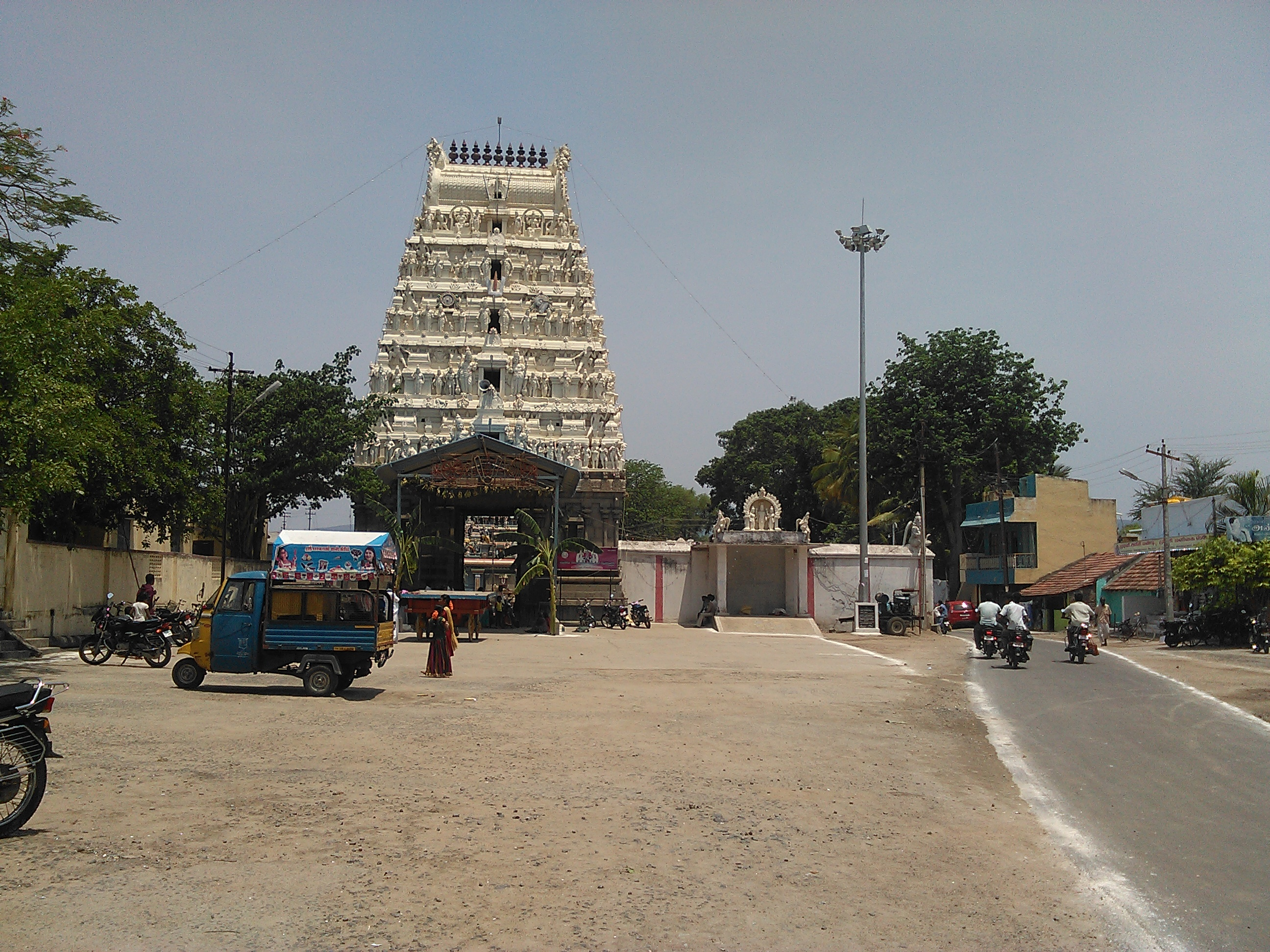
Chengam Sri Venukopala Parthasarathy Perumal Temple festival annually in May in makakaruta waxing service with great karutacevai kotierrat festival will be held in 10 days

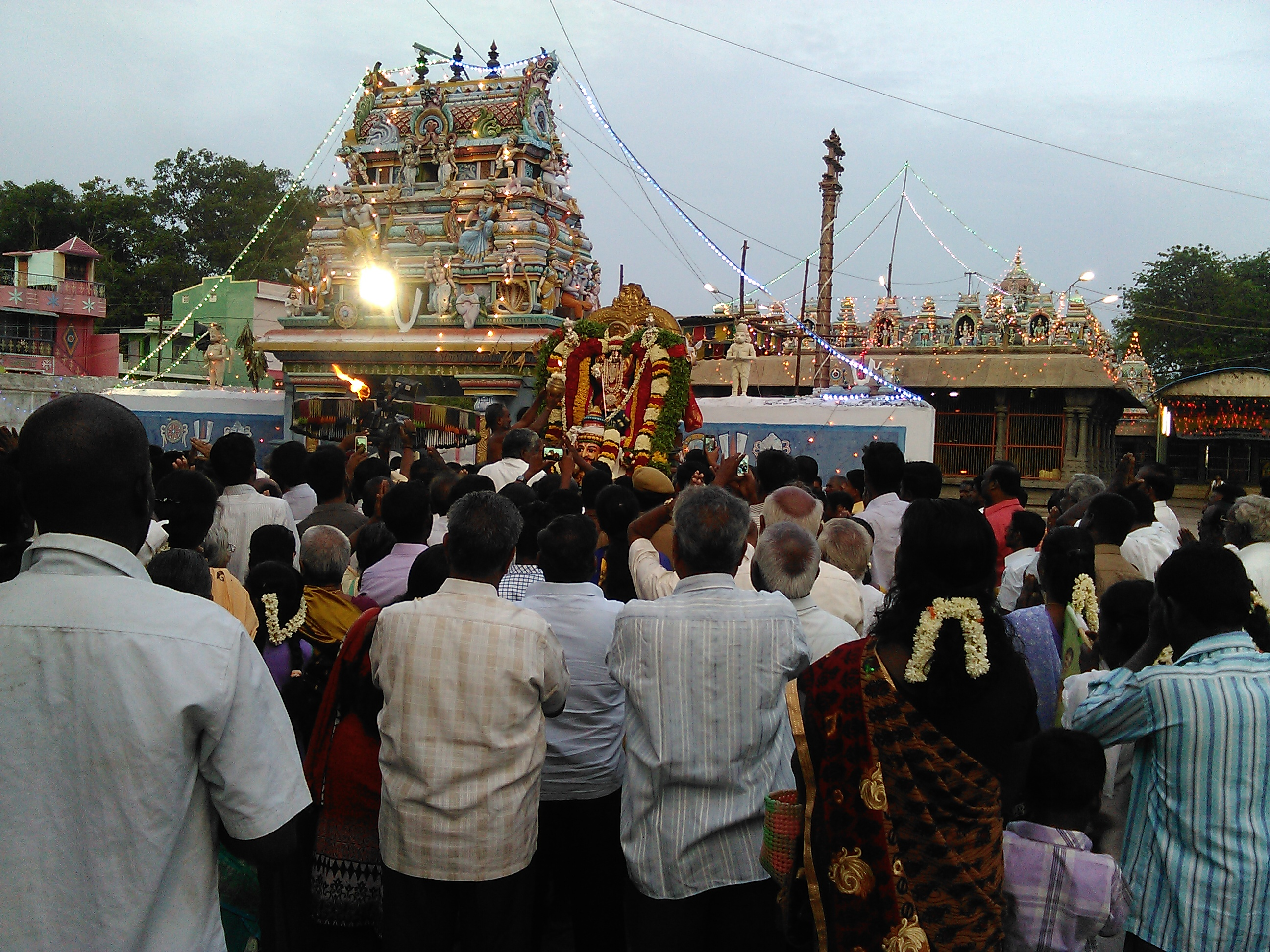

On the basis of the epigraphs found engraved in the Upapitha part of the main shrine, Arulmigu Venugopala Parthasarathi And Rishabeshvarar Temple may be dated to the late Vijayanagara Nayaka Period of the 17th Century AD. Its architecture and layout is a model for Annamalaiyar Temple. For this festival the temple is decorated with colored lights, fireworks, naiyantimelam, karakattam (dance). Preparations are made for the show by the festival committee and sponsors.

== Roadways ==
Chengam lies on the mid-way of NH66 plying from Bangalore to Puducherry via Thiruvannamalai. It is separated from Thiruvannamalai at a distance of 35 km. It is well connected with major nearby Metro City Is Vellore City. Major towns like Arani, Polur, Thiruvannamalai, Singarapettai, Pudupalayam, Sathanur Dam, Thandarampattu and Uthangarai. Frequent buses ply from Chengam to Salem, Dharmapuri, Bangalore, Hosur, Krishnagiri, Tirupattur, Vellore, Chennai, Polur, Uthangarai, Hogenakkal, Pondicherry, Thiruvannamalai, Kallakurichi, Vizhuppuram and Chidambaram.

Local town buses ply to Sathanur Dam, Kadaladi, Kanchi, Polur, Pudupalayam, Singarapettai, Neepathurai, Mel ravanthavadi, Thaazhaiyoothu, Thandarampattu, Pachal and many other villages.
