= Tiruvannamalai =

City in Tamil Nadu, India

- City
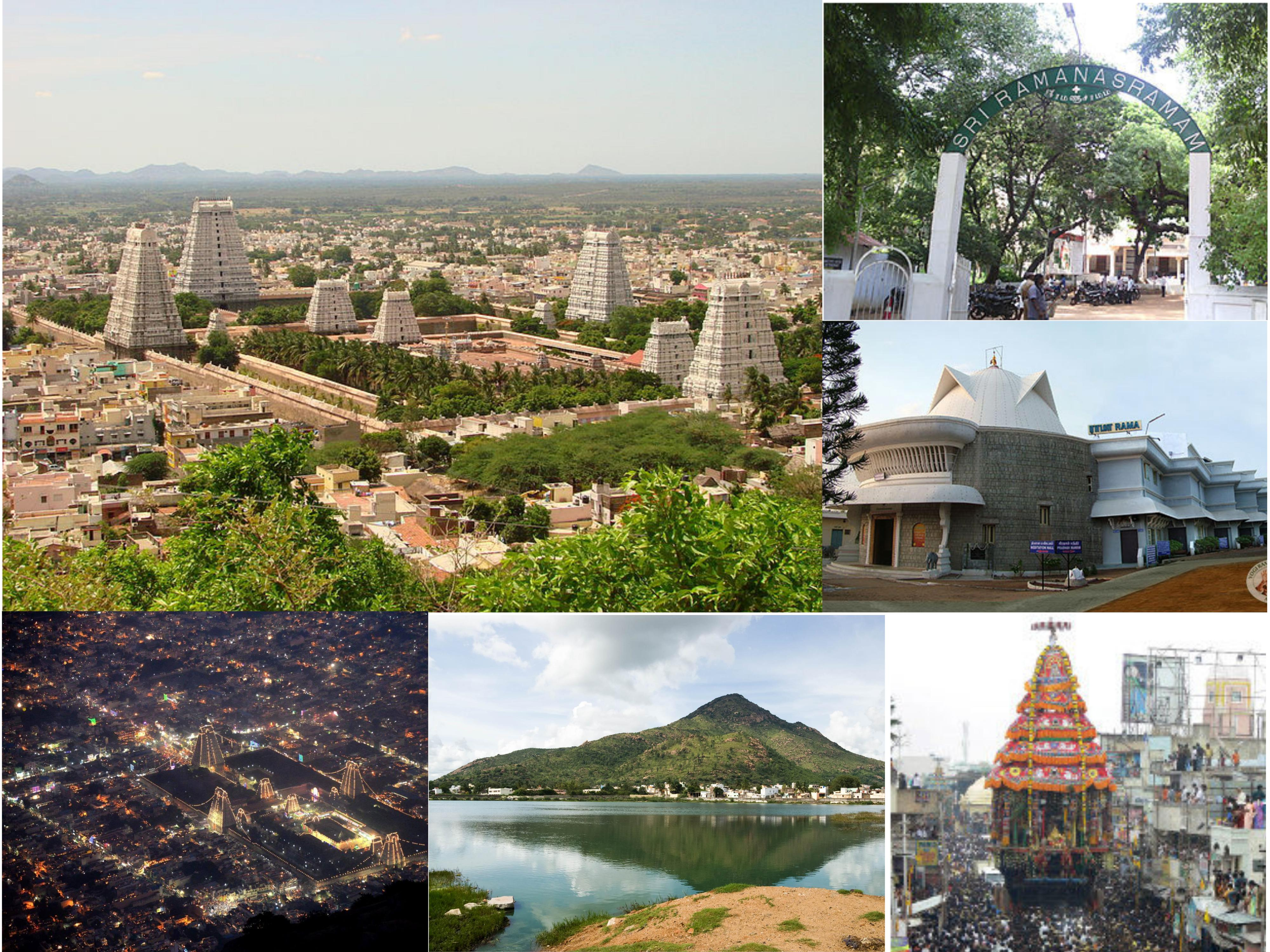
- Clockwise from top left: view of Tiruvannamalai with Arulmigu Annamalaiyar Temple towers in the centre and hills in the background, Sri Ramana Ashram entrance, Yogi Ramsuratkumar Ashram, Great Chariot, view of Annamalai Hill from outskirts, Tiruvannamalai at night.

- Location within Tamil Nadu
- Coordinates: 12°13′38.111″N 79°4′14.162″E
- Country: India
- State: Tamil Nadu
- District: Tiruvannamalai
- Taluk: Tiruvannamalai

Government
  - Type: Mayor–council
  - Body: Tiruvannamalai Municipal corporation
  - Mayor: Nirmala Velmaran

Area
  - City: 102.99 km^{2} (39.76 sq mi)
- Elevation: 171 m (561 ft)

Population (2011)
  - City: 210,491
  - Rank: 22nd (in Tamilnadu)
  - Metro: 398,100

Languages
  - Official: Tamil
- Time zone: UTC+5:30 (IST)
- PIN: 606 601 to 606 611
- Telephone code: 91-4175
- Vehicle registration: TN 25
- Member of Legislative assembly: E. V. Velu (DMK)

Tiruvannamalai (Note: Tamil: Tiruvaṇṇāmalai; IPA: ˈtiɾɯʋaɳːaːmalɛi̯, also spelt Thiruvannamalai; earlier anglicised as Trinomali or Trinomalee) is a city and the administrative headquarters of Tiruvannamalai district in the Indian state of Tamil Nadu. It is also a Hindu cultural hub and prominent pilgrimage destination, home to the Arulmigu Annamalaiyar Temple situated along the Annamalai hill, where the monthly Girivalam practice and the annual Karthika Deepam festival attracts thousands.

Tiruvannamalai has a thriving service sector industry, including retail, resorts and recreation activities. Apart from the service sector, the city is also the hub for many industrial setups including SIDCO, spinning mills and premier educational institutions. The city is administered by the Tiruvanamalai City Municipal Corporation, originally constituted in the year 1886 as Tiruvannamalai Municipality. The city is connected to the state capital Chennai (150 km) and neighbouring state Karnataka's capital Bengaluru (145 km) via highways and railways. The Union Ministry of Civil Aviation is considering setting up a new airport at Tiruvannamalai.

== Etymology and legend ==
In Hinduism, Parvati, wife of Shiva, once closed the eyes of her husband playfully in a flower garden at their abode atop Mount Kailash. Although only a moment for the gods, all light was taken from the universe, and the earth, in turn, was submerged in darkness for years. Parvati performed penance with other devotees of Shiva, and her husband appeared as a big column of fire at the top of Annamalai hills, returning light to the world. He then merged with Parvati to form Ardhanarishvara, the half-female, half-male form of Shiva. The Annamalai, or red mountain, lies behind the Annamalaiyar temple, and is associated with the temple of its namesake. The hill is sacred and considered a lingam, or iconic representation of Shiva, in itself. Another legend is that once, while Vishnu and Brahma contested for superiority, Shiva appeared as a flame, and challenged them to find his source. Brahma took the form of a swan, and flew to the sky to see the top of the flame, while Vishnu became the boar Varaha, and sought its base. The scene is called lingothbava, and is represented in the western wall at the sanctum of most Shiva temples. Neither Brahma nor Vishnu could find the source, and while Vishnu conceded his defeat, Brahma lied and said he had found the pinnacle. In punishment, Shiva ordained that Brahma would never have temples on earth in his worship. In Tamil, the word Arunam means red or fire and Asalam means hill. Since Shiva manifested himself in the form of fire in this place, this name Arunachalam came to be associated with Annamalai hill and the city. The first mention of Annamalai is found in Tevaram, the seventh century Tamil Saiva canonical work by Appar and Tirugnanasambandar.

== History ==
The history of Tiruvannamalai revolves around the Annamalaiyar Temple. The recorded history of the city dates back to the ninth century, as seen from a Chola inscriptions in the temple. Further inscriptions made before ninth century indicate the rule of Pallava kings, whose capital was Kanchipuram. The seventh century Nayanar saints Sambandar and Appar wrote of the temple in their poetic work, Tevaram. Sekkizhar, the author of the Periyapuranam records both Appar and Sambandar worshiped Annamalaiyar in the temple. The Chola Kings ruled over the region for more than four centuries, from 850 to 1280, and were temple patrons. The inscriptions from the Chola king record various gifts like land, sheep, cow and oil to the temple commemorating various victories of the dynasty. Madhva saint Vadiraja Teertharu of sixteenth century has mentioned about this place in his travelogue work Tirtha Prabandha.

The Hoysala kings used Tiruvannamalai as their capital beginning in 1328 as their empire in Karnataka was annexed by the Delhi Sultanate and fought off the invasions from Madurai Sultans and Sultanate governors in the Deccan until 1346. There are 48 inscriptions from the Sangama Dynasty (1336–1485), two inscriptions from Saluva Dynasty (1485–1505), and 55 inscriptions from Tuluva Dynasty (1505–1571) of the Vijayanagara Empire, reflecting gifts to the temple from their rulers. There are also inscriptions from the rule of Krishnadeva Raya (1509–1529), the most powerful Vijayanagara emperor, indicating further patronage. Most of the Vijayanagara inscriptions were written in Tamil, with some in Kannada and Sanskrit. The inscriptions in the temple from the Vijayanagara kings indicate emphasis on administrative matters and local concerns, which contrasts the inscriptions of the same rulers in other temples like Tirupathi. The majority of the gift related inscriptions are for land endowments, followed by goods, cash endowments, cows and oil for lighting lamps. The city of Tiruvannamalai was at a strategic crossroads during the Vijayanagara Empire, connecting sacred centers of pilgrimage and military routes. There are inscriptions that show the area as an urban center before the precolonial period, with the city developing around the temple, similar to the Nayak ruled cities like Madurai.

During the 18th century, Tiruvannamalai came under the dominion of the Nawab of the Carnatic. As the Mughal Empire came to an end, the Nawab lost control of the city, with confusion and chaos ensuing after 1753. Subsequently, there were periods of both Hindu and Muslim stewardship of the temple, with Muraru Raya, Krishna Raya, Mrithis Ali Khan, and Burkat Ullakhan besieging the temple in succession. As European incursions progressed, Tiruvannamalai was attacked by French Soupries, Sambrinet, and the English Captain Stephen Smith. While some were repelled, others were victorious. The French occupied the city in 1757 and it came under the control of the British in 1760. In 1790, Tiruvannamalai city was captured by Tippu Sultan, who ruled from 1782 to 1799. During the first half of the 19th century, the city came under British rule.

== Geography ==
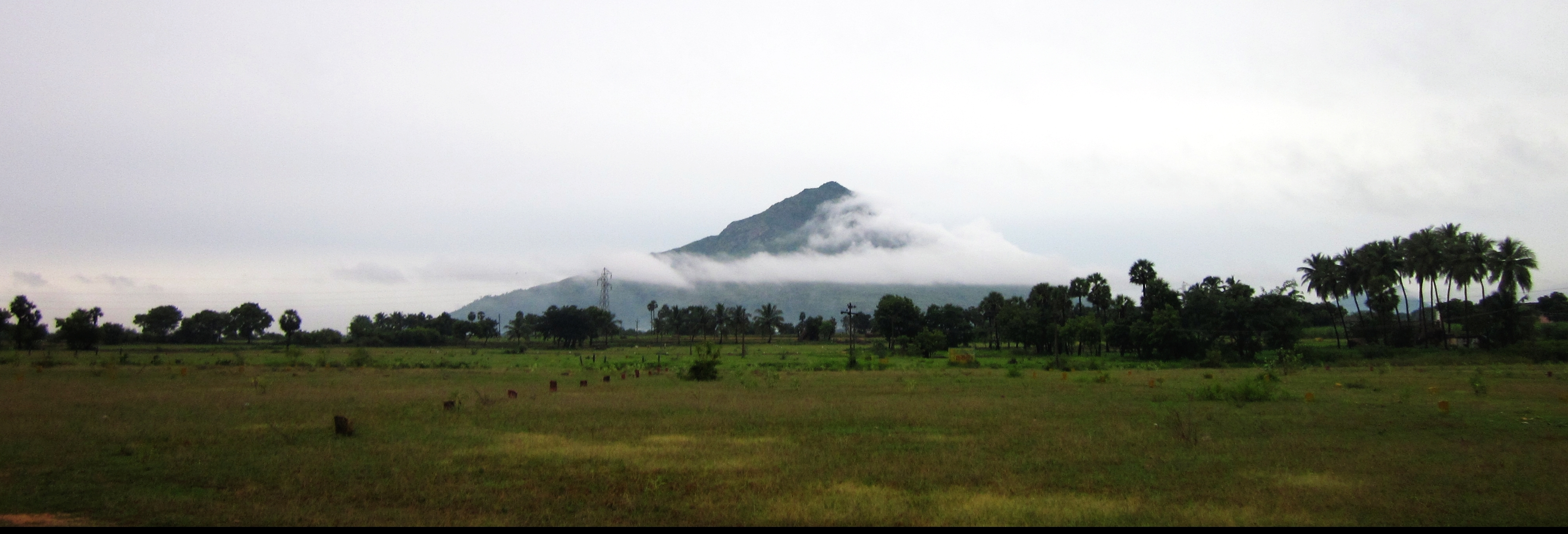
Annamalai Hill

Tiruvannamalai is situated 196 km (122 mi) from the state capital Chennai and 210 km (130 mi) from Bangalore. The height of the Annamalai hill is approximately 2,669 ft (814 m). Tiruvannamalai is located at 12°N 79.05°E. It has an average elevation of 200 metres (660 ft). The city is located to the east of Eastern Ghats. The topography of Tiruvannamalai is almost plain sloping from west to east. The temperature ranges from a maximum of 40 °C (104 °F) to a minimum of 20 °C (68 °F). Like the rest of the state, April to June are the hottest months and December to January are the coldest. Tiruvannamalai receives scanty rainfall with an average of 815 mm (32.1 in) annually, which is lesser than the state average of 1,008 mm (39.7 in). The southwest monsoon with an onset in June and lasting up to August brings scanty rainfall. Bulk of the rainfall is received during the northeast monsoon in the months of October, November and December. The average humidity of the city is 77% and varies between 67% and 86%. During the summer months of April to June, the humidity ranges from 47% to 63%. The municipality covers an area of 16.3 km^{2} (1,630 ha).

Climate data for Tiruvannamalai (2002–2021)
Month	Jan	Feb	Mar	Apr	May	Jun	Jul	Aug	Sep	Oct	Nov	Dec	Year
Record high °C (°F)	35.3 (95.5)	39.8 (103.6)	42.8 (109.0)	44.4 (111.9)	45.0 (113.0)	44.3 (111.7)	40.9 (105.6)	39.4 (102.9)	39.6 (103.3)	39.2 (102.6)	35.8 (96.4)	35.0 (95.0)	45.0 (113.0)
Mean daily maximum °C (°F)	29.2 (84.6)	32.0 (89.6)	35.0 (95.0)	37.1 (98.8)	38.5 (101.3)	36.3 (97.3)	34.6 (94.3)	34.0 (93.2)	34.0 (93.2)	33.0 (91.4)	29.5 (85.1)	28.3 (82.9)	33.5 (92.2)
Mean daily minimum °C (°F)	18.2 (64.8)	19.2 (66.6)	21.3 (70.3)	24.8 (76.6)	26.3 (79.3)	26.0 (78.8)	25.1 (77.2)	24.6 (76.3)	24.1 (75.4)	22.9 (73.2)	20.8 (69.4)	19.2 (66.6)	22.7 (72.9)
Record low °C (°F)	10.2 (50.4)	12.0 (53.6)	12.1 (53.8)	13.8 (56.8)	18.1 (64.6)	19.6 (67.3)	18.8 (65.8)	18.7 (65.7)	18.7 (65.7)	15.6 (60.1)	12.1 (53.8)	9.3 (48.7)	9.3 (48.7)
Average precipitation mm (inches)	9.0 (0.35)	7.1 (0.28)	5.9 (0.23)	21.8 (0.86)	83.9 (3.30)	71.0 (2.80)	117.0 (4.61)	200.9 (7.91)	200.6 (7.90)	250.9 (9.88)	400.2 (15.76)	150.6 (5.93)	1,800.9 (70.90)
Average precipitation days	0.8	0.5	0.4	1.3	4.7	5.3	6.6	7.8	7.6	9.4	7.7	3.9	56
Source: India Meteorological Department,

== Demographics ==
Religious census
Religion	Percent(%)
Hindu	82.57%
Muslim	14.07%
Christian	2.79%
Jain	0.4%
Sikh	0.01%
Buddhist	0.01%
Other	0.13%
No religion	0.01%

Historical population
Year	Pop.	±%
1951	35,912	—
1961	46,441	+29.3%
1981	89,462	+92.6%
1991	109,196	+22.1%
2001	130,350	+19.4%
2011	145,278	+11.5%
Sources: 1951 – 2001; 2011

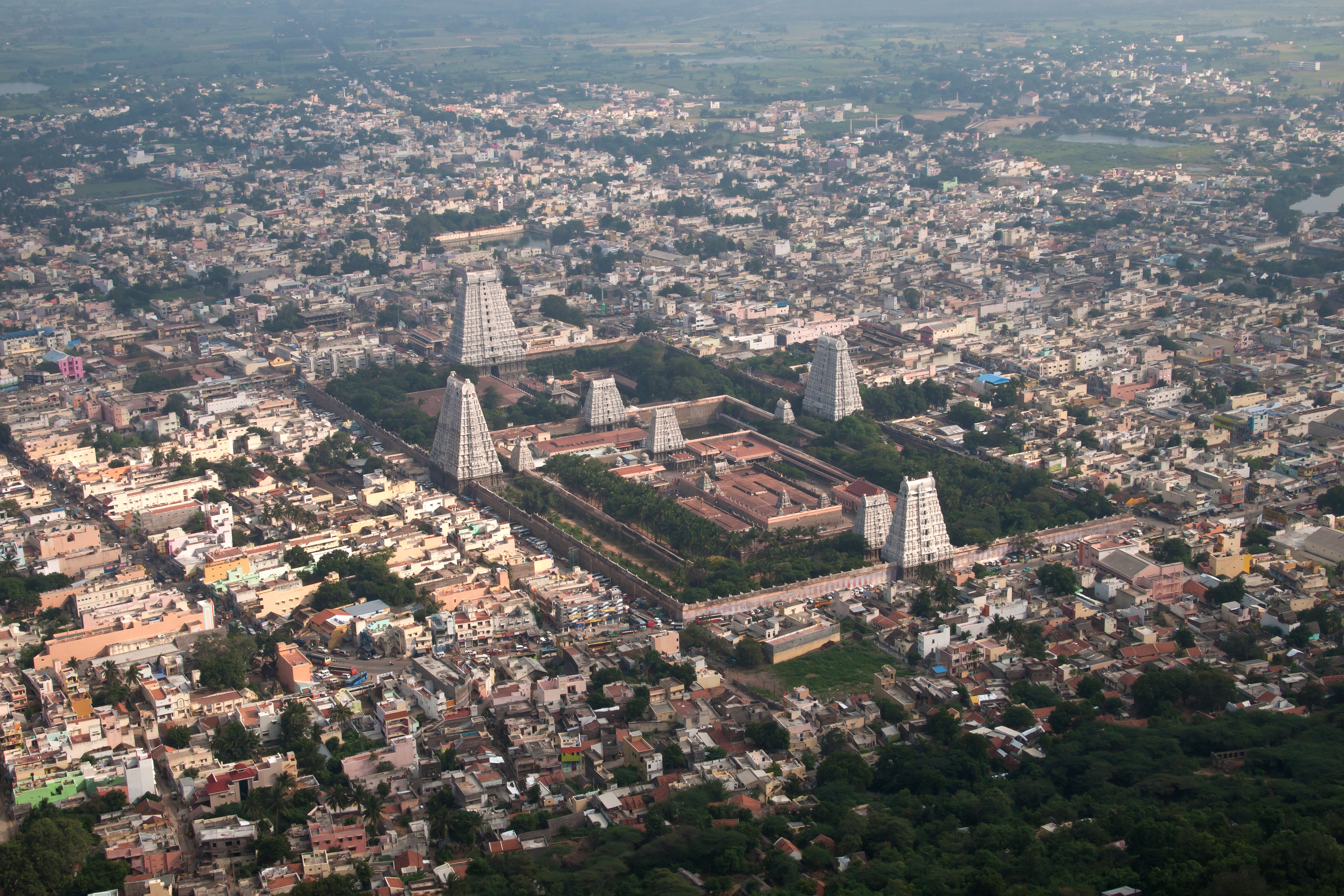
Densely populated city and temple

According to the provisional population totals of the 2011 census,^{b} Tiruvannamalai UA had a population of 145278, with 72406 males and 72872 females. The sex ratio of the city was 1,000 and the child sex ratio stood at 960. Tiruvannamalai had an average literacy rate of 81.64% with male literacy being 85.6%, and female literacy being 77.7%. A total of 14,530 of the population of the city was under 6 years of age. Tamil Is The Official Language.

According to 2011 census, Tiruvannamalai had a population of 145,278 with a sex-ratio of 1,006 females for every 1,000 males, much above the national average of 929. A total of 15,524 were under the age of six, constituting 7,930 males and 7,594 females. Scheduled Castes and Scheduled Tribes accounted for 12.37% and 1.22% of the population respectively. The average literacy of the city was 78.38%, compared to the national average of 72.99%. The city had a total of 33,514 households. There were a total of 50,722 workers, comprising 583 cultivators, 580 main agricultural labourers, 994 in house hold industries, 44,535 other workers, 4,030 marginal workers, 84 marginal cultivators, 105 marginal agricultural labourers, 421 marginal workers in household industries and 3,420 other marginal workers. As per the religious census of 2011, Tiruvannamalai had 82.57% Hindus, 14.07% Muslims, 2.79% Christians, 0.01% Sikhs, 0.01% Buddhists, 0.4% Jains, 0.13% following other religions and 0.01% following no religion or did not indicate any religious preference.

The maximum decadal growth of population in Tiruvannamalai was observed during 1971–81 and had reduced growth rate from 1981 due to the increased amount of industrial activity that took place outside the city. The density of the city was 45 per hectare during 1971 and increased to 90 during 1999. A total 446.2 ha (1,103 acres) (32.75%) of the land is used for residential, 48.77 ha (120.5 acres) (3.58%) for commercial, 22.34 ha (55.2 acres) (1.63%) for industrial, 39.35 ha (97.2 acres) (2.88%) for public & semi public, 30.38 ha (75.1 acres) (2.22%) for educational and 678.77 ha (1,677.3 acres) (56.94%) for non-urban purposes.

== Economy ==
Tiruvannamalai is a temple city and a major pilgrimage centre in Tamil Nadu. The city is the marketing and service city for the surrounding places. Being the administrative headquarters of the Tiruvannamalai district, Tiruvannamalai has a lot of tertiary sector activities. Trade and commerce and service activities are the major contributors to the economy of the city. In 1991, 7.93% of the population was involved in primary sector, 21.34% in secondary sector and 70.73% in tertiary sector activities. The city had a female work participation of 11%. Due to the urbanisation from 1971, there has been dip in primary sector activities and a proportional increase in the tertiary sector activities. There is limited agricultural activity within the city limits. The secondary sector involves manufacturing and construction, whose growth has remained stable over the decades. There are many oil mills, rice mills and agro based industries within the Tiruvannamalai city limits. The tertiary sector activities of trade, commerce, transport, storage, communication and other services has been increasing due to the increasing number of tourists to the city. The patronage to Girivalam has increased informal economic activities around the city. The major commercial activities are concentrated around Car Street, Thiruvoodal Street, Kadambarayan Street, Asaliamman Koil Street, Sivanpada Street and Polur Road.

All major nationalised banks such as State Bank of India, Vijaya Bank, Union Bank, Bank of India, Indian Bank, Central Bank of India, Punjab National Bank, Indian Overseas Bank, Bank of India, Bank of Maharashtra and private banks like ICICI Bank, HDFC Bank, Kotak Mahindra Bank, Axis Bank, DBS Bank, Tamilnad Mercantile Bank, IDBI Bank, Bank of Baroda, Karur Vysya Bank and City Union Bank have their branches in Tiruvannamalai. All these banks have their automated teller machines located in various parts of the city. Apart from major banks, the city also has many small finance banks and their automated teller machines.

== Culture ==
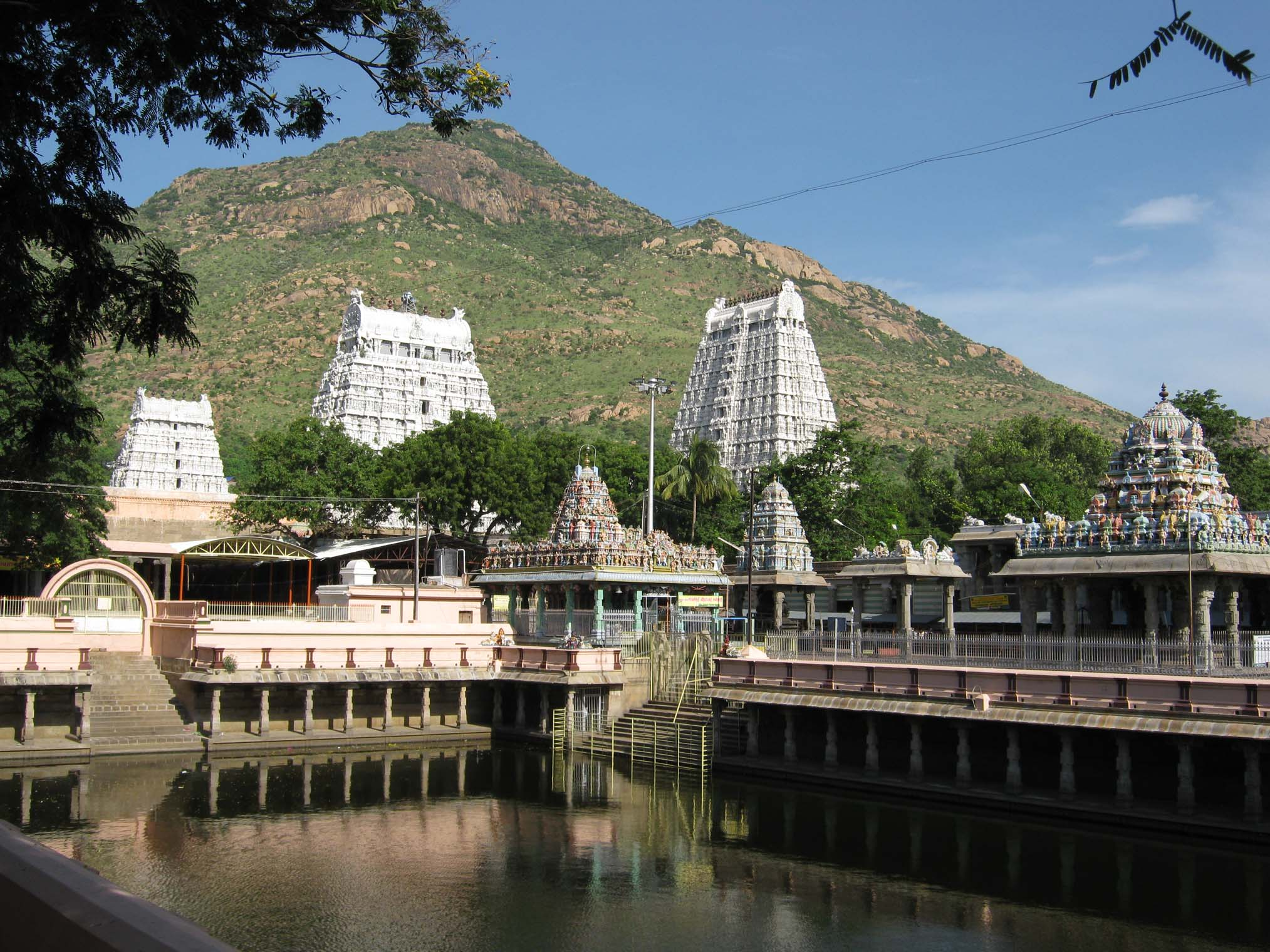
Image of the Annamalaiyar Temple with the Annamalai hills in the background

The Annamalaiyar Temple is the most prominent landmark of Tiruvannamalai. The temple complex covers an area of 10 ha (25 acres), and is one of the largest temples in India. It houses four gateway towers known as gopurams. The tallest is the eastern tower, with 11 stories and a height of 66 m (217 ft), making it one of the tallest temple towers in India. The temple has numerous shrines, with those of Annamalaiyar and Unnamalai Amman being the most prominent. The temple complex houses many halls; the most notable is the thousand-pillared hall built during the Vijayanagar period.

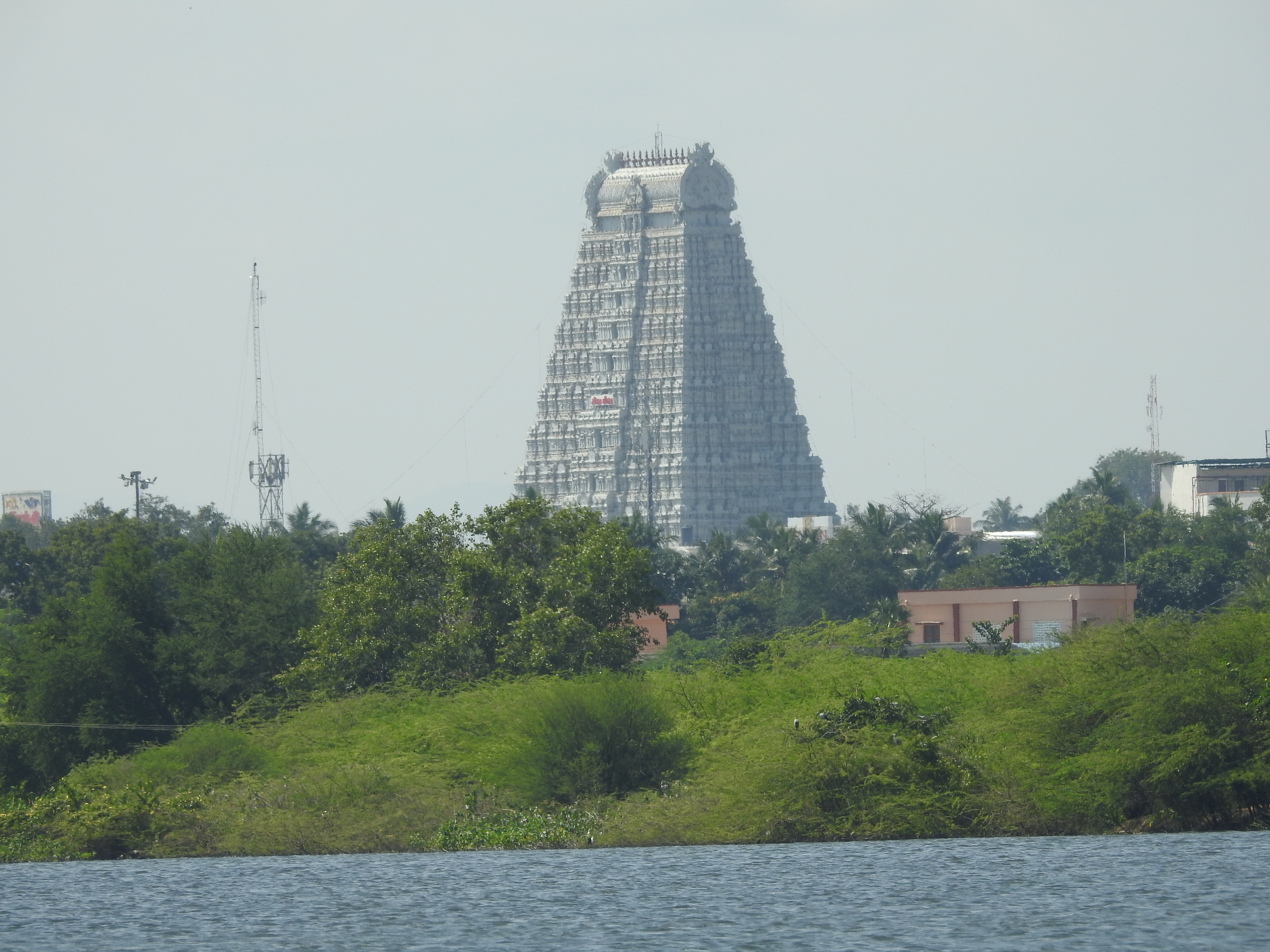
Rajagoupram seen from city's residential area

The Annamalaiyar temple is one of the Pancha Bhoota Stalas, or five Shiva temples, with each a manifestation of a natural element: land, water, air, sky or fire. In Annamalaiyar temple, Shiva is said to have manifested himself as a massive column of fire, whose crown and feet could not be found by the Hindu gods, Brahma and Vishnu. Aathara Stala are Shiva temples which are considered to be personifications of the Tantric chakras of human anatomy. The Annamalaiyar temple is called the Manipooraga stalam, and is associated with the Manipooraga chakra. The temple is revered in Tevaram, the Tamil Saiva canon and classified as Paadal Petra Sthalam, one of the 276 temples that find mention in the Saiva canon.

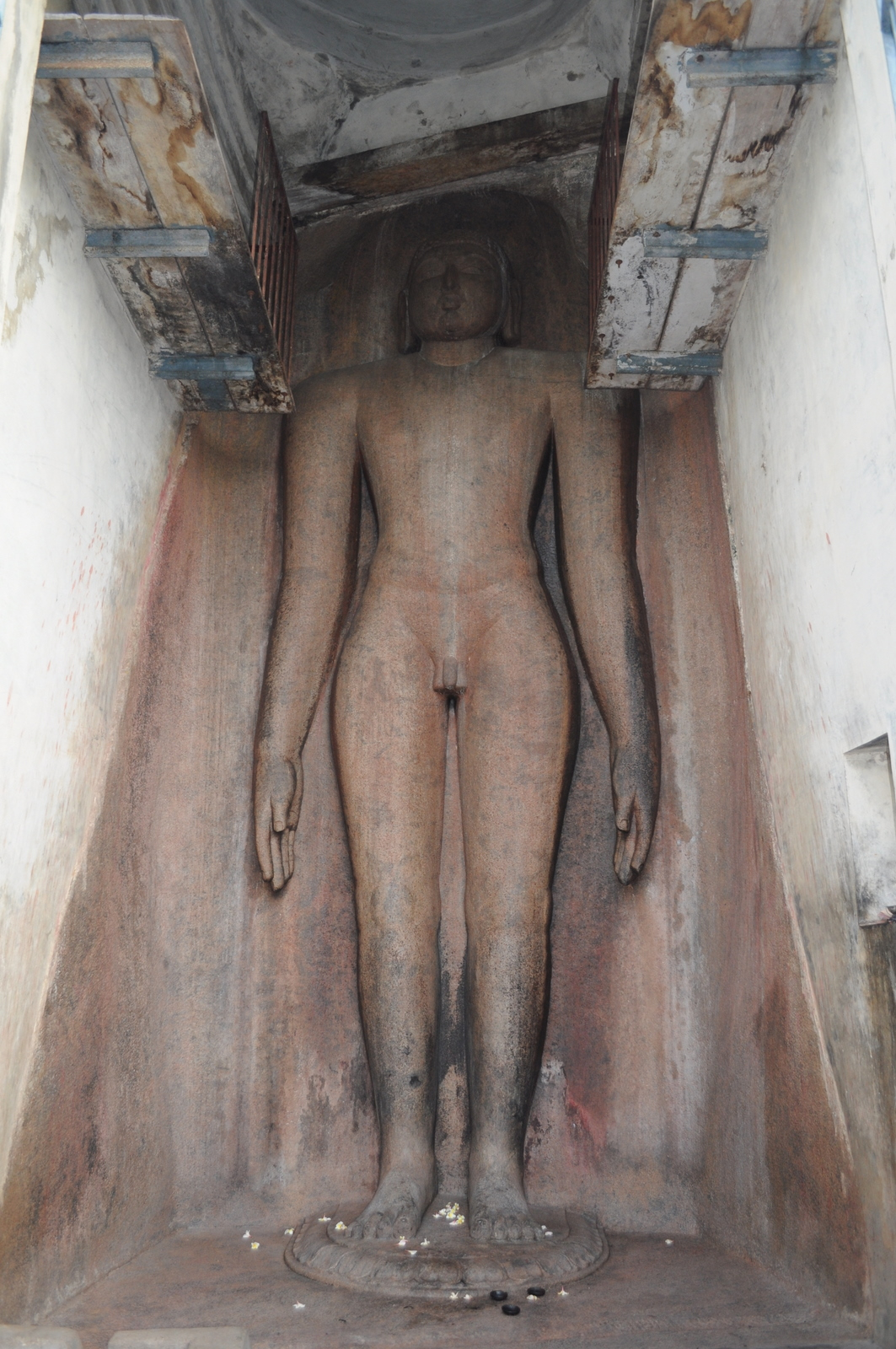
Image of the largest Jain sculpture of Neminatha in Tamil Nadu in Tirumalai temple

The most important festival of the Annamalaiyar temple is celebrated during the Tamil month of Karthikai, between November and December, concluding with the celebration of Karthikai Deepam. A huge lamp is lit in a cauldron, containing three tons of ghee, at the top of the Annamalai hills during the Deepam. To mark the occasion, the festival deity of Annamalaiyar circumambulates the mountain. Inscriptions indicate that the festival was celebrated as early as the Chola period (850–1280) and was expanded to ten days in the twentieth century.

Every full moon, tens of thousands of pilgrims worship Annamalaiyar by circumambulating the Annamalai hill barefoot. The circumambulation covers a distance of 14 kilometres (8.7 mi), and is referred as Girivalam. According to Hindu legend, the walk removes sins, fulfils desires and helps achieve freedom from the cycle of birth and rebirth. Offerings are made in a string of tanks, shrines, pillared meditation halls, springs and caves around the hill.

Tirumalai is an ancient Jain temple complex in the outskirts of Tiruvannamalai that houses three Jain caves, four Jain temples and a 16 feet (4.9 m) high sculpture of Neminatha dated from the 12th century and the tallest Jain image in Tamil Nadu.

The Ramana Ashram and ashram of Yogi Ramsuratkumar, located around the Annamalai hill are popular visitor attractions of Tiruvannamalai. The Sathanur Dam over the Thenpennai river located 20 km (12 mi) southwest of the city is a prominent picnic spot. This 786.37 m Dam is 44.81m high and can store 7,321,000,000 cu ft or 207,300,000 cubic meters of water. A scenic park is also present adjacent to this dam. Ulagalantha Perumal Temple in Tirukoilur, situated 36 km (22 mi) south of Tiruvannamalai and Thiruvarangam are prominent Vishnu temples that are located around Tiruvannamalai.

== Transport ==
The Puducherry – Krishnagiri national highway, NH 77 and the Vellore – Tuticorin Port National highway NH 38 pass through Tiruvannamalai. The city has eight arterial roads that connects it to other towns. The Tiruvannamalai municipality maintains a total length of 75.26 km (46.76 mi). The city has 9.068 km (5.635 mi) concrete roads, 50.056 km (31.103 mi) BT roads, 7.339 km (4.560 mi) of WBM roads and 8.797 km (5.466 mi) earthen roads. A total of 452 roads is maintained by the State Highways Department.

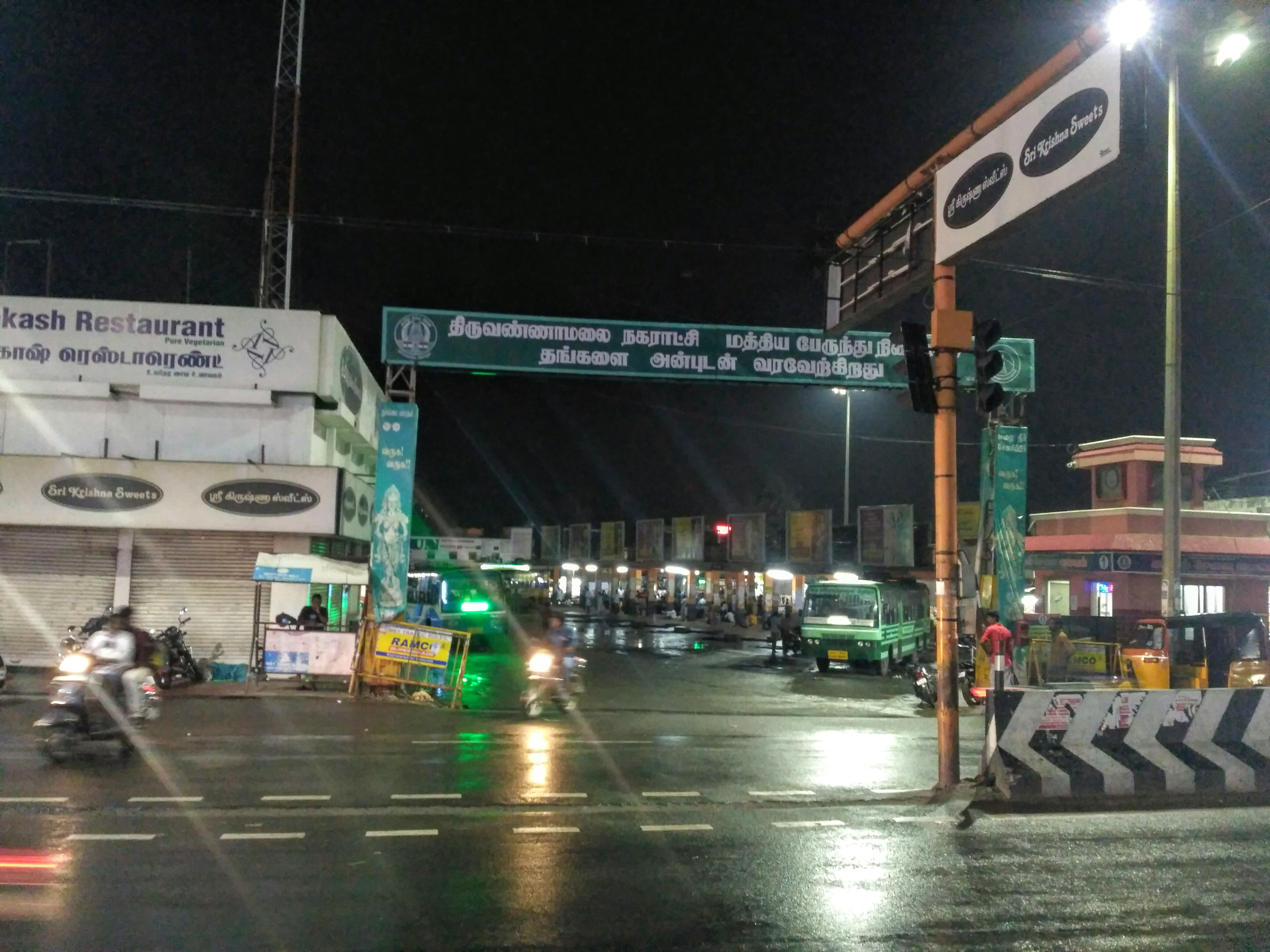
View of a town's central bus stand

Tiruvannamalai is served by the city bus service operated by the TNSTC, which provides connectivity within the town and the suburbs. There are private operated mini-bus services that cater to the local transport needs of the town. The main bus stand covers an area of 2 acres (8,100 m^{2}) and is located in the heart of the town. There are regular inter-city bus services to Tiruvannamalai. The TNSTC operates daily services connecting various cities to Tiruvannamalai. The corporation operates a computerised reservation centre in the bus stand of the town. The SETC operates long-distance buses connecting the town to important cities like Chennai, Puducherry and Bengaluru. The major inter city bus routes from the town are to cities and towns like Chennai, Bengaluru, Vettavalam, Villupuram, Puducherry, Arani, Tindivanam, Gingee, Tirukoilur, Avalurpet, Kanchipuram, Chengam, Sathanur, Sankarapuram and Manalurpet.

Tiruvannamalai railway station is located in the rail head from Katpadi to Villupuram and falls under the Tiruchchirapalli division of the Southern Railway. The Rameshwaram-Tirupati bi-weekly expresses connects Tiruvannamalai to the cities of Madurai and Tirupati in either directions. There are also passenger trains running either side from Katpadi to Villupuram.

The nearest airport is at Chennai, which is located 172 km (107 mi) from the town.

== Municipal administration and politics ==
Municipality officials
Mayor	Nirmala Velmaran
Commissioner	Mujibeer Rahumaan P M N
Deputy-Mayor	Rajangam Sundaramoorthy
Elected members
Member of Legislative Assembly	E.V.Velu
Member of Parliament	C. N. Annadurai

The Tiruvannamalai municipality was established in 1886 during British times. It was promoted to a second-grade municipal municipality in 1959, first grade in 1974, selection grade in 1998 and special grade in 2008. The municipality has 39 wards and there is an elected councillor for each of those wards. The functions of the municipality are devolved into six departments: general administration/personnel, Engineering, Revenue, Public Health, city planning and Information Technology (IT). All these departments are under the control of a Municipal Commissioner who is the executive head. The legislative powers are vested in a body of 39 members, one each from the 39 wards. The legislative body is headed by an elected chairperson assisted by a deputy chairperson.

Tiruvannamalai comes under the Tiruvannamalai assembly constituency and it elects a member to the Tamil Nadu Legislative Assembly once every five years. From the 1977 elections, the assembly seat was won by Dravida Munnetra Kazhagam (DMK) seven times during the 1977, 1989, 1996, 2001, 2006, 2011 and 2016 elections, the Indian National Congress party three times during the 1980, 1984 and 1991 elections. The current MLA of the constituency is E.V. Velu from DMK.

During the 1957 elections, Tiruvannamalai was a part of Tiruvannamalai parliamentary constituency and was held by an independent. From the 1962 to 2004 elections, the city was part of Tirupattur constituency. The Dravida Muneetra Kazhagam (DMK) won the seat nine times during the 1962, 1967, 1971, 1977, 1980, 1996, 1998, 1999 and 2004 elections and the Indian National Congress won it three times during the 1984, 1989 and 1991 elections and AIADMK once during the 2014 elections. From the 2009 elections, Tiruvannamalai is a part of the Tiruvannamalai (Lok Sabha constituency) – it has the following six assembly constituencies – Jolarpet, Tirupattur, Chengam (SC), Tiruvannamalai, Kilpennathur and Kalasapakkam. The current Member of Parliament from the constituency is C N Annadurai from the DMK party.

Law and order in the town is maintained by the Tiruvannamalai sub division of the Tamil Nadu Police headed by a Deputy Superintendent (DSP). There are three police stations in the town, one of them being an all-women police station. There are special units like prohibition enforcement, district crime, social justice and human rights, district crime records and special branch that operate at the district level police division headed by a Superintendent of Police (SP).

=== Suburbs ===
- Ariyathur
- Kilnathur
- Madipakkam
- Mel-chengam
- Nallavanpalayam
- Pallikondapattu
- Saron
- Thenimalai
- Thenmathur
- Thenral Nagar
- Vengikkal

== Education and utility services ==
There are 45 elementary schools, 12 high schools and 28 higher secondary schools in Tiruvannamalai. There are seven arts & science colleges, six engineering colleges, 1 law college and 2 medical college in the town. Electricity supply to Tiruvannamalai is regulated and distributed by the Tamil Nadu Electricity Board (TNEB). The town along with its suburbs forms the Tiruvannamalai Electricity Distribution Circle. Water supply is provided by the municipality of Tiruvannamalai from the Thenpennai river and Samuthiram through feeders located in various parts of the town. In the period 2000–2001, a total of 12.5 million litres of water was supplied every day for households in the town. About 52 metric tonnes of solid waste are collected from Tiruvannamalai every day by door-to-door collection and subsequently the source segregation and dumping is carried out by the sanitary department of the municipality. The coverage of solid waste management had an efficiency of 75% in 2001. The town has underground drainage system which came to existence fully in the year 2013–2014 and the sewerage system for disposal of sullage is through septic tanks, open drains and public conveniences. The municipality maintains a total of 192.24 km (119.45 mi) of storm water drains in Tiruvannamalai. There are three government hospitals, one southern railway hospital, two municipal maternity hospitals, two Siddha hospitals, five health centres and 126 private hospitals and clinics that take care of the health care needs of the citizens. There are a total of 13,570 street lamps in Tiruvannamalai: 2,496 sodium lamps, 1061 mercury vapour lamps, 10,010 tube lights and 112 high mast beam lamp. The municipality operates seven markets, namely the Jothi flower market, vegetable market and uzhavar santhai, poomalai market, Angalamman koil market, Perumbakkam road market that cater to the needs of the town and the rural areas around it.
