= Madipakkam, Tiruvannamalai =

Madipakkam மடிப்பாக்கம் Madumaanagar
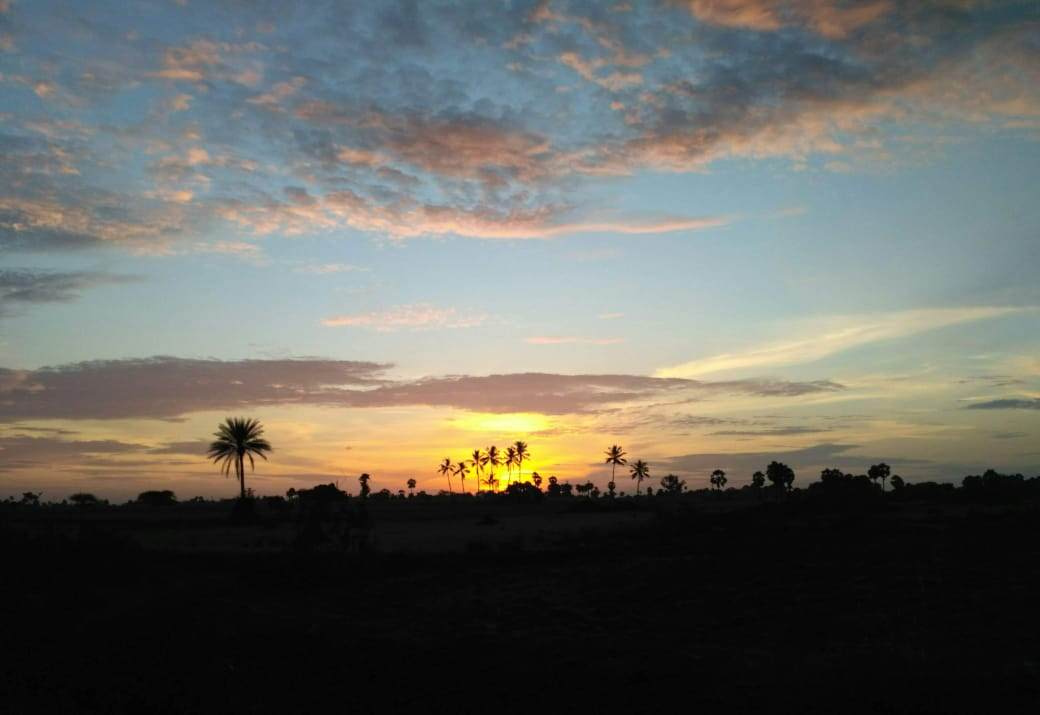
- Sunrise view at Madipakkam village, with palm trees silhouetted against the morning sky.

- Location in Tamil Nadu, India Madipakkam (India)
- Coordinates: 12.6788°N 79.6080°E
- Country: India
- State: Tamil Nadu
- District: Thiruvannamalai
- Taluk: Cheyyar
- Vehicle Registration: TN-25

Government
  - Type: Village Panchayat
  - Body: Madipakkam Gram Panchayat

Area
  - Land: 6.024 km^{2} (2.326 sq mi)
- Highest elevation: 141 m (463 ft)
- Lowest elevation: 4 m (13 ft)

Population (2011)
  - Total: 1,262
  - Density: 209.5/km^{2} (542.6/sq mi)

Gender
  - Male: 813
  - Female: 809
- Time zone: UTC+5:30 (IST)
- PIN: 631701
- Area code: 91
- Nearest City: Cheyyar
- Lok Sabha constituency: Arani
- Vidhan Sabha constituency: Cheyyar

Madipakkam is a village located in the Tiruvannamalai district of Tamil Nadu, in southern India. According to local tradition and historical references, the village was originally known as Madumaanagar. The name is derived from Tamil, where "Madu" means barrier, "Maa" means great or large, and "Nagar" means town; together, it can be interpreted as "the great barrier town". One of the village's notable landmarks is the ancient Rudra Bhavanishwara Temple, situated on the banks of the large Madipakkam Lake.

== History ==
Madipakkam has a long-standing historical and cultural significance. According to 2022 archaeological findings, two stone inscriptions discovered at the Rudra Bhavanishwara Temple indicate that the village has been continuously inhabited since at least the 10th century CE, during the reign of the Chola dynasty.

The inscriptions were discovered during a field inspection carried out by the Tamil Nadu Cultural Heritage Research (TCHR) team. One of the stones is well-preserved, while the other is partially broken, with some portions remaining illegible.

The inscriptions record:

Stone 1: "பார்த்தி வேந்திர வர்மனின் 3-வது ஆட்சியில் காலியூர் கோட்டையைச் சேர்ந்த காழியூர் நாட்டு மடிப்பாக்கத்து மகாதேவரான சிவனுக்கு இரண்டு வேளையும் பலி பூஜை செய்யப்படும்.பலி ஏற்பாடுகளை தென்வீதி விடங்கனான் வானவன் மாராயனேன் செய்தார்."

(In the 3rd year of Parthivendra Varman's reign, arrangements were made for conducting two daily Sri Bali Poojas to Mahadeva (Lord Shiva) of Madipakkam in the four corners of the temple, accompanied by music, under Kazhiyur Town. The arrangements for the Bali Pooja were made by Vaanavan Maarayenen of the South Street of Vidangan.)

Stone 2: "கோயிலில் தொடர்ந்து வழிபாடு செய்ய நந்தவனம் ஏற்படுத்தப்பட்டு, அதனை பராமரிக்க நிலம் வழங்கப்பட்டுள்ளது மற்றும் தர்மத்தை காப்பவர்களின் பாதத்தை தன் தலைமேல் வைத்து போற்றுவதாகவும் குறிப்பிடப்பட்டுள்ளது"

(To ensure regular worship in the temple, a sacred flower garden (Nandhavana) was established, and land was allocated for its upkeep. The donor declared his devotion by revering the feet of those who uphold dharma, symbolically placing them on his head.)

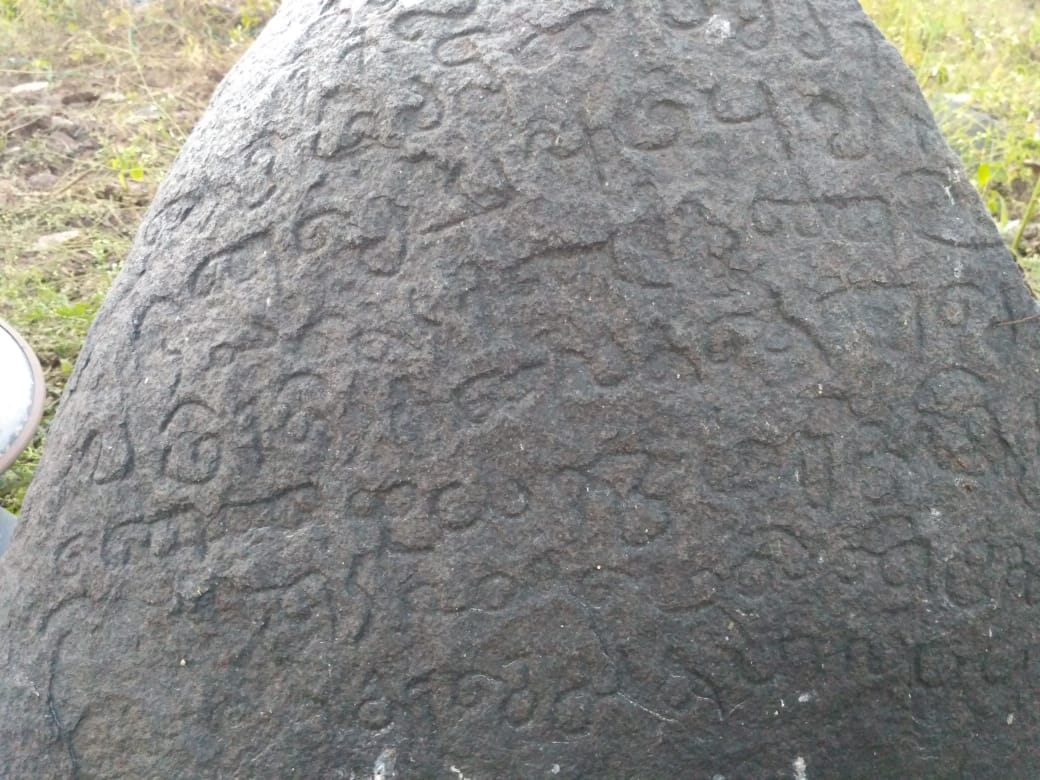
Inscription 1; script: Vatteluttu with Grantha.

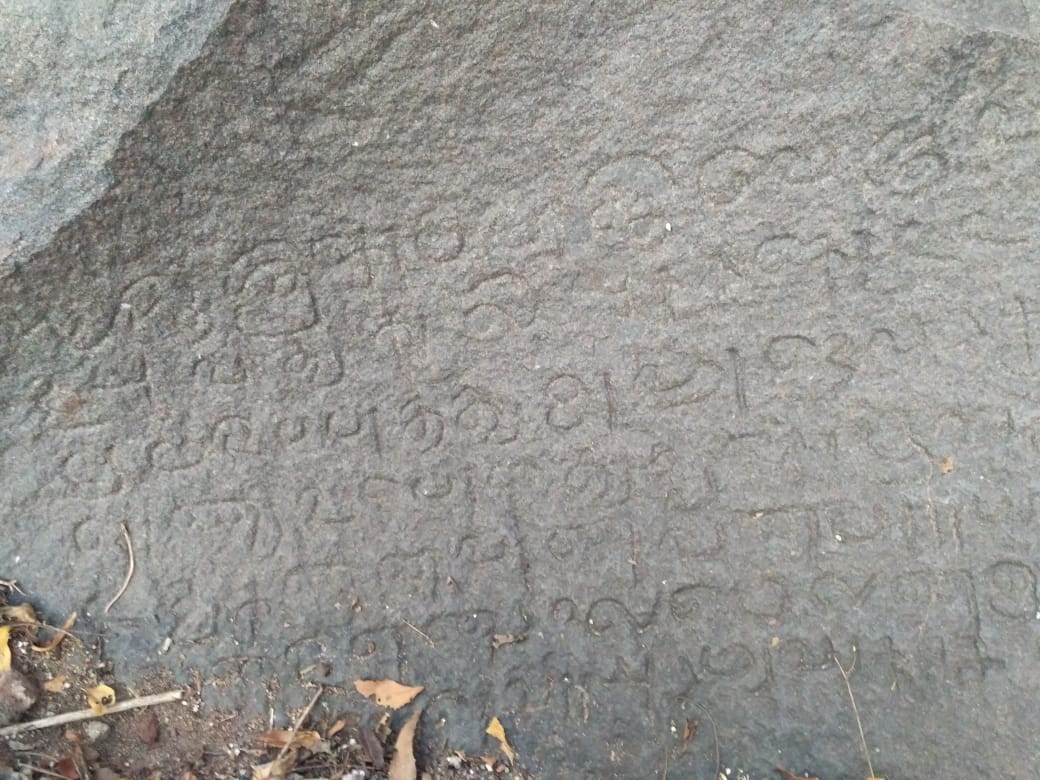
inscription 2; script: Vatteluttu with Grantha.

The inscriptions are written using ancient Tamil scripts (from Tamil-Brahmi evolving into Vattezhuthu and Grantha-Tamil mixed script) commonly used during the Chola period.

Sri Bali Pooja was an ancient form of ritual worship in Hindu temples, especially during the Chola period. The term "Bali" refers to symbolic offerings such as cooked rice, fruits, flowers, or turmeric-mixed rice. "Maaraayan" denotes an honorific title for experts in music.

These inscriptions suggest that Madipakkam, historically known as Madumaanagar, has been continuously inhabited for over a millennium and played a role in local cultural and religious practices.

== Geography ==
Madipakkam is a village in Cheyyar taluk of Tiruvannamalai district, Tamil Nadu, and lies within the historic North Arcot region. It is located about 16 km from Cheyyar, the sub-district headquarters, and around 116 km from Tiruvannamalai, the district headquarters. According to the 2011 census of India, the total area of the village is approximately 602.4 hectares.

The terrain is predominantly agricultural, with farmlands, ponds, and patches of natural vegetation. This landscape supports local biodiversity and sustains the agrarian economy.

== Climate ==
Madipakkam experiences a tropical climate. Summers are generally hot and dry, while the monsoon season brings moderate rainfall between June and September. Winters are relatively mild. The climate supports agriculture as a primary occupation.

Climate data for Madipakkam (Cheyyar Taluk) – Climate data (proxy: Tiruvannamalai, 2023)
Month	Jan	Feb	Mar	Apr	May	Jun	Jul	Aug	Sep	Oct	Nov	Dec	Year
Mean daily maximum °F	86	93	99	100	100	99	95	97	93	91	84	82	93
Mean daily minimum °F	64	66	72	77	81	81	79	79	77	73	72	70	74
Average precipitation inches	0.15	0.24	2.72	1.18	6.41	5.03	3.06	2.66	3.71	3.87	9.10	1.53	39.66
Mean daily maximum °C	30	34	37	38	38	37	35	36	34	33	29	28	34
Mean daily minimum °C	18	19	22	25	27	27	26	26	25	23	22	21	23
Average precipitation mm	3.80	6.00	69.00	30.00	162.70	127.80	77.85	67.45	94.17	98.34	231.09	38.93	1,007.13
Source: WeatherAPI – Tiruvannamalai “Averages year by year” (2023)

== Infrastructure and Environment ==
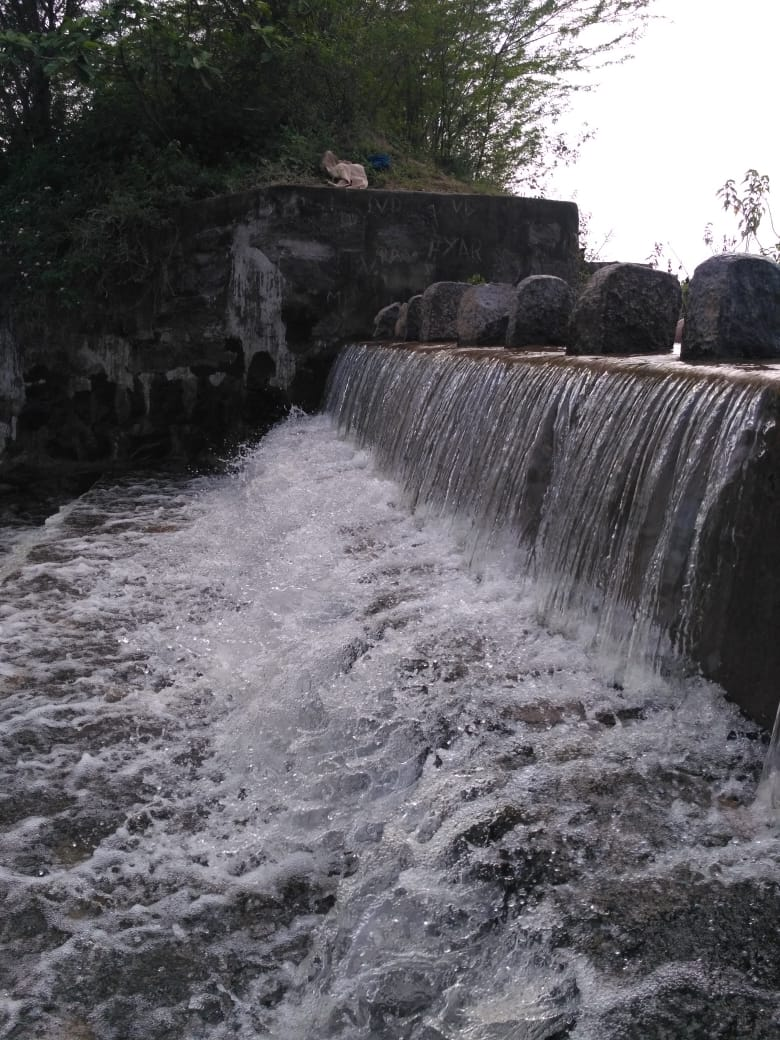
The spillway of the Madipakkam big lake, which regulates excess water flow during heavy rainfall.

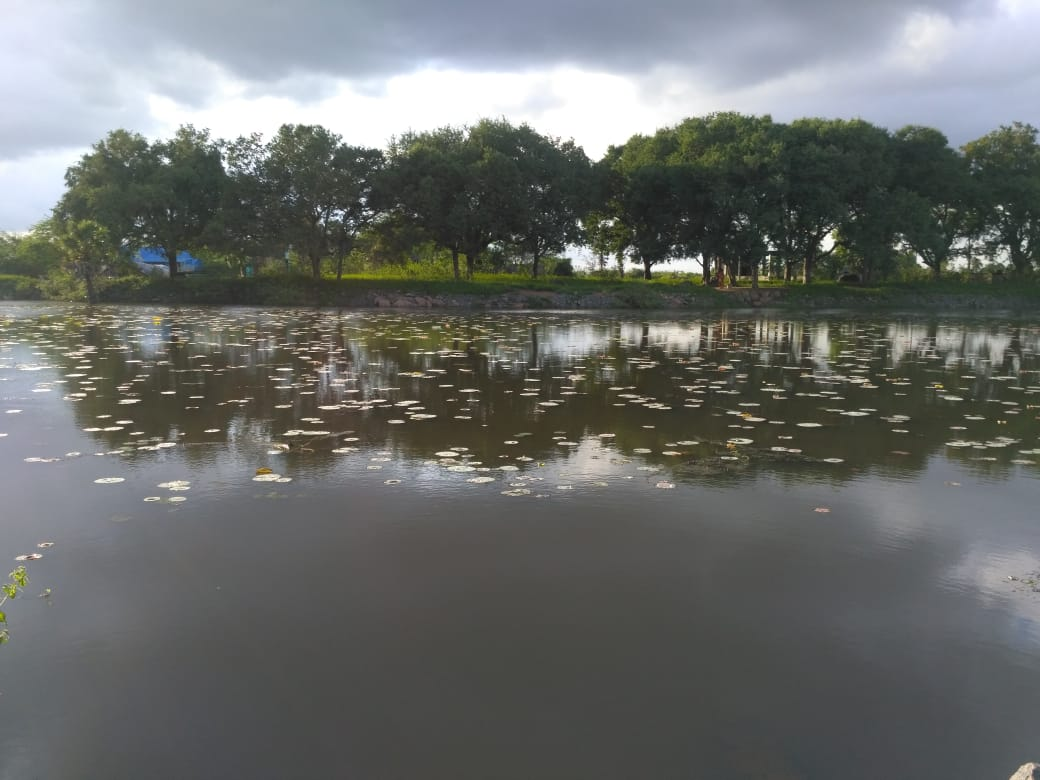
The central pond of Madipakkam, featuring lotus growth, serves as a key source of potable water for the village.

Madipakkam is notable for its water bodies, which play an important role in the village's ecology and agriculture. The village contains one large lake and a medium-sized lake, along with several smaller ponds and numerous wells on agricultural lands. The large lake receives inflow from neighbouring villages and has a spillway-like outlet that releases water during heavy rainfall. On either side of the lake are two supply channels (madhagu), which are used for irrigation. The medium-sized lake provides water to the other parts of the village. Both lakes are also used by the municipality to supply drinking water to residents.

In the centre of the village there is a pond with a well and lotus growth, which is a source of potable water and a local landmark. These water bodies also attract a variety of migratory and local bird species during the monsoon months. A canal flowing from the main lake connects to the Cheyyar River.

Madipakkam has a government middle school (classes 1 to 8) that serves local students. The village also contains several temples, including the historic Rudhra Bhavanishwarar Temple, Pillaiyar Koil, Bajanai Koil, and Angalamman Koil, which are important to the cultural life of the community.

Wildlife occasionally sighted in and around the village includes small wild animals such as the wild boar (kāṭṭu paṉṟi in Tamil). During the monsoon season, the village landscape becomes lush with greenery, creating a forest-like environment that supports seasonal biodiversity.

== Demographics ==
As per the 2011 Census, Madipakkam village in Tamil Nadu had a total population of 1,262, with 625 males and 637 females, resulting in a sex ratio of 1,020 females for every 1,000 males. The village comprises 291 households.

Madipakkam has a diverse religious community with long-standing harmony of Hinduism,Islam and Christianity

Literacy in Madipakkam as per (2011 Census)
Category	Population (%)
Male Literate	46%
Female Literate	39%
Illiterate	15%

The official language of the village is Tamil. The Muslim population in the village commonly speaks both Tamil and Urdu.

== Economy and Industrialization ==
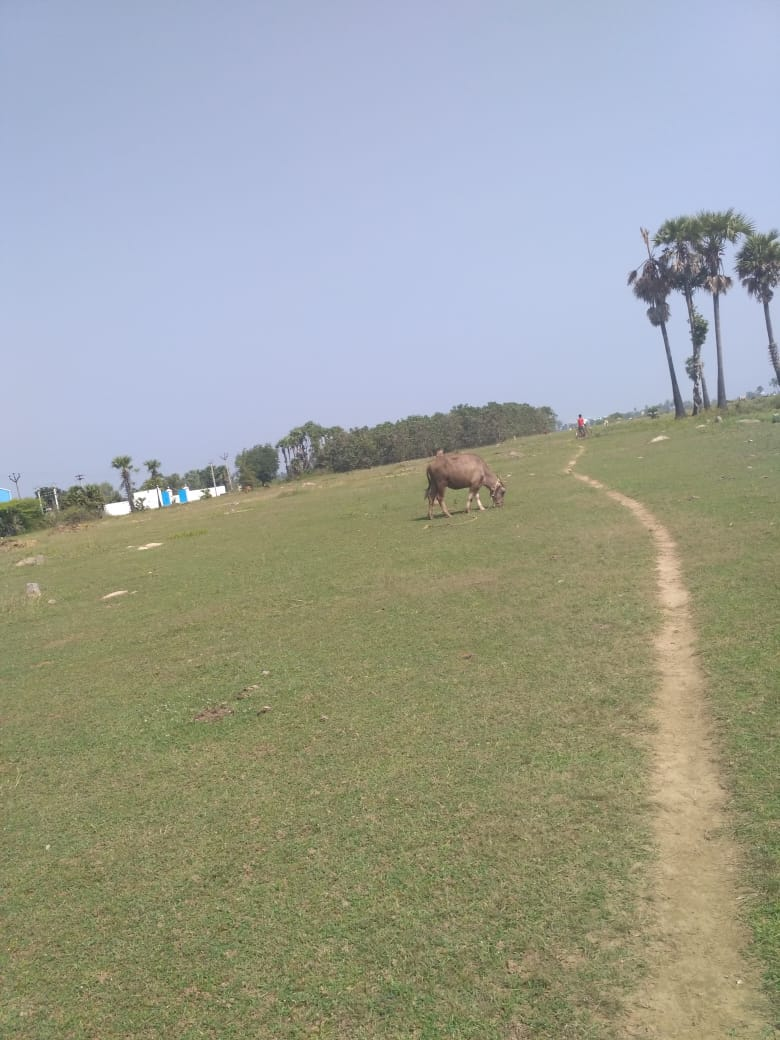
Cow grazing in the open grassland of Madipakkam.

Agriculture continues to play an important role in Madipakkam's economy. Major crops include paddy, groundnut, black gram, sesame, cowpea, finger millet, green gram, and sugarcane. Vegetables such as chili, brinjal, okra, tomato, ridge gourd, bottle gourd, and snake gourd are also cultivated. Livestock rearing and dairy activities provide supplementary income to farming households.

Over the past two decades, industrialization has significantly changed the employment landscape. Many local residents, including women and men, work in the SIPCOT Industrial Estate, Cheyyar, as well as in various companies along State Highway 116.

Major industries in the area include:

- Voltech Manufacturing Company
- Velvin Rengo Containers Private Limited
- Ashley Alteams India Ltd
- Rockman Industries Limited
- Forech India (P) Limited
- M&B Engineering Ltd (Phenix Construction Technologies Unit)
- SCHWING’s Global Manufacturing Hub
- Mahindra SUV Proving Track (MSPT)

These industries provide direct and indirect employment opportunities for thousands of people. The growth of SIPCOT has helped reduce outward migration, as residents increasingly find work locally rather than seeking employment in Chennai or other cities.

== Transport ==
Madipakkam is well connected by road to nearby towns and villages. Tamil Nadu State Transport Corporation (TNSTC) and private bus operators, including Balaji Bus Service, Ukkal Town Bus, and Kanchipuram Town Bus, operate regular routes linking the village with Cheyyar, Arni, Kanchipuram, Vandavasi, and Tiruvannamalai. These buses are the primary mode of transport for residents and connect intermediate villages.

The village is connected to State Highway 116 (SH-116) and other arterial routes passing through Cheyyar, ensuring access to the district headquarters and nearby commercial centres.

The nearest railway station is Kanchipuram railway station, with Arni Road railway station serving the region at a distance of about 34 km on the Katpadi–Villupuram line. The nearest major railhead is Katpadi Junction (about 70 km), with connections to Chennai, Bengaluru, and other metropolitan centres. The nearest airport is Chennai International Airport, approximately 110 km from Madipakkam.

The nearest airport is Chennai International Airport, approximately 110 km from Madipakkam.

== Landmarks and Surroundings ==
In the nearby town of Cheyyar, the Vedapureeswarar Temple is a notable Paadal Petra Sthalam, known for its Dravidian architecture and devotional legends, while the Patcheeswarar temple dates back to the Pallava period (7th century CE). The seasonal Cheyyar River provides irrigation support to the region.

In the nearby town of Kanchipuram, located about 25 km from Madipakkam, visitors can explore famous temples such as the Kailasanathar Temple and Varadaraja Perumal Temple, which are renowned for their Dravidian architecture and historical significance. Kanchipuram is also known as the "City of a Thousand Temples" and serves as a major cultural and religious center in the region.

== See also ==
- Cheyyar
- Tiruvannamalai district
- Tamil Nadu
- Chola Dynasty
