= Purisai =

Coordinates: 12.578988°N 79.585188°E

Purisai Purisai village (புரிசை)
- Village
- Interactive map of Purisai
- Country: India
- State: Tamil Nadu
- District: Thiruvanamalai district

Population (2011)
  - Total: 2,460

Languages
  - Official: Tamil
- Time zone: UTC+5:30 (IST)
- PIN: 604401
- Telephone code: 91-4182
- Vehicle registration: TN25
- Lok Sabha constituency: Arani (Lok Sabha constituency)
- Vidhan Sabha constituency: Cheyyar (State Assembly Constituency)

Purisai is a village panchayat of Cheyyar Taluk. The village is famous for temples and festivals.

== Location ==
It is located 79 km towards East from District headquarters Thiruvannamalai. 105 km from State capital Chennai, Tamil Nadu, India. Purisai is surrounded by Vandavasi Taluk towards South, Cheyyar Taluk towards North, Pernamallur Taluk towards west, Uttiramerur Taluk towards East. It is one of 219 villages in Cheyyar Block. Vandavasi, Tiruvethipuram, Uthiramerur, Kanchipuram are the nearby Cities to Purisai. Purisai has Agriculture Bank, Government Higher Secondary School, Elementary School and a Private CBSE School. Agriculture is main source for this Village. Purisai has 2 major lakes which acts as source for irrigation . Cheyyar Sugar Mill, Cheyyar Polytechnic, Cheyyar Arts and Science College are located within a five kilometers radius.

== Transport ==
Katpadi Jn Rail Way Station is major railway station 72 km near to Purisai. However, Central Government has already approved a new track which will pass through Purisai. Buses frequently available from Cheyyar and Vandavasi, Direct buses are available from/to Arni, Bangalore, Chennai, Kanchipuram, Melmaruvathur, Puducherry, Thindivanam and Vellore.

== Temples ==
Historic Agastheeswarar and Ellai Amman temples are located here. Temples for Lord Perumal, Anjaneyar & several Lord Vinayaga & Mugurgan are also found here. Purisai is one of the only villages where you can find a temple for Draupadi Amman.

This temple is one of the Vaippu Sthalam / Paadal Petra Sthalam. The temple is revered in the versus of Saiva Nayanars in the 6th-9th century CE and are amongst the greatest Shiva temples of the continent. Sundarar or Sundaramurthi (Tamil சுந்தரர், 8th century CE)mentioned this temple in his Tirumurai (7-12-6)

"தென்னூர் கைம்மைத் திருச்சுழி யல்திருக் கானப்பேர் பன்னூர் புக்குறை யும்பர மர்க்கிடம் பாய்நலம் என்னூர் எங்கள் பிரான்உறை யுந்திருத் தேவனூர் பொன்னூர் நாட்டுப் பொன்னூர் புரிசைநாட்டுப் புரிசையே."

== Festivals and events ==
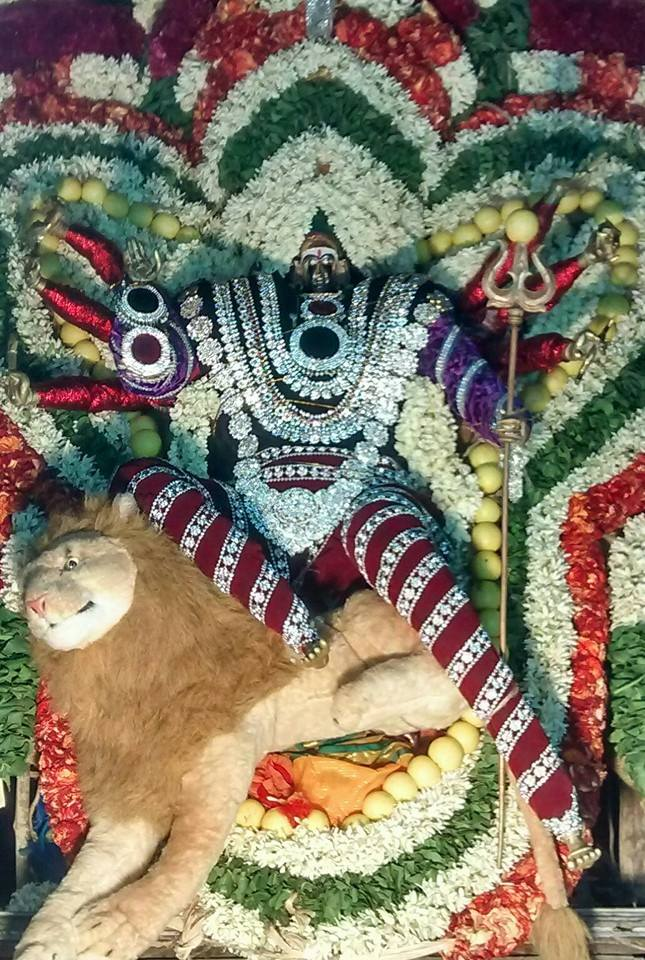
During Aadi month festival at Ellaiamman Temple on 18/7/2014

12 days of Panguni festival in Agatheeswarar temple, Adi festival and Full Moon day celebration in Ellai amman temple adds crown to Purisai village and it is still being considered as family gathering festivals across all religions. Purisai is considered as one of very few villages where Therukoothu culture is still alive through few Kalaimamani award winners. Special School for Therukoothu is also located in this Village.
