= Vaazhl (soundtrack) =

Soundtrack album by Pradeep Kumar
- Released: 9 July 2021
- Recorded: 2019–2021
- Studio: Krimson Avenue Studios, Chennai; 2 BarQ Studios, Chennai; Sapthaa Records, Kochi; Voice and Vision Studios, Chennai; Gray Spark Audio, Pune
- Genre: Feature film soundtrack
- Length: 42:45
- Language: Tamil
- Label: Sony Music
- Producer: Pradeep Kumar

Pradeep Kumar chronology
Andhaghaaram (2020)	Vaazhl (2021)	Veyil (2022)

Singles from Vaazhl
- 1. "Aahaa" Released: 7 September 2020; 2. "Feel Song" Released: 27 January 2021

Vaazhl is the soundtrack album to the 2021 film of the same name directed by Arun Prabu Purushothaman and produced by Sivakarthikeyan under his banner Sivakarthikeyan Productions and Madhuram Pictures. The soundtrack consisted of nine songs composed by Pradeep Kumar, with lyrics written by Muthamil, Kutti Revathi, Arun Prabu and Pradeep himself. The album was preceded by two singles—"Aahaa" and "Feel Song"—before the soundtrack was released on 9 July 2021 under the Sony Music India label.

== Development ==
The film's music is composed by playback singer-turned-composer Pradeep Kumar who also wrote the lyrics for the songs along with the director Arun Prabu Purushothaman and lyricists Muthamil and Kutti Revathi, who worked with the director in Aruvi (2017). Prabu described the film's narrative as a musical despite being set in a mixed genre and is considered an integral part of the film.

Like the previous film, Arun Prabu employed a similar technique for the music of Vaazhl, where the music was designed during the pre-production stage. Since the script had several musical notations, he could not have time to discuss with Pradeep for each specific notation. However, Pradeep had composed the music and score even before the film began production, so that Prabu would shoot and edit the film respective to the songs, instead of using temp tracks. Prabu felt that the songs helped to set the emotions right and also helped the actors to understand the context behind their performance.

Besides traditional orchestral instruments, Pradeep used local instruments such as thavil, nadaswaram, konnakol and flute, and acoustic instruments like theremin, clarinet and latin percussions. Pradeep utilized on working with soul and staccato music that seamlessly transitioned with the narrative of the film and emphasized on natural sounds for the ambient experience. In July 2018, Arun Prabu posted on Twitter about the music sessions of the film with a music team in Cincinnati in the United States. Some of Pradeep's songs were recorded at his home studio during the COVID-19 pandemic lockdown in India, while recording also happened in Chennai, Kochi and Pune. The song "Seemaan Magalai" is based on poet Arunagirinathar's works from Kandar Anuboothi, and also features a dual version performed by Gina Mirenda.

== Release ==
On 7 September 2020, Sony Music India released the lyrical video of the first song "Aahaa", which was released in all digital platforms as the first single. On 27 January 2021, the makers unveiled the second track of the film titled "Feel Song", which was sung by veteran film composer Deva. The album in its entirety was released on 9 July 2021, at a special audio launch event which was streamed live through YouTube. The event also featured the presence of the few cast and crew members, with a musical performance hosted by Pradeep Kumar performing all the songs for the album.

== Reception ==
The album opened to positive reviews from music critics. Critic based at Zoom TV, stated the first song "Aahaa" as an "emotional number with holds a certain amount of breeziness that is beautiful and it also sets the right kind of mood for the film." Baradwaj Rangan of Film Companion South wrote "Pradeep Kumar's score is so much in sync with the narrative. The music seems to be part of the film's DNA as if Arun knew exactly where he wanted sounds and silences. Unlike the usual big background scores, the music just flows with the film. Even when it stands out, it goes with the narrative." Manoj Kumar R of The Indian Express wrote "composer Pradeep Kumar’s meditative score keeps us invested in the narration." Ramya Palisetty of India Today noted that "Pradeep Kumar's background score adds life to the tale".

Ranjani Krishnakumar of Firstpost wrote "Pradeep Kumar's music plays along, tunes across genres blending and swaying effortlessly throughout. It plays a fundamental role in giving the film its timbre. Without the music, the film might have appeared confused or even disjointed. Pradeep Kumar elevates the film, confirms that its staccato nature is deliberate." Sudhir Srinivasan of The New Indian Express added that "Pradeep Kumar's magnificent, experimental score is an incredible source of strength for this film" and the music being "as varied and beautiful as the places in it".

== Track listing ==
No.	Title	Lyrics	Singer(s)	Length
1.	"Aahaa"	Pradeep Kumar	Pradeep Kumar	5:01
2.	"Mudhal Darisanam"	Pradeep Kumar	Bharath Shankar, Pradeep Kumar, Shahid Hameed	2:51
3.	"Feel Song"	Arun Prabu Purushothaman	Deva	3:02
4.	"Inba Visai"	Arun Prabu Purushothaman	Pradeep Kumar, Lalita Vijayakumar	2:55
5.	"Pudhu Vidha Anubavam"	Muthamil, Arun Prabu Purushothaman	Pradeep Kumar, Kalyani Nair	4:10
6.	"Semmaan Magalai" (Version 1)	Arunagirinathar	Pradeep Kumar	4:16
7.	"Vaazha Vaa"	Pradeep Kumar, Arun Prabu Purushothaman	Pradeep Kumar, Radar with A Kay	5:23
8.	"Vaazhl" (Theme)	—	Instrumental	4:54
9.	"Naan"	Kutti Revathi	Pradeep Kumar	5:57
10.	"Semmaan Magalai" (Version 2)	Arunagirinathar	Gina Mirenda, Pradeep Kumar	4:16
Total length:				42:45

== Personnel ==
Credits adapted from Sony Music South:

- All music composed, produced, arranged and programmed by: Pradeep Kumar
- Additional programming and arrangements: Kalyani Nair, M. S. Yeshwanth, Bharath Sankar, Rahul Ramachandran, Satish Raghunathan

Instruments

- Backing vocals: Kalyani Nair, Susha, Vidhya Vijay, Shahid Hameed, Bharath Sankar, Pradeep Kumar
- Guitars: Pradeep Kumar, M. S. Krsna, Gowri Shankar, Tapass Naresh, T. T. Sriram, Susha, Marti Bharath, Jhanu Chanthar
- Drums: Tapass Naresh
- Keys: M. S. Yeshwanth
- Theremin: Carolina Eyck
- Harmonium: Satish Raghunathan
- Nadaswaram: Mylai M. Karthikeyan
- Thavil: V. Prasanth
- Konnakol: Aarvay
- Tabla: Ganapathi, Venkat, Kiran, Sruthi
- Flute: Nikhilram T. P.
- Indian percussions: Ramki, Bharath Sankar
- Latin percussions: Allwyn Jeya Paul

Cincinnati Orchestra

- Bass: Maurice Todd
- Bassoon: Randal Dennler
- Cello: Shu-Li Cheah
- Clarinet: Srila Fukumoto
- Flute: Annie Gordon
- Oboe: Austin Smith
- Trumpets: Audrey Schmid, Dave Zeng
- Trombone: Sean McGhee
- Violins: Jordana Greenberg, Yein Jin
- Viola: Dan Wang
- Orchestra conductor: Issac Selya
- Recording studio: Audiogrotto, Newport, Kentucky
- Recording engineer: Ashley Shepherd Orchestra
- Artist manager: Goutham Iyengar
- Orchestra coordination: Radar With A Kay

Studios (recording, mixing and mastering)

- Krimson Avenue Studios, Chennai: Vishnu M. Namboothiri, K. S. Maniratnam
- 2 BarQ Studios, Chennai: Sujith Sreedhar
- Sapthaa Records, Kochi: Krishnamoorthi
- Voice and Vision Studios, Chennai: Lijesh Kumar
- Gray Spark Audio, Pune: Rahul Ramachandran, Tapass Naresh, Nitin Murali Krishna

== Accolades ==
Award (Note: Awards, festivals and organizations are in alphabetical order.)	Date of ceremony (Note: Date is linked to the article about the awards held that year, wherever possible.)	Category	Recipient(s) and nominee(s)	Result	Ref.
South Indian International Movie Awards	10–11 September 2022	Best Lyricist – Tamil	Arun Prabu Purushothaman – ("Inba Visai")	Nominated	
South Indian International Movie Awards	10–11 September 2022	Best Male Playback Singer – Tamil	Pradeep Kumar – ("Naan")	Nominated	
