= A. Devaraj =

Indian politician

Member of the Legislative Assembly of Tamil Nadu
- Constituency: Cheyyar constituency

Personal details
- Party: Anna Dravida Munnetra Kazhagam

Cheyyar A.Devaraj was an Indian politician and former Member of the Legislative Assembly of Tamil Nadu. He was elected to the Tamil Nadu legislative assembly from Cheyyar constituency as an Anna Dravida Munnetra Kazhagam candidate in 1991. He sweeps the poll and got 60.59% of votes out of 72.36% of total vote percentage. He leads the poll with 35,955 more votes against the Dravida Munnetra Kazhagam candidate. One of the big difference leads in vote difference in that year poll in Tamil Nadu State Assembly Elections.

One of the achievements in his period was he took initiative and spoke in the assembly to bring the SIPCOT industrial estate to Cheyyar and got allotment for the lands.

He was elected as Syndicate and Senate Member for the Madras University. Also he was appointed as a Vice Chancellor [In-Charge] for the Madras University in his period

He was selected as a member of Estimate Committee in the Tamil Nadu Assembly on 13 July 1991
