= Thiruvettisvarar Temple, Thiruvettisvaranpettai =

Religion
- Affiliation: Hinduism
- District: Chennai
- Deity: Lord (Shiva)

Location
- Location: Triplicane
- State: Tamil Nadu
- Country: India
- Interactive map of Thiruvettisvarar Temple, Thiruvettisvaranpettai

Thiruvettisvarar Temple is a Hindu temple dedicated to the deity Shiva, located at Thiruvettisvaranpettai in Triplicane, Chennai in Tamil Nadu, India.

== Vaippu Sthalam ==
It is one of the shrines of the Vaippu Sthalams sung by Tamil Saivite Nayanar Appar. This place is also called as Thirupattinam.

== Presiding deity ==
The presiding deity in the garbhagriha, represented by the lingam, is known as Thiruvettisvarar. The Goddess is known as Maragathavalli. She is also known as Senbagambikai.

== Specialities ==
The presiding deity is flanked by Somaskanda and the Goddess. In the front mandapa of the shrine of the Subramania inscriptions having the songs of Kandar Anuboothy, Shanmuga Kavacham by Pamban Swamigal, Kanda Shasti Kavasam, and Deivamanimalai from Arutpa Ramalinga Swamigal are found. Stucco sculptures of Six Abodes of Murugan are also found. Brahmotsavam, Vaikasi Visakam, Purattasi Amavasaya, Masi Maham and other festivals are celebrated in this temple.

== Other shrines ==
Shrines of Vinayaka, Virabhadra, Balasubramania, Gnanasambandar, Appar, Sundarar, Manikkavacakar and Sekkizhar are found in this temple. The consort of Sangili Nachiar is also found.

== Location ==
Triplicane is a part of Chennai. In the Triplicane High road, next to post office a Vinayaka Temple is found. From there this temple can be reached. It is opened for worship from 6.00 to 11.00 a.m. and 5.00 to 9.00 p.m.
