= Pulavar K. Govindan =

Indian writer, historian, rationalist and politician

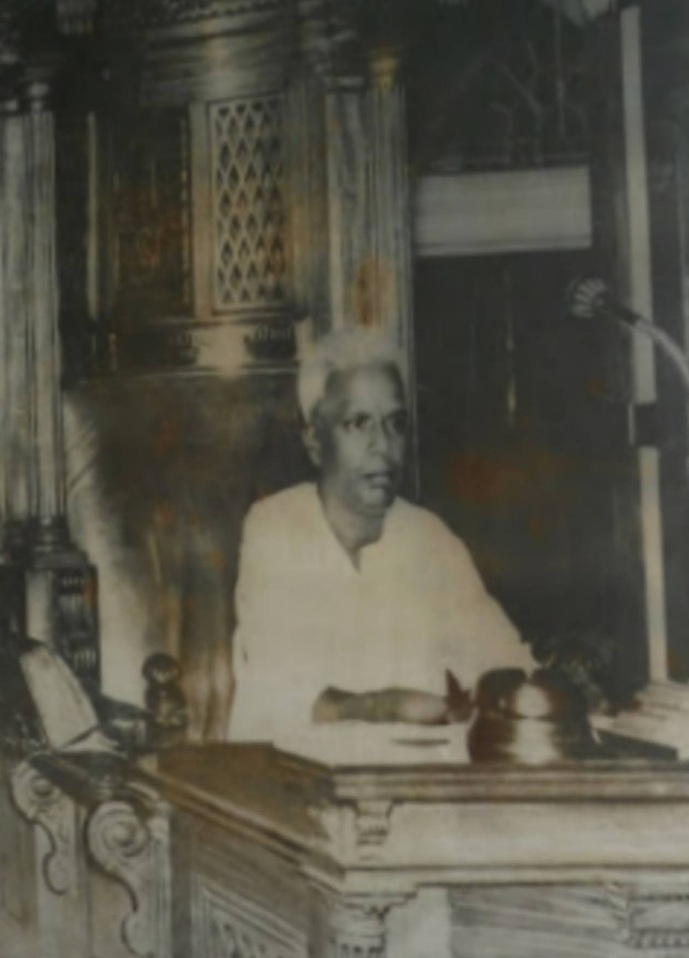

Member of the Madras State Assembly
- In office 1962 - 1980
- Constituency: Cheyyar

Personal details
- Born: K. Govindan; 15 April 1916 Cheyyar, British India
- Died: 2 July 1991 (aged 75) Cheyyar, Tamil Nadu, India
- Party: Dravida Munnetra Kazhagam
- Spouse: Kannammaal Ammaiyar
- Occupation: Writer, Historian, Rationalist, Politician

Pulavar K. Govindan (1916-1991) was a writer, historian, rationalist and politician. He was an elected Member of the Legislative Assembly of Madras State and later, the state of Tamil Nadu. He served as the Deputy Speaker of the Madras Legislative Assembly from 1967 to 1968 and Speaker for two terms from 1969 to 1971 and 1973 to 1977. He has written extensively on Tamil literature and his works were nationalized by the Tamil Nadu State Government in 2007.

== Biography ==
=== Early life: 1916–34 ===
Pulavar K. Govindan was born on 14 April 1916, at Tiruvathipuram, in the then North Arcot District, of the Madras Presidency. His parents were V. Kanga Mudaliar and Sundaram Ammaiyar. He was educated at the Government Boys High School, Cheyyar, from where he graduated in 1934. After his initial schooling, he started learning Tamil literature under the tutelage of Avvai Su. Duraisamy Pillai, who was an authority in many literary texts.

Pulavar soon organized a group of Avvai Duraisamy's students into the Avvai Thamizh Maanavar Kazhagam (Avvai Tamil Students' Association) in 1935. This association was instrumental in publishing the ingurunooru (Tamil: ஐங்குறுநூறு) text of Avvai Duraisamy. The first anniversary of the Avvai Tamil Students' Association was held over three days (24-26 May 1936). This was a grand occasion, with the attendance of the prominent Tamil scholars of the time, such as Maraimalayadigal, Karandhai Thamizhvel, Umamageswaram Pillai, Na.Mu, Venkatasamy Nattar, and Gnaniyaradigal. 1936 also marked the year Pulavar wedded his cousin Kannammaal.

Pulavar Govindan's private Tamil studies culminated in his successful completion of the "Tamil Vidwan Examination." Denouncing the Sanskrit term "Vidwan," he adopted the Tamil word "Pulavar" as his title. Though many followed him in changing the title, K. Govindan soon became eminent enough to be simply addressed as "Pulavar." He started working as a teacher.

== See also ==
- Cheyyar
