= Madipakkam =

Madipakkam may refer to:

- Madipakkam, Chennai, Tamil Nadu, India
- Madipakkam, Tiruvannamalai, Tamil Nadu, India
