= Agastheesvarar Temple, Purisai =

Shiva temple in Tiruvannamalai district, Tamil Nadu, India

- Agastheesvarar Temple, Purisai, Tiruvannamalai district, Tamil Nadu

Religion
- Affiliation: Hinduism
- District: Tiruvannamalai
- Deity: Agastheesvarar
- Festival: Maha Shivaratri

Location
- Location: Purisai
- State: Tamil Nadu
- Country: India
- Interactive map of Agastheesvarar Temple, Purisai
- Coordinates: 12.5790°N 79.5852°E

Architecture
- Type: Dravidian architecture
- Completed

Specifications
- Temple: One
- Elevation: 109.02 m (358 ft)

Agastheesvarar Temple, Purisai is a Siva temple in Purisai in Tiruvannamalai district in Tamil Nadu (India).

== Vaippu Sthalam ==
It is one of the shrines of the Vaippu Sthalams sung by Tamil Saivite Nayanar Sundarar.

== Presiding deity ==
The presiding deity is Agastheesvarar. The Goddess is known as Akilandesvari.

== Location ==
This temple is located between Vandavasi and Cheyyar. There is also another Purisai near Thakkolam.
