= Thirumakaraleeswarar temple =

Thirumakaraleeswarar Temple
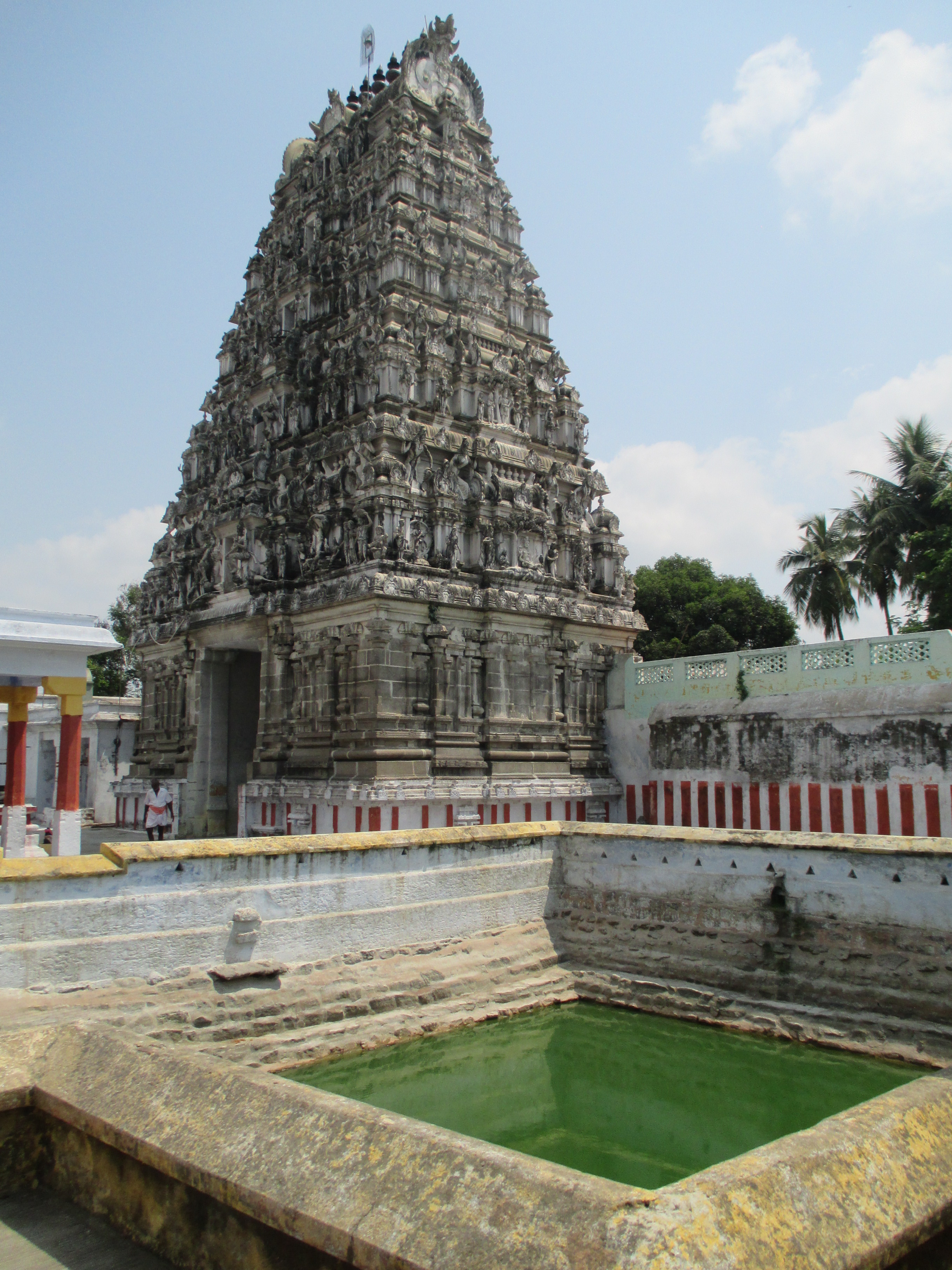

- Location in Tamil Nadu

Religion
- Affiliation: Hinduism
- District: Kanchipuram
- Deity: Thirumakaraleeswarar (Shiva)

Location
- State: Tamil Nadu
- Country: India
- Coordinates: 12°43′06″N 79°45′17″E

Architecture
- Type: Dravidian architecture

Thirumakaraleeswarar Temple (also called Thirumagaral Temple and Thirumakaral Easwarar Temple) is a Hindu temple dedicated to the deity Shiva, located in Magaral, a village in Kanchipuram district in the South Indian state of Tamil Nadu. Shiva is worshipped as Thirumakaraleeswarar, and is represented by the lingam. His consort Parvati is depicted as Tribuvananayagi. The presiding deity is revered in the 7th-century CE Tamil Saiva canonical work, the Tevaram, written by Tamil saint poets known as the Nayanmars and classified as Paadal Petra Sthalam.

The temple complex covers two acres and it houses a five-tier gateway tower known as gopurams, axially facing the Thirumakaraleeswarar shrine. The temple has a number of shrines, with those of Thirumakaraleeswarar and his consort Tribuvananayagi being the most prominent.

The original complex is believed to have been built by Cholas, while the present masonry structure was built during the Vijayanagar Empire Nayak during the 16th century. In modern times, the temple is maintained and administered by the Hindu Religious and Charitable Endowments Department of the Government of Tamil Nadu.

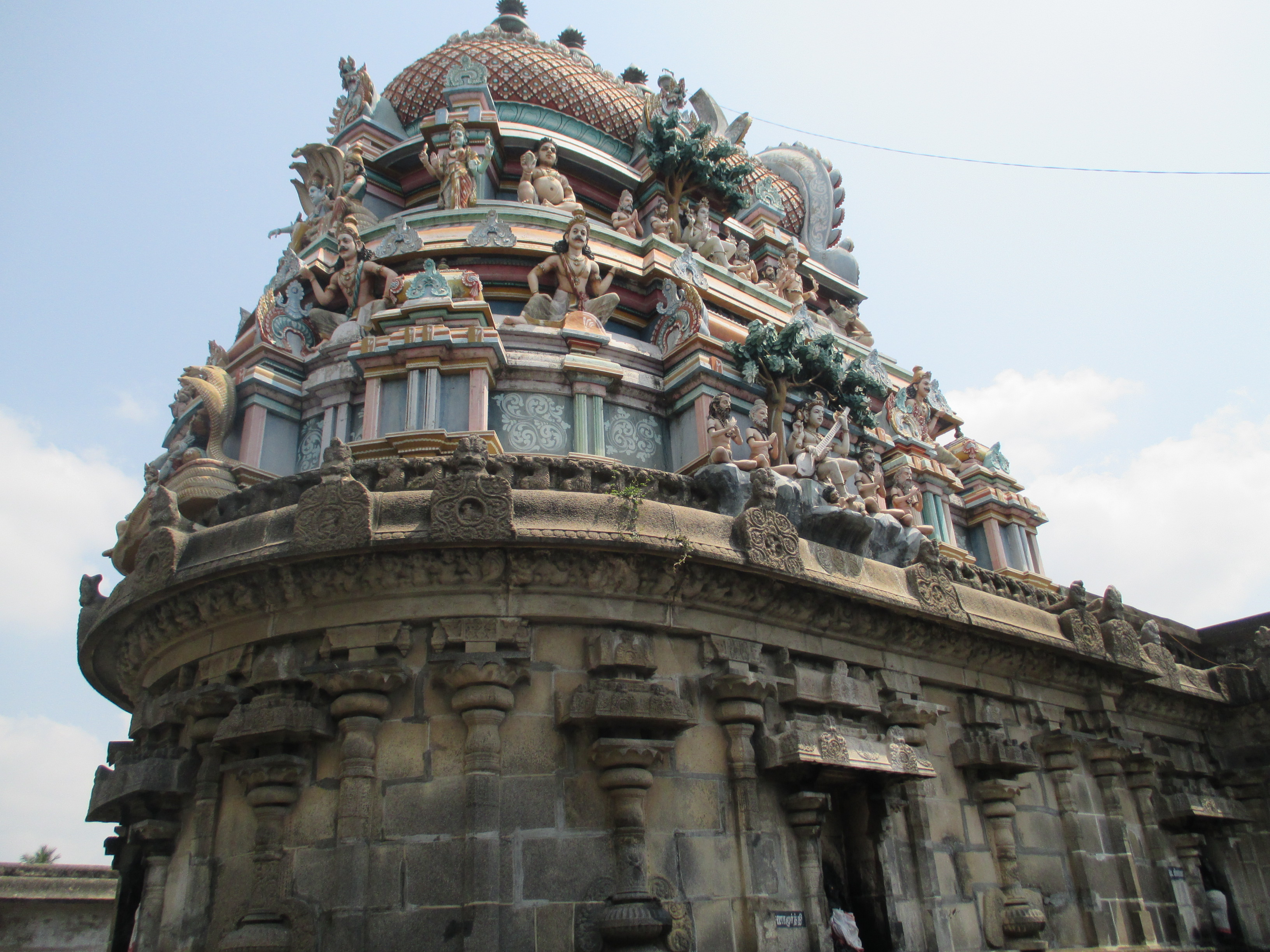
The Gajabristha Vimana, in the shape of a hip of an elephant

The temple is in Magaral, a village in Kanchipuram district, located 12 km from Uthiramerur on the Uthiramerur - Kanchipuram highway. The temple is located on the northern banks of Cheyyar River.

== History and religious importance ==
It is one of the shrines of the 275 Paadal Petra Sthalams - Shiva Sthalams glorified in the early medieval Tevaram poems by Tamil Saivite Nayanmars Thirugnana Sambanthar. As the temple is revered in Tevaram, it is classified as Paadal Petra Sthalam, one of the 276 temples that find mention in the Saiva canon. As per Periya Puranam, the hagiography depicting the life of the 63 Nayanmars, Sambandar visited the place before moving on Kuranganilmuttam and Kanchipuram.
