= Mukkur N. Subramanian =

Indian politician

Member of the Tamil Nadu Legislative Assembly
- Incumbent
- Assumed office 11 May 2026
- Preceded by: O. Jothi
- Constituency: Cheyyar
- In office 16 May 2011 – 19 May 2016
- Preceded by: M. K. Vishnu Prasad
- Succeeded by: K. Mohan
- Constituency: Cheyyar

Personal details
- Party: All India Anna Dravida Munnetra Kazhagam

Mukkur N. Subramanian is an Indian politician and was a member of the 14th Tamil Nadu Legislative Assembly from Cheyyar constituency. He represented the All India Anna Dravida Munnetra Kazhagam (AIADMK) party. He was Minister for Information Technology in the Government of Tamil Nadu.

Subramanian did not obtain support from the AIADMK to stand in the 2016 elections.
