= V.T. Subramania Pillai =

V.T. Subramania Pillai aka V.T.S. (11 December 1846 – 17 April 1909) was a scholar of Tamil music in India. He published books containing more than 1,100 songs of Thirupugal (Tiruppukal or Tiruppugal).

== Early life ==
V.T. Subramania Pillai was born in a family of devoted servants of Lord Murugan, in Chingleput on 11 December 1846, to Sri Tanikachalam and Smt Lakkumi Ammal, of Rishi Karuneegar sect and Gautama gotra. It was a Friday and the star was Uttira. His grandfather Karpagam Pillai was an ardent devotee of Lord Murukan at Tiruttani, and it is said that Lord Murukan had guided him through dreams on several occasions.

He started his education in 1857 in Chingleput Mission School. Lack of funds for further studies saw him as teacher in the same school on a salary of Rs.8/- in 1863. On the advice of Mr. Miller, a professor in Chennai (who remained a well wisher of V.T.S. throughout his life), V.T.S. continued his studies in Chennai after topping the Mackintosh Scholarship examination. He completed F.A. and became a teacher in Mr. Miller's school, on a salary of Rs.40/-.

== Later life ==
Due to health problems, V.T.S. wished to move out of Chennai. Moreover, teaching was not his choice. Whenever he visited his parents in Chenglepet, he had to walk the entire distance of 35 miles (56 km), because there was no rail train in those days, and his poverty did not allow him to hire a vehicle.

At that time, Judge Hudson of Manjakuppam (Cuddalore), impressed by the hand-writing of V.T.S., offered him the second English Writer's post in his court in 1870. Thereupon he passed all the examinations to qualify for the post of a district munsif. After a long wait of eight years, he was appointed munsif of Cuddalore. Subsequently he moved to different places such as Tiruvallur, Namakkal (1888), Kumbakonam (1892), Tirutarupoondi (1894), Madurai (1897) and Manamadurai (1899) and retired in the year 1901.

== Life style and personal traits ==
V.T. Subramania Pillai was from his early days very devoted to Tamil and the Tamil God Murukan. Wherever his job took him, he made it a point to visit as many temples nearby as possible. He had visited 176 out of the 274 pātal perrat talankal, which are holy places whose glory has been sung by the great saints Tirujñānasampantar, Tirunāvukkarasu and Sundarar, as early as the 7th century. His wish however was to spend his last days in Kanchipuram worshipping Sri Ekāmbanātha.

He, like his ancestors, had a special devotion to the Lord of Tiruttani. Right from the days of his grandfather, it was a custom that on Krttikā (star) days only, could the Tiruttani temple be visited, if at all. This is in practice to this day. This is possibly to indicate the strength of unidirectional concentration.

He spoke softly pleasant words in chaste Tamil language. As a munsif, his judgements were applauded by several higher authorities. He was respected by one and all for his tolerance and integrity. He put into practice the kural:

"Olukkam viluppam taralān uyirinum ōmpappatum" ("Since a principle's life-style bestows greatness, it should be cherished more than one's life").

He was regular in his diary-keeping, which he started on 15 September 1864, at the age of 17. He maintained an account book, visited specific temples on specifics days, with daily prayers which included Śivapuranam, Śiva kavacam, Kandaranubhuti, Saiva patikam. He wrote Tanikaiyyān tunai 32 times and composed a verse on Tanikēsan daily. Thus a firm faith in the Lord, and the habit of thanking him all the time, seem to be characteristic of V.T.S., as seen from his diary.

As his condition improved from dire poverty to one of comfort, he increased his services to temples, such as making arrangements for lighting of oil lamps on regular basis, donating utensils, bells, etc., for temple use, renovating temples, and helping installation of deities so far unattended. Further, he helped complete the construction of the Rishi Karunīkar mutt in Tiruttani in 1902. In 1905 he took the initiative to re-establish Palamutircōlai, one of the six places of importance to Lord Murukan. He was married to Dayammal on 25 June 1868, who shared his devotion to Lord Murukan and remained a perfect companion to V.T.S. in his spiritual journey.

In short, the life of V.T.S. can be described by the three D's: Discipline, Devotion and Dharman. He attained the Lord's feet on 17 April 1909, dying at the age of 62, after seeing his life's mission successfully completed by the Lord's grace.

== The Mission ==
In 1871, when V.T.S. was working in the district court at Manjakuppam, dikshitars (priests) of Chidambaram temple, by way of evidence in a court case presented quotations from several literary works. One such quotation included lines from the Tiruppugal (625).

"Tātu māmalar mutiyālē ...
Vēta nūnmurai valuvāmē tinam
Vēlvi yālelil punai mūvāyira
mēnmai vētiyar mikavē pūcanai purikōvē.

['O Lord! very well worshipped by the brahmins known for their greatness as mūvāyiravar (the three thousand) who excel in performing sacrifices and worship daily in strict adherence to the rules laid down in the Vedas.']

The beauty inherent in these lines fascinated V.T.S. so much that he made it his life's mission to collect and publish at least one thousand of the 16,000 songs believed to have been composed by Arunagirinathar. In this effort, V.T.S. felt that the world should get the same joy that he derived. Tānperra inpam peruka ivvaiyakam. Being an ardent devotee of Lord Murukan, he rightly thought that the Tiruppukal songs were the prime pieces of adoration of Lord Murukan just as Tēvāram and Tiruvācakam were considered as best suited for prayers to Lord Śiva.

== Sources of songs ==
In January 1876, he found six songs of Tiruppukal in the second volume of Arumuka Navalar's Caiva Vinā vitai. In April, on a Good Friday morning, he started copying the songs from palm leaves which had been collected. On June 28, 1878, he obtained 750 songs on palm leaves from Annamalai Pillai of Kanchipuram, and on September 30, a further 400 songs from Sreenivasa Pillai of Pinnatur near Chidambaram. On 20 March 1881, Arumuga Iyer of Karunkuli gave him 900 more songs. In 1903 palm leaves containing 780 songs were found from Tirumakaral, which had just one new song.

It was a difficult task to wade through and organize his collection because of repetitions of songs, and variations in the text. In his effort to rectify the errors to the extent possible, the 3 Tamil scholars Śiva Chidambara Mudaliar of Cuddalore, Salem Saravana Pillai, and Anantarama Iyer were of immense help. In spite of all this, V.T.S. in the introduction to the first print requested the public to bear with any errors in the text, hoping to get the text perfected in subsequent editions. This indicates his sole desire to bring out the perfect poetic form of Tiruppukal. He also thanked profusely all those who contributed in the great task of collecting the Tiruppukal hymns.

== Organization of songs ==
The songs pertaining to the six places Ārupataivītu were placed first followed by Pañcabhūta sthalas. The remaining songs were grouped under Tontai Natu, Cola Natu, etc. Songs not pertaining to any particular place were arranged towards the end.

== Publication ==
In 1895 the publication of the first volume of Tiruppukal was released, with 603 songs. The second edition was brought out in 1909 after a fair amount of rechecking and revising. The third edition in June 1921 was the effort of his sons V.S. Shanmugham and V.S. Chengalvaran, in which some new songs were added. The fourth edition, of June 1931, included the literary work Tiruppukal Cirappu Pāyiram.

=== Second volume ===
The second volume was printed in 1902. It contained songs of Pañcabhūta sthalas and 158 songs of places from Kasi to Rameswaram. The second edition was brought out in 1923 by his sons V.S.S. and V.S.C. Thirty-two new songs were included in this edition.

=== Third volume ===
Although V.T.S. did not live to see the publication of the third volume, he did most of the spade work. In 1926 this volume was published, containing 309 Tiruppukal songs and other works of Saint Arunagirinatha, including Kantar Anupūti, Kantar Alankāram, Kantar Antāti and Tiruvākuppu. This volume included a research write-up on canta (rhythm), a biographical note on Saint Arunagirinatha, hymns of praise of the saint, and analytical research notes on the saint's works. "Tiruvelukūrrirukkai" was excluded by V.T.S., as he suspected possible imperfections. However his sons, impressed by the flow and content of the song, ventured to include it in the third volume.

Incidentally, his son V.S.C, who had inherited the same love for Tiruppukal, made further contributions by presenting Murukan Vēl Panniry Tirumurai along the same lines as Saiva Tirumurais, wherein the meanings and commentaries for all of Arunagirinatha's works are elucidated. This was published in six volumes during 1952-57. The twelfth Tirumurai (corresponding to Periyappurānam) called "Ceytontar Purānam" was composed by Tenur Cokkalingam Pillai.

It was Sri Vallimalai Saccidananda Swamigal (1870–1951) who was chosen to popularize the Tiruppukal songs. Just like V.T.S., Vallimalai Saccidananda Swamigal, attracted by the beauty of a song at Palani, managed to get the first volume published by VJS and started singing these songs. He met V.S.C. at Tiruttani temple in 1912, and this led to a lifelong friendship. Swamigal selected a series of devotional songs for use during the various steps of a routine daily worship. For spreading it on a large scale, the Pati Vilā (step festival) on 1 January of every year, was started in Tiruttani in 1918.

== Other publications ==
V.T. Subramania Pillai's other publications include:

- Brahmōttara Kānda Vacanam (21 January 1879);
- Tirutarupūnti Stalapurānam (1897);
- Tiruvārūr Purānam; Veteranya Purānam (1897);
- Namakkal Cenkalunīr Vināyakar Navaratna Mālai (1898);
- Manamaturai Stalapurānam (1901);
- Tiru uttarakocamankai Mankaleswari Pillai Tamil (1901);
- Cuntara Vilācam (1904);
- Śivasthala Mañjari (1905); and
- Tiruniturttala Purānam (1908).

From 1882, V.T.S. was collecting details about Śiva temples with a view to prepare a directory-like book, Śiva Sthala Agarati. However, his wish was fulfilled after a long interval of 23 years. It was Mahāmahopatiyya Dr. U.V. Swaminatha Iyer who suggested the title "Śivasthala Mañjari".

== Legacy ==
As per his wish, his samādhi was built in direct view of the Tiruttani temple gopuram. His immortality is well established in the hearts of all those who enjoy singing Tiruppukal. The story of V.T.S. has been rendered in poetic form in 121 verses under the title of "Tiruppukal Cuppiramaniya Nāyanar", which occurs in Ceytontar Purānam, composed by Varakavi Tenur Cokkalinkam Pillai. Dr. U.V. Swaminatha Iyer noted:

"Pūvarum amalan, ayilkarac cevvēl ponnati yēninain turkit Tāvarum aruna kiripperun kaviñan cārriya Tiruppukal palavum Mēvaru nilaiyai unarntavan arulē meyttunai yākkotu tēti Yāvarum peraccey cuppiramaniya ēntalcīr iyampurar pārrō!"

["Is it possible to describe the greatness of Cuppiramaniya (V.T.S) who, with the grace of the Lord, searched and made available to all, Tiruppukal songs sung by the great Arunagiri, the poet who melted in devotion with his mind always on the golden feet of Lord Murukan?"]
