= O. Jothi =

Indian politician

Member of the Tamil Nadu Legislative Assembly
- In office 12 May 2021 – 6 May 2026
- Preceded by: Dusi. K. Mohan
- Succeeded by: Mukkur N. Subramanian
- Constituency: Cheyyar

Personal details
- Party: Dravida Munnetra Kazhagam

O. Jothi is an Indian politician who is a Member of Legislative Assembly of Tamil Nadu. He was elected from Cheyyar as a Dravida Munnetra Kazhagam candidate in 2021.

== Elections contested ==
Election	Constituency	Party	Result	Vote %	Runner-up	Runner-up Party	Runner-up vote %
2021 Tamil Nadu Legislative Assembly election	Cheyyar	DMK	Won	51.27%	Dusi. K. Mohan	ADMK	39.81%
