= Arunagirinathar =

Tamil Shaivite saint-poet

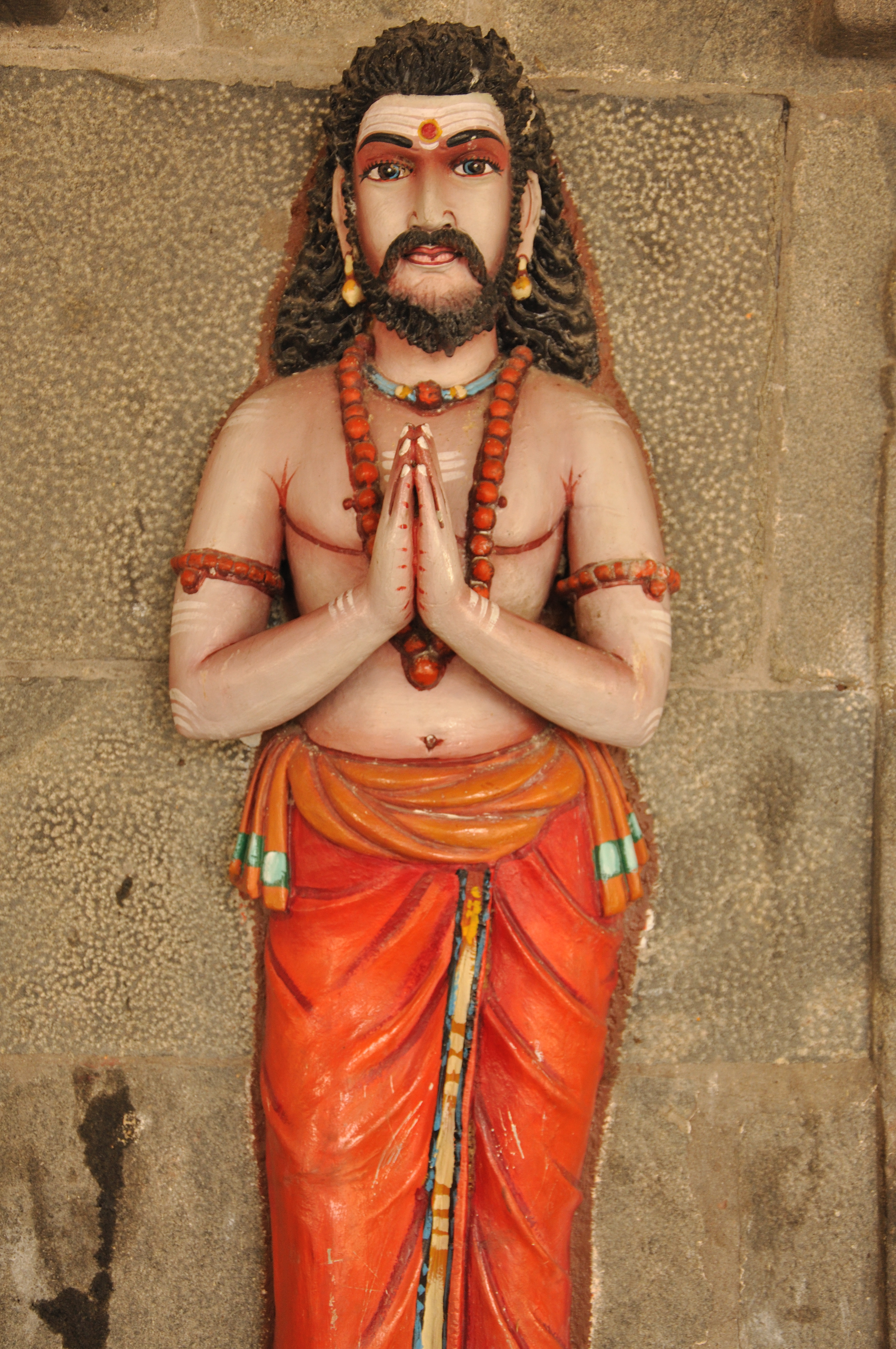
- Arunagirinathar Statue at Venjamakoodalur Temple, near Karur

Personal life
- Born: 1370 CE Tiruvannamalai, Vijayanagara Empire (modern-day Tamil Nadu, India)
- Died: 1450 CE (aged 80) Tiruvannamalai, Vijayanagara Empire (modern-day Tamil Nadu, India)
- Notable work(s): Tiruppugazh Tiruvakuppu; Kandar Alangaram; Kandar Anubhuti; Kandar Antati; Vel Viruttam; Mayil Viruttam Seval Viruttam; Tiruelukūtrirukkai

Religious life
- Religion: Hinduism
- Philosophy: Shaivism

Arunagirinathar (Aruṇakirinātar, Tamil: [aɾuɳaɡɯɾɯn̪aːdar]) was a Tamil Shaiva saint-poet who lived during the 14th century in Tamil Nadu, India. In his treatise A History of Indian Literature (1974), Czech Indologist Kamil Zvelebil places Arunagirinathar's period between circa 1370 CE and circa 1450 CE. He was the creator of Tiruppugazh (Tiruppugazh, [tiɾupːɯɡaɻ], meaning "Holy Praise" or "Divine Glory"), a book of poems in Tamil in praise of Murugan.

His poems are known for their lyricism coupled with complex rhymes and rhythmic structures. In the Tiruppugazh, the literature and devotion are blended harmoniously.

Tiruppugazh is one of the major works of medieval Tamil literature, known for its poetical and musical qualities, as well as for its religious, moral and philosophical content.

== Early life ==
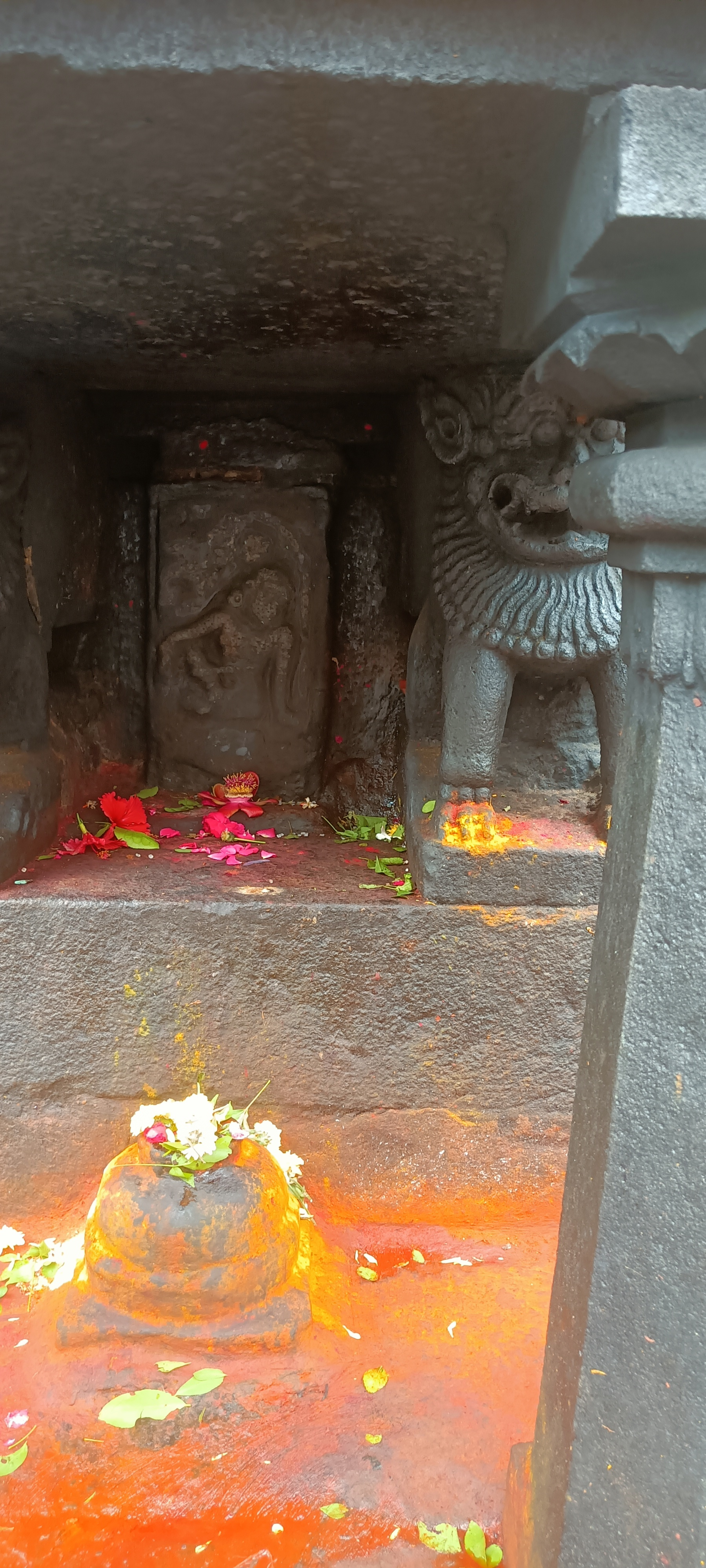
Arunagirinathar's mausoleum in a temple

Arunagirinathar was born as Senguntha Kaikolar family during the 14th century in Tiruvannamalai, a town in the Vijayanagara empire. His father died soon after his birth, and his pious mother and sister instilled in him their cultural and religious traditions. Legends claim that Arunagirinathar was attracted to sexual pleasures and spent his youth pursuing a life of debauchery. His sister always gave whatever she earned to make her brother happy, and he frequently visited brothels. It was said that since he was enjoying his life in dissipation, he started to suffer from leprosy and because of it, people started to avoid him.

There came a time when his sister had no money to meet his demands for gambling. Arunagirinathar said he was going to kill himself because of this. To prevent Arunagirinathar from committing suicide, his sister said that he should sell her to have money, upon hearing which Arunagirinathar realised how ill-minded he had been. He decided to end his life, went to a temple and hit his head against the pillars and steps, begging for forgiveness. He considered jumping to his death from the temple tower. However, according to legends, the deity Murugan himself prevented him from committing suicide, cured his leprosy, forgave his acts, showed him a path of reform and piety and initiated him to create devotional songs for the benefit of mankind.

=== Alternative autobiographical version ===
The above story, though popular, contradicts the poet's own version of his story. In the Tiruppugazh, Manaiaval nahaikka, Arunagirinathar speaks of how his wife, parents and relatives were utterly disgusted with him, and ridicule from friends and others in town impelled him to try to end his life. He thanks the deity for saving him at this time. This not only suggests that his father was alive much longer than the myths indicate, but also that he was married.

Arunagirinathar sang his first devotional song thereafter and decided to spend the rest of his life in piety, writing devotional poetry and singing in the praise of God. He was a devotee of Murugan and worshipped him at the sacred Vedapureeswarar temple in the town of Cheyyar.

His fame drew the jealousy of the chief minister of the Kingdom. He accused Arunagirinathar of espousing false beliefs. The king arranged a public gathering of thousands and commanded Arunagirinathar to prove the existence of Murugan to others. According to Tamil Hindu tradition, it is recorded that Arunagirinathar began performing his devotional songs for Murugan, and soon after, the form of Murugan miraculously appeared before those gathered, thus saving his life.

== Songs ==
Arunagirinathar rendered his first song 'Mutthai tharu' after the miraculous rescue from suicide, at Tiruvannamalai. Arunagirinathar visited temples all over South India and composed 16,000 songs - at present about 1,334 alone were found. His songs show the way to a life of virtue and righteousness and set the tone for a new form of worship, the musical worship.

The works of Arunagirinathar include:

- Tiruppugazh
- Tiruvaguppu
- Kandar Alangaram
- Kandar Anubhuti
- Kandar Andadhi
- Vel Viruttam
- Mayil Viruttam
- Seval Viruttam
- Tiruelukūtrirukkai

For Murugan's devotees Tiruppugazh is equivalent to Tevaram, Kandar Alangaram is equivalent to Thiruvasagam and Kandar Anubhuti is equivalent to the Thirumanthiram. In the Kandar Anubhuti, it is revealed that Arunagirinathar was an exponent of Shaktism. He believed that Devi had incarnated on the pusam nakshatra day for the benefit of mankind, in many places, extolling the sanctity of these places, 'She' had a green coloured complexion, and 'She' was the personification of the Vedas. In Tiruppugazh, he describes the divine miracles of Devi. He has shown familiarity with rituals pertaining to vamachara, though one who worships the Devi internally (spiritually) may not worship her externally (physically). It was seen that the title nātha, was normally conferred on a person, when he becomes an adept in the worship of Devi.

== Retrieval ==
The Tiruppugazh songs remained in manuscript form for a number of years and were gradually forgotten. V.T. Subramania Pillai and his son V. S. Chengalvaraya Pillai of Thirutthani understood their value, retrieved and published them.

In 1871 when V. T. Subramania Pillai was working in the district court at Manjakuppam, dikshitars (priests) of Chidambaram temple, by way of evidence in a court case presented quotations from several literary works. One such quotation included lines from the Tiruppugazh (625).

"Tātu māmalar mutiyālē ... Vēta nūnmurai valuvāmē tinam Vēlvi yālelil punai mūvāyira mēnmai vētiyar mikavē pūcanai purikōvē.

['O Lord! very well worshipped by the brahmins known for their greatness as mūvāyiravar (the three thousand) who excel in performing sacrifices and worship daily in strict adherence to the rules laid down in the Vedas.']

The beauty inherent in these lines fascinated V.T.Subramania Pillai, so much that he made it his life's mission to collect and publish at least one thousand of the 16,000 songs believed to have been composed by Arunagirinathar. He toured all over South India, collected manuscripts, including palm leaves, assembled the texts and published them in two volumes, the first in 1894 and the second in 1901. After his demise, his son Chengalvaraya Pillai brought out a new edition of the book of songs.

He also went to so many shrines such as Shiva temple and Murugan temples, Melakadambur is one of them. He wrote a song about this shrine's Muruga "kaviri seerumon seeraru soozh kadambooril" - means Muruga is blessing us from the place where the tributary of the river Cauvery is the Vadavaaru. The place Kadambur lies in the banks of the river Vadavaaru.

== Music of Tiruppugazh ==
There is no doubt that Arunagirinathar possessed a deep knowledge of music and rhythms. His compositions contain references to various ragas (known as panns in Tamil) such as Varali, Lalita, Bhairavi, Malahari, Bowli, Gowla, Kuranji etc. Though he has himself not employed them, he mentioned the fundamental five Marga talas - Shashatputam, ShashapuTam, Shatpitaputrikam, Sampatveshtakam and Udghattam as well as three others - Utsava, Darpana and Charchari talas. His compositions are set in complex meters and form an alternate system of talas called Chanda (meter-based) talas.

The original music of Arunagirinathar has unfortunately not survived which has necessitated them to be re-tuned in recent times. Early musicians who set Tiruppugazh to music included Carnatic musical giant, Kancheepuram Naina Pillai (1888–1934) and his disciple, Chittoor Subramaniam Pillai (1898–1975). Several musicians including G N Balasubramaniam, Alathur Brothers and M M Dandapani Deshikar used to render many of these prominently in their concerts and soon there was not a single musician who had not learnt at least a few of these.

A great number of these were also set to music by noted Tiruppugazh exponent A. S. Raghavan which enabled these masterful creations to gain mass popularity. He set to tune more than 500 of these songs in over 100 Ragas and several of these are being rendered by his large following of Tiruppugazh devotees ("Tiruppugazh Anbargal"). Thanks to him, Tiruppugazh classes sprung up both in cities and rural areas, and Tiruppugazh Anbargal started performing in various forums including Temples, Music Sabhas and homes of devotees where they attracted large audiences. Some of these students who settled in countries outside India started Tiruppugazh classes in their new communities, thus extending the reach of his movement to other continents, and giving the movement an international footing. Other musicians who have set music to Tiruppugazh include Chitravina N. Ravikiran.

== Film ==
He is portrayed by popular playback singer T. M. Soundararajan in a 1964 biopic film.

== See also ==
- Kandar Anubhuti

== Notes ==
- "6. ^Thiruppugazh: musical way of worship". Githa Krishnan. Archived from the original on 6 December 2008.
- "7. ^Temples travelled In the footsteps of Arunagirinathar". V.S. Krishnan. 12 April 2018. Archived from the original on 9 April 2023.
- "8. ^Thiruppugazh - Songs in Tamil (and English) with meanings of Sri V.T. Subramaniam Pillai and V.T. Sengalvaraya pillai of Tiruthani". Free App by Srinivasan Janakiraman.
