= Patcheeswarar Temple =

Patcheeswarar temple is a temple located in Cheyyar, Tiruvannamalai District, Tamil Nadu, India built during the times of Pallava dynasty. It is a temple of Lord Shiva, built in Dravidian architecture.

== History ==
It is said that this temple was built in Pallava dynasty during 7th century CE. It is one of the oldest temple located in Cheyyar Town.

== Legends ==
According to local legends, Garuda worshipped Lord Shiva here. Therefore, Lord Shiva came to be called as Patcheeswarar.

== Temple ==
This temple faces east and features a five-tiered Rajagopuram. In the Mukha Mandapam, facing the sanctum, one can find the Balipeedam, Dhwaja Sthambam, and Nandi. The Sanctum Sanctorum comprises the sanctum, Antrala, Maha Mandapam, and Mukha Mandapam. The Mukha Mandapam serves as a link between the Rajagopuram and the Maha Mandapam. The presiding deity, known as Patcheeswarar, faces east and resides in the sanctum in the form of a Lingam. The Chandikeswarar shrine is located in its usual position. In the Maha Mandapam, there is a south-facing Nataraja Sabha, which houses bronze sculptures of Nataraja along with his consort Shivagami and Sekkizhar. The goddess, known as Parvathi, is enshrined in a separate south-facing shrine. The temple premises also feature shrines dedicated to Vinayaga, Murugan with his consorts Valli and Devasena, Garuda, Gajalakshmi, and the Nalvar.

== See also ==
- Cheyyar
