= Cheyyar Assembly constituency =

State Legislative Assembly Constituency in Tamil Nadu

Coordinates: 12.6580°N 79.5424°E

Cheyyar
- Constituency No. 68 for the Tamil Nadu Legislative Assembly

Constituency details
- Country: India
- Region: South India
- State: Tamil Nadu
- District: Tiruvannamalai
- Lok Sabha constituency: Arani
- Established: 1951
- Total electors: 2,40,008

Member of Legislative Assembly
- 17th Tamil Nadu Legislative Assembly
- Incumbent Mukkur N. Subramanian
- Party: AIADMK
- Alliance: NDA
- Elected year: 2026

Cheyyaru or 'Cheyyar' is a state assembly constituency in Tiruvannamalai district of Tamil Nadu, India. Its State Assembly Constituency number is 68. It comprises a portion of Cheyyar taluk and Vembakkam taluk and is a part of Arani Lok Sabha constituency for national elections to the Parliament of India. It is one of the 234 State Legislative Assembly Constituencies in Tamil Nadu, in India.

== Members of the Legislative Assembly ==
Election	Member	Party
1952	V. Darmalinga Nayagar	Commonweal Party
1957	P. Ramachandran	Indian National Congress
1962	Pulavar K. Govindan	Dravida Munnetra Kazhagam
1967	Pulavar K. Govindan	Dravida Munnetra Kazhagam
1971	Pulavar K. Govindan	Dravida Munnetra Kazhagam
1977	Pulavar K. Govindan	Dravida Munnetra Kazhagam
1980	Babu Janarthanan	Dravida Munnetra Kazhagam
1984	K. Murugan	All India Anna Dravida Munnetra Kazhagam
1989	V. Anbalagan	Dravida Munnetra Kazhagam
1991	A. Devaraj	All India Anna Dravida Munnetra Kazhagam
1996	V. Anbalagan	Dravida Munnetra Kazhagam
2001	P. S. Ulagarakshagan	Pattali Makkal Katchi
2006	M. K. Vishnu Prasad	Indian National Congress
2011	Mukkur N. Subramanian	All India Anna Dravida Munnetra Kazhagam
2016	K. Mohan	All India Anna Dravida Munnetra Kazhagam
2021	O. Jothi	Dravida Munnetra Kazhagam
2026	Mukkur N. Subramanian	All India Anna Dravida Munnetra Kazhagam

Madras State

== Election results ==
Vote share of winning candidates
2026	38.95%
2021	47.78%
2016	37.78%
2011	53.67%
2006	44.36%
2001	50.90%
1996	61.24%
1991	60.59%
1989	46.75%
1984	58.46%
1980	55.26%
1977	43.34%
1971	55.79%
1967	54.86%
1962	41.99%
1957	51.24%
1952	56.49%

=== Assembly election 2026 ===
2026 Tamil Nadu Legislative Assembly election : Cheyyar
Party	Candidate	Votes	%	±%
AIADMK	Mukkur N. Subramanian	86,680	38.95%	New
TVK	Dusi K. Mohan	65,599	29.47%	New
DMK	O. Jothi	59,894	26.91%	▼21.29
NTK	M. Tamilselvan	7,043	3.16%	▼2.58
NOTA	None of the above	950	0.43%	▼0.46
Margin of victory		21,081	9.47%	▲3.70
Turnout		222,933	92.89%	▲10.30
Total valid votes		222,570		
Registered electors		240,008		▼7.65
AIADMK gain from DMK		Swing	▼9.25	

=== Assembly election 2021 ===
2021 Tamil Nadu Legislative Assembly election : Cheyyar
Party	Candidate	Votes	%	±%
DMK	O. Jothi	102,460	48.20%	New
AIADMK	Dusi K. Mohan	90,189	42.43%	▲4.65
NTK	G. Bheeman	12,192	5.74%	▲5.27
MNM	T. Mayilvaganan	2,429	1.14%	New
NOTA	None of the above	1,895	0.89%	▼0.20
AMMK	M. K. Varadharajan	1,760	0.83%	New
Margin of victory		12,271	5.77%	▲1.63
Turnout		214,645	82.59%	▼2.08
Total valid votes		212,565		
Rejected ballots		185	0.09%	▲0.08
Registered electors		259,890		▲6.91
DMK gain from AIADMK		Swing	▲10.42	

=== Assembly election 2016 ===
2016 Tamil Nadu Legislative Assembly election : Cheyyar
Party	Candidate	Votes	%	±%
AIADMK	K. Mohan	77,766	37.78%	▼15.89
INC	M. K. Vishnu Prasad	69,239	33.64%	▼5.82
PMK	G. Srinivasan	37,491	18.22%	New
DMDK	P. Sarvanan	10,855	5.27%	New
BJP	B. Bhaskaran	2,388	1.16%	▼0.06
NOTA	None of the above	2,248	1.09%	New
Independent	K. Mohan	1,300	0.63%	
Margin of victory		8,527	4.14%	▼10.07
Turnout		205,824	84.67%	▼0.33
Total valid votes		205,813		
Rejected ballots		11	0.01%	▼0.11
Registered electors		243,084		▲15.15
AIADMK hold		Swing		

=== Assembly election 2011 ===
2011 Tamil Nadu Legislative Assembly election : Cheyyar
Party	Candidate	Votes	%	±%
AIADMK	Mukkur N. Subramanian	96,180	53.67%	▲12.85
INC	M. K. Vishnu Prasad	70,717	39.46%	▼4.90
Independent	D. Viswanathan	3,022	1.69%	
Independent	E. Rajendiran	2,208	1.23%	
BJP	D. Tamilarasi	2,179	1.22%	▲0.11
Puratchi Bharatham	K. P. Elangovan	1,759	0.98%	New
Margin of victory		25,463	14.21%	▲10.68
Turnout		179,443	85.00%	▲5.05
Total valid votes		179,221		
Rejected ballots		222	0.12%	▲0.12
Registered electors		211,108		▲24.55
AIADMK gain from INC		Swing	▲9.31	

=== Assembly election 2006 ===
2006 Tamil Nadu Legislative Assembly election : Cheyyar
Party	Candidate	Votes	%	±%
INC	M. K. Vishnu Prasad	60,109	44.36%	New
AIADMK	R. Pavai	55,319	40.82%	New
DMDK	D. Subamangalam	13,655	10.08%	New
Independent	V. Ravichandran	2,363	1.74%	
BJP	G. Lakshmanan	1,502	1.11%	New
Margin of victory		4,790	3.53%	▼6.29
Turnout		135,513	79.95%	▲8.13
Total valid votes		135,508		
Registered electors		169,494		▼1.05
INC gain from PMK		Swing	▼6.54	

=== Assembly election 2001 ===
2001 Tamil Nadu Legislative Assembly election : Cheyyar
Party	Candidate	Votes	%	±%
PMK	P. S. Ulagarakshagan	62,615	50.90%	New
DMK	R. K. P. Rajarajan	50,530	41.07%	▼20.17
MDMK	B. Yamuna	3,027	2.46%	▼0.88
Independent	V. Venkatesan	2,925	2.38%	
Independent	T. Thamizhiniyan	1,642	1.33%	
Independent	K. Palani	1,589	1.29%	
Margin of victory		12,085	9.82%	▼22.32
Turnout		123,026	71.82%	▼4.59
Total valid votes		123,026		
Registered electors		171,299		▲6.26
PMK gain from DMK		Swing	▼10.34	

=== Assembly election 1996 ===
1996 Tamil Nadu Legislative Assembly election : Cheyyar
Party	Candidate	Votes	%	±%
DMK	V. Anbalagan	71,416	61.24%	▲33.63
AIADMK	P. Chandran	33,930	29.09%	New
Independent	S. Sundararajan	4,858	4.17%	
MDMK	R. Ramalingam	3,896	3.34%	New
Margin of victory		37,486	32.14%	▼0.84
Turnout		123,174	76.41%	▲4.05
Total valid votes		116,620		
Rejected ballots		6,623	5.38%	▲1.23
Registered electors		161,200		▲2.56
DMK gain from AIADMK		Swing	▲0.65	

=== Assembly election 1991 ===
1991 Tamil Nadu Legislative Assembly election : Cheyyar
Party	Candidate	Votes	%	±%
AIADMK	A. Devaraj	66,061	60.59%	New
DMK	V. Anbalagan	30,106	27.61%	▼19.14
PMK	G. Ulaganathan	12,149	11.14%	New
Margin of victory		35,955	32.98%	▲9.41
Turnout		113,737	72.36%	▼0.24
Total valid votes		109,021		
Rejected ballots		4,716	4.15%	▲1.74
Registered electors		157,173		▲12.27
AIADMK gain from DMK		Swing	▲13.84	

=== Assembly election 1989 ===
1989 Tamil Nadu Legislative Assembly election : Cheyyar
Party	Candidate	Votes	%	±%
DMK	V. Anbalagan	46,376	46.75%	▲6.22
INC	M. Krisnhaswamy	22,993	23.18%	New
AIADMK	P. Chandran	21,998	22.18%	New
AIADMK	P. Balakrishnan	5,012	5.05%	New
Margin of victory		23,383	23.57%	▲5.65
Turnout		101,639	72.60%	▼7.46
Total valid votes		99,190		
Rejected ballots		2,449	2.41%	▼2.94
Registered electors		139,998		▲14.96
DMK gain from AIADMK		Swing	▼11.71	

=== Assembly election 1984 ===
1984 Tamil Nadu Legislative Assembly election : Cheyyar
Party	Candidate	Votes	%	±%
AIADMK	K. Murugan	53,945	58.46%	▲13.72
DMK	Babu Janarthanan	37,405	40.53%	▼14.73
Margin of victory		16,540	17.92%	▲7.40
Turnout		97,497	80.06%	▲10.41
Total valid votes		92,282		
Rejected ballots		5,215	5.35%	▲3.54
Registered electors		121,783		▲6.19
AIADMK gain from DMK		Swing	▲3.20	

=== Assembly election 1980 ===
1980 Tamil Nadu Legislative Assembly election : Cheyyar
Party	Candidate	Votes	%	±%
DMK	Babu Janarthanan	43,341	55.26%	▲11.92
AIADMK	K. A. Vizhi Vendan	35,091	44.74%	New
Margin of victory		8,250	10.52%	▼4.97
Turnout		79,877	69.65%	▼1.96
Total valid votes		78,432		
Rejected ballots		1,445	1.81%	▲0.25
Registered electors		114,683		▲5.09
DMK hold		Swing		

=== Assembly election 1977 ===
1977 Tamil Nadu Legislative Assembly election : Cheyyar
Party	Candidate	Votes	%	±%
DMK	Pulavar K. Govindan	33,338	43.34%	▼12.45
AIADMK	K. Shanmugha Sundaram	21,419	27.84%	New
JP	M. Boopalan	14,271	18.55%	New
INC	M. Krishnaswamv	5,992	7.79%	New
Independent	C. M. Perumalsami	1,174	1.53%	
Independent	Narayanan	502	0.65%	
Margin of victory		11,919	15.49%	▲3.91
Turnout		78,148	71.61%	▼11.59
Total valid votes		76,930		
Rejected ballots		1,218	1.56%	▲1.56
Registered electors		109,131		▲23.76
DMK hold		Swing		

=== Assembly election 1971 ===
1971 Tamil Nadu Legislative Assembly election : Cheyyar
Party	Candidate	Votes	%	±%
DMK	Pulavar K. Govindan	39,978	55.79%	▲0.93
INC	Perumalsamy Nayagar	31,677	44.21%	New
Margin of victory		8,301	11.58%	▼17.53
Turnout		73,369	83.20%	▼0.29
Total valid votes		71,655		
Registered electors		88,183		▲3.34
DMK hold		Swing		

=== Assembly election 1967 ===
1967 Madras State Legislative Assembly election : Cheyyar
Party	Candidate	Votes	%	±%
DMK	Pulavar K. Govindan	37,068	54.86%	▲12.87
INC	K. M. Kangan	17,395	25.74%	▼15.61
Independent	P. Naicker	11,095	16.42%	
Independent	P. K. Chandran	2,012	2.98%	
Margin of victory		19,673	29.11%	▲28.46
Turnout		71,251	83.49%	▲10.42
Total valid votes		67,570		
Registered electors		85,337		▲7.28
DMK hold		Swing		

=== Assembly election 1962 ===
1962 Madras State Legislative Assembly election : Cheyyar
Party	Candidate	Votes	%	±%
DMK	Pulavar K. Govindan	23,250	41.99%	New
INC	V. Darmalinga Nayagar	22,892	41.35%	▼9.89
SWA	Perumalswami Naicker	9,225	16.66%	New
Margin of victory		358	0.65%	▼1.83
Turnout		58,124	73.07%	▲4.80
Total valid votes		55,367		
Registered electors		79,544		▲6.94
DMK gain from INC		Swing	▼9.25	

=== Assembly election 1957 ===
1957 Madras State Legislative Assembly election : Cheyyar
Party	Candidate	Votes	%	±%
INC	P. Ramachandran	26,018	51.24%	▲7.73
Independent	V. Darmalinga Nayagar	24,761	48.76%	
Margin of victory		1,257	2.48%	▼10.49
Turnout		50,779	68.27%	▲5.38
Total valid votes		50,779		
Registered electors		74,385		▲3.28
INC gain from Commonweal Party		Swing	▼5.25	

=== Assembly election 1952 ===
1952 Madras State Legislative Assembly election : Cheyyar
Party	Candidate	Votes	%	±%
Commonweal Party	V. Darmalinga Nayagar	25,586	56.49%	New
INC	P. Ramachandran	19,709	43.51%	New
Margin of victory		5,877	12.97%	
Turnout		45,295	62.89%	
Total valid votes		45,295		
Registered electors		72,023		
Commonweal Party win (new seat)				
