= Kandar Anubhuti =

Tamil Hindu work of literature

Kandar Anubhuti (Tamil: கந்தர் அநுபூதி) is a work of Tamil Hindu literature composed by the poet-saint Arunagirinathar. The collection of songs are dated to around 1500 CE. It consists of 51 hymns dedicated to the Hindu deity Murugan, asking him to grant wisdom in order to overcome maya, the 'illusory nature of the world'.

== Description ==
Translated as "The perception of Skanda", the Kandar Anubhuti describes the themes of the detachment from the world, a spiritual experience of the deity Murugan, and observation of the deity both with and without form.
