= Cheyyar River =

River in Tamil Nadu, India

Coordinates: 12°46′N 79°51′E

Location
- Location: Tamil Nadu, South India

Physical characteristics
- Source
  - location: Javvadhu hills, cheyyar, Tiruvannamalai district.
- Mouth
  - location: Palar River

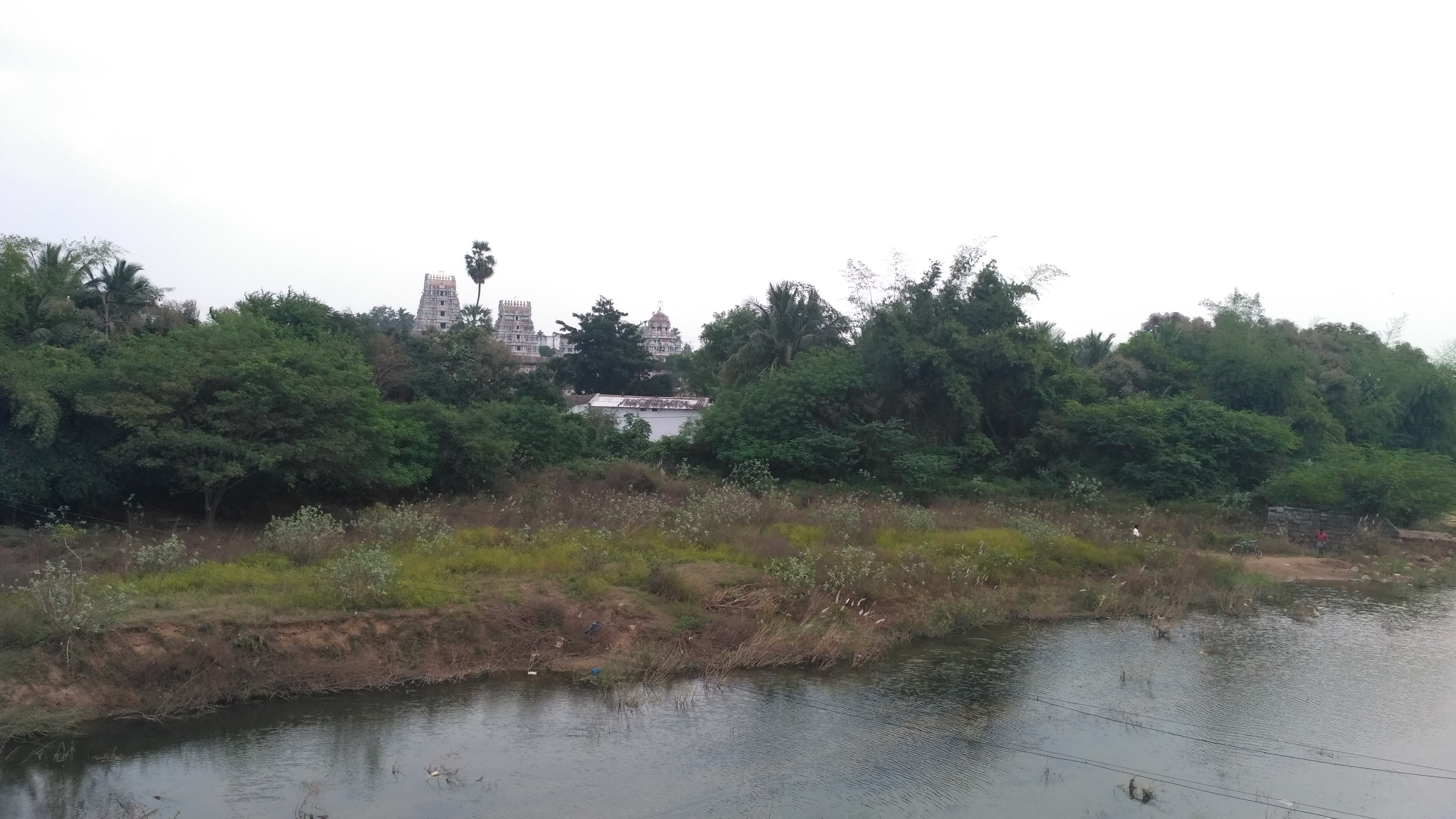
Cheyyar river

Cheyyaru River is an important seasonal river that runs through the Tiruvannamalai District of the state of Tamil Nadu in South India. It is a tributary of Palar River, a river which originates in Jawadhu Hills and flows through Thiruvannamalai district before entering into the Bay of Bengal. The river receives most of its water from the Northeast and Southwest monsoons and is the major source of irrigation for several villages, including the towns of Cheyyaru and Vandavasi along its bank.

== Temples ==
An ancient temple, the Vedapureeswarar Temple anciently known as Vedhanadeshwarar temple situated on the bank of the river at Cheyyar town. There is a legend that Thirugnana Sambandar, one of the four great saivite saints, visited the temple and changed a male palm tree to a female palm tree which can yield palm fruit by singing verses in Tamil. The ancient name for Cheyyaru river is Sei Aaru (Child river) meaning that the river is created for a child to play. Legend says that Goddess Parvathi (Balakusalambigai or Ilamulainayagi) made a line on the earth's surface with her Trisul to make a river for her son, Lord Muruga to play. The river is still believed to be a Holy River even today in Cheyyar and Villages in the surrounding.
