= Cheyyar =

- Town
- Tiruvetipuram
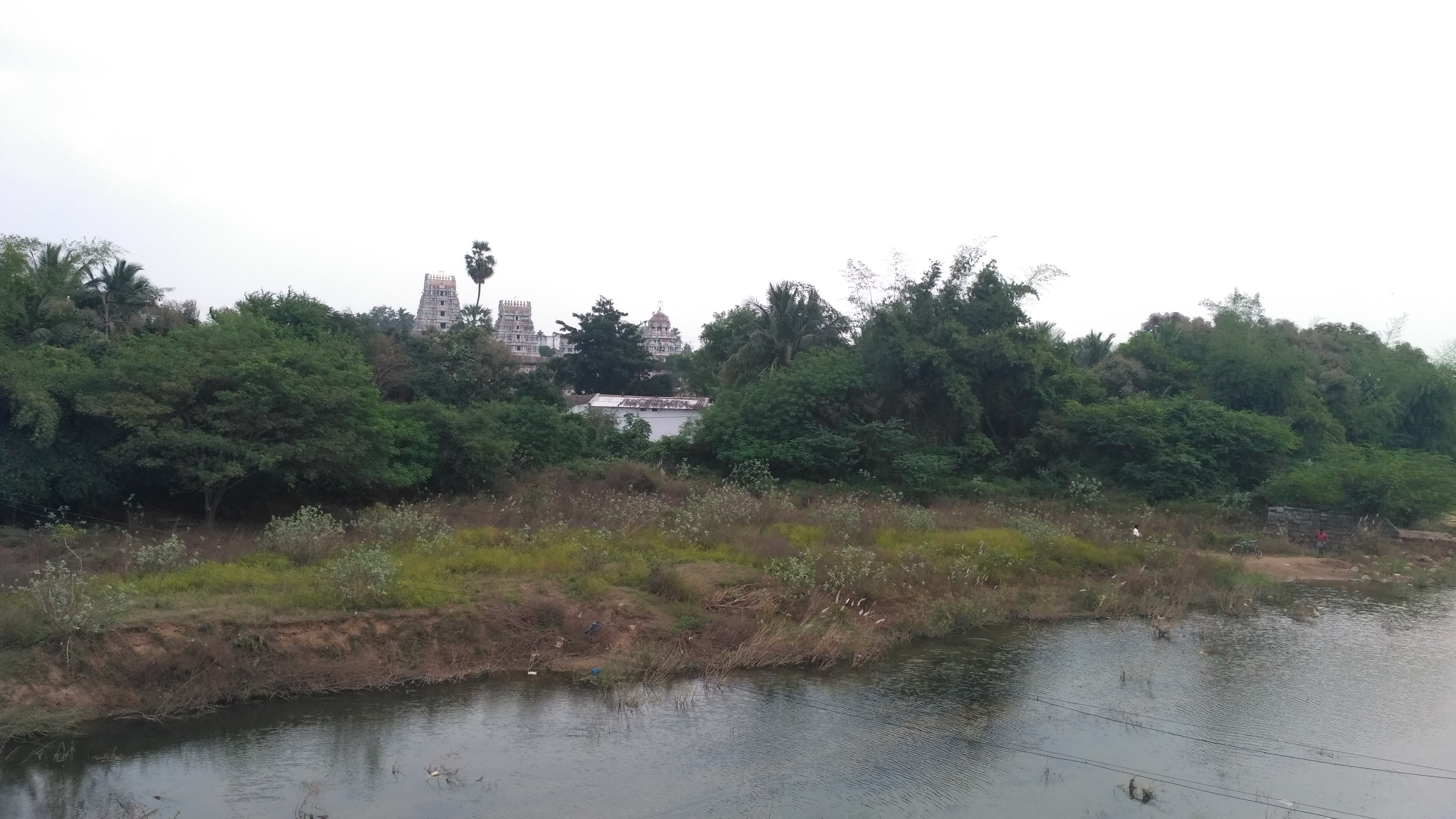
- Tiruvetipuram at Cheyyar river bank
- Nickname: River Town
- Cheyyar, Tamil Nadu
- Coordinates: 12.662000°N 79.543500°E
- Country: India
- State: Tamil Nadu
- District: Tiruvannamalai District

Government
  - Type: Second Grade Municipality
  - Body: Tiruvetipuram Municipality
- Elevation: 123 m (404 ft)

Population (2011)
  - Town: 37,802
  - Metro: 53,802

Languages
  - Official: Tamil
- Time zone: UTC+5:30 (IST)
- PIN: 604407
- Telephone code: +91-4182 / 04182
- Vehicle registration: TN-97
- Lok Sabha constituency: Arani (Lok Sabha constituency)
- Vidhan Sabha constituency: Cheyyar (State Assembly Constituency)

Cheyyar, officially Tiruvetipuram is a Town in the Tiruvannamalai District in the Tamil Nadu state of South India. The most common name of this town is Cheyyar but it is also referred to as Tiruvetipuram in many government records. The town has an ancient temple called Vedapureeswarar Temple situated on the banks of the river.

== Geography ==
Cheyyar is located at the geographical coordinates of 12.662000°N, 79.543500°E on the banks of Cheyyar River in the northeastern corner of Thiruvannamalai district of Tamil Nadu. It is 100 km southwest of Chennai the state capital.

== Climate ==
In Cheyyar, the wet season is hot, oppressive, and overcast and the dry season is sweltering, muggy, and partly cloudy. Over the course of the year, the temperature typically varies from 17 °C to 40 °C and is rarely below 15 °C or above 44 °C. The wetter season lasts 5.2 months, from 4 July to 9 December, with a greater than 27% chance of a given day being a wet day. The chance of a wet day peaks at 50% on 1 November. The drier season lasts 6.8 months, from 9 December to 4 July. The smallest chance of a wet day is 3% on 1 February.

== Demographics ==
Religious census
Religion	Percent(%)
Hindu	88.6%
Muslim	9.4%
Christian	1.11%
Sikh	0.02%
Buddhist	0.02%
Jain	0.46%
Other	0.38%
No religion	0.01%

According to 2011 census, Tiruvethipuram had a population of 53,802 with a sex-ratio of 1,014 females for every 1,000 males, much above the national average of 929. A total of 3,749 were under the age of six, constituting 1,940 males and 1,809 females. Scheduled Castes and Scheduled Tribes accounted for 12.81% and .56% of the population respectively. The average literacy of the town was 76.59%, compared to the national average of 72.99%. The town had a total of 9162 households. There were a total of 14,580 workers, comprising 294 cultivators, 489 main agricultural labourers, 1,247 in house hold industries, 11,205 other workers, 1,345 marginal workers, 20 marginal cultivators, 109 marginal agricultural labourers, 206 marginal workers in household industries and 1,010 other marginal workers. As per the religious census of 2011, Tiruvethipuram had 88.6% Hindus, 9.4% Muslims, 1.11% Christians, 0.02% Sikhs, 0.02% Buddhists, 0.46% Jains, 0.38% following other religions and 0.01% following no religion or did not indicate any religious preference.

== Economy and Industrialization ==
Cheyyar started industrialization following the establishment of the industrial complex by the State Industries Promotion Corporation of Tamil Nadu (SIPCOT). with an allottable field area of 619.35 Acres. Since the investment hot-spots such as Sriperumbudur and Oragadam have become overcrowded, Cheyyar has become an alternative hub. This is evidenced by the recent announcements of a 250-acre (1.0 km^{2}) hi-tech Special Economic Zone for automotive components, a 300-acre (1.2 km^{2}) electronics hardware park and the commitment from the Taiwanese Shoe Company to set up its unit. Aluminum die cast unit by Ashley Alteams, a joint venture by Ashok Leyland and Finland-based Alteams Oy started its production in January 2010. This High pressure die cast will manufacture automobile and telecommunication components with initial capacity of 7000 tons per year.

=== Cheyyar cooperative sugar mill ===
One of the largest sugar mills in the country - Cheyyar co-operative sugars - is situated near the town. Cheyyar Sugar mill is one of the important sugarcane processing industries in the state. A sugar refining mill as a green field distillery has been set up in Anakkavoor - Thenthandalam village. It has a processing capacity of 2500 tonnes of crushing daily (TCD) with an annual production of 19,000 tonnes of sugar as per a 2009 report.

=== Mahindra SUV Proving Track (MSPT) ===
In November 2009 Tamil Nadu cabinet approved Mahindra & Mahindra's Rs 1800 core automobile project on 450 acres. This proposed unit was to produce tractors, SUVs, commercial vehicles, and auto parts.

In 2021, the Mahindra SUV Proving Track (MSPT) built over 454 acres of land was inaugurated. The track was designed by IDIADA, (Institut d'Investigacio Aplicada de l'Automobil - Institute for Applied Automotive Research). The track will be used by Mahindra Engineers to test the SUV products.

=== Schwing Stetter ===
Schwing Stetter one of India's leading concrete equipment manufacturer have set up a manufacturing facility in Cheyyar SIPCOT. This unit of Schwing is spreading over 53 acres and allocated about 350 crores INR investment.

== Politics ==
- Cheyyar (state assembly constituency)

== See also ==
- Cheyyar River
- Vedapureeswarar Temple, Cheyyar
- Patcheeswarar temple
