= Athiyandal, Tiruvannamalai =

Athiyandal Athiyandal
- Athiyandal panchayat
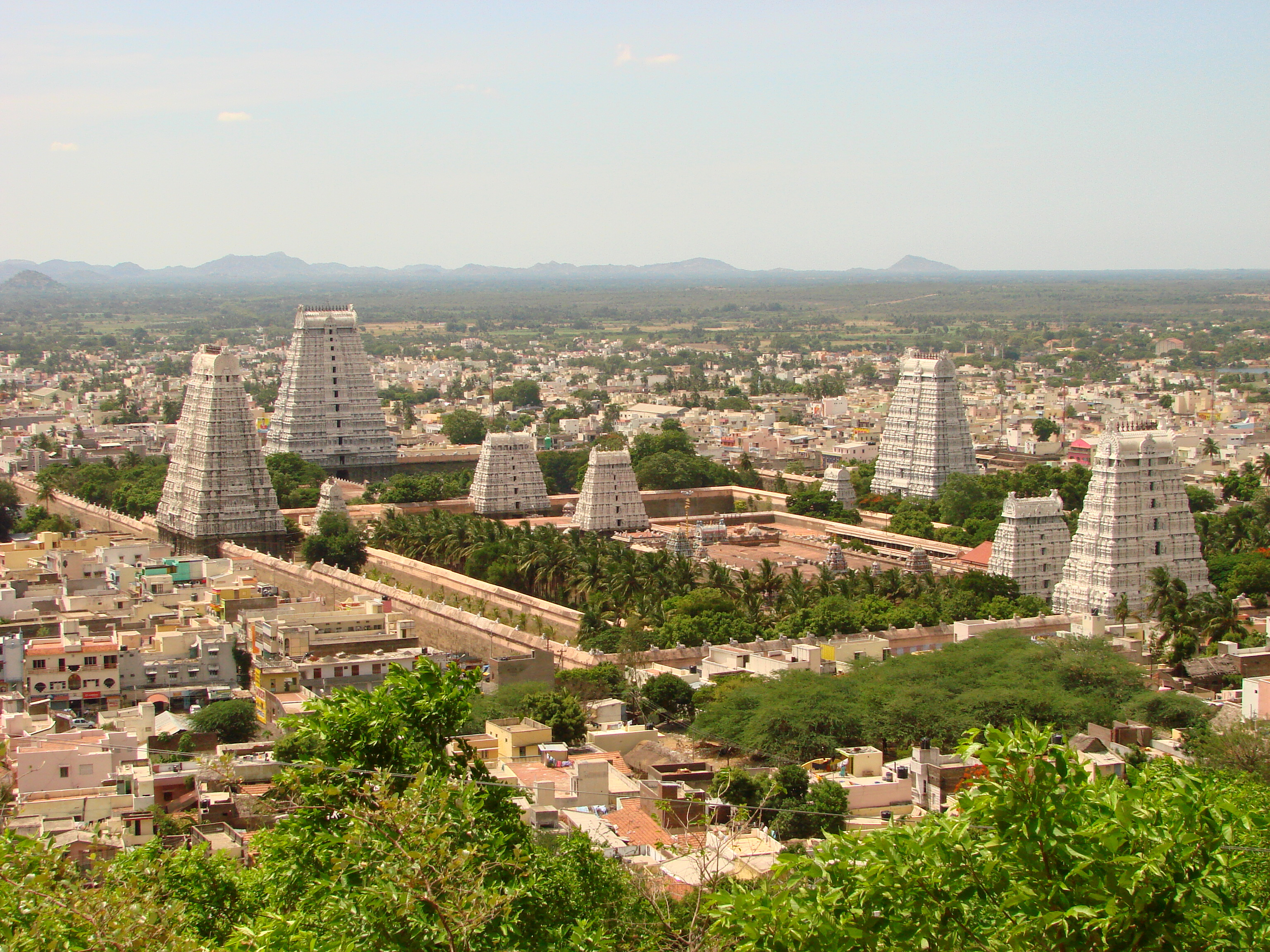
- Nickname: thenine
- Location in Tamil Nadu, India
- Coordinates: 12.24°N 79.05°E
- India: India
- State: Tamil Nadu
- District: Tiruvannamalai

Government
  - Chairman: A. M. R. RAMAKIRUSHNAN (dmk)

Area
  - Total: 16.3 km^{2} (6.3 sq mi)
- Elevation: 171 m (561 ft)

Population (2012)
  - Total: 5,901
  - Rank: 1
  - Density: 362/km^{2} (938/sq mi)

Languages
  - Official: Tamil
- Time zone: UTC+5:30 (IST)
- 606 603: 606 603
- 9952149842: 606 603
- Vehicle registration: TN 25
- Lok Sabha constituency: thiruvannamlai
- Vidhan Sabha constituency: thiruvannamalai city
- Climate: moderate (Köppen)
- Avg. summer temperature: 41 °C (106 °F)
- Avg. winter temperature: 18 °C (64 °F)

Athiyandal is a village in Tiruvannamalai taluk, Tiruvannamalai district, Tamil Nadu State. Athiyandal is 0.6 kilometres (0.37 mi) from its district main city, Tiruvannamalai. It is 157 kilometres (98 mi) from its stat main city, Chennai. The nearest towns are Thandrampet (15.2 km), Thurinjapuram (18.1 km), Kalasapakkam (23.1 km), Keelpennathur (24.4 km).

== Speciality ==
Athiyandal "Rangammal Trust" is a world-famous Britisher's trust. It provides schools, free hospitals, medical college and polytechnic colleges. "Athiyandal Rangammal Hospital" is well known after CMC to north zone people.

== Demographics ==
Athiyandal having population of around 6,000 people providing suburban to Tiruvannamalai urbanity. One of the major medical institutions in Ramana Maharshi rangammal hospital, comes under Tiruvannamalai urban agglomerations on Bengaluru road (via Chengam) NH-66. It is well known for its local railway station for Athiyandal as "Athiyandal Rangammal Campus and Hospital" shortly as "ARCH" at Girivalam railway route (local railway route to develop tourism).
