= Paramanandal =

- panchayat town
- Location in Tamil Nadu, India Paramanandal (India)
- Coordinates: 12.27°N 78.81°E
- Country: India
- State: Tamil Nadu
- District: Tiruvanamalai
- Elevation: 372 m (1,220 ft)

Population (2011)
  - Total: 9,920

Languages
  - Tamil Official: Tamil
- Time zone: UTC+5:30 (IST)
- Postal code: 606710

Paramanandal is a Panchayat town in Tiruvanamalai district, Tamil Nadu India. It is Chengam taluk's fourth largest town and had a population of 9,920 in 2011. Estimated to have a population of 11,000 in 2022. It is in the windward side of Eastern Ghats situated at an altitude of 372m. The village is on the foothills of Javadu hills, which is parts of Eastern ghats. Kuppanatham dam is 9 kilometers from Paramanandal.
