= Kuppanatham Dam =

Dam in Tamil Nadu, India

Kuppanatham Dam Thurinjikuppam village T
- township
- Location in Tamil Nadu, India Kuppanatham Dam (India)
- Coordinates: 12.42°N 78.77°E
- Country: India
- State: Tamil Nadu
- District: Tiruvanamalai
- Elevation: 435 m (1,427 ft)

Population (2001)
  - Total: 3,200

Languages
  - Official: Tamil
- Time zone: UTC+5:30 (IST)
- Postal code: 606710

Kuppanatham Dam is a partially completed dam situated in Tiruvannamalai district, Tamil Nadu, India. The nearest town is Chengam Taluk's Paramanandal. The dam was built 1987 on the in Solai River. Today it is rewarded as township with population over 300. It is in the altitude of 435m. The government has plans to finish the dam in the future.
