= Sacred Heart Church, Hosur =

Roman Catholic Church in Tamil Nadu, India

Sacred Heart Church
- தூய இருதய ஆண்டவர் ஆலயம்
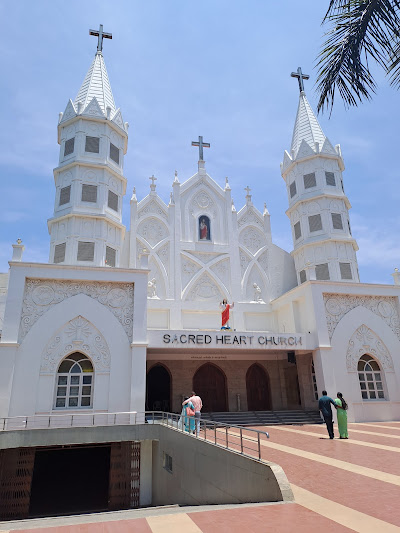
- Sacred Heart Church
- 12.72332°N 77.82365°E
- Location: Hosur, Tamil Nadu
- Country: India
- Denomination: Catholic
- Tradition: Latin rites

History
- Status: Parish church
- Founded: 1977
- Founder: Fr. Johannes G

Architecture
- Functional status: Active
- Architectural type: Church
- Style: Medieval
- Groundbreaking: 2009
- Completed: 2012

Administration
- District: Krishnagiri
- Archdiocese: Pondicherry and Cuddalore
- Diocese: Dharmapuri
- Deanery: Hosur
- Parish: Hosur

Clergy
- Archbishop: Francis Kalist
- Bishop: Lawrence Pius Dorairaj
- Priest: Fr. M. George

Sacred Heart Church is a Roman Catholic Parish church located in Hosur, Tamil Nadu, India. It falls under the jurisdiction of the Diocese of Dharmapuri. The church serves as a spiritual and community center for the Catholic population in and around South East Hosur.

== History ==
Before 1960, there is no record of any Christian or Catholic presence in Hosur. As the town developed industrially, people from Tamil Nadu, Andhra Pradesh, Karnataka, and other parts of India migrated to Hosur for employment and settlement. Among these migrants were several Catholic families.

== Formation of the Parish ==
Initially, the spiritual needs of the Catholics in Hosur were served by the priests from Mathigiri Parish. To provide a permanent place of worship, T. C. Joseph, then parish priest of Mathigiri, purchased 0.50 cents of land on Denkanikottai Road on 18 March 1975. Under the supervision of priest Johannes Gopu, assistant parish priest of Mathigiri, a church was built on the site in 1977 and dedicated to the Sacred Heart of Jesus by Michael Bosco, Bishop of Salem.

In June 1979, Hosur was established as an independent parish with Onnalvadi and Chennathur as its sub-stations. The first parish priest was Rev. Fr. A. Joseph, who resided in the sacristy until a proper presbytery was constructed.

== Growth and Development ==
Under the leadership of successive parish priests, the church and community expanded:

- 1985 – Fr. I. Mariasusai purchased land and established St. Mary’s Nagar, a residential colony, along with a chapel and a church bell. Land was also purchased in Bagalur (1.25 acres for a church and 3 acres for a school), and Bagalur was later formed as a sub-parish.
- 1989–1991 – During the tenure of Fr. S. Francis Xavier, the Our Lady of Perpetual Help Church at Onnalvadi was consecrated.
- Fr. M. Dominic improved the main church with mosaic flooring, a belfry, and roofing for the Sipcot St. Joseph’s Church.
- N. S. Irudayanathan expanded the presbytery.
- Fr. S. Henry George purchased 1.5 acres of land for a cemetery and built a presbytery at Onnalvadi.
- Subsequently, Bagalur (10 April 1999), Sipcot (12 July 2000), and Onnalvadi (30 August 2002) became independent parishes.

== Construction of the New Church ==
Under the leadership of Fr. R. Arul Raj, and with the cooperation of the local Catholic community, a new and larger church was planned. The old church and presbytery were demolished to make way for new structures, including a presbytery, main church, and a Chapel of Our Lady of Health.

The foundation stone for the new church was blessed and laid on 6 September 2009 by Joseph Anthony Irudayaraj SDB., Bishop of Dharmapuri. The completed church was inaugurated on 20 August 2012 by Lawrence Pius, the next Bishop of Dharmapuri.

Fr. R. Arul Raj also purchased 1 acre of land in Divine Nagar, where he built the St. Teresa of the Child Jesus Church and a community hall, later elevated as a separate parish.

In November 2023, Rev. Fr. M. George constructed a chapel in the cemetery to facilitate funeral services and prayer gatherings.

== Religious Congregations and Educational Service ==
The Franciscan Servants of Mary (FSM) from Mathigiri began their mission in Hosur in 1962 by opening a nursery school. Initially, the sisters traveled daily from Mathigiri but later built small huts to reside locally. In 1965, the school was upgraded to St. John Bosco Primary School, and in 1976, a new convent building was constructed. Then this school was later upgraded to Middle School in 1979; High School in 1998; Higher Secondary School in 2006. In addition to educational work, the FSM sisters run a hostel for working women in Hosur .

The Little Sisters of Jesus established their convent in Hosur in 1982 for church service.

== See also ==
- Our Lady of Lourdes Church, Hosur
- Our Lady of Good Health Church, Mathigiri
- Sacred Heart Church, Madagondapalli
