= Our Lady of Good Health Church, Mathigiri =

Roman Catholic Church in Tamil Nadu, India

Our Lady of Good Health Church
- Arokiya Annai Alayam
- ஆரோக்கிய அன்னை ஆலயம்
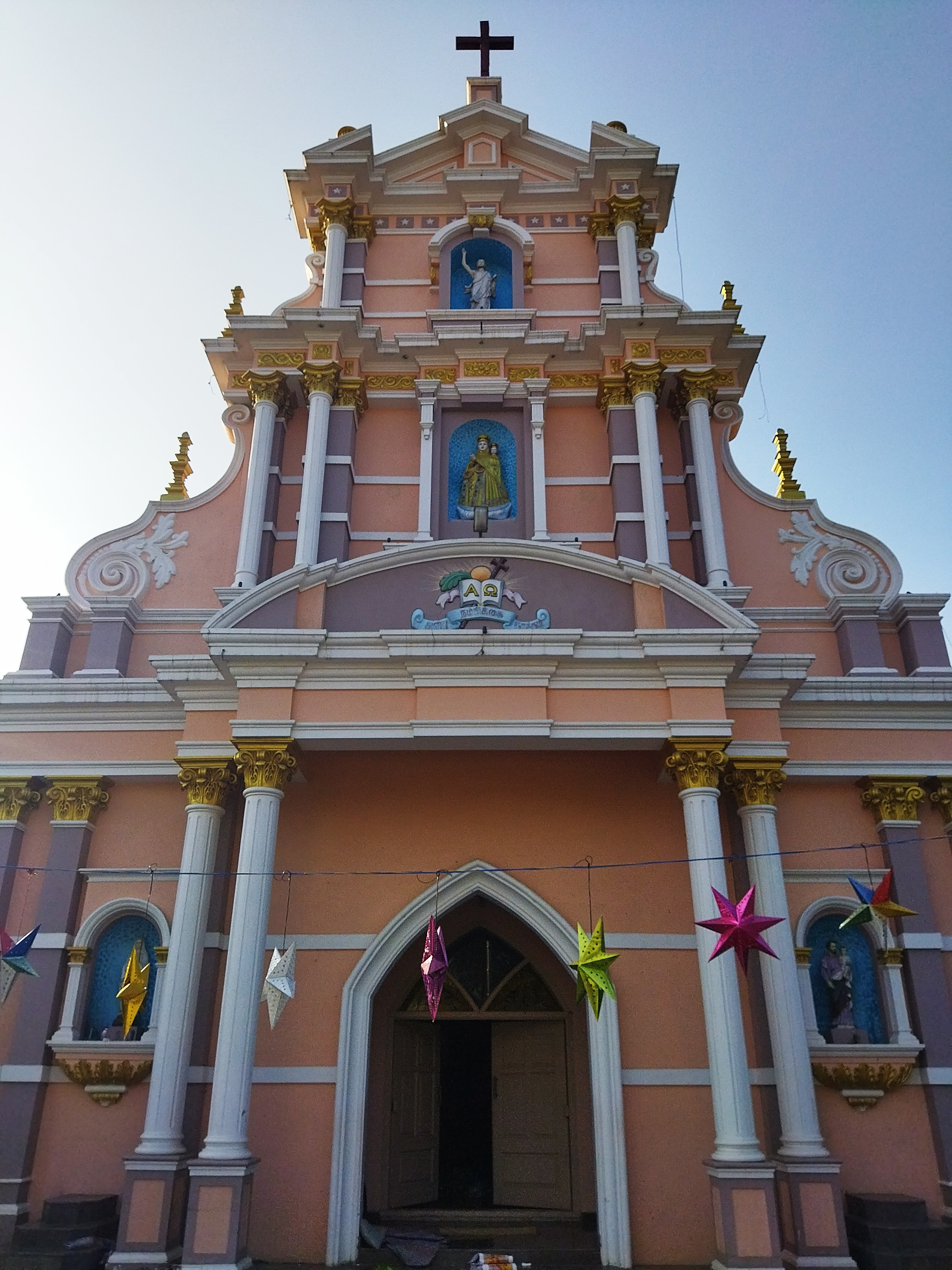
- Front View of this church
- Our Lady of Good Health Church
- 12.69695°N 77.8069°E
- Location: Mathigiri, Hosur, Krishnagiri district, Tamil Nadu
- Country: India
- Denomination: Catholic
- Religious institute: Jesuit

History
- Status: Parish
- Founded: 1837
- Founder: Fr. Étienne-Louis Charbonnaux
- Dedication: St. Mary

Architecture
- Functional status: Active
- Architectural type: Church
- Style: Renaissance architecture
- Groundbreaking: 1999
- Completed: 2001

Administration
- Archdiocese: Pondicherry and Cuddalore
- Diocese: Dharmapuri
- Deanery: Hosur
- Parish: Mathigiri

Clergy
- Archbishop: Francis Kalist
- Bishop: Lawrence Pius Dorairaj
- Priest: Fr. Bosco Madalaimuthu

The Our Lady of Good Health Church is a Roman Catholic church situated in Mathigiri, a suburban area adjacent to Hosur, Tamil Nadu, India. According to Catholic Missionary records, Mathigiri holds a rich historical significance due to the presence of M.E.P Fathers who established settlements in the early 19th century. This is considered to be the mother parish church of Hosur and Denkanikottai belt. Now this serves under the jurisdiction of Dharmapuri Diocese.

== History ==
After the conclusion of the Third Anglo-Mysore War, the Baramahal region came under British control. Following this period, several Christian settlements began to emerge around Hosur. Concurrently, the MEP congregation initiated their missionary work in Begur, Annekal, and Mathigiri. In 1837, a church was established in Mathigiri under the guidance of Fr. Étienne-Louis Charbonnaux, who later became the first bishop of the Mysore diocese in 1850. In 1862, Mathigiri attained parish status, with Fr. Renaudin MEP serving as its first parish priest. These priests from Mathigiri also extended their religious services to the people in Hosur, Onnalvadi, Kelamangalam, and other nearby villages.

The first church, built in 1837, became dilapidated and too small to accommodate the growing congregation. Consequently, the fathers purchased land in the neighboring village of Kudharaipalayam and constructed a new church in 1924 under the leadership of Fr. A. Nauroy MEP. During the same year, the celebration of St. Mary's festival on September 8 was initiated. At that time, Mathigiri was part of the Diocese of Mysore. However, when the Salem Diocese was newly established in 1930, Mathigiri parish came under its jurisdiction. In 1937, during Fr. Brun MEP's tenure, a parish house was constructed adjacent to the church.

In 1974, under the leadership of Fr. Thomas Keeranchira, the church celebrated its 50th anniversary. During this celebration, Salem Diocese Bishop Michael Bosco Duraisamy and Pondicherry Diocese Archbishop Venmani S. Selvanather were in attendance. Noting the population growth in Hosur during Fr. TC Joseph's tenure, a new church was constructed in Hosur in 1978, and in the same year, it was designated as the Parish Church of Hosur. Subsequently, Parish Priest Fr. Alexander Xavi built a chapel in Chennathur village and initiated the groundbreaking for the Kelamangalam Sacred Heart Church.

During Fr. Legrand MEP's tenure, Hosur town underwent rapid development, leading to the growth of this neighboring village of Mathigiri. Recognizing the increasing Catholic population in the Mathigiri parish and anticipating the need for a new church in the main village area, Fr. Legrand, with the assistance of Kristhupalayam parish priest Fr. Irudya Selvam, acquired nearly 4 acres of land in Netaji Nagar. The present parish church was constructed on this land. Subsequently, during Fr. R. Domnic Raja's tenure, the 75th anniversary was celebrated, and it was announced to the parishioners that a new church would be built in Netaji Nagar, which would serve as the future parish church of Mathigiri. Following this announcement, construction was in 1999, and the church was completed on May 12, 2001. The church was opened to the public and blessed by Dharmapuri Diocese Bishop Joseph Anthony Irudayaraj. In 2002, Onnalvadi St. Antony's Church, a former substation of Mathigiri Parish, was elevated to the status of a Parish Church, and Chennathur Church became part of Onnalvadi Parish.

In 2002, during Fr. Rosario's tenure, a community hall was constructed within the church campus with the support of social activist J.C. Antony. In 2016, during Fr. John Kennedy's tenure, the church's altar and front portion underwent renovation and church gets its new look. Subsequently, Fr. Periyanayagam, the next Parish priest, initiated the establishment of a Xavier CBSE school near the church, which has since become a middle school for the village. Currently, the parish is preparing for its 100th-anniversary celebration.

== Heritage Church ==
The Our Lady of Good Health church, which served the community from 1924 to 2001, had been unused for many years. In 2015, this church underwent renovation during Fr. John Kennedy's tenure. Dharmapuri Diocese Bishop Lawrence Pius designated this church as a Heritage Church and dedicated it to retired priests of Dharmapuri. A hostel was constructed near this church, primarily used for retired priests' Mass purposes.

== Convent ==
In 1962, at the invitation of Fr. Quinquinel MEP France, the Franciscan Servants of Mary also called as FSM Sisters arrived in Mathigiri and started their Fatima Convent and began John Bosco girls school in Hosur. For two decades, the sisters commuted from Mathigiri to Hosur school daily. Later, when the Hosur Parish was established, they founded a new convent to continue their service in Hosur. Meanwhile, in Mathigiri, they established a dispensary for the villagers and initiated a tailoring training school for women's empowerment. In 1991, they launched a Fatima primary school in Mathigiri.

== See also ==
- Our Lady of Lourdes Church, Hosur
- Our Lady of Lourdes Church, Hosur
- St. Francis Xavier Church, Kovilur
