= Sacred Heart Church, Madagondapalli =

Roman Catholic Church in Tamil Nadu, India

Sacred Heart Church
- திரு இருதய ஆண்டவர் ஆலயம்
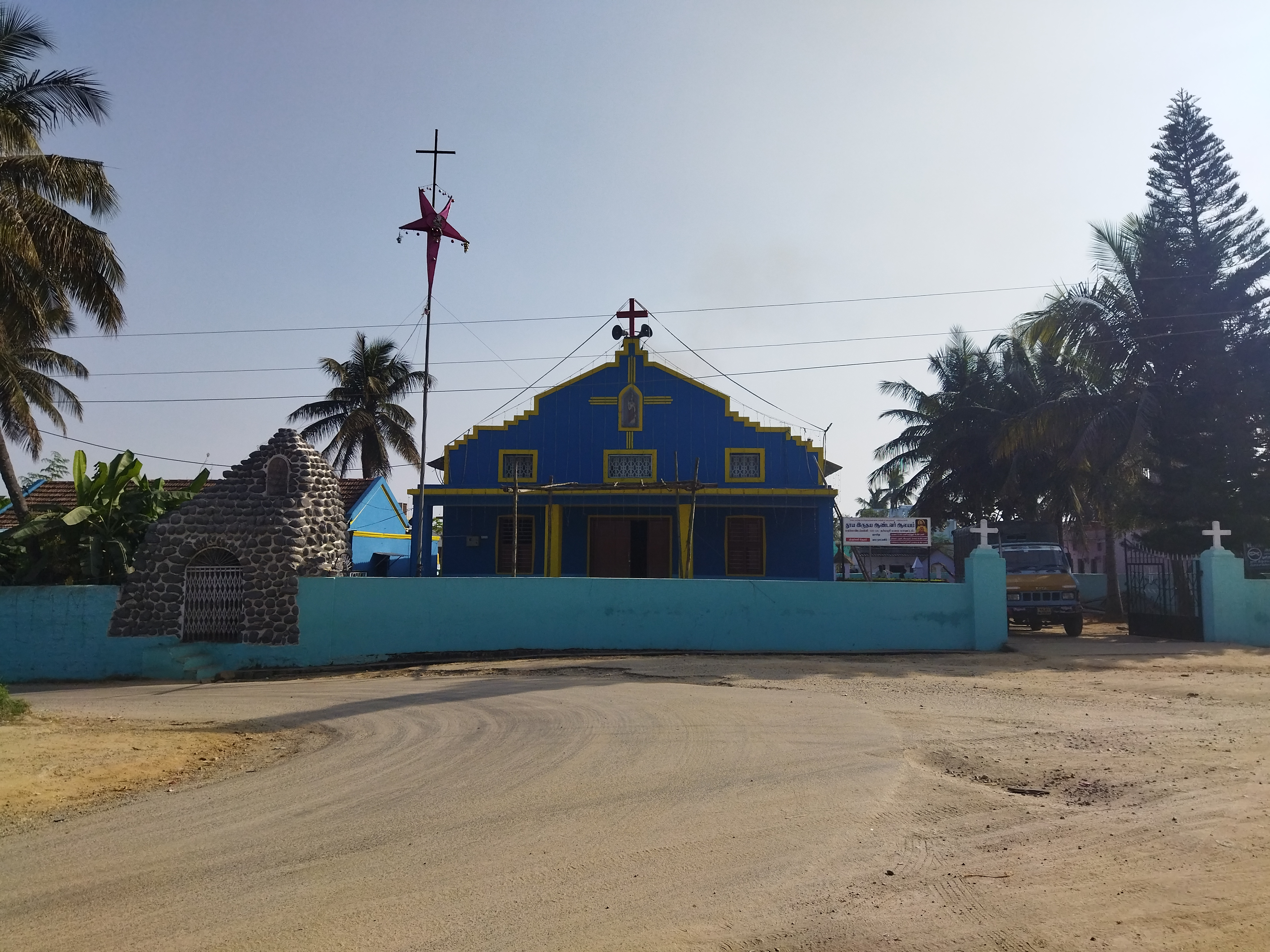
- Front view of this church
- Sacred Heart Church
- 12.6276246°N 77.7315573°E
- Location: Mathagondapalli, Thally, Krishnagiri, Tamil Nadu
- Country: India
- Denomination: Catholic
- Religious order: Jesuit

History
- Status: Parish church
- Founded: 1930
- Founder(s): Fr. Billyard and Fr. Issac
- Dedication: Jesus Christ

Architecture
- Functional status: Active
- Architectural type: Church
- Style: Modern Architecture
- Groundbreaking: 1975
- Completed: 1976

Administration
- Archdiocese: Pondicherry and Cuddalore
- Diocese: Dharmapuri
- Deanery: Denkanikottai
- Parish: Mathagondapalli

Clergy
- Archbishop: Francis Kalist
- Bishop: Lawrence Pius Dorairaj
- Priest: Fr. Arputharaj

Sacred Heart Church, Madagondapall, is one of the earliest Catholic churches within the Dharmapuri Diocese, boasting a 143-year legacy. For over 96 years, it has served as a parish church, offering a sacred space for Catholics to gather in worship.

== History ==
After the invasion of Tipu Sultan in the 1780s, Catholic settlements disappeared in the Hosur and Denkanikotta areas. Additionally, the people in Kappinagathi and Edapalli, near Kelamangalam, also left out of Tippu Sultan's Mysore region.

== Madagondapalli Settlement ==
The establishment of the Madagondapalli (Madagondanahalli) catholic settlement is recorded by Fr. M.S Joseph, who stated that it took place around 1794 during the decline of Tippu Sultan. In 1799, Paris Missionarian Fr. Abe Dubey, a historian, mentioned this place when he was traveling towards Mysore. Historian Adrien Launay, in his book, mentioned that in the 1830s, Vicar. Charbonnaux assigned Fr. Antony to take charge of the Srirangapatnam parish. On his way to Mysore - Srirangapitina from Pondicherry, Fr. Antony observed and documented how the Catholics of Hosur and Denkanikotta had relocated and settled in Palacode and Madagondapalli. They continued their religious practices with the help of often visiting missionaries from Mathigiri.

In 1845, the Apostolic Vicariate of Mysore was formed as a suffragan of the Pondicherry Apostolic Vicariate, and during that time, Bangalore, Hosur, and Denkanikotai came under the administration of Mysore. After being consecrated as the First Bishop of Mysore in Pondicherry, Bishop Charbonnaux visited Madagondapalli on his way to Mysore. At that time, Madagondapalli was under the Bangalore Deanery.

Due to a lack of priests in the Bangalore deanery for some years, Madagondapalli came under the charge of Kovilur Church. In the 1840s, Fr. Pierre Gouyon, a Kovilur priest, was also assigned to take charge of Rayakottai, Edappally, Mathigiri, Madagondapalli, Dasarapalli, and Denkanikottai areas. Later, Mysore missionaries from Begur, Anekal, and Mathigiri took care of Madagondapalli.

== Parish ==
Until 1930, Madagondapalli remained under the jurisdiction of the Mysore Diocese as a substation of Mathigiri. It then came under the administration of the newly formed Diocese of Salem and became a parish church. In September 1930, Fr. Billyard resided in Madagondapalli and became the first parish priest of Madagondapalli Church. During that time, the Madagondapalli parish extended its area to include the present Denkanikottai vicar, encompassing regions from Thally-Avaripalli to Rayakottai.

When the Salem Diocese was formed in 1930, Bishop Henry Prunier requested Fr. Thalachira to work for the Salem Diocese. Later, in 1954, he became the parish priest of Madagondapalli. On December 24, 1960, he died and was buried here. His tomb is located in front of this church.

The present church was built during the tenure of Fr. Sr. Issac; it opened in 1976.

For many decades, Gopasandiram was a substation of this parish. In 1937, a small chapel was built for Gopasandiram Catholic, and on January 14, 2014, a new church was constructed in the name of Vinnarasi Annai Church, turning Gopasandiram into a Quazi parish.

== FSM Sisters ==
In 1937, in response to an invitation from Most Rev. Henry Prunier, the then-Bishop of Salem, Franciscan Servants of Mary Sisters started a medical service with a small dispensary in Madagondapalli. In 1968, Bishop Selvanather of Salem offered land to the sisters, who then built Lordus Hospital in 1971. In 1957, the sisters also began a primary school in the town, and in 1987, a new high school was established, which has now become a higher secondary school. They continue to serve the church and the local society.

== See also ==
Our Lady Of Queen Of Heaven Church, Gopasandiram
