= Beerepalli =

Beerepalli may refer to:

- Beerepalli, Anantapur, a village in Andhra Pradesh, India
- Beerepalli, Krishnagari, a village in Tamil Nadu, India
