= Our Lady of Lourdes Church, Hosur =

Roman Catholic Church in Tamil Nadu, India

Our Lady of Lourdes Church
- லூர்து அன்னை ஆலயம்
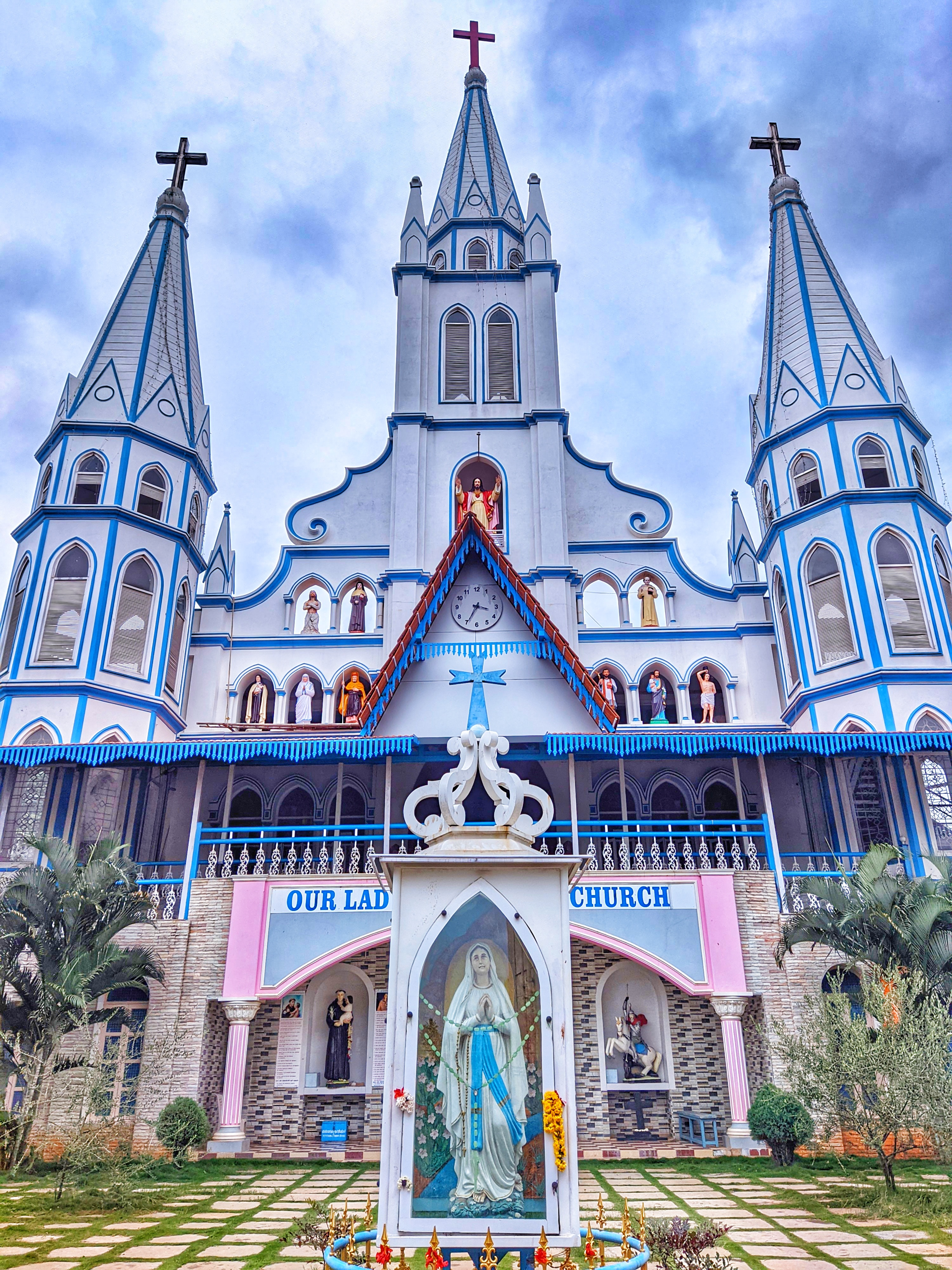
- Front View of this church
- Our Lady of Lourdes Church
- 12.75659°N 77.82580°E
- Location: Hosur, Tamil Nadu
- Country: India
- Denomination: Catholic
- Religious institute: Jesuit

History
- Status: Parish church
- Founded: 2000
- Founder: Fr. Lourde Samy
- Dedication: Our Lady of Lourdes

Architecture
- Functional status: Active
- Architectural type: Church
- Style: Gothic architecture
- Groundbreaking: 2007
- Completed: 2015

Administration
- Archdiocese: Pondicherry and Cuddalore
- Diocese: Dharmapuri
- Deanery: Hosur
- Parish: Hosur - SIPCOT

Clergy
- Archbishop: Francis Kalist
- Bishop: Lawrence Pius Dorairaj
- Priest: Fr. S. Mariya Joseph

Our Lady of Lourdes Church is located in the SIPCOT-1 area of Hosur, in the Krishnagiri district of Tamil Nadu, India. This church provides services to the north-western region of Hosur, catering to the Roman Catholic Christian community. Initially, it served as a sub-station of Sacred Heart Church in Hosur. However, due to the growing Catholic population, it was elevated to the status of a parish church in Hosur. Currently, the church falls under the administration of Dharmapuri Diocese.

== History ==
=== St. Joseph Church ===
The history of this parish traces back to St. Joseph Church, which no longer exists, but was established to cater to the increasing Catholic population in the SIPCOT area of Hosur. At that time, Catholics from Zuzuwadi and Achettipalli faced difficulties attending Mass at the distant Hosur Sacred Heart Church. To address this, Father Mariya Soosai acquired a piece of land near Dharga, Hosur. In the 1980s, a chapel named St. Joseph the Worker was constructed on this land. Masses were held here every Wednesday. Unfortunately, the chapel was destroyed by a fire after a few years.

In 2000, the SIPCOT Parish was created as a separate entity from the Hosur Parish due to the lack of space to meet the basic needs of a parish, such as a cemetery and a presbytery. Father Arulraj was appointed as the first parish priest of SIPCOT in 2000. In 2001, Father Mathiyas took over and made efforts to construct a new church in the parish. However, the plan faced numerous obstacles and had to be abandoned. Subsequently, the Diocese decided to purchase new land for the parish.

During the tenure of Father Mathiyas, three acres of land were acquired in Chinna Elasagiri - Balaji Nagar. Out of this, two acres were designated for residential purposes, while one acre was allotted for the construction of a church in the name of Lourdes.

=== Present Church ===
In 2007, Father Lourde Samy was appointed as the third parish priest for Hosur-SIPCOT. The former Bishop of Dharmapuri, Joseph Anthony Irudayaraj, initiated the construction of the church, and the groundbreaking ceremony took place in the same year. The plan was to replicate the architectural style of the Sanctuary of Our Lady of Lourdes church in France. Additionally, the construction included a parish house and a community hall beneath the church.

The funds for the construction came from contributions made by the people and the proceeds generated from the sale of residential plots. Over a span of eight years, under the leadership of Father Lourde Samy, the construction of the church gradually neared completion. Finally, in 2015, with the blessings of Bishop Lawrence Pius Dorairaj of Dharmapuri, the church was officially opened for public worship and service. In November 2018, the Archbishop Emeritus of Madras-Mylapore Malayappan Chinnappa visited the church.

== See also ==
- Sacred Heart Church, Hosur
- Our Lady of Good Health Church, Mathigiri
- Our Lady of Fatima Church, Krishnagiri
