= Kurubarapalli =

Coordinates: 12°36′01″N 78°07′53″E

- village
- Interactive map of Kurubarapalli
- Country: India
- State: Tamil Nadu
- District: Krishnagiri

Population (2011)
  - Total: 5,354

Languages
  - Official: Tamil
- Time zone: UTC+5:30 (IST)

Kurubarapalli is a village in the Hosur taluk of Krishnagiri district, Tamil Nadu, India. A census of 2011, it had a population of 5,354 residents.

== Demographics ==
The 2011 census recorded 5,354 residents, 2,760 males and 2,594 females. There were 742 children aged 0–6, and 502 members of scheduled castes. The literacy rate of 67.22% was lower than the state average of 80.99%.
