= Michael Augustine (bishop) =

Indian prelate of the Catholic Church (1933–2017)

The Most Reverend Savarinathan Michael Augustine
- Archbishop of Pondicherry and Cuddalore
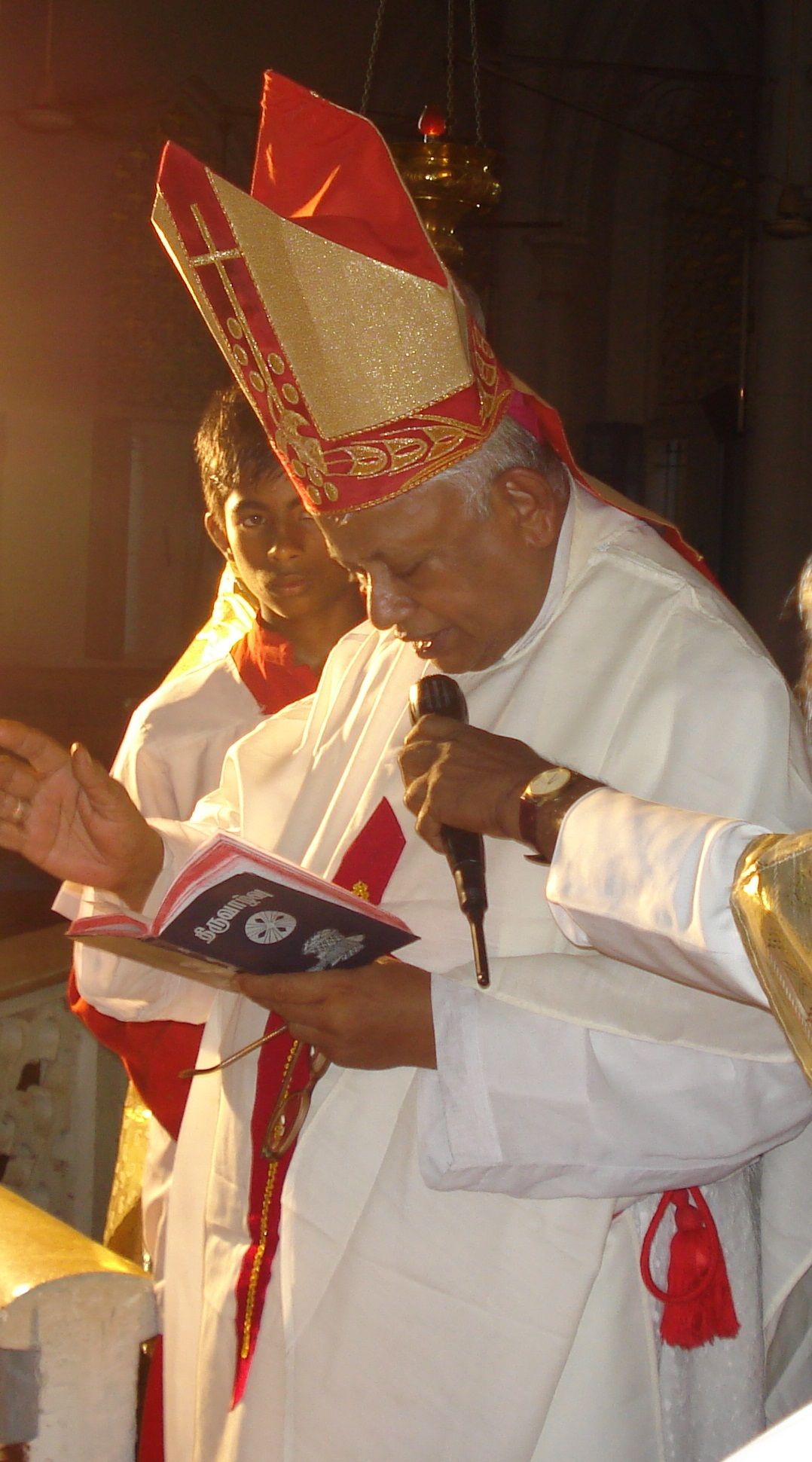
- Church: Catholic Church
- See: Pondicherry and Cuddalore
- Installed: 25 June 1992
- Term ended: 10 June 2004
- Predecessor: Venmani S. Selvanather
- Successor: Antony Anandarayar
- Other posts: Sous-Director of Petit Seminaire Higher Secondary School; Vice-Rector of St. Peter Pontifical Seminary; Rector of St. Peter Pontifical Seminary; Auxiliary bishop of Madras – Mylapore; Bishop of Vellore

Orders
- Ordination: 15 April 1961 by Ambrose Rayappan
- Consecration: 29 March 1978 by Duraisamy Simon Card. Lourdusamy
- Rank: Archbishop

Personal details
- Born: 12 June 1933 Kovilanoor, Tamil Nadu, India
- Died: 4 November 2017 (aged 84) Pondicherry, India
- Buried: Cathedral Cemetery, Pondicherry
- Education: Petit Seminaire Higher Secondary School; St Joseph's College, Tiruchirappalli; St. Agnes (Minor) Seminary; St. Peter Pontifical Seminary l'Institut Catholique de Paris
- Motto: "Fiat" means Let Lord's will be done
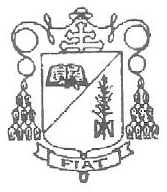
- Coat of arms: Savarinathan Michael Augustine's coat of arms

Savarinathan Michael Augustine (12 June 1933 – 4 November 2017) was an Indian prelate of the Catholic Church. He served as the Archbishop of Pondicherry and Cuddalore from 1992 to 2004. He was an honorary member of the Society of Foreign Missions of Paris. He served the church for 39 years as a bishop and for 56 years as a priest. He died on 4 November 2017.

Augustine was sometimes referred to as the "People's Bishop", and "Bishop of the poor." He was fluent in English, French, Tamil, and Latin. He was a Tamil scholar, as well as a lyricist, poet, writer, singer, pianist, magician and artist.

== Early life ==
Augustine was born on 12 June 1933 in Kovilanoor, in the Pondicherry-Cuddalore Archdiocese.

Augustine started his school career at Petit Seminaire Higher Secondary School, Pondicherry and then joined the minor seminary at St. Agnes Seminary, Cuddalore. He graduated from St. Joseph's College, Tiruchirapalli and did his philosophical and theological studies at St.Peter's Pontifical Seminary, in Bangalore. He was ordained a priest for Archdiocese of Pondicherry and Cuddalore on 15 April 1961 by Monsignor Ambrose, then Archbishop of Pondicherry and Cuddalore at Immaculate Conception Cathedral, Pondicherry. After ordination, he was appointed as Sous — Director of Petit Seminaire Higher Secondary School, Pondicherry. Augustine later went to Paris for higher studies in philosophy at l'Institut Catholique de Paris, France and obtained his licentiate in philosophy. On his return to India in 1965, he was appointed a professor of philosophy at St. Peter’s Pontifical Seminary in Bangalore. He later earned his doctorate on Indian philosophy. Within a year, he became vice-rector at St. Peter's Pontifical Seminary, the office he remained until he became rector of the same seminary.

== Ministry ==
Styles of Michael Augustine
- Reference style: The Most Reverend
- Spoken style: Your Grace
- Religious style: Monsignor

In 1974, Pope Paul VI appointed him as the Rector of St. Peter's Pontifical Seminary, Bangalore. He stayed there until 1978 when he was consecrated as the Auxiliary Bishop of Madras and Mylapore. On 30 January 1978, Pope Paul VI appointed Augustine as the Auxiliary Bishop of Madras and Mylapore to assist Archbishop Arullappa and bestowed upon him the titular see of Barrus. He was consecrated a bishop by then-Archbishop Duraisamy Simon Lourdusamy (later Cardinal) the then Secretary of the Congregation for the Evangelization of Peoples on 29 March 1978. He was appointed as bishop of the Vellore on 10 July 1981 by Pope John Paul II. Pope John Paul II appointed Augustine as the Metropolitan Archbishop of Pondicherry and Cuddalore on 25 June 1992. He received the pallium from his predecessor, Archbishop Emeritus Venmani S. Selvanather, at the Cathedral of Pondicherry Archdiocese. On 10 June 2004, he voluntarily resigned as the Archbishop of the Archdiocese of Pondicherry and Cuddalore (India), citing medical reasons.

== Episcopal ministry at Archdiocese of Madras-Mylapore (1978–81) ==
On 30 January 1978, Pope Paul VI appointed Augustine as the Auxiliary Bishop of Madras-Mylapore Archdiocese to assist Archbishop Arullappa and bestowed upon him the titular see of Barrus. He was consecrated a bishop at the age of 45 years by then-Archbishop Duraisamy Simon Lourdusamy (later Cardinal) with co-consecrators Archbishop Venmani S. Selvanather of Pondicherry and Archbishop Anthony Rayappa Arulappa of Madras as on 29 March 1978, the episcopal ordination mass was attended by many bishops from Tamil Nadu, Karnataka and Pondicherry regions and many priests and laity attended. He chose "FIAT", meaning "Let Lord's will be done", as his Episcopal motto. Under the guidance of Archbishop Arullappa, Augustine learnt many things and served as an auxiliary bishop for nearly three years.

== Episcopal ministry at Diocese of Vellore (1981–92) ==
On 19 June 1981, Augustine, till then Auxiliary Bishop of Madras-Mylapore, was appointed by the Pope John Paul II as the fourth Bishop of the Diocese of Vellore. The installation service took place on 24 July 1981 at 6 p.m. in the Cathedral Campus at Vellore.

Augustine was the Bishop of Vellore for almost 11 years. During his time there, almost 100 churches and chapels were built, along with six convents and dispensaries and three high schools, and five elementary schools were upgraded to middle schools.

He noticed that many Catholics do not hold high positions. To improve this, he started summer coaching classes for the students who finished school. These coaching classes helped many people get into medicine, nursing, engineering and other technical training. He also established a scholarship fund for professional studies. He believed children should have a strong foundation in their education, so he started coaching classes for high school children. The coaching classes were conducted for a month. The whole expenses were met by the projects and Diocesan contributions.

To foster local vocations, he started a minor seminary at Pathiavaram. As the Tamil Nadu Bishops decided to have the college education as minimum qualification for major seminary admission, a seminary was started at Koviloor so that the students can attend Sacred Heart College, Tirupattur. He was transferred and promoted as Archbishop of Pondicherry and Cuddalore on 24 March 1992. He remained administrator of Vellore Diocese till 25 June 1992.

== Episcopal ministry at Archdiocese of Pondicherry and Cuddalore (1992–2004) ==
Pope John Paul II elevated Augustine as Archbishop of Pondicherry and Cuddalore on 18 February 1992 and he was installed as Archbishop of Pondicherry and Cuddalore on 25 June 1992. During his 12 years of episcopacy, he laid foundations for 2 new vicariates and 14 new parishes, and he invited 13 new religious congregations to work in the Archdiocese.

After 12 years of pastoral care in Pondicherry, he submitted his resignation citing medical reasons and Pope John Paul II accepted his resignation from the Metropolitan See of Pondicherry and Cuddalore on 10 June 2004. However, he remained as the Apostolic Administrator of the Archdiocese until 5 July 2004, the day of the canonical possession of his successor.

== Post-retirement ==
After his retirement as Archbishop of Pondicherry and Cuddalore, Augustine stayed in his retirement home which is behind Holy Family Church, Keezhputhupattu in the outskirts of Pondicherry near Kalapet. During these years, Father A. J. C. Lawrence (his nephew and clergy of Pondicherry) also helped him.

He composed two books of Psalms during this period namely "The Psalm of a Priest" and "The Psalm of a Bishop."

== Death and funeral ==
In September 2017, he was admitted in "Be Well Hospital", Pondicherry but was later discharged and was taking rest in the Archbishop’s House. On 4 November 2017, the morning after he complained of uneasiness to his helper, he was rushed to the hospital where he died at 9:50 a.m. when Anandarayar completed the prayer by making the sign of the cross in the presence of Father A. J. C. Lawrence.

His remains were immediately embalmed in PIMS, Pondicherry and was taken first to his retirement home where Eucharist was celebrated following which his remains were brought to the Archbishop's House in Pondicherry and kept there until 6 p.m. His remains were then transferred to Escande Hall in Petit Seminaire Higher Secondary School, Pondicherry at 6:30 p.m. for public veneration. Massive crowds poured in to pay tribute and last respects. Archbishop George Antonysamy of Madras, Bishop Peter Abir of Sulthanpet, Bishop Antony Devotta of Trichy, Bishop Emeritus Peter Remigius of Kottar visited, prayed and paid their last respects. His remains remained there until 9:50 a.m. on 6 November 2017.

Several Archbishops, Bishops, Priests, religious laity and people of other faith attended his funeral on 6 November 2017. The funeral procession began from Petit Seminaire School and ended in the Cathedral of Pondicherry.

During the funeral mass, Bishop Sebastianappan Singaroyan (student of Augustine at St.Peter's Pontifical Seminary, Bangalore) preached a sermon on the sanctity, sincerity and love of Augustine and on his life of FIAT.

After the funeral mass, Archbishop Chinnappa sung in Latin the final rites inside the cathedral. The eulogy was read by Archbishop Antony Pappusamy, Bishop Soundarajan, Archbishop Anandarayar, CRI President of Pondicherry, Fr. Arulselvam Rayappan of St. Peter's Pontifical Seminary and by the Vicar General of Madras-Mylapore Archdiocese. His remains were then carried to the clergy cemetery in the cathedral where his nephew A. J. C. Lawrence blessed the new cemetery and the remains of his uncle. He was then laid to rest there.

== Gallery ==
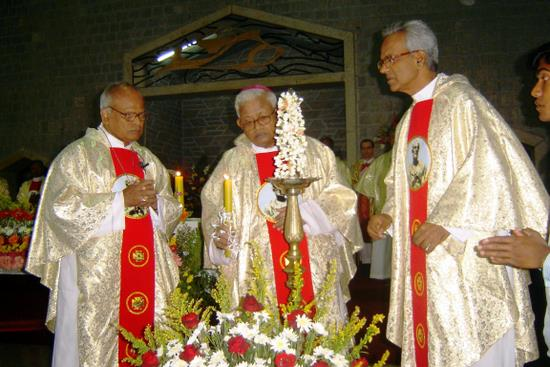
Archbishop emeritus Michael Augustine

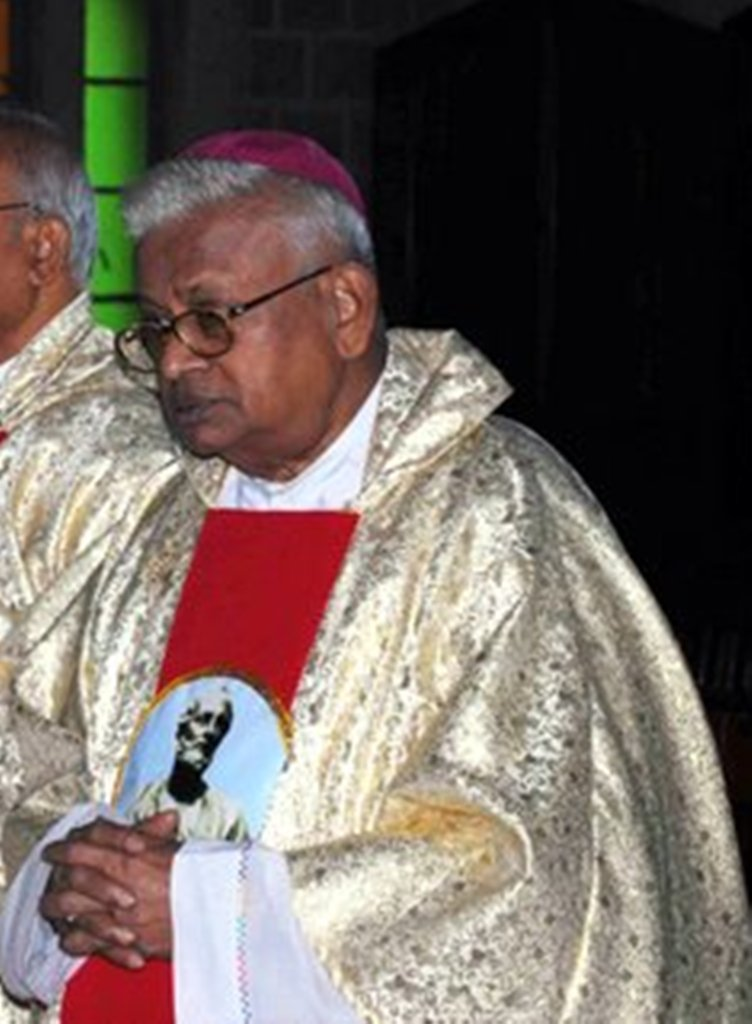
Archbishop Michael Augustine gallery

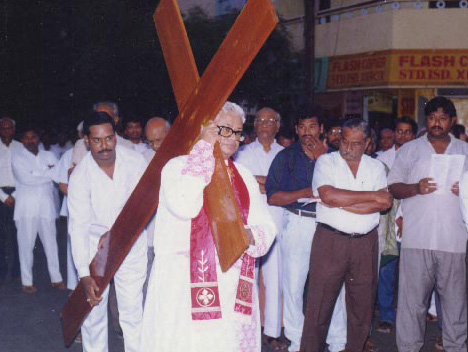
Archbishop Michael Augustine during Good Friday in way of Cross

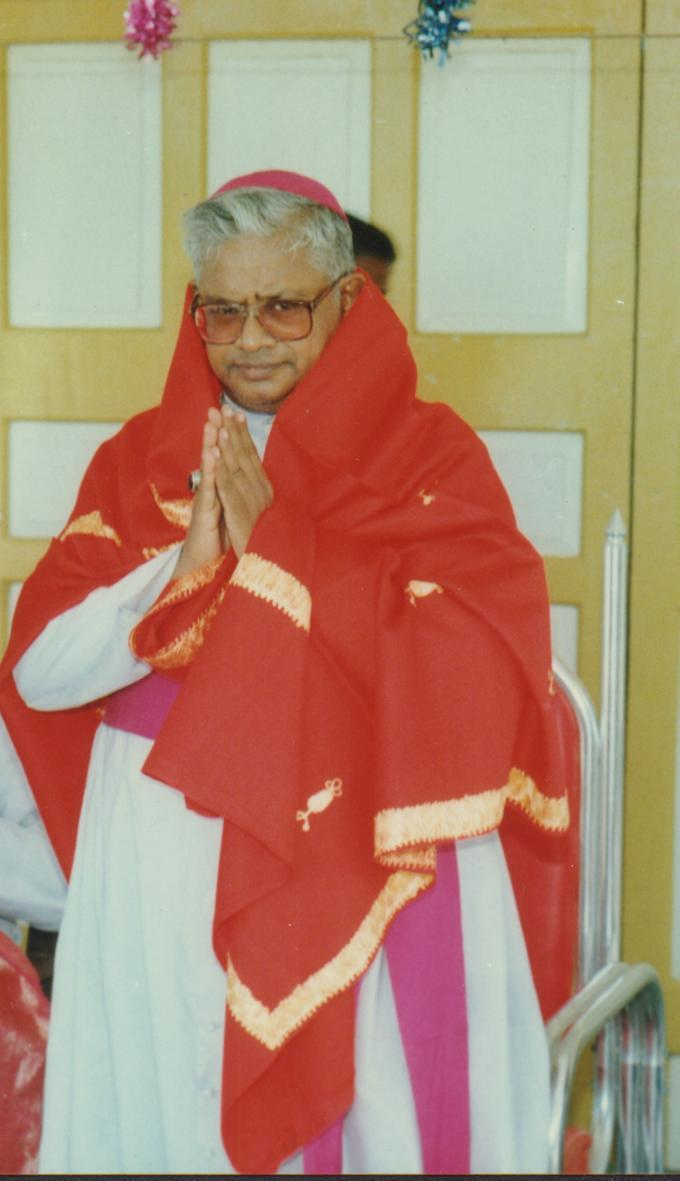
Archbishop Michael Augustine of Pondy

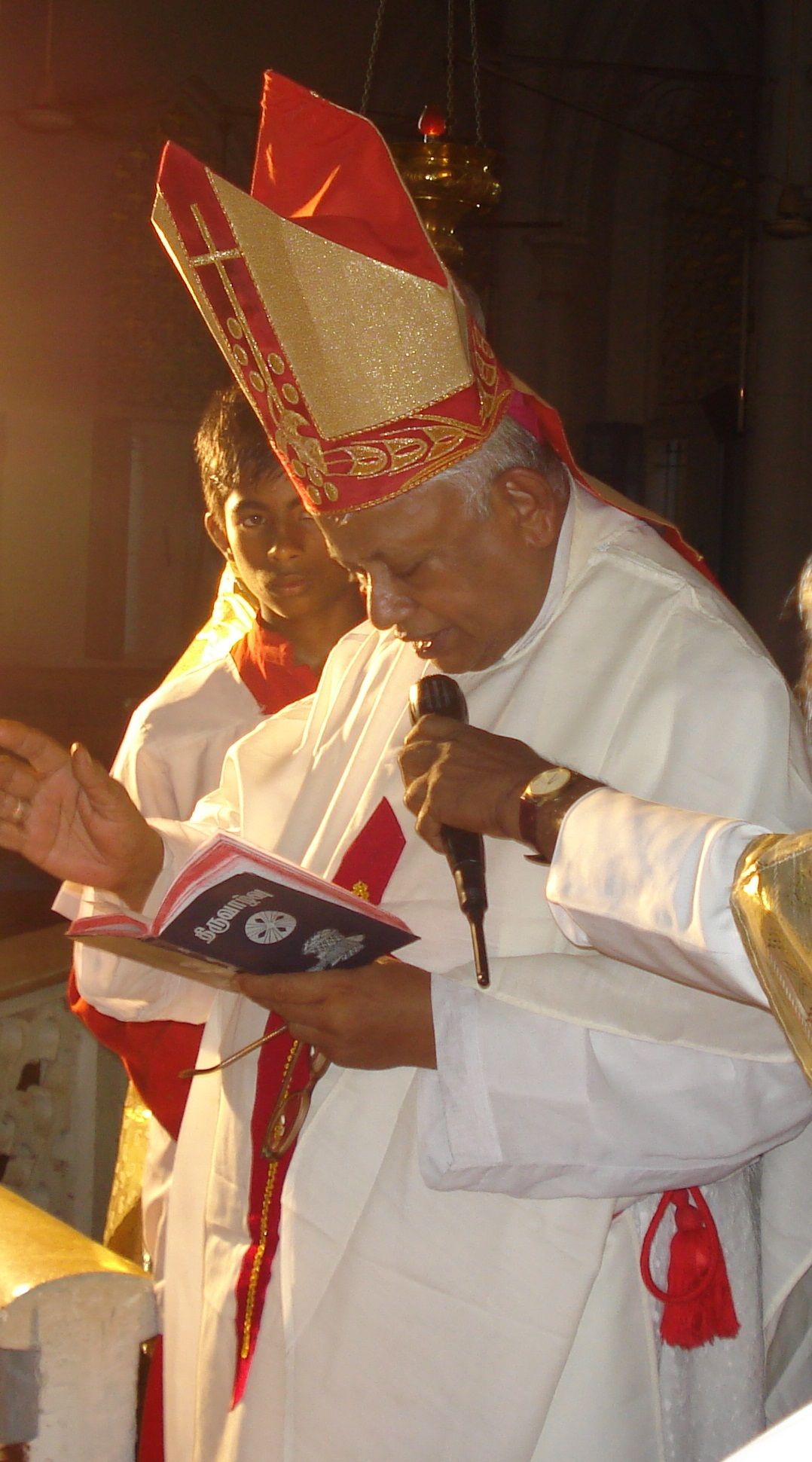
Archbishop Michael Augustine in Episcopal vestments

Catholic Church titles
Vacant Title last held by John Aelen MHM in 1901	Auxiliary Bishop of Madras and Mylapore; 30 January 1978 – 19 June 1981	Vacant Title next held by Lawrence Pius Dorairaj in 1998
Preceded by Damián Nicolau Roig	— TITULAR — Bishop of Bararus; 30 January 1978 – 19 June 1981	Succeeded by Nelson Antonio Martinez Rust
Preceded by Royappan Antony Muthu	Bishop of Vellore; 19 June 1981 – 18 February 1992	Succeeded by Malayappan Chinnappa
Preceded by Venmani S. Selvanather	Archbishop of Pondicherry and Cuddalore; 18 February 1992 – 10 June 2004	Succeeded by Antony Anandarayar
