= Chinnakudibala =

Coordinates: 12.662589°N 78.069489°E

- village
- Interactive map of Chinnakudibala
- Country: India
- State: Tamil Nadu
- District: Krishnagiri

Languages
  - Official: Tamil
- Time zone: UTC+5:30 (IST)

Chinnakudibala is a village in the Hosur taluk of Krishnagiri district, Tamil Nadu, India.
