= Hosur taluk =

Hosur Taluk
- Taluk
- Location in Tamil Nadu, India
- Coordinates: 12.73°N 77.82°E
- Country: India
- State: Tamil Nadu
- District: Krishnagiri

Population (2011)
  - Total: 539,668

Languages
  - Official: Tamil
- Time zone: UTC+5:30 (IST)
- PIN: 635 110
- Telephone code: (91)4344
- Vehicle registration: TN-70

Hosur taluka is a taluka of Krishnagiri district of the Indian state of Tamil Nadu. The headquarters is the City of Hosur. This taluk consists of 76 revenue villages.

== Demographics ==
According to the 2011 census, the taluk of Hosur had a population of 539,668 with 277,529 males and 262,139 females. There were 945 women for every 1,000 men. The taluk had a literacy rate of 67.65%. The child population in the age group below 6 years were 31,619 males and 30,142 females.

Hosur taluk has a Tamil majority population followed by a large minority of Telugus and significant Kannadigas.

== Villages in the taluk of Hosur ==
- Achettipalli
- Addakurukki
- Advanapalli
- Alasapalli
- Alnatham
- Amgondapalli
- Amuthugondapalli
- Anumepali
- Avalapalli
- Ayaranapalli
- Badathepalli
- Balagondarayanadurgam
- Baliganapalli, location of the Shanti Bhavan K-12 residential school
- Basthalapalli
- Battavarapalli
- Bedapalli
- Beerepalli
- Begepalli
- Belathur
- Berigai
- Bikkanapalli
- Boppalapuram
- Chembarasanapalli
- Chenathur
- Chennapalli
- Chinnakudibala
- Chinnakullu
- Chinnapallinayanpalayam
- Chinnarendoddi
- Collapalli
- Deripalli
- Devarekuttapalli
- Devaripalli
- Dhasapalli
- Doddagounipalli
- Elucapalli
- Eluvapalli
- Enusonai
- Errandapalli
- Gedalandhoddi
- Gopanapalli
- Gudisadanapalli
- Gudusalapalli
- Halekotta
- Hosapalli
- Ichangoor
- Idipalli
- Immidinayaganapalli
- Jeemangalam
- Jogikalasanapalli
- Kadiriganadinna
- Kagganur
- Kalasthipuram
- Kaliagraharam
- Kalingavaram
- Kallipuram
- Kamandoddi
- Kanimangalam, Krishnagiri district
- Karibasanapuram
- Karikallupalli
- Kariyasandiram
- Karupalli
- Kattinaickenghoddi
- Kelavarapalli
- Kembasandiram
- Kodiga Timmanapalli
- Koladasapuram
- Kothagondapalli
- Kottasadanapalli
- Kursthanapalli
- Machinayakanapalli
- Mathigiri Hosur cattle farm
- Nallur
- Nallur Agraharam
- Vonnalvadi

== See also ==
- Abaya Hastha Swayambu Sri Lakshmi Narasimha Swamy Temple, Agaram Village, Hosur
