= Hosapalli =

Coordinates: 12.6058945°N 78.031737°E

- village
- Interactive map of Hosapalli
- Country: India
- State: Tamil Nadu
- District: Krishnagiri

Languages
  - Official: Tamil
- Time zone: UTC+5:30 (IST)

Hosapalli is a village in the Hosur taluk of Krishnagiri district, Tamil Nadu, India.
