= Badathepalli =

Coordinates: 12.80795°N 77.89660°E

- village
- Interactive map of Badathepalli
- Country: India
- State: Tamil Nadu
- District: Krishnagiri

Languages
  - Official: Tamil
- Time zone: UTC+5:30 (IST)

Badathepalli is a village in the Hosur taluk of Krishnagiri district, Tamil Nadu, India.
