= Kagganur =

Coordinates: 12°50′59″N 77°49′17″E

- village
- Interactive map of Kagganur
- Country: India
- State: Tamil Nadu
- District: Krishnagiri

Languages
  - Official: Tamil
- Time zone: UTC+5:30 (IST)

Kagganur is a village in the Hosur taluk of Krishnagiri district, Tamil Nadu, India.
