= Devaripalli =

Coordinates: 12.86321°N 77.8964°E

Deveerapalli
- village
- Interactive map of Deveerapalli
- Country: India
- State: Tamil Nadu
- District: Krishnagiri

Languages
  - Official: Tamil, Kannada, Telugu l
- Time zone: UTC+5:30 (IST)

Devaripalli is a village in the Hosur taluk of Krishnagiri district, Tamil Nadu, India.
