= Karupalli =

Coordinates: 12°46′34″N 77°53′54″E

- village
- Interactive map of Karupalli
- Country: India
- State: Tamil Nadu
- District: Krishnagiri

Languages
  - Official: Telugu
- Time zone: UTC+5:30 (IST)

Karupalli is a village in the Hosur taluk of Krishnagiri district, Tamil Nadu, India.
