= Ichangoor =

Coordinates: 12.826609°N 77.848599°E

- Village
- Interactive map of Ichangoor
- Country: India
- State: Tamil Nadu
- District: Krishnagiri

Languages
  - Official: Tamil
- Time zone: UTC+5:30 (IST)
- PIN: 635103

Ichangoor is a village in the Hosur taluk of Krishnagiri district, Tamil Nadu, India.

== Temples ==
5 temples are located in this village.

- Mariyamma Temple
- Sree Yellama Devi Temple
- Vishnu Temple
- Kaveriyamman Temple
- Anjenayar Temple
