= Jeemangalam =

- village
- Location in Tamil Nadu, India
- Coordinates: 12°48′18.528″N 77°51′38.966″E
- Country: India
- State: Tamil Nadu
- District: Krishnagiri

Languages
  - Official: Telugu
- Time zone: UTC+5:30 (IST)
- Postal code: 635103
- Vehicle registration: TN 70

Jeemangalam is a village in the Hosur taluk of Krishnagiri district, Tamil Nadu, India. It is located at the 8th km from Hosur towards Malur.
