= Kelavarapalli =

Coordinates: 12°45′24″N 77°52′21″E

- village
- Interactive map of Kelavarapalli
- Country: India
- State: Tamil Nadu
- District: Krishnagiri

Languages
  - Official: Tamil
- Time zone: UTC+5:30 (IST)

Kelavarapalli is a village in the Hosur taluk of Krishnagiri district, Tamil Nadu, India. There is a dam across the Ponnaiyar river in this village.
