= Vinnarasi Madha Church, Gopasandiram =

Roman Catholic Church in Tamil Nadu, India

Vinnarasi Madha Church
- Our Lady Of Queen Of Heaven Church
- Vinnarasi Annai Church
- தூய விண்ணரசி அன்னை ஆலயம்
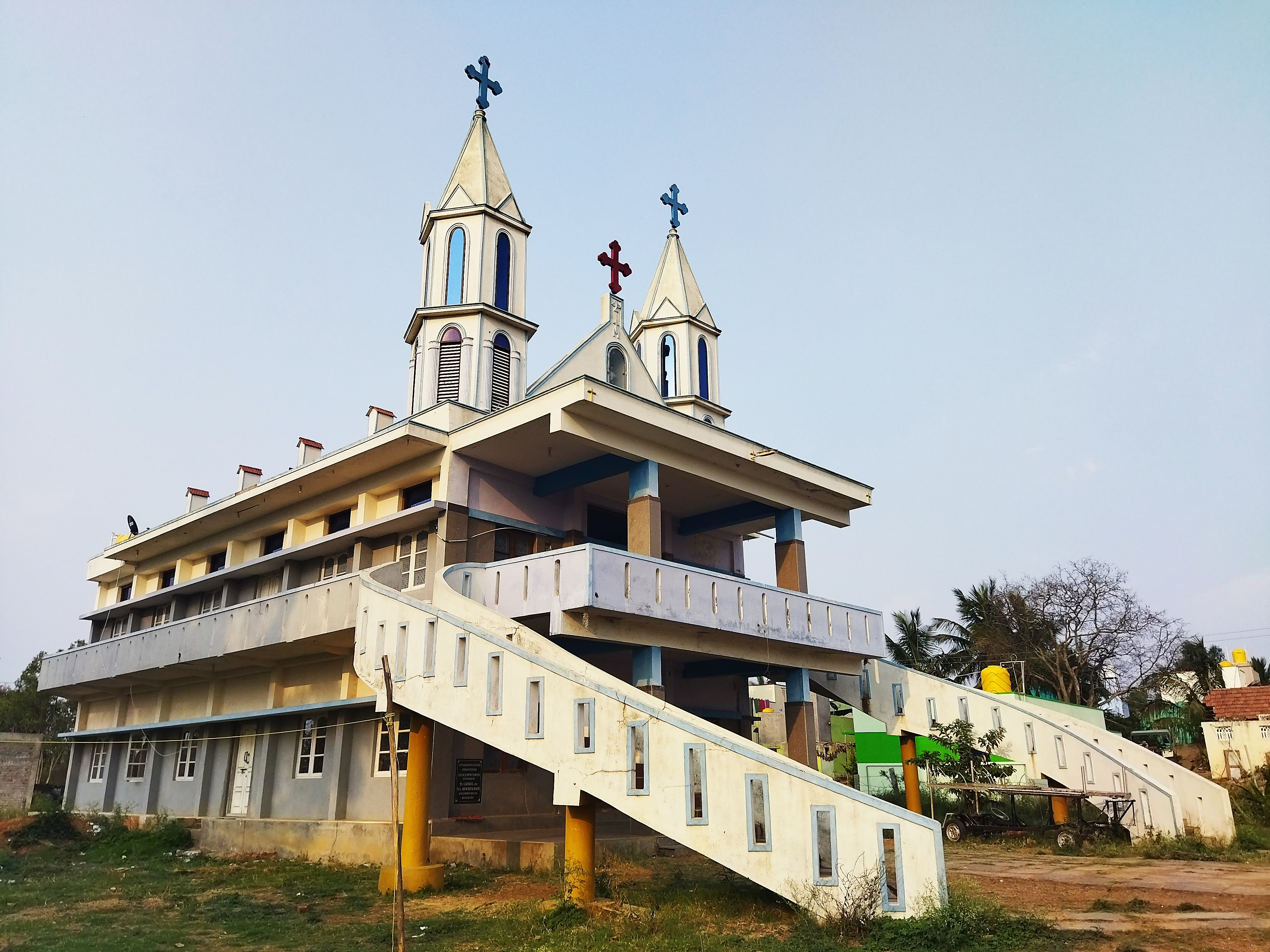
- Side view of this church
- Vinnarasi Madha Church
- 12.61663°N 77.66008°E
- Location: Gopasandiram Thally, Krishnagiri, Tamil Nadu
- Country: India
- Denomination: Catholic
- Religious order: Jesuit

History
- Status: Quasi-Parish
- Founded: 1937
- Founder: Fr. J. Arokiaswamy
- Dedication: St. Mary

Architecture
- Functional status: Active
- Architectural type: Church
- Style: Modern Architecture
- Groundbreaking: 2013
- Completed: 2014

Administration
- Archdiocese: Pondicherry and Cuddalore
- Diocese: Dharmapuri
- Deanery: Denkanikottai
- Parish: Gopasandiram

Clergy
- Archbishop: Francis Kalist
- Bishop: Lawrence Pius Dorairaj
- Priest: Fr. Mariadass

The Vinnarasi Madha Church, officially known as Our Lady of Queen of Heaven Church, is a Roman Catholic quasi-parish church located in the village of Gopasandiram. It operates under the direct administration of the Dharmapuri Diocese.

== History ==
For a long time, Christian people lived in Gopasandram village. Prayers and masses was functioning under Madagondapalli church priest. For the spiritual needs of village people, 0.65 cents of land was purchased in 1937 and a chapel was built.

During the tenure of Madagondapalli parish priest J. Arokiaswamy, the old chapel was removed, the construction work of the present church was started. The construction work was completed by Fr. S. Jesudass. Then this church consecrated and inaugurated on 13.01.2014 by Dharmapuri Bishop Lawrence Pius

Gopasandiram church, which was sub-station church of Madagondapalli Parish, on 22.08.2020 this church has been converted into a Quasi Parish then Diocese appointed Fr. Rajappa as a first mission priest for this church. Now, Fr. Bosco Madalaimuthu has taken in-charge on 06.07.2021 and is leading the Gopsandiram church as a mission priest.
