= Kamandoddi =

- village
- Interactive map of Kamandoddi
- Coordinates: 12.68441°N 77.938526°E
- Country: India
- State: Tamil Nadu
- District: Krishnagiri

Government
  - Ex Panchayat President: Chandrasekhar V

Population (2001)
  - Total: 6,500+(2,015)

Languages
  - Official: Tamil
- Time zone: UTC+5:30 (IST)

Kamandoddi is a village in the Hosur taluk of Krishnagiri district, in Tamil Nadu, India. In addition to Tamil, Kannada, Telugu is a major language in the village.
