= Eluvapalli =

Coordinates: 12.818921°N 77.979984°E

- village
- Interactive map of Eluvapalli
- Country: India
- State: Tamil Nadu
- District: Krishnagiri

Languages
  - Official: Telugu
- Time zone: UTC+5:30 (IST)
- Postal code: 635103

Eluvapalli is a village in the Hosur taluk of Krishnagiri district, Tamil Nadu, India.

There are a total of 283 families residing in this village. The village has population of 1323 of which 688 are males while 635 are females as per Population Census 2011.
