= Gudusalapalli =

Coordinates: 12°40′20″N 78°2′40″E

- village
- Interactive map of Gudusalapalli
- Country: India
- State: Tamil Nadu
- District: Krishnagiri

Languages
  - Official: Tamil
- Time zone: UTC+5:30 (IST)

Gudusalapalli is a village in the Hosur taluk of Krishnagiri district, Tamil Nadu, India.
