= Amuthugondapalli =

- village
- Interactive map of Amuthugondapalli
- Coordinates: 12.8153227°N 77.9309958°E
- Country: India
- State: Tamil Nadu
- District: Krishnagiri

Languages
  - Official: Tamil
- Time zone: UTC+5:30 (IST)

Amuthugondapalli is a village in the Hosur taluk of Krishnagiri district, Tamil Nadu, India.
