= Amgondapalli =

Coordinates: 12.7316714°N 77.9592122°E

- village
- Interactive map of Amgondapalli
- Country: India
- State: Tamil Nadu
- District: Krishnagiri

Languages
  - Official: Tamil
- Time zone: UTC+5:30 (IST)

Amgondapalli is a village in the Hosur taluk of Krishnagiri district, Tamil Nadu, India.
