= Belathur, Krishnagiri district =

Belathur
- village
- Interactive map of Belathur
- Coordinates: 12.849652°N 77.864905°E
- Country: India
- State: Tamil Nadu
- District: Krishnagiri

Government
  - Body: Government of Tamil Nadu

Languages
  - Official: Tamil
- Time zone: UTC+5:30 (IST)
- Postal code: 635124

Belathur is a village in the Hosur taluk of Krishnagiri district, Tamil Nadu, India.
