= Kothagondapalli =

Coordinates: 12°43′45″N 77°46′44″E

- village
- Interactive map of Kothagondapalli
- Country: India
- State: Tamil Nadu
- District: Krishnagiri

Languages
  - Official: Tamil
  - Spoken: Telugu
- Time zone: UTC+5:30 (IST)

Kothagondapalli is a village in the Hosur taluk of Krishnagiri district, Tamil Nadu, India.
