= Sebastianappan Singaroyan =

Indian Prelate of the Roman Catholic Church (born 1952)

The Most Reverend Sebastianappan Singaroyan
- Bishop Emeritus of Salem
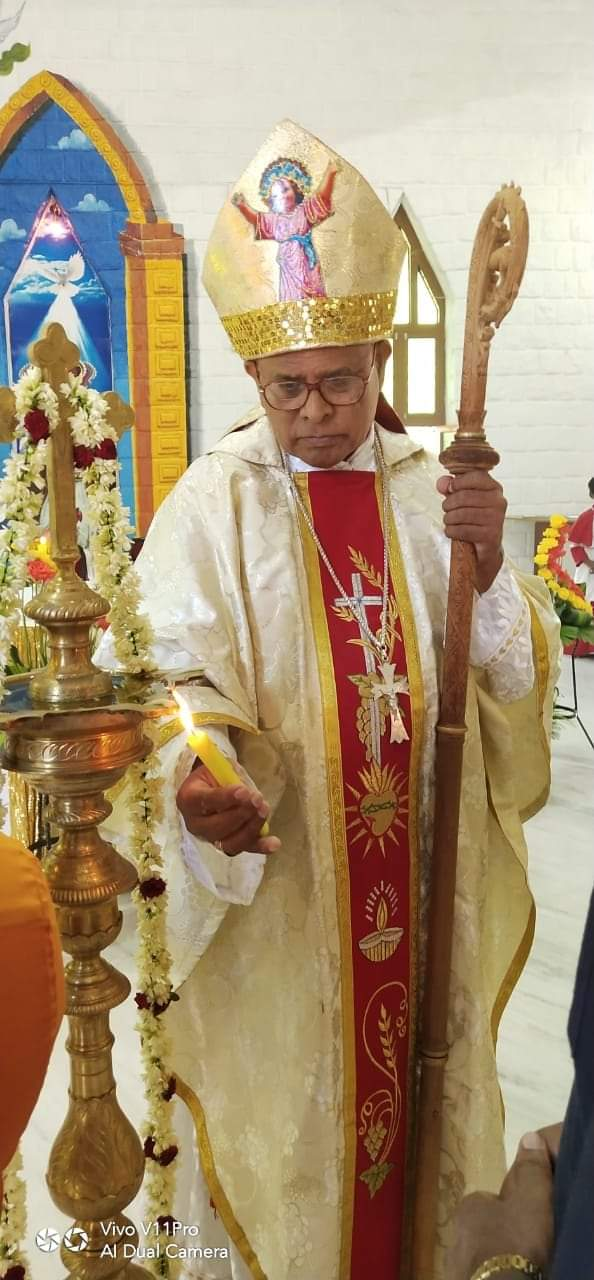
- Church: Catholic Church
- Province: Archdiocese of Pondicherry and Cuddalore
- See: Diocese of Salem
- Installed: 18 October 2000
- Term ended: 9 March 2020
- Predecessor: Michael Bosco Duraisamy
- Successor: Arulselvam Rayappan

Orders
- Ordination: 27 May 1978 by Michael Bosco Duraisamy
- Consecration: 18 October 2000 by Archbishop Michael Augustine
- Rank: Bishop Emeritus

Personal details
- Born: 13 April 1952 Elathagiri, Krishnagiri, Tamil Nadu, India
- Education: St. Peter Pontifical Seminary; Pontifical Lateran University

Styles of Sebastianappan Singaroyan
- Reference style: The Most Reverend
- Spoken style: Your Grace
- Religious style: Monsignor

Bishop Sebastianappan Singaroyan is an Indian Prelate of the Roman Catholic Church. He was the bishop of the Roman Catholic Diocese of Salem from 18 October 2000 – 9 March 2020. He was a priest for 43 years and a bishop for 21 years. He is widely known for his simplicity and is referred by the people as Bishop of the Poor, Peoples Bishop.

== Early life, education and sacerdotal ministry ==
Bishop Singaroyan was born on 18 January 1952 at Elathagiri in Krishnagiri District, Tamil Nadu. He studied philosophy and theology at St. Peter’s Pontifical Seminary, Bangalore under the rectorship of Fr. Michael Augustine (later Archbishop). He was ordained priest on 27 May 1978 for the Diocese of Salem. He took doctorate in theology from Pontifical Lateran University, Rome in 1995. He has M.A. (Tamil Language), M.A. (Public Administration), M. Sc. (Psychology) in the University of Madras. He was the professor of theology and director of pastoral ministry at Good Shepherd major seminary, Coimbatore prior to his appointment as Bishop of Salem.

== Episcopal ministry ==
Pope John Paul II appointed Fr. Singaroyan as Bishop of Salem on 5 July 2000. He received his episcopal consecration on 18 October 2000 from Archbishop Michael Augustine of Pondicherry and Cuddalore who was the Principal Consecrator and the Co-Consecrators were Archbishop James Masilamony Arul Das of Madras-Mylapore and Bishop Ambrose Mathalaimuthu of Coimbatore. He resigned as Bishop of Salem on 9 March 2020 citing health reasons at the age of 68.
