= Battavarapalli =

Coordinates: 12°50′N 77°54′E

- village
- Interactive map of Battavarapalli
- Country: India
- State: Tamil Nadu
- District: Krishnagiri
- Taluk: Hosur

Population (2001)
  - Total: 704

Languages
  - Official: Kannada And Telugu
- Time zone: UTC+5:30 (IST)
- Postal code: 635124
- Vehicle registration: TN 70
- Website: http://batavarapalli.blogspot.in/2017/10/batavarapalli_10.html?m=1

Battavarapalli is a village in the Hosur taluk of Krishnagiri district, Tamil Nadu, India.Batavarapalli village having 3 types of community (1)BC, (2)MBC, (3)SC it's means, Achari(BC), Kurubas(MBC) and Dravidians(SC). Here speaking Telugu is BC and SC, Kannada Speakers is MBC....
