= Balagondarayanadurgam =

- village
- Interactive map of Balagondarayanadurgam
- Coordinates: 12.670682°N 78.0848°E
- Country: India
- State: Tamil Nadu
- District: Krishnagiri

Languages
  - Official: Tamil
- Time zone: UTC+5:30 (IST)

Balagondarayanadurgam is a village in the Hosur taluk of Krishnagiri district, Tamil Nadu, India.
