= Kodiga Timmanapalli =

Coordinates: 12°36′32″N 78°10′36″E

Kodiga Timmanapalli Kodithimanapalli
- village
- Interactive map of Kodiga Timmanapalli
- Country: India
- State: Tamil Nadu
- District: Krishnagiri

Languages
  - Official: Tamil
- Time zone: UTC+5:30 (IST)
- Postal code: 635117

Kodiga Timmanapalli is a village in the Hosur taluk of Krishnagiri district, Tamil Nadu, India.
