= Chinnarendoddi =

Coordinates: 12.839582°N 78.06429°E

Chinnarandoddi
- village
- Interactive map of Chinnarandoddi
- Country: India
- State: Tamil Nadu
- District: Krishnagiri

Languages
  - Official: Tamil
- Time zone: UTC+5:30 (IST)

Chinnaredndoddi is a village in the Hosur taluk of Krishnagiri district, Tamil Nadu, India.
