= Boppalapuram =

Coordinates: 14°56′N 76°18′E

- village
- Interactive map of Boppalapuram
- Country: India
- State: Tamil Nadu
- District: Krishnagiri

Languages
  - Official: Tamil
- Time zone: UTC+5:30 (IST)

Boppalapuram is a village in the Hosur taluk of Krishnagiri district, Tamil Nadu, India.
