= Karibasanapuram =

Coordinates: 12°44′34″N 77°53′03″E

- village
- Interactive map of Karibasanapuram
- Country: India
- State: Tamil Nadu
- District: Krishnagiri

Languages
  - Official: Tamil
- Time zone: UTC+5:30 (IST)

Karibasanapuram is a village in the Hosur taluk of Krishnagiri district, Tamil Nadu, India.
