= Gedalandhoddi =

Coordinates: 12.836573°N 78.050459°E

Gedalandhoddi கேதலன்தொட்டி Gedalandoddi
- village
- Interactive map of Gedalandhoddi
- Country: India
- State: Tamil Nadu
- District: Krishnagiri to

Languages
  - Official: Tamil
- Time zone: UTC+5:30 (IST)

Gedalandhoddi is a village in the Hosur taluk of Krishnagiri district, Tamil Nadu, India.
