= Chinnakullu =

Coordinates: 12.751315°N 77.88050°E

Chinnakullu Chinnakollu
- village
- Interactive map of Chinnakullu
- Country: India
- State: Tamil Nadu
- District: Krishnagiri

Languages
  - Official: Tamil
- Time zone: UTC+5:30 (IST)

Chinnakullu is a village in the Hosur taluk of Krishnagiri district, Tamil Nadu, India.
