= Ayaranapalli =

Coordinates: 12.63618°N 77.95299°E

- town
- Interactive map of Ayaranapalli
- Country: India
- State: Tamil Nadu
- District: Krishnagiri

Languages
  - Official: Tamil
- Time zone: UTC+5:30 (IST)

Ayaranapalli is a village in the Hosur taluk of Krishnagiri district, Tamil Nadu, India.
