= Alasapalli =

- village
- Interactive map of Alasapalli
- Coordinates: 12.850889°N 77.904016°E
- Country: India
- State: Tamil Nadu
- District: Krishnagiri

Government
  - Body: panchayat

Languages
  - Official: Tamil Unofficial Telugu
- Time zone: UTC+5:30 (IST)

Alasapalli is a gram panchyat village in the Hosur taluk of Krishnagiri district, Tamil Nadu, India.
