= Koladasapuram =

Coordinates: 12°48′08″N 77°55′48″E

Koladasapuram Ayyappan Temple Sree Dharmasastha Trust
- village
- Interactive map of Koladasapuram
- Country: India
- State: Tamil Nadu
- District: Krishnagiri

Languages
  - Official: Tamil
- Time zone: UTC+5:30 (IST)

Koladasapuram is a village in the Hosur taluk of Krishnagiri district, Tamil Nadu, India.
