= Avalapalli =

- Village
- Location in Tamil Nadu, India
- Coordinates: 12°44′50″N 77°50′30″E
- Country: India
- State: Tamil Nadu
- District: Krishnagiri

Languages
  - Official: Tamil
- Time zone: UTC+5:30 (IST)

Avalapalli is a village in the Hosur taluk of Krishnagiri district, Tamil Nadu, India.
