= Dhasapalli =

Coordinates: 12.743034°N 77.92372°E

- village
- Interactive map of Dhasapalli
- Country: India
- State: Tamil Nadu
- District: Krishnagiri

Languages
  - Official: Tamil
- Time zone: UTC+5:30 (IST)

Dhasapalli is a village in the Hosur taluk of Krishnagiri district, Tamil Nadu, India.
