= Karikallupalli =

Coordinates: 12°49′50″N 78°02′25″E

- village
- Interactive map of Karikallupalli
- Country: India
- State: Tamil Nadu
- District: Krishnagiri

Languages
  - Official: Tamil
- Time zone: UTC+5:30 (IST)

Karikallupalli is a village in the Hosur taluk of Krishnagiri district, Tamil Nadu, India.
