= Addakurukki =

- village
- Location in Tamil Nadu, India Addakurukki (India)
- Coordinates: 12°41′4″N 77°57′6″E
- Country: India
- State: Tamil Nadu
- District: Krishnagiri

Area
  - Total: 4.03 km^{2} (1.56 sq mi)

Population (2001)
  - Total: 1,088
  - Density: 270/km^{2} (699/sq mi)

Languages
  - Official: Telugu
- Time zone: UTC+5:30 (IST)
- PIN: 635 109
- Telephone code: +91-4344

Addakurukki is a village in the Hosur taluk of Krishnagiri district, Tamil Nadu, India. There are 233 households. Nearby industries include the Gangsaw Unity of Madhucon Granites Limited which covers 25 acres of land.
