= Gudisadanapalli =

Coordinates: 12.809865°N 78.045948°E

Gudisadanapalli sahadevanapalli
- village
- Nickname: thimmaraya swamy village
- Interactive map of Gudisadanapalli
- Country: India
- State: Tamil Nadu
- District: Krishnagiri

Government
  - Panchayat President: muniyappa

Population (2001)
  - Total: 2,000

Languages
  - Official: Tamil
- Time zone: UTC+5:30 (IST)

Gudisadanapalli is a village in the Hosur taluk of Krishnagiri district, Tamil Nadu, India.
