= Bedapalli =

Coordinates: 12°40′N 78°04′E

- village
- Interactive map of Bedapalli
- Country: India
- State: Tamil Nadu
- District: Krishnagiri

Languages
  - Official: Tamil
- Time zone: UTC+5:30 (IST)

Bedapalli is a village in the Hosur taluk of Krishnagiri district, Tamil Nadu, India.
