= Kanimangalam, Krishnagiri district =

Coordinates: 12°48′33″N 77°53′00″E

Kanimangalam
- village
- Interactive map of Kanimangalam
- Country: India
- State: Tamil Nadu
- District: Krishnagiri

Languages
  - Official: Tamil
- Time zone: UTC+5:30 (IST)

sathayamanglam is a village in the Hosur taluk of Krishnagiri district, Tamil Nadu, India.
