= Alnatham =

Alnatham Alenatham
- village
- Interactive map of Alnatham
- Coordinates: 12.77208°N 77.937232°E
- Country: India
- State: Tamil Nadu
- District: Krishnagiri

Languages
  - Official: Tamil
- Time zone: UTC+5:30 (IST)

Alnatham is a village in the Hosur taluk of Krishnagiri district, Tamil Nadu, India.
