= Deripalli =

Doripalli
- village
- Country: India
- State: Tamil Nadu
- District: Krishnagiri

Government
  - Panchayat President: Dhayanandha R

Population (2001)
  - Total: 365,288

Languages
  - Official: Telugu
- Time zone: UTC+5:30 (IST)
- 635109: 635109
- Vehicle registration: TN70

Doripalli is a village in the Hosur taluk of Krishnagiri district, Tamil Nadu, India.
