= Bikkanapalli =

- Mid-sized village
- Interactive map of Bikkanapalli
- Coordinates: 12.680398°N 78.075177°E
- Country: India
- State: Tamil Nadu
- District: Krishnagiri

Government
  - Created by: Madesh Chikkegowda

Languages
  - Official: Tamil
- Time zone: UTC+5:30 (IST)
- PIN: 635107
- Vehicle registration: TN

Bikkanapalli is a village in the Hosur taluk of Krishnagiri district, Tamil Nadu, India.
