= Collapalli =

Collapalli Gollapalli
- village
- Location in Tamil Nadu, India Collapalli (India)
- Coordinates: 12.8°N 78°E
- Country: India
- State: Tamil Nadu
- District: Krishnagiri

Languages
  - Official: Tamil
- Time zone: UTC+5:30 (IST)

Collapalli is a village in the Hosur taluk of Krishnagiri district, Tamil Nadu, India. It is located the immediately east of the border separating the State of Karnataka from Tamil Nadu.
