= Errandapalli =

Coordinates: 12.652170°N 78.085141°E

Errandapalli Erandapalli
- village
- Interactive map of Errandapalli
- Country: India
- State: Tamil Nadu
- District: Krishnagiri

Languages
  - Official: Tamil
- Time zone: UTC+5:30 (IST)

Errandapalli is a village in the Hosur taluk of Krishnagiri district, Tamil Nadu, India.
