= Jogikalasanapalli =

- village
- Interactive map of Jogikalasanapalli
- Coordinates: 12.8382832°N 77.8638078°E
- Country: India
- State: Tamil Nadu
- District: Krishnagiri

Languages
  - Official: Tamil
- Time zone: UTC+5:30 (IST)

Jogikalasanapalli is a village in the Hosur taluk of Krishnagiri district, Tamil Nadu, India.
