= Enusonai =

Coordinates: 12.614735°N 78.018131°E

- village
- Interactive map of Enusonai
- Country: India
- State: Tamil Nadu
- District: Krishnagiri

Languages
  - Official: Tamil
- Time zone: UTC+5:30 (IST)

Enusonai is a village in the Hosur taluk of Krishnagiri district, Tamil Nadu, India.
