= Anumepali =

- village
- Interactive map of Anumepali
- Coordinates: 12.7756529°N 77.7852341°E
- Country: India
- State: Tamil Nadu
- District: Krishnagiri

Languages
  - Official: Telugu
- Time zone: UTC+5:30 (IST)

Anumepalli is a village in the Hosur taluk of Krishnagiri district, Tamil Nadu, India.
