= Zuzuwadi =

Zuzuvadi
- village
- Nickname: Gateway of Tamil Nadu
- Location in Tamil Nadu, India
- Coordinates: 12.768722°N 77.79234°E
- Country: India
- State: Tamil Nadu
- District: Krishnagiri

Population (2001)
  - Total: 6,338

Languages
  - Official: Tamil
- Time zone: UTC+5:30 (IST)

Zuzuvadi is a Neighborhood in Hosur, Tamil Nadu, which is roughly 30 km south of Bengaluru & 320 km west of State Capital Chennai. It is on the Bengaluru-Chennai highway near Hosur.

== Demographics ==
According to the 2001 census, Zuzuvadi had a population of 6,338, of whom 3,489 were males and 2,489 females. Zuzuvadi had a sex ratio of 1,010. Zuzuvadi had a literacy rate of 86.85.
