= Beerepalli, Hindupur mandal =

Beerepalli Guddam beerepalli
- Village
- Interactive map of Beerepalli
- Location in Andhra Pradesh, India
- Coordinates: 13.869727°N 77.566647°E
- Country: India
- State: Andhra Pradesh
- District: Sri Sathya Sai
- Named after: Reddys

Languages
  - Official: Telugu
- Time zone: UTC+5:30 (IST)
- PIN: 515331
- Vehicle registration: AP

Beerepalli is a village in Hindupur mandal, Sri Sathya Sai district of the Indian state of Andhra Pradesh. It also serves as the headquarters of M. Beerepalli panchayat.
