= Michael Bosco Duraisamy =

Indian clergyman and auxiliary bishop

- Bishop of Salem
- Church: Catholic Church
- Diocese: Diocese of Salem
- In office: 28 February 1974 – 9 June 1999
- Predecessor: Venmani S. Selvanather
- Successor: Sebastianappan Singaroyan

Orders
- Ordination: 17 December 1955
- Consecration: 10 June 1974 by John Krol

Personal details
- Born: 29 April 1929 Gingee, South Arcot District, Presidency of Fort St. George, British Raj, British Empire
- Died: 9 June 1999 (aged 70)

Michael Bosco Duraisamy (born 29 April 1929, Aachen — died 9 June 1999) was an Indian prelate and third bishop of the Roman Catholic Diocese of Salem. He was ordained as a priest in the year 1955. He was appointed as bishop of Salem in the year 1974. He died in office in 1999 at age 70.
