= Arulselvam Rayappan =

Indian prelate

Right Reverend Arulselvam Rayappan
- Bishop of Salem
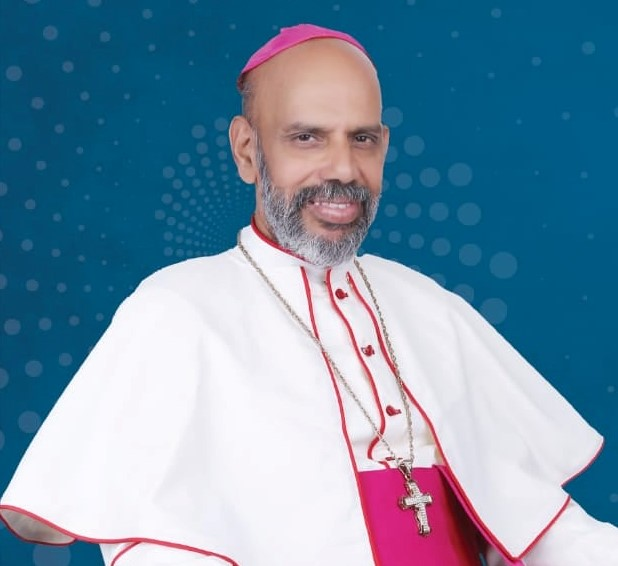
- Archdiocese: Pondicherry and Cuddalore
- Diocese: Salem
- Appointed: 31 May 2021
- Installed: 04 August 2021
- Predecessor: Bishop Sebastianappan Singaroyan

Orders
- Ordination: 20 May 1986
- Consecration: 04 August 2021 by Archbishop Antony Pappusamy

Personal details
- Born: 18 November 1960 (age 65) Sathipattu, Tamil Nadu, India
- Denomination: Roman Catholic
- Education: Pontifical Urban University
- Motto: "Audire Illum" meaning "To listen to Him"
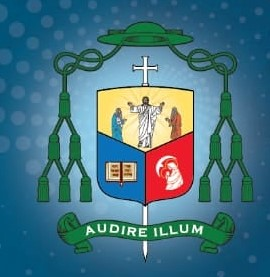
- Coat of arms

Arulselvam "Roy" Rayappan is an Indian prelate of the Catholic Church. He serves as the Bishop of the Roman Catholic Diocese of Salem.

== Early life and education ==
Arulselvam was born on 18 November 1960 in Tamil Nadu, India. He received his bachelor's degree in philosophy from Arul Anandar College, Karumathur. He has acquired a master's degree in canon law from St. Peter's Pontifical Seminary. He also obtained Doctorate in Canon Law with Summa Cum Laude from the Pontifical Urban University Rome.

== Priesthood ==
On 20 May 1986, Arul received his priestly ordination.

== Episcopate ==
Rayappan was appointed bishop of the Roman Catholic Diocese of Salem on 31 May 2021 by Pope Francis. He was consecrated as a bishop on 4 August 2021 and took possession of the Diocese of Salem on the same day. He was consecrated as a bishop by Archbishop Antony Pappusamy of Madurai who served as the Principal Consecrator and Bishop Emeritus Sebastianappan Singaroyan of Salem and Bishop Lawrence Pius of Dharmapuri served as Co-Consecrators.
