= Gopasandiram, Thally =

Gopasandiram கோபசந்திரம் Gobasandiram
- Village
- Gopasandira
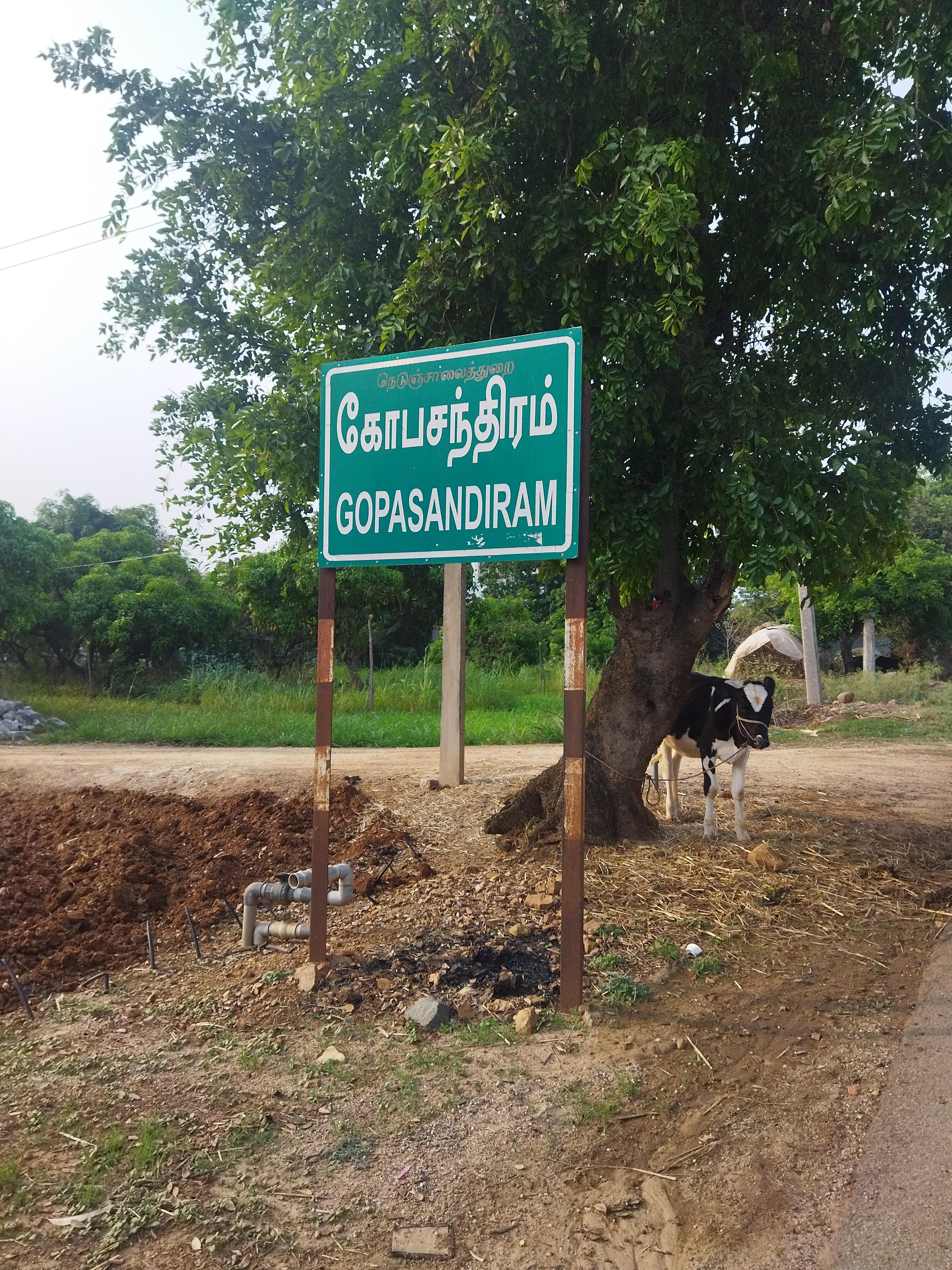

- Location of this village in its state map
- Coordinates: 12.6163°N 77.6603°E
- Country: India
- State: Tamil Nadu
- Region: Kongu Nadu
- District: Krishnagiri
- Thaluk: Denkanikottai
- Block: Thally
- Panchayat: Kottamadugu

Languages
  - Official: Tamil
  - Secondary: Kannada
- Time zone: UTC+5:30 (IST)
- PIN: 635118
- Telephone code: 91-4347
- Vehicle registration: TN 70
- Lok Sabha Constituency: Krishnagiri
- Lok Sabha Member: A. Chellakumar
- Assembly Constituency: Thalli
- Assembly Member: T. Ramachandran

Gobasandiram is a small village in Thally Block in Krishnagiri District of Tamil Nadu State, India. It comes under Kottamadugu Panchayat. This village located near border of the Tamil Nadu and Karnataka State, so the Tamil and Kannada are the common languages around this village. The nearby main village is Thally, which is 7 km away.

== See also ==
- Denkanikottai taluk
- Thally
- Vinnarasi Madha Church, Gopasandiram
