= Chennathur =

Coordinates: 12.702710°N 77.86085°E

- village
- Interactive map of Chennathur
- Country: India
- State: Tamil Nadu
- District: Krishnagiri

Languages
  - Official: Tamil
- Time zone: UTC+5:30 (IST)

Chennathur is a village in the Hosur taluk of Krishnagiri district, Tamil Nadu, India.
