= Devarekuttapalli =

Coordinates: 12.634573°N 78.065009°E

- village
- Interactive map of Devarekuttapalli
- Country: India
- State: Tamil Nadu
- District: Krishnagiri

Languages
  - Official: Tamil
- Time zone: UTC+5:30 (IST)

Devarekuttapalli is a village in the shoolagiri taluk of Krishnagiri district, Tamil Nadu, India.
