= Onnalvadi =

Village in Tamil Nadu, India

Onnalvadi ஒன்னல்வாடி Onalvadi
- Village
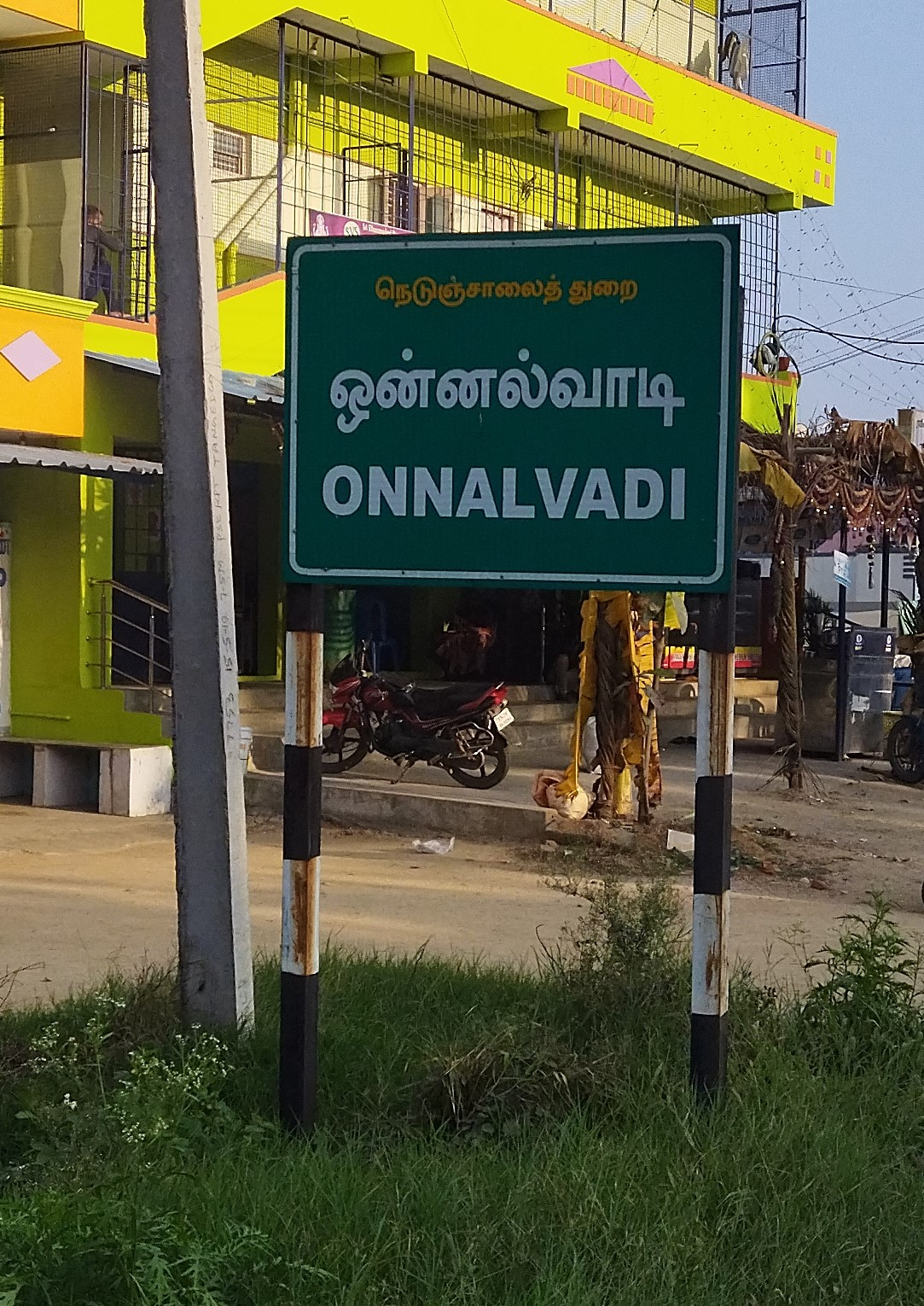
- Road Side Sign Board display this village name

- Location within Tamil Nadu
- Coordinates: 12.6836°N 77.8603°E
- Country: India
- State: Tamil Nadu
- Region: Kongu Nadu
- District: Krishnagiri
- Thaluk: Hosur
- Block: Hosur
- Panchayat: Onnalvadi

Population (2011)
  - Total: 6,656

Languages
  - Official: Tamil
  - Secondary: Kannada
- Time zone: UTC+5:30 (IST)
- PIN: 635109
- Telephone code: 91-4347
- Vehicle registration: TN 70
- Lok Sabha Constituency: Krishnagiri
- Lok Sabha Member: A. Chellakumar
- Assembly Constituency: Hosur
- Assembly Member: P. Balakrishna Reddy

Onnalvadi is Grama Panchyath village in Krishnagiri District, Tamil Nadu, India. And this village located 9 km away from its Taluk capital Hosur and 50 km away from its District capital Krishnagiri.
