= Achettipalli =

- village
- Location in Tamil Nadu, India Achettipalli (India)
- Coordinates: 12°40′30″N 77°49′35″E
- Country: India
- State: Tamil Nadu
- District: Krishnagiri

Languages
  - Official: Tamil
- Time zone: UTC+5:30 (IST)

Achettipalli is a village in the Hosur taluk of Krishnagiri district, Tamil Nadu, India.
