= Diocese of Salem =

Latin Catholic diocese in India

Coordinates: 11°39′48.599″N 78°9′43.238″E

Diocese of Salem Dioecesis Salemensis சேலம் மறைமாவட்டம்
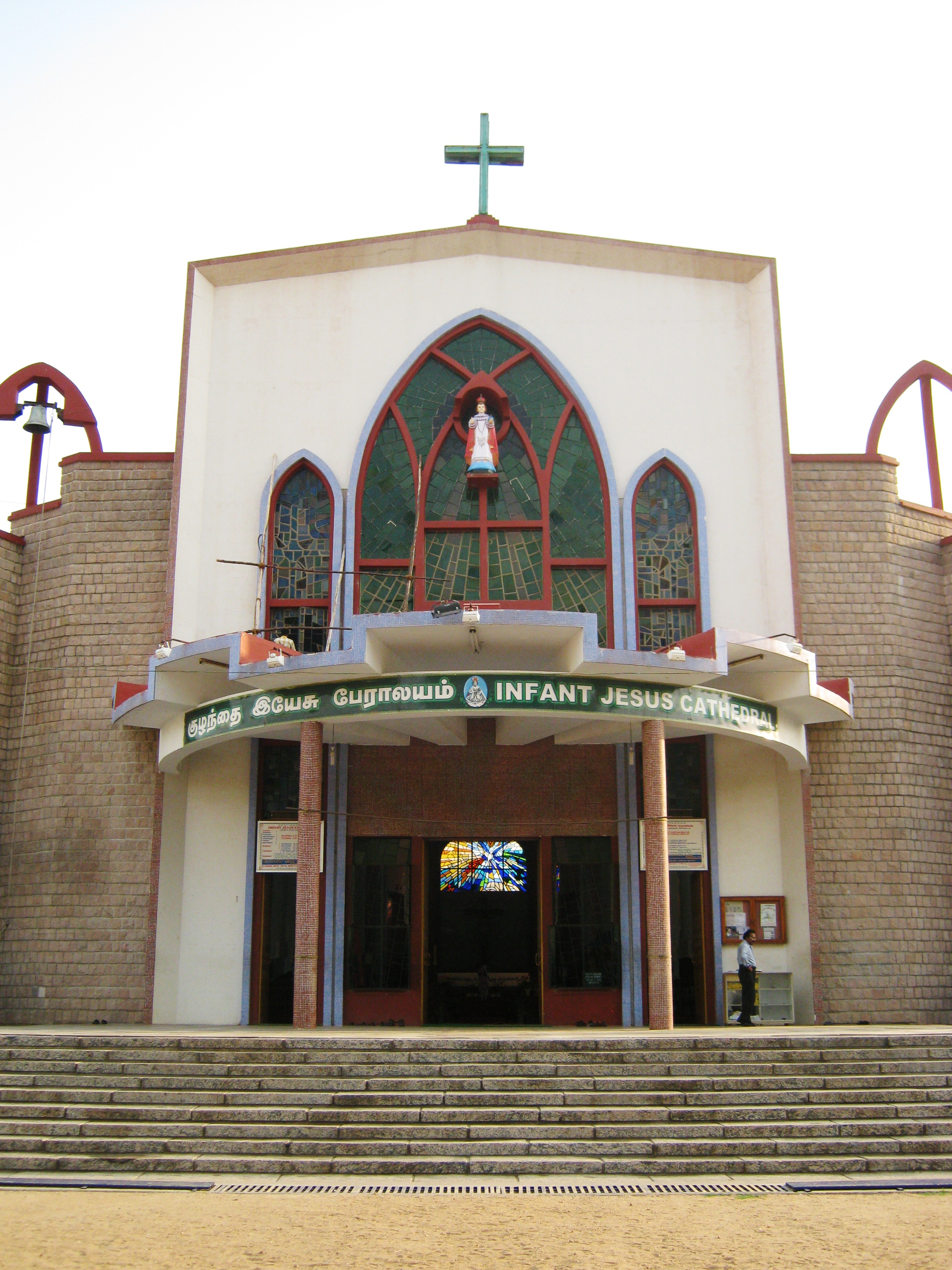

Location
- Country: India
- Ecclesiastical province: Pondicherry and Cuddalore

Statistics
- Area: 8,368 km^{2} (3,231 sq mi)
- Population: Total; Catholics: (as of 2010); 5,687,860; 88,576 (1.6%)
- Parishes: 56

Information
- Denomination: Catholic Church
- Sui iuris church: Latin Church
- Rite: Latin Rite
- Cathedral: Cathedral of the Infant Jesus in Salem, Tamil Nadu
- Co-cathedral: St Mary’s Co-Cathedral, Shevapet
- Patron saint: Infant Jesus

Current leadership
- Pope: Leo XIV
- Bishop: Arulselvam Rayappan
- Vicar General: Michael Raj Selvam
- Bishops emeritus: Sebastianappan Singaroyan

Website
- Website of the Diocese

The Diocese of Salem (Latin: Salemen(sis)) is a Latin Church ecclesiastical jurisdiction or diocese of the Catholic Church in India. Its episcopal see is Salem. The Diocese of Salem is a suffragan in the ecclesiastical province of the metropolitan Archdiocese of Pondicherry and Cuddalore.

== History ==
=== Madura Mission ===
The foundation of Madura mission had a tremendous effect on the social history of Salem. Robert de Nobili (1577–1656), an eminent and dedicated Jesuit was the first missionary who visited Salem to spread Christianity and founded Catholic Church there. He entered the Jesuit order in 1595 and came to India in 1604. He reached Madurai in 1606 when it was ruled by Tirumalai Nayak (1623-1659). Nobily adopted the mode of life of Hindu sanyasis in order to attract higher caste Hindus to Christianity by his adoptive method he converted many Hindu high caste into Christian faith. As a result of his novel way of conversion, Christianity was accepted in the southern parts of Tamil Nadu by low caste and high caste people. After founding a well-known Jesuit mission at Madurai in 1606 AD, he decided to spread the gospel in the neighbouring regions.

He established congregations wherever conversion took place in large numbers. In 1623, he toured through many parts of Tamil Country. During the course of the tour he visited Truchirapalli, Senthamangalam and Salem. In June 1623, he arrived at Senthamangalam, the capital of Ramachandra Nayak, the Vasal of Thirumala Nakak of Madurai. Nayak offered him a site to build a church and a presbytery but after consulting God in prayer, Robert de Nobili declined the offer.

At Salem, Nobili met Tirumangala Nayak, the elder brother of Ramachandra Nayak and also the dethroned ruler of Senthamangalam. Fr. Nobili followed Tirumangala, a small town in Dharampuri and baptized him there along with his family members on 25 December 1625.

On 31 July 1626, Nobili received the visit of a Saivist Pandaram and a man belonging to Valluvar caste. The latter one was impressed by De Nobili's Tamil book, Sign of True Religion, and was himself baptized with the name "Mukthi Udayan" ("Blissful One"). His conversion had a tremendous impact on the evangelical service rendered by Fr. Nobili in Salem region. Very soon Maramangalam became an important Christian centre with 40 neophytes. As this centre was then well established he could leave for other places to continue to preach the gospel. So he invited Fr. Martins and put him in charge of Salem, Maramangalam and Senthamangalam which numbered between 100 and 150 Christians.

In 1627, he left for Tiruchirapalli. The little congregations he established grew from strength to strength. Due to the efforts of Fr. De Nobili and Fr. Antonio Vico, a church was built at Maramangalam in 1628 and another one at Salem. Subsequently, the Christian Mission centre was established in various places in Salem region Fr. Nobili established a mission centre in Dharamapuri. By 1665, there were a large number of Catholics at Kongupatti, Ilupuli, Anaikarapalayam, Omalur, Sankagiri, Anthiyur, Mathiyampatti and Ilanagar.

=== Establishment of diocese ===
On 26 May 1930 the Diocese of Salem was erected from the parts of Salem District and from the Diocese of Kumbakonam, Diocese of Mysore and Archdiocese of Pondicherry.

== Cathedrals ==
St. Mary's Co-Cathedral was consecrated in 1975 as 'The Pro Cathedral of Our Lady of Victories' by Bishop Michael Bosco Duraisamy. The parish of Arisipalayam was bifurcated from Shevapet in 1953 and was erected as St. Francis Xavier's parish. The chapel of St. Francis Xavier's Minor Seminary served as the parish church till 1991. The new Infant Jesus Cathedral was consecrated on 27 November 1991, and dedicated to Infant Jesus. This Cathedral was planned and constructed with strenuous efforts by late Bishop Most Rev. Dr. Michael B. Duraisamy.

== Leadership ==
- Bishop Henri-Aimé-Anatole Prunier, M.E.P. (26 May 1930 – 20 November 1947; Resigned)
- Bishop Venmani S. Selvanather (3 March 1949 – 17 March 1973; promoted as Archbishop of Pondicherry and Cuddalore) (Clergy of Salem Diocese)
- Bishop Michael Bosco Duraisamy (28 February 1974 – 9 June 1999; Died in Office) (Clergy of Pondicherry Archdiocese)
- Bishop Sebastianappan Singaroyan (18 October 2000 – 9 March 2020; Resigned) (Clergy of Salem Diocese)
- Bishop Lawrence Pius Dorairaj, Apostolic Administrator of Salem (9 March 2020 - 4 August 2021) (Clergy of Madras-Mylapore and Bishop of Dharmapuri)
- Bishop Arulselvam Rayappan (4 August 2021 - Incumbent) (Clergy of Pondicherry Archdiocese)

== Gallery ==
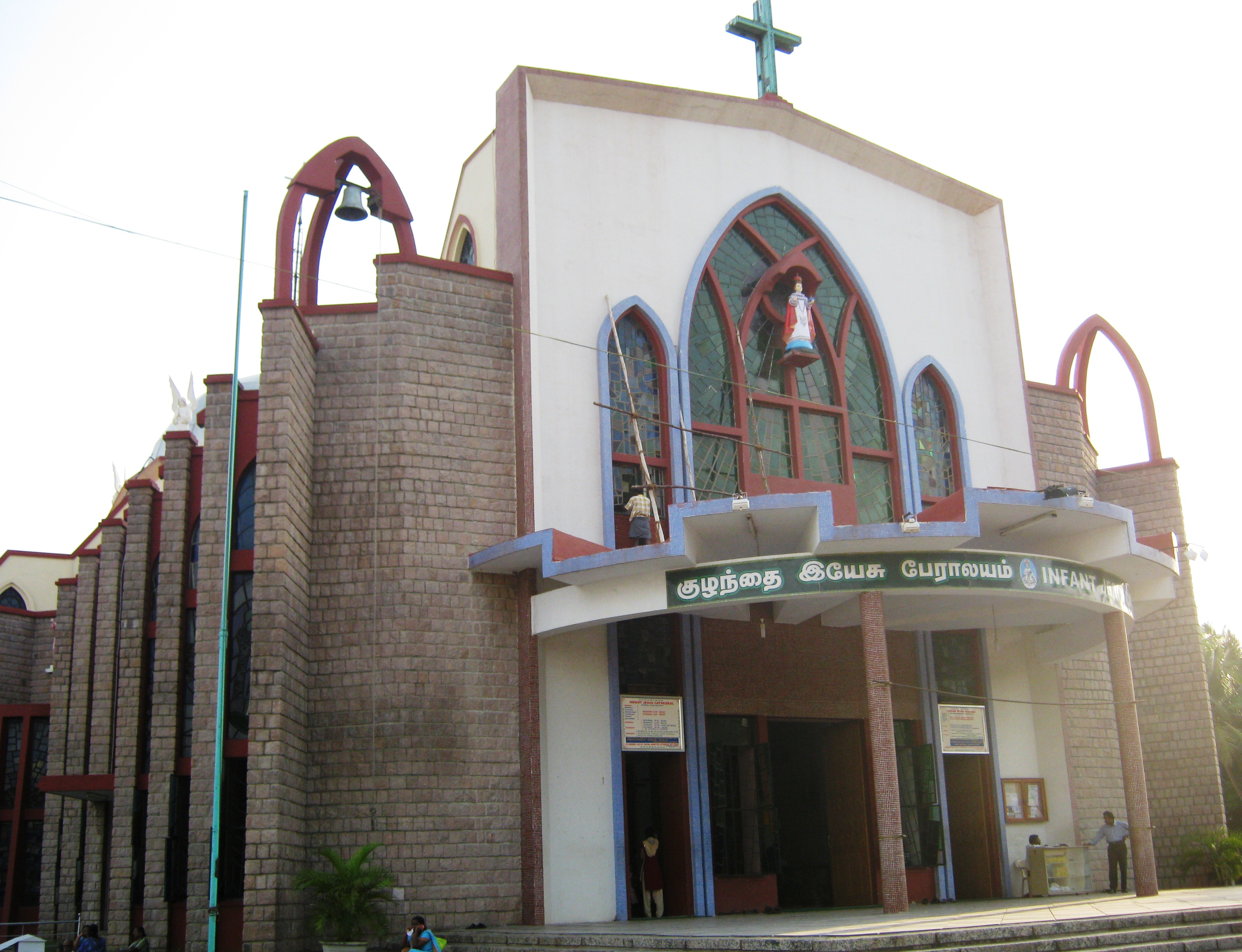
Infant Jesus Cathedral

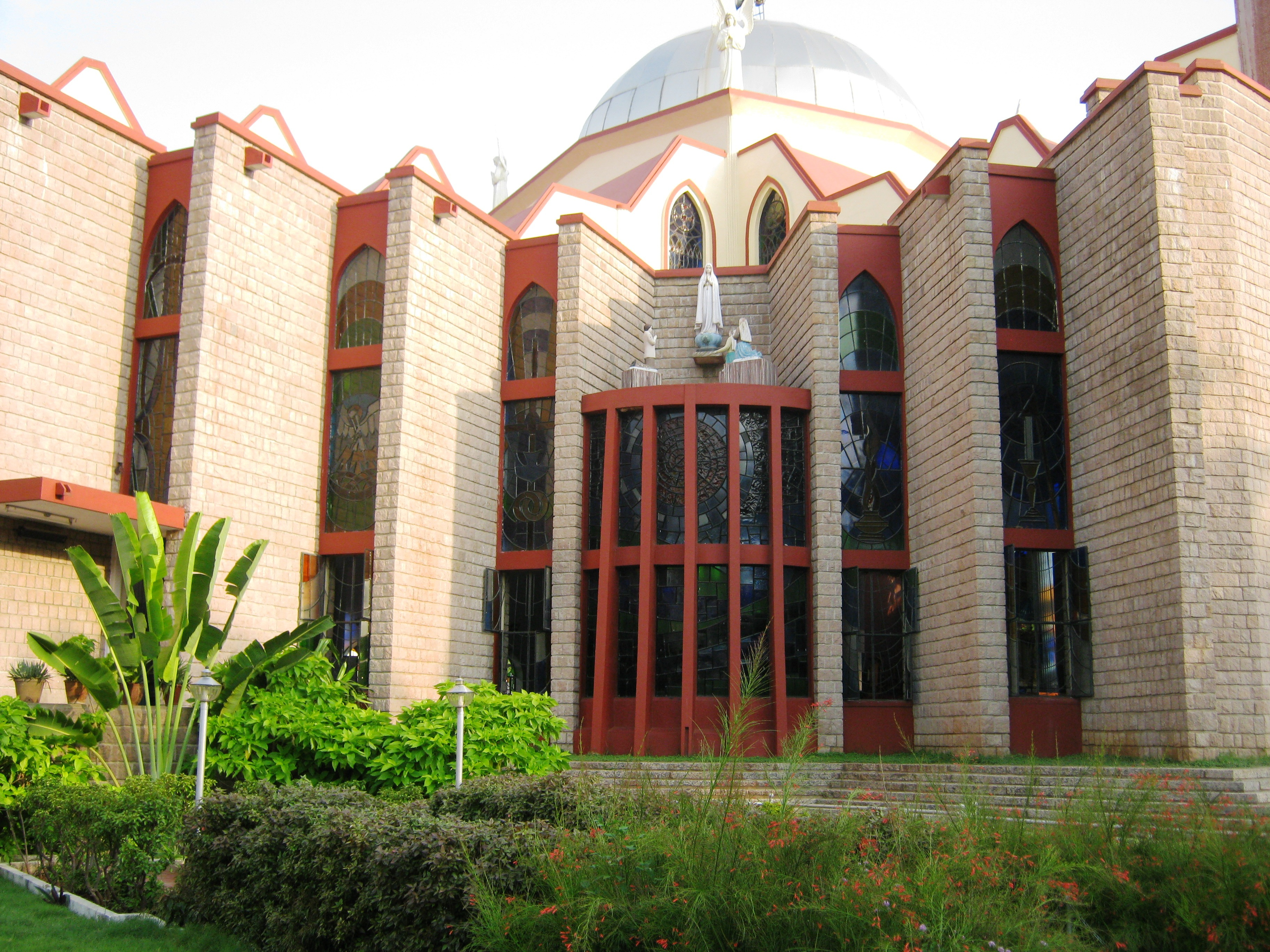
Infant Jesus Cathedral

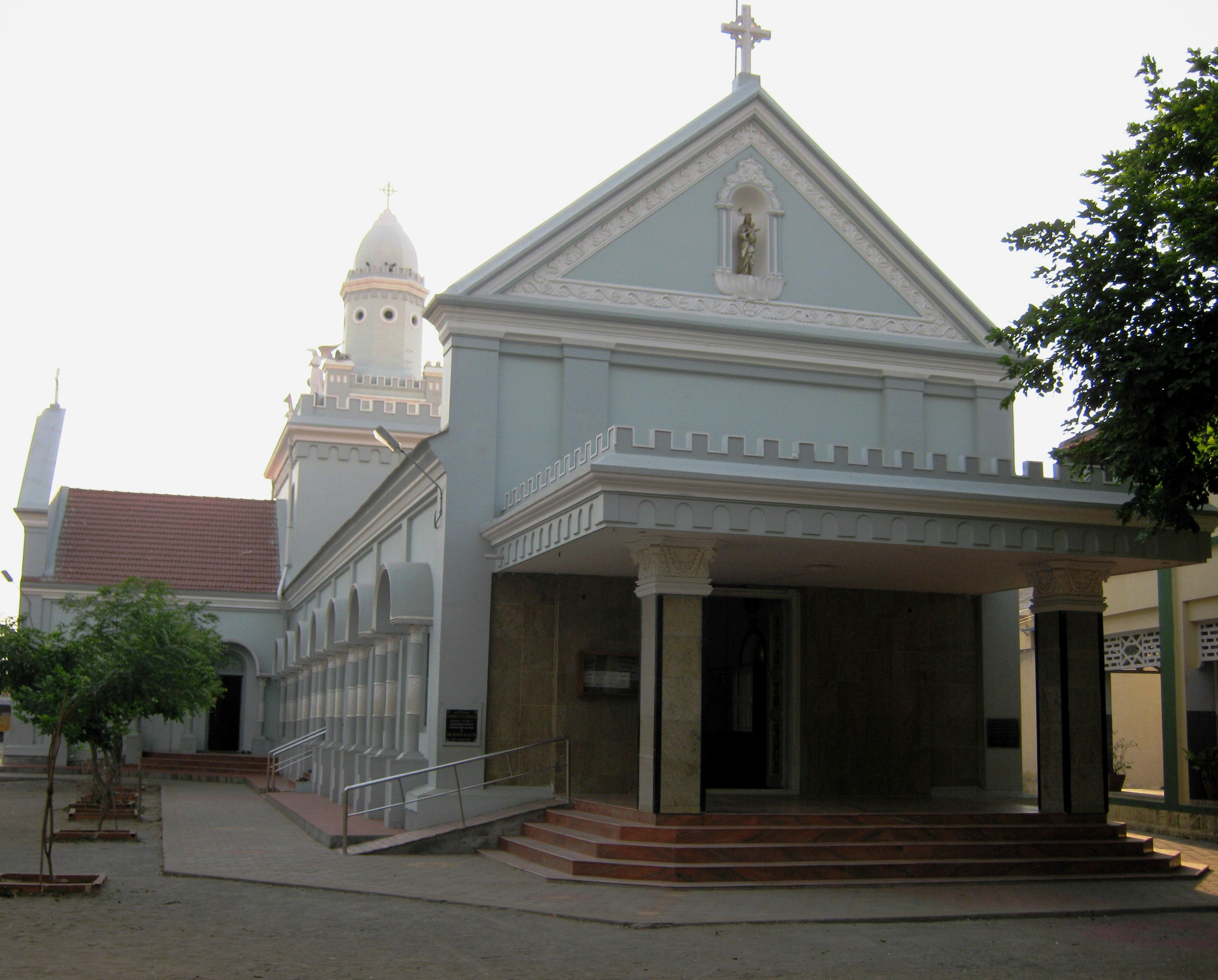
St. Mary's Co-Cathedral

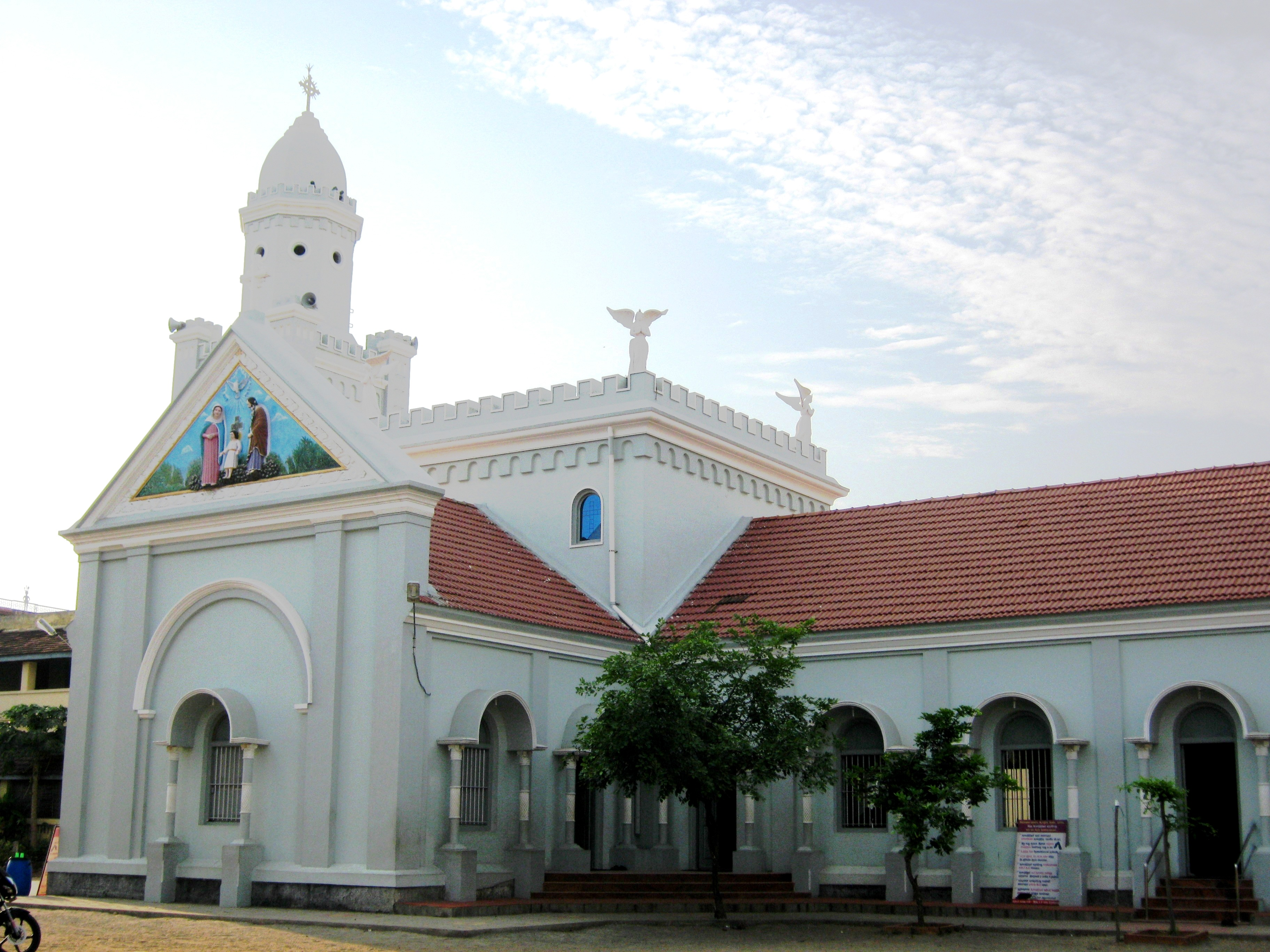
St. Mary's Co-Cathedral

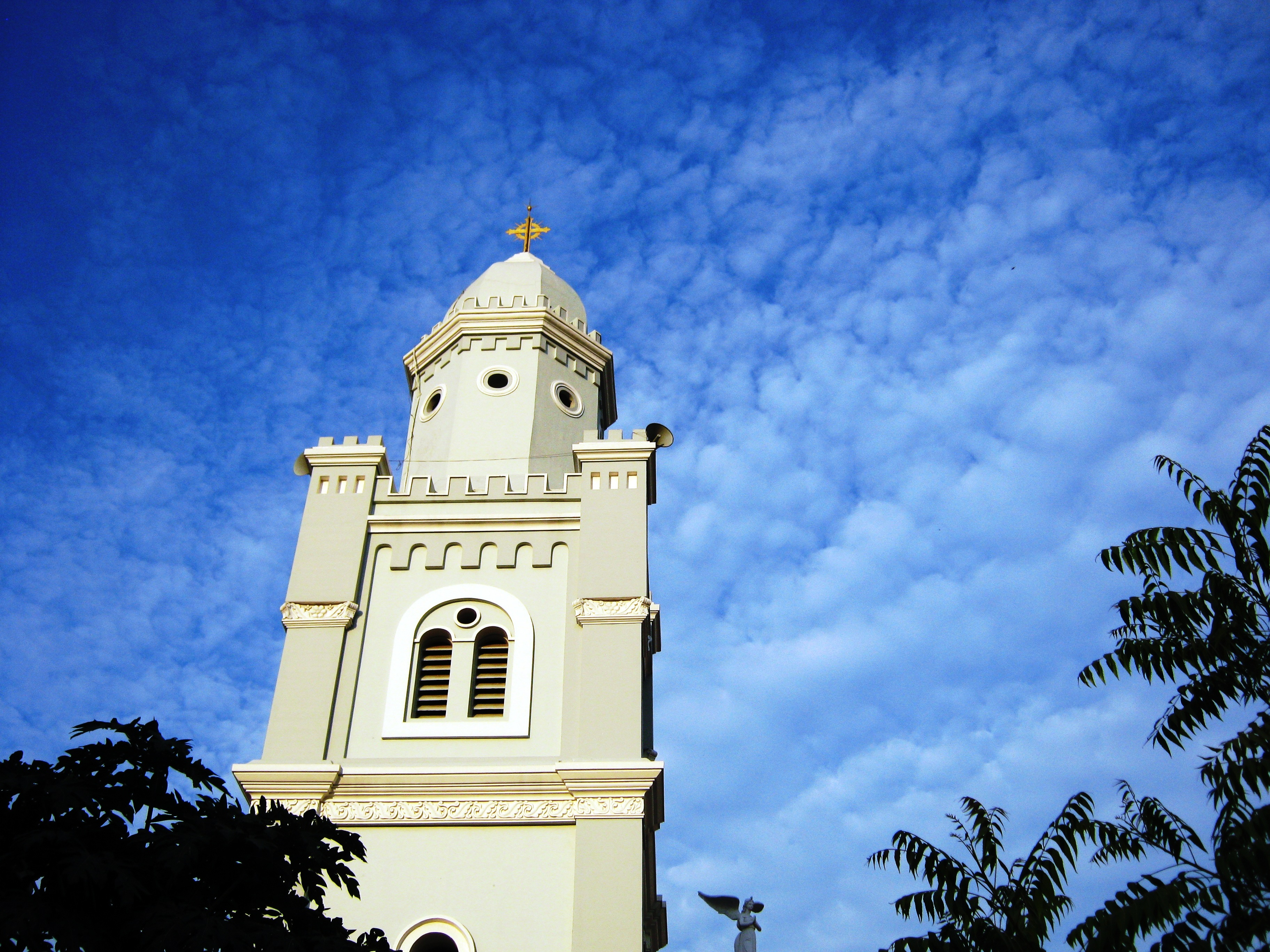
St. Mary's Co-Cathedral
