= Venmani S. Selvanather =

Indian prelate (1913-1993)

Archbishop Venmani S. Selvanather
- Archbishop Emeritus of Pondicherry and Cuddalore
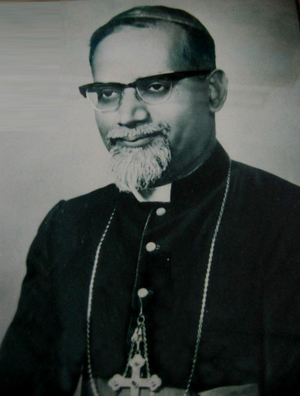
- See: Pondicherry and Cuddalore
- Appointed: 17 March 1973
- Term ended: 18 February 1992
- Predecessor: Ambrose Rayappan
- Successor: Michael Augustine

Orders
- Ordination: 26 October 1941
- Consecration: 1 May 1949 by Henri-Aimé-Anatole Prunier

Personal details
- Born: Venmani S. Selvanather; 6 July 1913 Tiruchengode
- Died: 14 October 1993 (aged 80)
- Buried: Cathedral Cemetery, Pondicherry
- Denomination: Catholic
- Motto: Caritas Christi Urget Nos (Christ's love compels us – 2 Cor 5:14)
- Coat of arms: Venmani S. Selvanather's coat of arms

Venmani S. Selvanather (6 July 1913 – 14 October 1993) was an Indian prelate of the Roman Catholic Church. He was the Archbishop of the Archdiocese of Pondicherry and Cuddalore from 1973 to 1992, succeeding Ambrose Rayappan. He founded several initiatives in the educational and social service field.

== Career ==
Selvanather was born at Tiruchengode, Tamil Nadu. He was ordained as a priest for the Diocese of Salem on 26 October 1941. He was appointed Bishop of Salem on 3 March 1949. He was consecrated by Bishop Henri-Aimé-Anatole Prunier on 1 May 1949. He was the Bishop of Salem from 1949 to 1973 and participated in Second Vatican Council as a Council Father. He was appointed as Archbishop in 1973, retiring on 24 June 1992. He was succeeded by Archbishop Michael Augustine as Archbishop of Pondicherry and Cuddalore. He died on 14 October 1993.

== Archbishop ==
As Archbishop, Selvanather was responsible for the establishment of Pondicherry Multipurpose Social Service Society (PMSSS) and South Arcot Multipurpose Social Service Society (SAMSSS). He started St.Joseph's College of Arts & Science and St.John's College Seminary at Cuddalore. He also started Pope John Paul II College of Education at Pondicherry.

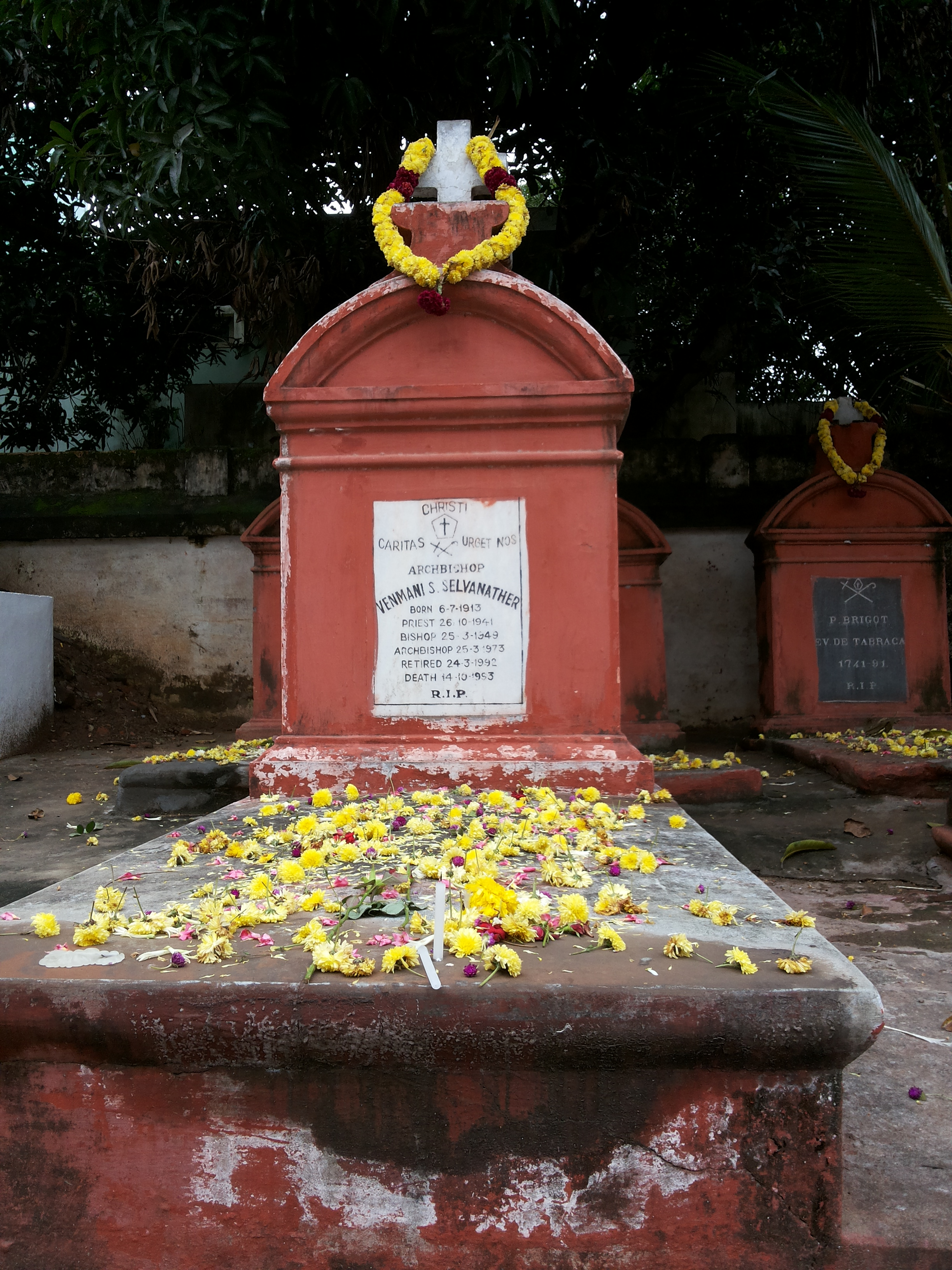
Tomb of Mgr. Venmani S. Selvanather

Styles of Venmani S. Selvanather
- Reference style: The Most Reverend
- Spoken style: Your Excellency
- Religious style: Monsignor

Ordination history of Venmani S. Selvanather
History
Episcopal consecration
- Principal consecrator: Henri-Aimé-Anatole Prunier
- Co-consecrators: Peter Francis Rayappa Joseph Mark Gopu

Catholic Church titles
Preceded by Henri-Aimé-Anatole Prunier, M.E.P.	Bishop of Salem; 3 March 1949 – 17 March 1973	Succeeded by Michael Bosco Duraisamy
Preceded by Ambrose Rayappan	Archbishop of Pondicherry and Cuddalore; 17 March 1973 – 18 February 1992	Succeeded by Michael Augustine
