= Franciscan Servants of Mary =

Roman Catholic order

- Franciscaines servantes de Marie
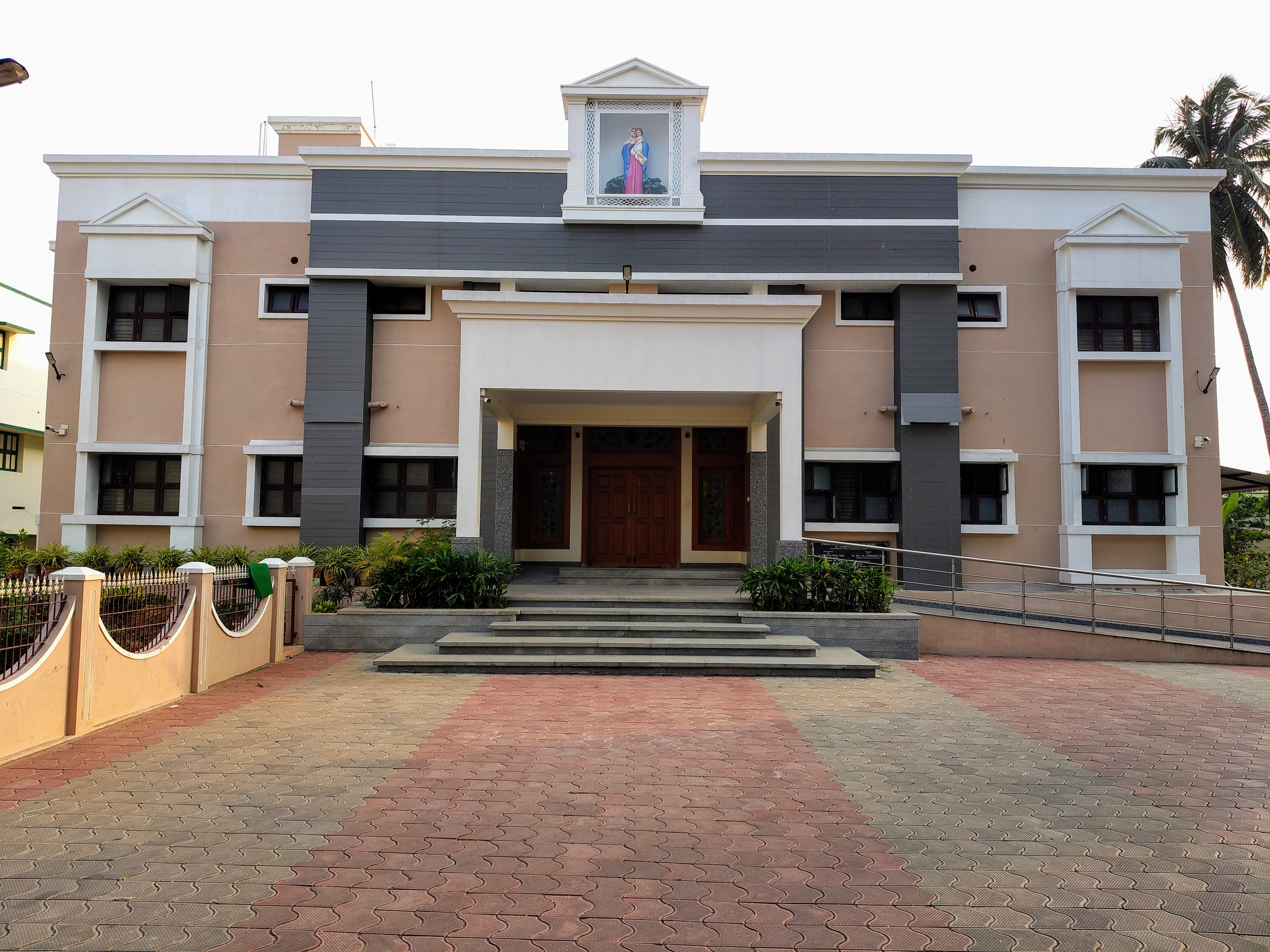
- St.Claire's Convent in Krishnagiri, TN, India
- Abbreviation: FSM
- Nickname: FSM Sisters
- Formation: 1852; 174 years ago
- Founder: Marie Virginie Vaslin
- Founded at: Blois, France
- Merger of: Franciscaines de l'Immaculée Conception of Champfleur
- Type: Catholic religious order
- Professional title: Sister, Mother
- Headquarters: Blois, France
- Members: 466 (2017)
- Superior General: Sr. Reetha Paul
- Parent organization: Franciscans
- Website: https://www.fsmsisters.org.in

The Franciscan Servants of Mary (French: Franciscaines servantes de Marie, post-nominal initials F.S.M.) is a Catholic religious institute of women of pontifical right. They live according to the Franciscan spirituality, and are engaged in educational and hospital-works.

== History ==
The institute was founded on 10 October 1852 in Blois, France by Marie Virginie Vaslin (1820-1873) who began a ministry of assistance towards domestic servants in Blois, creating a home to receive women without work, ill or elderly. On 25 March 1856 (the Feast of the Annunciation) Marie Virginie and a companion Émélie Crosnier pronounced their religious vows and received the religious habit from Louis-Théophile Pallu du Parc, Bishop of Blois. On 17 September 1864 the community adopted the Rule of the Third Order Regular of Saint Francis, together with constitutions drafted by the Capuchin Ambroise de Bergerac; at that time the institute officially took the name Franciscan Servants of Mary and the founder assumed the name Mother Marie Sainte-Claire. The institute received papal approval (Pontifical right) on 17 December 1901 and was formally aggregated to the Capuchin Friars Minor on 28 June 1926. The definitive approval of its constitutions by the Holy See was granted 30 May 1957. The cause of beatification of its founder was opened in 2013.

== Merger ==
In 1966 the congregation of the Franciscaines de l'Immaculée Conception (founded 1836 at Champfleur, Sarthe by Abbé Fouchet) merged into the Franciscan Servants of Mary.

== Activities ==
The Sisters of the congregation devote themselves to a variety of ministries, supporting women in domestic work, educating underprivileged students, and providing medical care through hospitals and clinics. They also care for orphans and children in need while offering pastoral guidance to local churches. By 2017, the congregation included 466 nuns spread across 74 convents.

== Provinces ==
The Generalate remains in Blois, France.

They are present in:

- Europe:
  - France
  - Italy
  - England
- Africa
  - Madagascar
  - Chad
- Asia
  - India
    - Bangalore Province
    - Varanasi Province

== See also ==
- Catholic religious institute
- Franciscan spirituality
