= Mathigiri =

Neighborhood in Hosur Corporation, Tamil Nadu, India

- Neighborhood
- Location in Tamil Nadu, India
- Coordinates: 12.6833°N 77.8167°E
- Country: India
- State: Tamil Nadu
- District: Krishnagiri
- Elevation: 895 m (2,936 ft)

Population (2001)
  - Total: 8,049

Languages
  - Official: Tamil
- Time zone: UTC+5:30 (IST)
- PIN: 635110
- Vehicle registration: TN-70

Mathigiri is a neighborhood in Hosur in Krishnagiri district in the Indian state of Tamil Nadu.

== Demographics ==
As of the 2001 census of India, Mathigiri had a population of 8,049. Males constituted 51% of the population and females 49%. Mathigiri has an average literacy rate of 71%, higher than the national average of 59.5%. Average male literacy rate is 76%, while average female literacy rate is 65%. 14% of the population is under 6. Mathigiri merged with Hosur Corporation in 2015.
