= Diocese of Dharmapuri =

Catholic diocese in Tamil Nadu, India

Coordinates: 12°6′54.224″N 78°9′33.309″E

Diocese of Dharmapuri Dioecesis Dharmapuriensis தர்மாபுரி மறைமாவட்டம்

Catholic
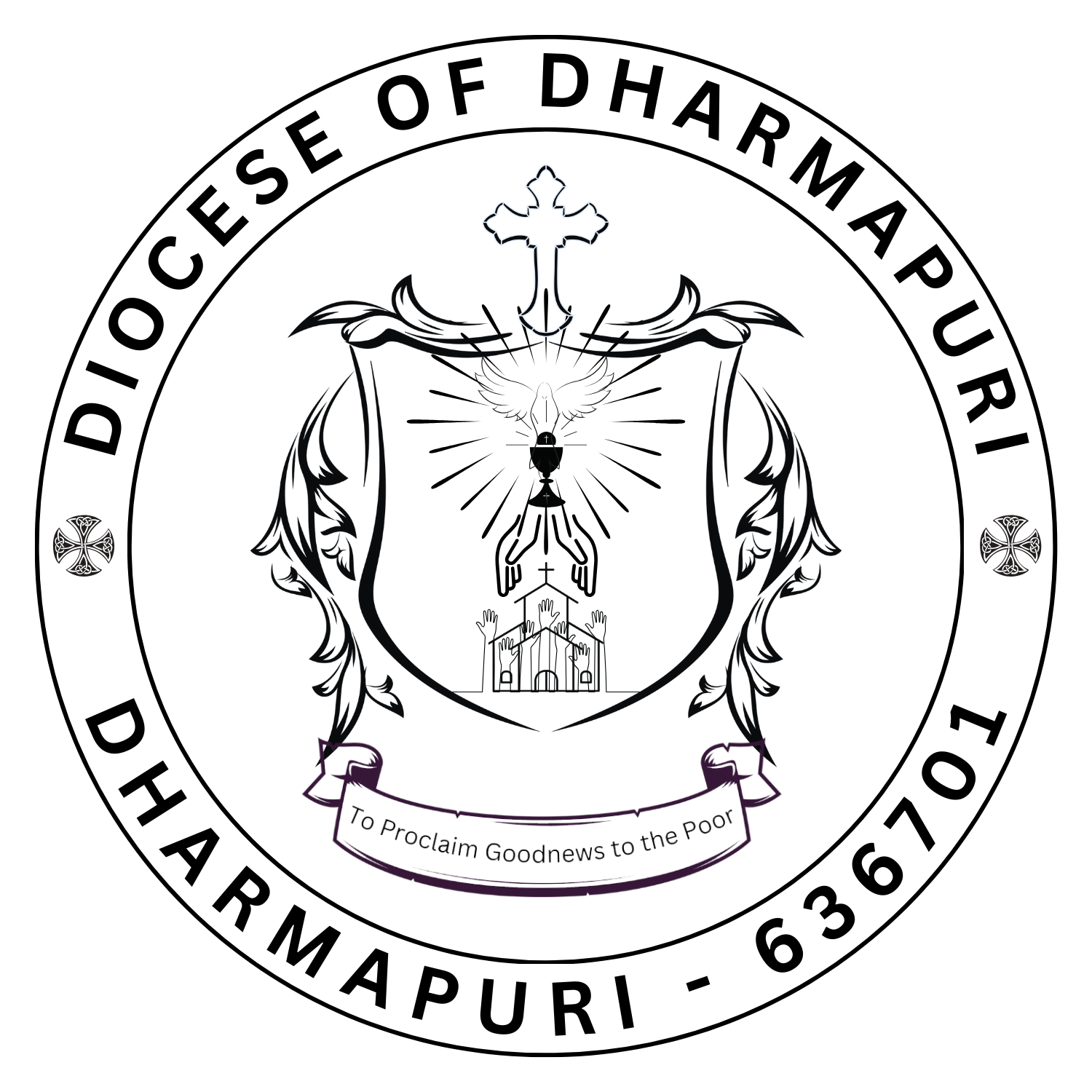
- Coat of arms

Location
- Country: India
- Ecclesiastical province: Pondicherry and Cuddalore
- Metropolitan: Pondicherry and Cuddalore
- Deaneries: 5

Statistics
- Area: 9,641 km^{2} (3,722 sq mi)
- Population: Total; Catholics: (as of 2023); 3,450,894 (Note: Annuario Pontificio (2023) via Catholic-Hierarchy.org); 56,162 (1.6%)
- Parishes: 48
- Churches: 57

Information
- Denomination: Catholic Church
- Sui iuris church: Latin Church
- Rite: Roman Rite
- Established: 1997
- Cathedral: Sacred Heart Cathedral, Dharmapuri
- Secular priests: 121
- Language: Tamil

Current leadership
- Pope: Leo XIV
- Bishop: Lawrence Pius Dorairaj
- Metropolitan Archbishop: Francis Kalist
- Vicar General: A. Ambrose

Website
- dharmapuridiocese.in

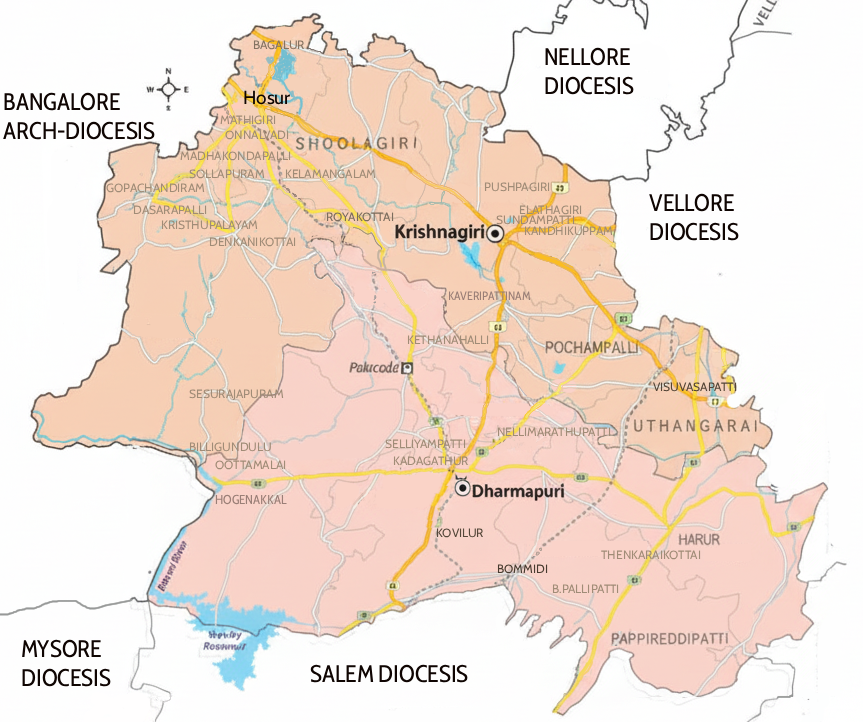
Map of Diocese of Dharmapuri and its Parish churches

The Diocese of Dharmapuri (Latin: Dharmapurien(sis)) is a Latin diocese of the Catholic Church located in the city of Dharmapuri, India, in the ecclesiastical province of Pondicherry and Cuddalore. The diocese administers to the political region of Dharmapuri district and Krishnagiri district.

== History ==
The history of the Dharmapuri Diocese is closely linked to that of the Diocese of Salem, from which it was separated from 24 January 1997. Christianity was introduced to the Salem Diocese in 1623 by Jesuit Robert De Nobili, followed by the Portuguese Jesuits of Madurai Missions. In 1654, Italian Jesuits from Mysore established their residence in Dharmapuri and began preaching the Gospel in the region, extending as far as Tirupattur in North Arcord.

In 1674, John de Britto visited Dharmapuri on his way to Kolei, accompanied by Fr. Antony Ribero. In 1687, the church's work started to spread in the present districts of Salem and Dharmapuri. Despite the suppression of the Jesuits under the Pombal decree, they continued their mission under the jurisdiction of Cranganore.

In 1776, the Pope entrusted the Madurai Missions and the Malabar Missions to the MEP Fathers. In 1785, Chapenois, MEP Superior of the Malabar Mission, was given the responsibility by Rome to oversee the entire Mysore Mission, which included the old Diocese of Salem. In 1794, he became the first bishop to visit the Diocese of Salem and appointed Abbe Dubois to carry out the church's work.

Until 1930, this region remained under the administration of the Coramandal Missions and later the Apostolic Vicariate of Pondicherry, which became an archdiocese in 1886. However, Hosur Taluk was entrusted to the care of the Mysore Missions from 1861. On 3 August 1930, the Diocese of Salem was established.

Due to the vastness of the Diocese of Salem, the district of Dharmapuri was separated and declared a diocese by Pope John Paul II on 24 January 1997. Joseph Anthony Irudayaraj, a Salesian, was appointed as its first bishop. After 15 years of ministry, Irudayaraj retired on 13 January 2012, due to his advanced age. Lawrence Pius became the second bishop and was installed in the See of Dharmapuri on 20 February 2012. Under his leadership and the motto "To Proclaim the Good News to the Poor," the diocese has witnessed ongoing development in various fields. The Dharmapuri Diocese is the 15th diocese in the Tamil Nadu region.

== Leadership ==
- Bishops of Dharmapuri (Latin Rite)
  - Joseph Anthony Irudayaraj (24 January 1997 – 13 January 2012)
  - Lawrence Pius Dorairaj (since 13 January 2012)

== Parishes ==
This diocese has 45 Parish, which are bifurcated under 5 Vicariates

± = also Vicariate parish

Parish	Established	Parish church	Sub-station church / Chapel
Adaikalapuram	1962	St. Mary's Church	
Averipally	2022	Our Lady of the Rosary Church	
B.Pallipatti	1930	Our Lady of Mount Carmel	Our Lady of Lourdes Church, B.Pallipatti
Bagalur	1999	Mary Help of Christians Church	
Bargur - Kottur	1999	St. Antony's Church	
Biligundu	2009	St. Antony's Church	
Bommidi	1955	St. Antony's Church	Periyanayagi Annai Church, Kalaignar Nagar
Christhupalayam	1932	Immaculate Conception Church	
Dasarapalli	1953	Christ the King Church	
Dasarapalli	1953	Christ the King Church	St. Antony's Church, Dasarapalli X Road
Dasarapalli	1953	Christ the King Church	St. Antony's Church, Thalikothanur
Denkanikottai ±	1973	Little Flower Church	St. Joseph Church, AVS, Denkanikottai
Dharmapuri ±	1968	Sacred Heart Cathedral	
Dhinnur	2023	St. Paul the Hermit Church	
Elathagiri	1901	Our Lady of Refuge Church	
Elathagiri	1901	Our Lady of Refuge Church	Holy Family Church (Paarai Kovil)
Elathagiri	1901	Our Lady of Refuge Church	Infant Jesus Chapel, Kulandhai Yesu Nagar
Elathagiri	1901	Our Lady of Refuge Church	Periyanayagi Church, J.C. Pudur
Elathagiri	1901	Our Lady of Refuge Church	Poondi Madha Church, Rayapanoor
Elathagiri	1901	Our Lady of Refuge Church	Sagayamadha Church, Sagayapuram
Gopasandiram	2020	Queen of Heaven Church	
Harur ±	1973	Sacred Heart Church	St. Antony's Church, Nadiyanur
Hogenakkal-Ootamalai	2002	Our Lady of the Falls Church	
Hosur ±	1979	Sacred Heart Church	
Hosur - Divine Nagar	2013	St. Therese of the Child Jesus	
Hosur - Sipcot	2000	Our Lady of Lourdes Church	St. Joseph, the worker Church, Dharga
Kadagathur	1910	St. Mary's Church	
Kadagathur	1910	St. Mary's Church	Our Lady of Refuge Church, K.N.Savulur
Kadagathur	1910	St. Mary's Church	St. Teresa of Baby Jesus Church, Kollagathur
Kandikuppam	1979	Queen of Heaven Church	
Kandikuppam	1979	Queen of Heaven Church	Infant Jesus Church, Achamangalam
Kandikuppam	1979	Queen of Heaven Church	Our Lady of Refugee Chapel, Kamaraj Nagar
Kandikuppam	1979	Queen of Heaven Church	Velankanni Arokiya Madha Chapel, Kockanoor
Kandikuppam	1979	Queen of Heaven Church	Vannathu Andoniyar Church, Thandavanpallam
Kathanpallam	2018	St. Joseph Church	
Kaveripattinam	2009	Our Lady of Peace Church	
Kembathpalli	2023	St. Xavier Church	
Kelamangalam	1996	Sacred Heart Church	
Kethanahalli	2000	St. Francis Xavier's Church	Our Lady of Good Health Church, Thumbalahalli Dam
Kovilur	1856	St. Xavier's Church	
Kovilur	1856	St. Xavier's Church	St. Antony's Church, Chittoor
Kovilur	1856	St. Xavier's Church	Immaculate Heart of Mary Church, Kottampatti
Kovilur	1856	St. Xavier's Church	St. Ignatius Of Loyala Church, Narthampatti
Krishnagiri ±	1930	Our Lady of Fatima Shrine	
Krishnagiri ±	1930	Our Lady of Fatima Shrine	St. Ignatius Of Loyala Church, Oldpet
Krishnagiri ±	1930	Our Lady of Fatima Shrine	St. Joseph Church, Periyarikodi
Krishnagiri ±	1930	Our Lady of Fatima Shrine	Sacred Heart Church, V.Madepalli
Mathagondapalli	1930	Sacred Heart Church	
Mathigiri	1926	Our Lady of Good Health Church	Our Lady of Good Health Heritage Church, Kudhraipalayam
Nellimarathupatti	2010	Our Lady of Mt. Carmel	
Onnalvadi	2002	Our Lady of Help Church	Our Lady of Velankanni Church, Chennathur
Palacode	1985	Christ the King Church	Our Lady of Assumption Church, Kesarkuli Dam
Pappireddipatti	2002	Our Lady of Velankanni Church	
Pochampalli	2025	Annai Velankanni Madha Church	
Poolapatti	2010	St. Sebastian's Church	
Pushpagiri	2015	St. Therese of the Child Jesus	Our Lady of Garland of Flowers, Madha Malai
Rayakottai	1999	Our Lady of Lourdes Church	Our Lady of Good Health Church, Panjampalli
Selliampatti	2016	Infant Jesus Church	
Selliampatti	2016	Infant Jesus Church	St. Mary Magdalene Church, Gollapatti
Selliampatti	2016	Infant Jesus Church	St. Francis Xavier Church, Selliampatti
Selliampatti	2016	Infant Jesus Church	St. Joseph Church, Valan Nagar
Selliampatti	2016	Infant Jesus Church	St. Antony's Church, Anthoniyar Nagar
Savadiyur	2025	Our Lady of Good Health Church	
Sesurajapuram	1979	John de Britto Church	Our Lady of Good Health Church, Arokiapuram
Shoolagiri	2005	Our Lady of Velankanni Church	St. Antony Church, Kamaraj Nagar
Sollepuram	2014	Our Lady of Lourdes Church	St. Antony Church, Balagiri
Sundampatti	1988	St. Anthony of Padua Church	Vanathu Chinnapar Church, Soorankottai
Thenkaraikottai	1952	Our Lady of Mount Carmel Church	
Uthangarai	1982	St. Antony's Church	
Veppampatti	2025	St. Francis Xavier's Church	
Visuvasampatti	1969	Our Lady of Lourdes Church	
