= Our Lady of Lourdes Church, Rayakottai =

Roman Catholic Church in Tamil Nadu, India

Our Lady of Lourdes Church
- லூர்து அன்னை ஆலயம்
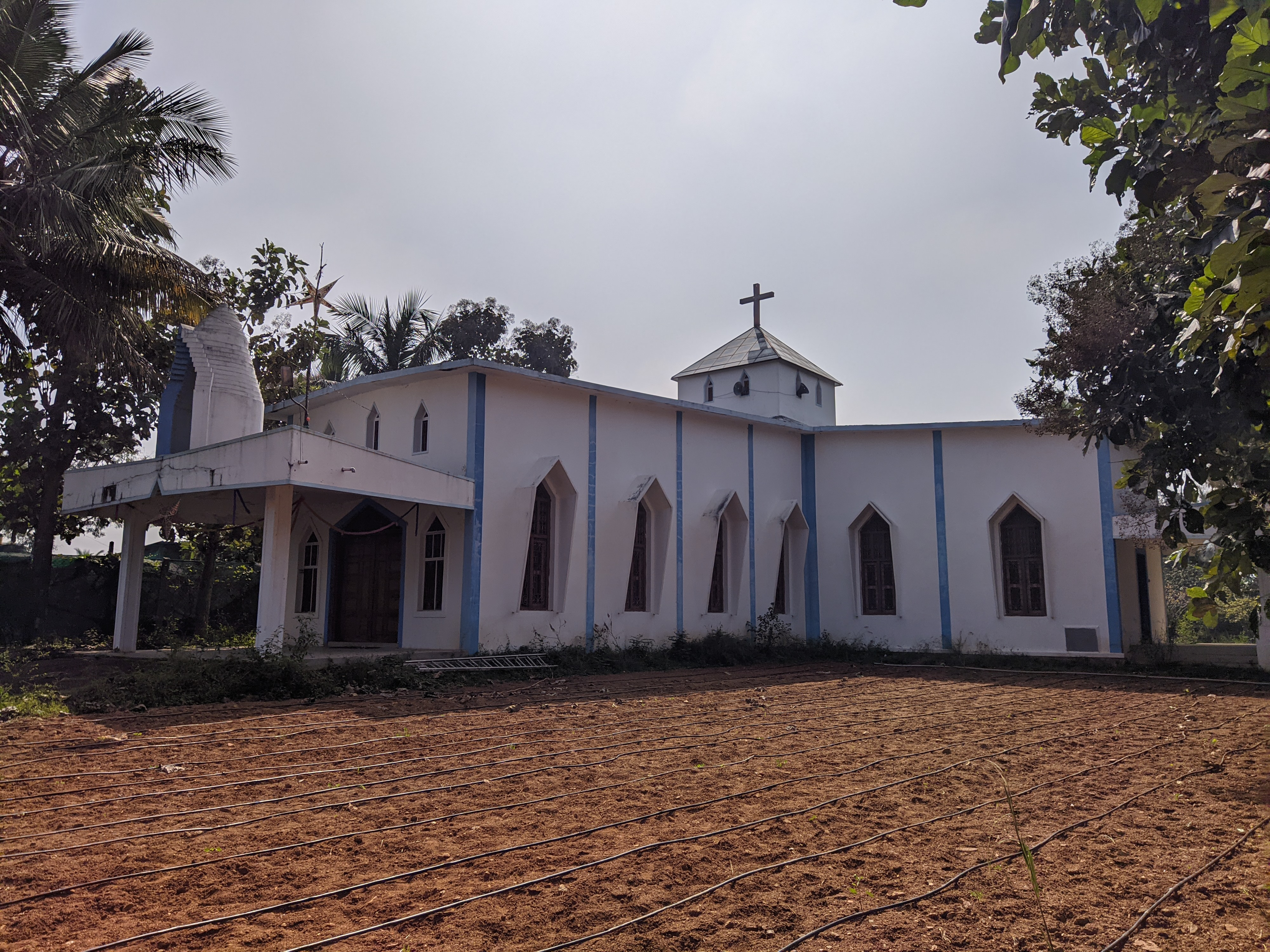
- Side View of this church
- Our Lady of Lourdes Church
- 12.5232°N 78.0193°E
- Location: Rayakottai, Krishnagiri district, Tamil Nadu
- Country: India
- Denomination: Catholic
- Religious institute: Jesuit

History
- Status: Parish church
- Founded: 1995
- Founder: Fr. Heny Bonal MEP
- Dedication: Mary

Architecture
- Functional status: Active
- Architectural type: Church
- Style: Modern Architecture
- Groundbreaking: 1997
- Completed: 1999

Administration
- Archdiocese: Pondicherry and Cuddalore
- Diocese: Dharmapuri
- Deanery: Denkanikottai
- Parish: Rayakottai

Clergy
- Archbishop: Francis Kalist
- Bishop: Lawrence Pius Dorairaj
- Priest: Fr. Gnanapragasam

Our Lady of Lourdes Church is a Roman Catholic parish church located in Rayakottai, Krishnagiri district, Tamil Nadu, India. It falls under the administration of the Dharmapuri Diocese.

== History ==
The Catholic settlements in Rayakottai began after the British East India Company won the Third Anglo-Mysore War, and Rayakottai came under British on July 20, 1791. The Catholics in Rayakottai primarily worked in making explosives for the British. During this period, priests from Kovilur Parish, particularly Fr. Guöen, would visit Rayakottai to provide spiritual services to the Catholics. Captain Beva mentioned meeting Catholic priest Fr. Abbe Dubois in Rayakottai in 1816. However, after the withdrawal of British troops from Rayakottai in 1861, most of the Christians left the area, and there is no further record of Catholics in Rayakottai during that time.

In the early 20th century, the number of Catholic families increased in Rayakottai, and the spiritual needs of the community were taken care of by priests from Kovilur. When the Elathagiri Parish was formed in 1906, priests from Krishnagiri and Elathagiri began to serve the Catholics in Rayakottai. A letter written in March 1931 by Fr. Martin MEP, the Elathagiri Parish priest, to the Hosur Sub-collector, mentioned that the church would take care of the British graveyard in Rayakottai, which belonged to a Catholic organization. In May 1931, with the assistance of Fr. Gabrial Playoutst, the Krishnagiri parish priest, a survey was conducted and 1.88 acres of land were registered to the diocese. In the 1950s, Rayakottai came under the care of Kadagathur Parish. In October 1958, Fr. PA. Zackriyas, Kadagathur Parish priest wrote a confirmation letter to the Hosur sub-registrar stating that the graveyard, which had been occupied by others, still belonged to the Salem Diocese.

In 1985, when the Palacode Parish was formed, Rayakottai became its substation. The Palacode priest, Fr. Fr. Heny Bonal MEP, would visit Rayakottai once a month to conduct Mass in the houses of the Catholic families. In 1993, Fr. Bonal purchased land in Rayakottai and started building a parish house. The construction was completed on January 25, 1997. Initially, Masses were conducted in the parish house, as the Catholic population in Rayakottai was relatively small. In June 1997, the construction of the church was started. During this time, Fr. Bonal was in charge of Shoolagiri and Rayakottai. Additionally, the priests of Rayakottai also conducted Masses at the Panjampalli Sri Lankan Tamil Refugee camp. After two years of construction, the church was inaugurated on April 18, 1999, with the blessings of the Dharmapuri Bishop Joseph Anthony Irudayaraj.

== Parish Priest ==
Served Year	Priest names
1995-2009	Rev. Fr. Heny Bonal MEP
2009-2014	Rev. Fr. Henry George
2014-2019	Rev. Fr. Mariya Joseph
2019–2023	Rev. Fr. A. Thomas
From 2023	Rev. Fr. L. Zacharias

== See also ==
- Christ the King Church, Palacode
- St. Francis Xavier Church, Kovilur
