= Sacred Heart Cathedral, Dharmapuri =

Roman Catholic Church in Tamil Nadu, India

Sacred Heart Cathedral
- Sacred Heart Church
- திரு இருதய ஆண்டவர் பேராலயம்
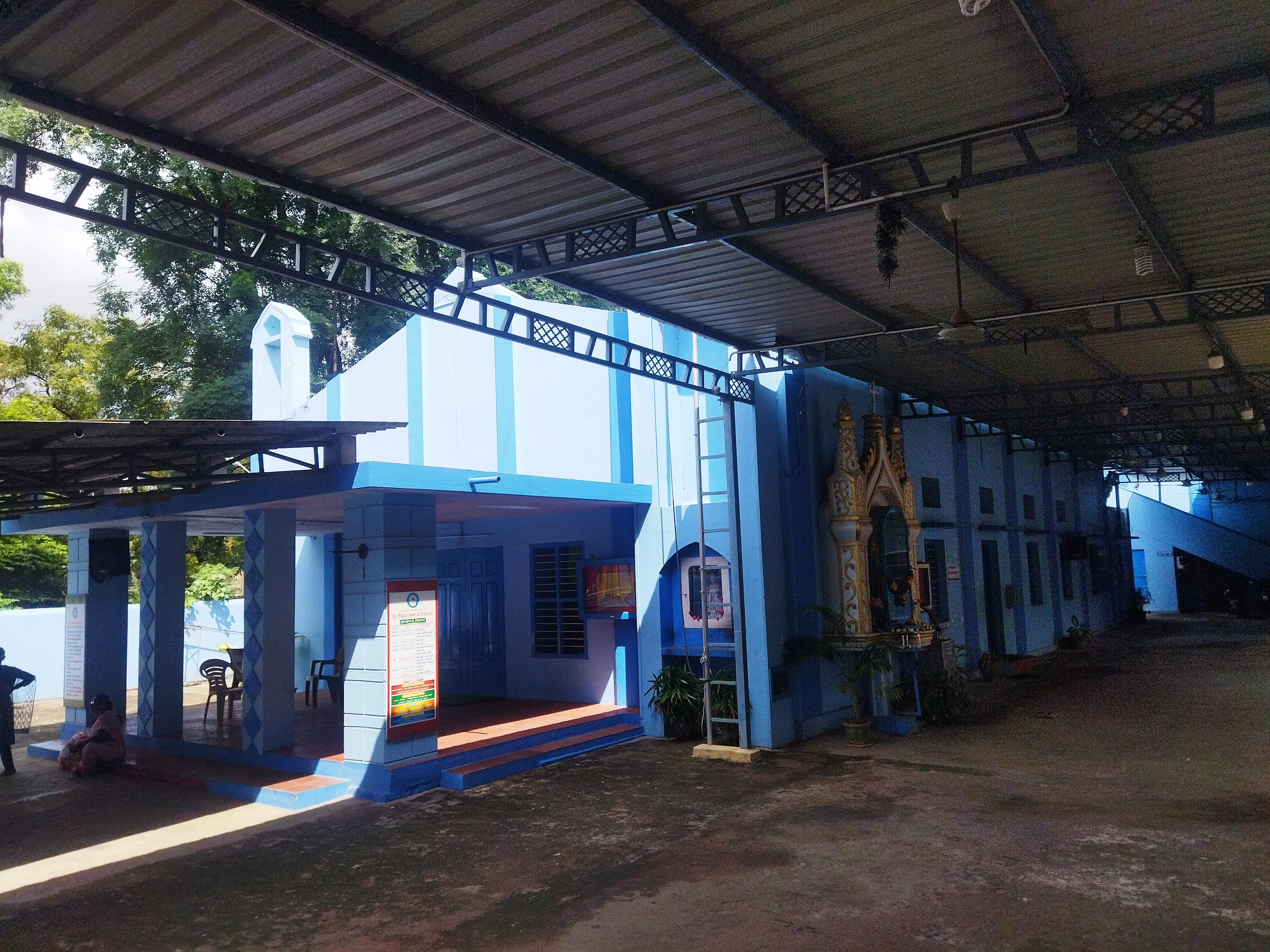
- Side View of this church
- Sacred Heart Cathedral
- 12.1361°N 78.1642°E
- Location: Dharmapuri, Dharmapuri district, Tamil Nadu
- Country: India
- Denomination: Catholic
- Religious institute: Jesuit

History
- Status: Cathedral
- Founded: 1906
- Founder: Fr. P.A. Zacharias
- Dedication: Jesus

Architecture
- Functional status: Active
- Architectural type: Cathedral
- Style: Modern Architecture
- Groundbreaking: 1972
- Completed: 1976

Administration
- Archdiocese: Pondicherry and Cuddalore
- Diocese: Dharmapuri
- Deanery: Dharmapuri
- Parish: Dharmapuri

Clergy
- Archbishop: Antony Anandarayar
- Bishop: Lawrence Pius Dorairaj
- Priest: Fr. A. Susairaj

The Sacred Heart Cathedral is a Roman Catholic parish church located in the heart of Dharmapuri town, Tamil Nadu, India. Currently, a new and larger Sacred Heart Cathedral is under construction on Annasagaram Lake Road, Dharmapuri. This cathedral comes under the administration of the Dhramapuri Diocese.

== History ==
The history of the Dharmapuri Church dates back to the 17th century when Jesuit priests from the Mysore mission began their missionary work in the region. In 1656, Fr. Semau Martin visited Dharmapuri and encountered three Catholics in the area. Then in 1661, Leonard Senomi, a Mysore missionary, also visited Dharmapuri mentioned with the help of Solapatti preacher some people convert to Catholicism. A chapel dedicated to St. Joseph was built in Dharmapuri during that time.

Fr. Joseph Muchiralini resided in Dharmapuri and took care of the missionary activities in the nearby villages. In 1674, St. John de Britto (Arul Anandar) stayed in Dharmapuri for two days while transferring to Kolei (Kottagaipatti). According to the Mysore missionary book, Koonur, Dharmapuri, and Kapiganati were residential places for Jesuit priests in 1674. However, during the Maratha invasion in 1682, the Dharmapuri Church was destroyed, and the priests moved to Kovilur. After that, there is limited information available about the Catholic presence in Dharmapuri.

In the 20th century, the Catholic population in Dharmapuri increased with the establishment of the railway service between Morappur and Dharmapuri in 1906. Some Catholic railway engineers and workers, including Anglo-Indians, resided in Dharmapuri during this time. In 1918, Fr. Danish, a priest from Kadagathur, built a small church in Dharmapuri. When the Salem Diocese was created in 1930, Kadagathur became the Parish Church, and Dharmapuri church became its substation church. According to the Kadagathur church record in 1930, there were 25 families and 119 members in Dharmapuri. In 1940, the Dharmapuri Church underwent repairs as recorded in the Kadagathur Parish Record. However, the railway service between Morappur and Dharmapuri was stopped in 1945, leading to job losses and the departure of many Catholic families from Dharmapuri.

== Present church ==
In 1958, Fr. P.A. Zacharias, the parish priest of Kadagathur, acquired land near Netaji Road in Dharmapuri. In 1962, Fr. TC Joseph built a Parish house on that land. In 1965, Dharmapuri became the district capital, and in 1968, it this church became a Parish. Fr. Thomas Kuruvila became the first parish priest of Dharmapuri. The construction of the present Sacred Heart Church began in 1972 under the leadership of Fr. Kuruvila and was completed in 1976 by Fr. Isaac (Jr.). In 1982, the Dharmapuri Social Service Society (DSSS), an NGO founded by Jesuit fathers, started its work in Dharmapuri, providing support to many underprivileged people.

In 1997, Dharmapuri became a separate diocese from the Salem Diocese, and the Sacred Heart Church became the Cathedral for the Dharmapuri Diocese. In 2000, a parish house was built next to the church.The Dharmapuri Parish has several substation churches, including Sesurajapuram, Biligundlu, Oottamalai (Hogenakkal), Linganayakanahalli (Morappur), Nellimarathupatti. Then in 1979 Sesurajapuram become Parish church from Dharmapuri. Later in 2009 Nellimarathupathi carved out from Dharmapuri parish is become a new Parish church. During the tenure of Fr. Maria Soosai brought a land in Savalupatti and converted that as a residential area called St. Mary's Nagar with in this area a church was built in 2010 in the name of Annai Velankanni. Now this became sub station church of Dharmapuri Parish.

=== Education ===
In terms of education services, the SMMI sisters acquired land in Vimalapuri on Thokkampatti Road in 1996 and established a convent. They started Amala Primary School near the Sacred Heart Church in 1971, which later moved behind the Government Medical College. In 1968, the SMMI sisters also started Amala English Medium Primary School, which became a high school in 1998 and a higher secondary school in 2008.

In response to a request from Bishop Joseph Antony Irudayaraj in 2005, Salesian Fathers came to Dharmapuri and took charge of Don Bosco School in 2004. They also established Don Bosco Arts and Science College in 2007 and Don Bosco Teacher Training Institute in 2008. These educational institutions contribute to the development and growth of Dharmapuri and surrounding villages.

== See also ==
- Queen of Angels Church, Kadagathur
- St. Francis Xavier Church, Kovilur
