= Sacred Heart Church, Kelamangalam =

Roman Catholic Church in Tamil Nadu, India

Sacred Heart Church
- Irudhiya Andavar Church
- இருதய ஆண்டவர் ஆலயம்
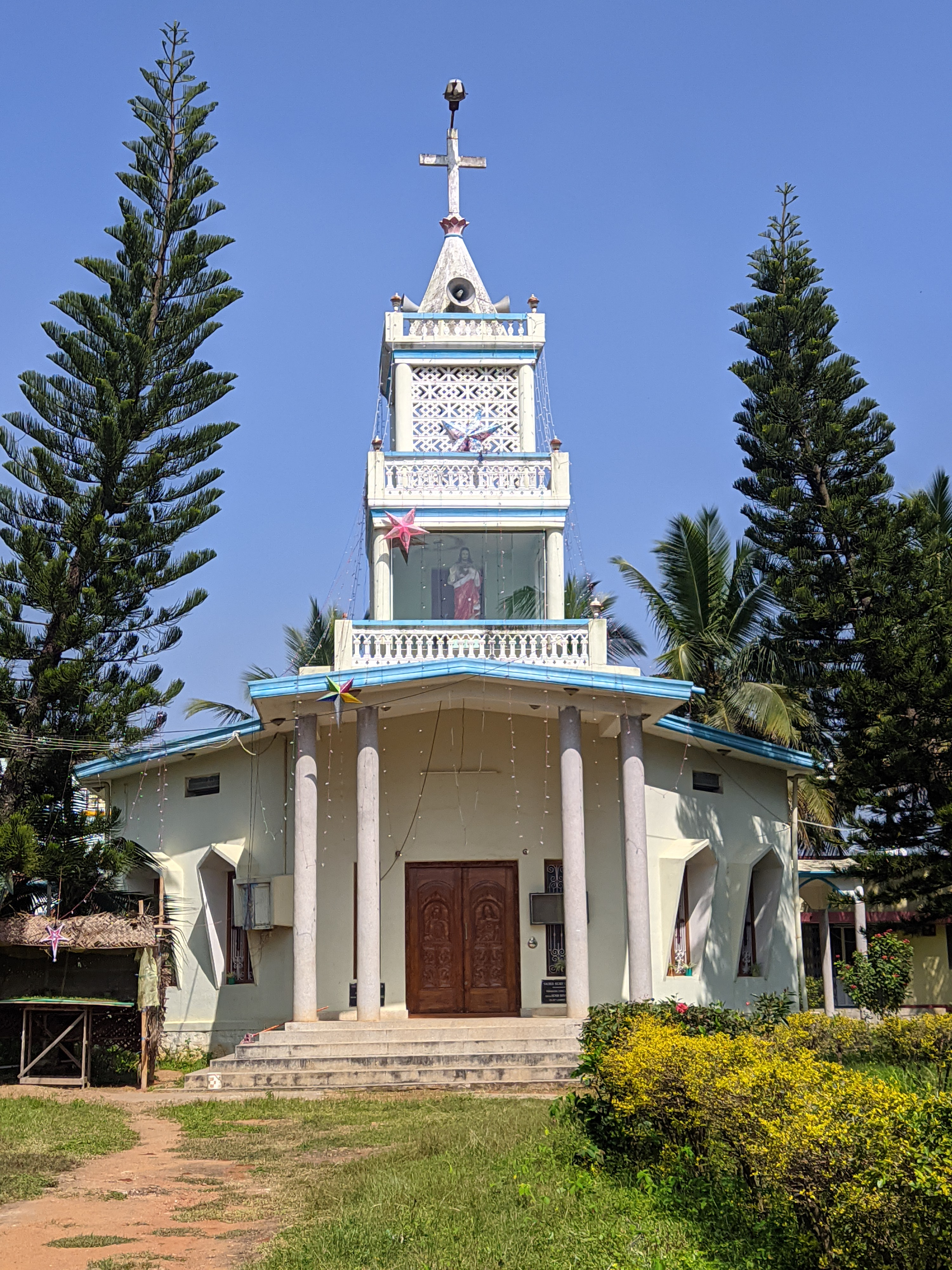
- Front View of this church
- Sacred Heart Church
- 12.60616°N 77.85722°E
- Location: Kelamangalam, Krishnagiri district, Tamil Nadu
- Country: India
- Denomination: Catholic
- Religious institute: Jesuit

History
- Former name: St. Antony Church
- Status: Parish church
- Founded: 1968
- Founder: Fr. Ignatius Kalathil
- Dedication: Jesus

Architecture
- Functional status: Active
- Architectural type: Church
- Style: Modern Architecture
- Groundbreaking: 2002
- Completed: 2003

Administration
- Archdiocese: Pondicherry and Cuddalore
- Diocese: Dharmapuri
- Deanery: Denkanikottai
- Parish: Kelamangalam

Clergy
- Archbishop: Antony Anandarayar
- Bishop: Lawrence Pius Dorairaj
- Priest: Fr. Lucas

The Sacred Heart Church in Kelamangalam is Roman Catholic Church situated in the Krishnagiri district of Tamil Nadu, India. In the 17th century, many Catholics and priests settled in this village for their missionary activities, making it one of the origin places for Catholic Christians in its Diocese.

== History ==
During the early stage of the Mysore missionaries, Kelamangalam came under their missionary jurisdiction. According to the 1668 to 1674 census, around 420 Catholics were recorded in this village. During that time, Kelamangalam became the residence of many missionaries. The Mysore missionaries referred to this place as Kappinahathi, which was located on the northern side of Kelamangalam. Over the centuries, now it became part of Kelamangalam Village now the word Kappinahathi is not in use.

Multiple letters were sent between 1673 and 1674 to the Mysore Mission regarding Kelamangalam issue. These letters mentioned the political pressure faced by Catholics, but it also highlighted the support given by a widow named Bangavamma, who stood with the Catholics and helped resolve the political issues peacefully.

In March 1674, a British officer from Hosur heard positive feedback about Fr. Immanuel Goryové, a priest serving in Kelamangalam. In a meeting, the officer requested Father Emmanuel to take charge of the administration of 30 villages around Kelamangalam. However, Father Emmanuel declined, stating that he came to serve the people, not to rule over them. The officer admired his commitment and ordered his music band team to play music in front of the church on Easter Sunday as a sign of respect. In Kappinahathi, there was St. Antony's church, and the priest resided in the church. Unfortunately, the church was demolished after the invasion of the Marathi military in 1682, leading the priests to move to Anekal for some years.

=== First Martyr of Dharmapuri Diocese ===
In 1708, Fr. Emmanuel de Cunha, who resided in Kappinagathi and carried out missionary activities till Kangundi. Kangundi is located in Andhra Pradesh, 19 km east from Kuppam. During his time, Fr. Emmanuel built a church in Kangundi, but the villagers and Kangundi zamindhar opposed it. In a riot, Fr. Emmanuel was attacked and expelled from the village. He then traveled for three days with high injury and settled back in Kelamangalam. Unfortunately, after some weeks on June 1, 1711, he died in Kelamangalam, earning the distinction of being the first martyr of the Dharmapuri Diocese.

In the 1720s, the Mysore mission records mention the service of Fr. Raynor and Fr. Viayor in Kappinahathi. After 50 years, villages like Kappinagathi, Mathigiri, Eddappalli (Chinnapatti), and Denkanikottai were mentioned in their records. However, in 1784, during the invasion of Tipu Sultan, Edappally Church was demolished, and there are no further records found regarding Kelamangalam and Kappinahathi Village.

=== 20th Century ===
After a century-long hiatus, in 1960, some Catholics resettled in Kelamangalam, with the families of Dr. Amos and Periya Nayagam being key members. During this time, priests from the Dasarapalli Parish would visit their homes and conduct Masses for the villagers.

Later, on January 25, 1965, Fr. Ignatius Kalathil, the priest of Dasarahalli Parish, purchased an acre of land in Kelamangalam. On February 6, 1968, the Sacred Heart Church was built and opened to the public with the blessings of former Salem Diocese Bishop V.S Selvanather. Initially, it served as a sub-station church of Adikalapuram Parish, with Vincentian congregation fathers took care the church for many decades. Later, Fr. Henry Boyal completely renovated the church, and with the blessing of Bishop Joseph Anthony Irudayaraj of the Dharmapuri Diocese, it was reopened to the public on February 23, 2003. In 2004, the church was promoted to a Parish Church.

== See also ==
- Christ the King Church, Dasarapalli
- St. Francis Xavier Church, Kovilur
