= Christ the King Church, Palacode =

Roman Catholic Church in Tamil Nadu, India

Christ the King Church
- கிறிஸ்து அரசர் ஆலயம்
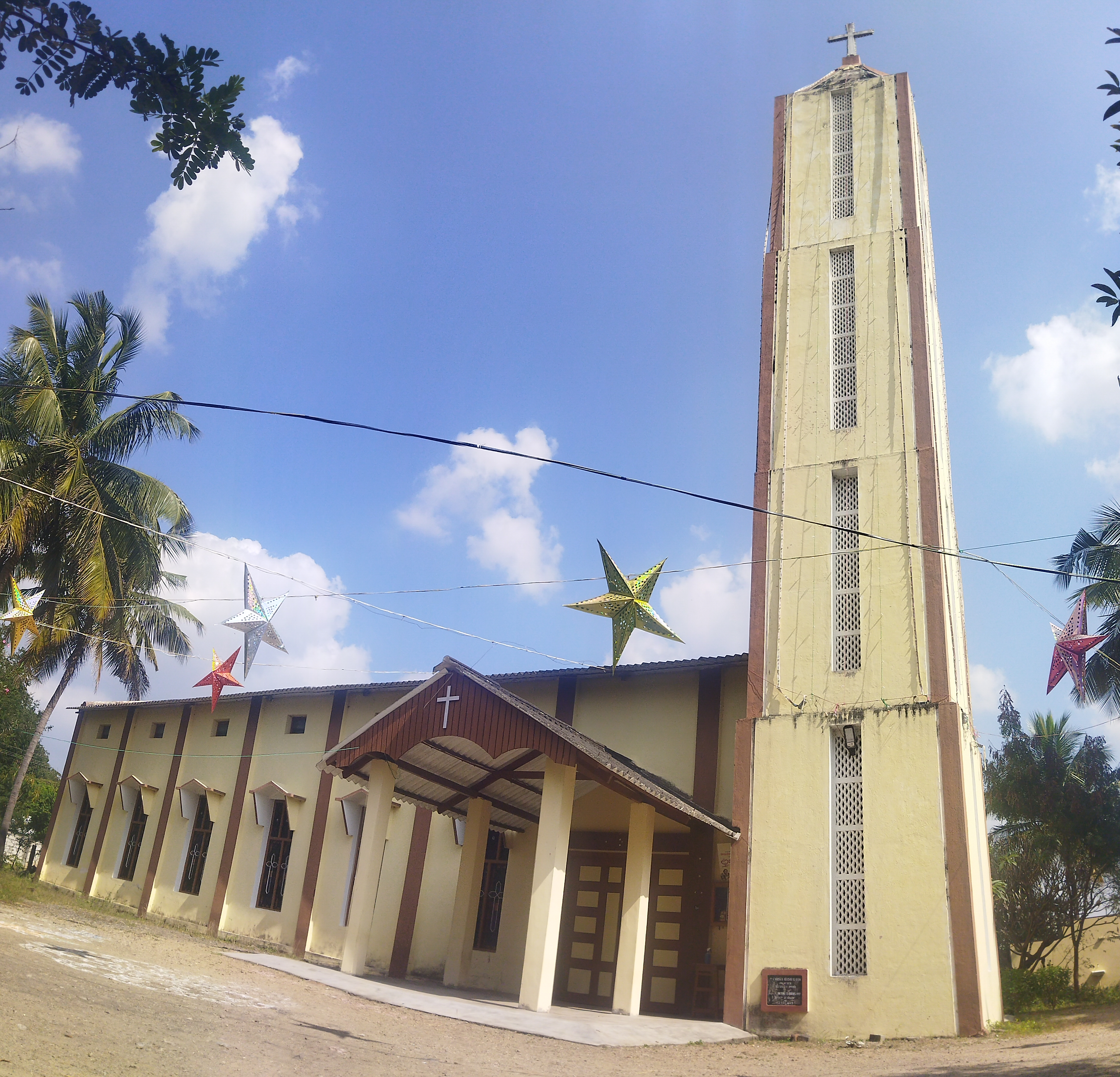
- Front View of this church
- Christ the King Church
- 12.3160°N 78.0777°E
- Location: Palacode, Dharmapuri district, Tamil Nadu
- Country: India
- Denomination: Catholic
- Religious institute: Jesuit

History
- Status: Parish church
- Founded: 1985
- Founder: Heny Bonal MEP
- Dedication: Jesus

Architecture
- Functional status: Active
- Architectural type: Church
- Style: Modern Architecture
- Groundbreaking: 1992
- Completed: 1993

Administration
- Archdiocese: Pondicherry and Cuddalore
- Diocese: Dharmapuri
- Deanery: Dharmapuri
- Parish: Kelamangalam

Clergy
- Archbishop: Francis Kalist
- Bishop: Lawrence Pius Dorairaj
- Priest: Fr. D. Immanuvel

Jesus the King Church in Palacode is a Roman Catholic place of worship located in the Dharmapuri district of Tamil Nadu, India. It is a Catholic church parish under the administration of the Dharmapuri Diocese.

== History ==
=== Jesuit Missionaries ===
During the time of the Mysore Jesuit missionaries, some Catholic faithfuls lived in Marandahalli. Although the exact origin of these Catholics is unclear, "The Jesus in Mysore" book mentions the presence of a church named St. Ignatius. However, another book by Fr. M.S Joseph states that St. Joseph Church was present in Marandahalli during that time. Fr. Antony Rebéro S.J served in this church, and between 1679 and 1682, 146 people were baptized according to their records. Unfortunately, in 1682, during and battle this church was demolished, and no further records are available for 17th century Marandahalli Christians.

=== Paris Missionaries ===
During the Paris missionary period in 1853, some Catholics settled in the village of Bevuhalli, located to the east of Palacode. Bir Muhammad Sahib, a representative of King Hyder Ali who lived in Krishnagiri, had a good relationship with the Paris missionaries due to his visit to Paris and meeting with King Louis XIV in the 1780s for political reasons. In 1853, Fr. Maury Amedes MEP, the priest of Kovilur Church, met Bir Muhammad and requested land in Bevuhalli for Catholics. Bir Muhammad generously gave the land for Catholic settlements, and approximately 30 families were settled in the village. A chapel was also built in Bevuhalli. However, due to the spread of malaria fever in the area, the population of the settlements did not increase, and later the Catholics relocated to other unknown places.

During the Paris missionary era, there were notable Catholic settlements near Palacode in villages such as Savadiyur, Kotavur, and Kethampatti (Kethanahalli). The settlement in Kethanahalli happened in 1845, while the origins of Savadiyur are unknown. Fr. Maria Francisco, a Kovilur Parish priest, occasionally visited Savadiyur village between 1842 and 1843. The Kovilur church records from the 1850s mention the registration of Savadiyur and Kotavur. Village Kotavur was present next to Savadiyur now the village name is not in use.

=== Under Salem Diocese ===
In 1930, when the Kadagathur Church became a Parish, Savadiyur's Sts. Peter and Paul church became its substation. In 1985, during the period of the Salem Diocese, a new parish was formed from Kadagathur, known as the Palacode Parish, which included Savadiyur, Kethanahalli, and Rayakottai as its sub-stations church during that time there was no church for Palacode. Fr. Heny Bonal MEP was appointed as the first parish priest of Palacode and resided in a rented house while conducting Masses in the other churches. In 1986, he purchased land for a church in Thimmampatti village, adjacent to Palacode.

Salem Diocese Bishop Michael Bosco Duraisamy wrote a letter to Fr. Bonal MEP, expressing his dream for the Palacode Parish. The bishop mentioned that there were fewer Catholics in Palacode compared to Savadiyur, Royakottai, and Kethanahalli. Palacode was chosen as the head of the Parish because it was a developing town with a need for good education and hospitality. The primary mission of Palacode was to provide good service and assistance to people of all religions.

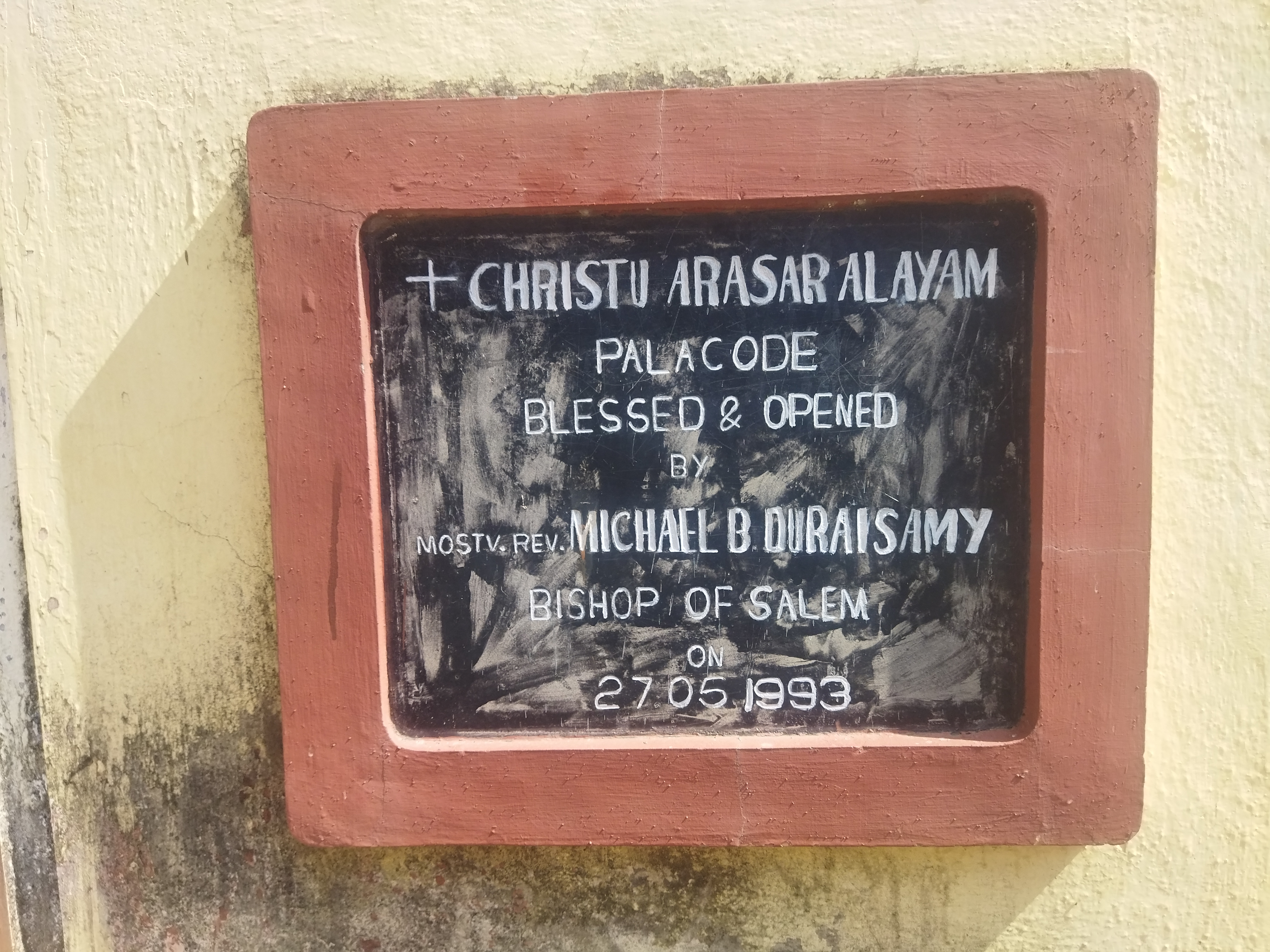
Inauguration Stone

As per the bishop's wish, Fr. Heny Bonal MEP built the Parish house and a hospital named Sagaya Matha on the purchased land in 1991. The administration rights of the hospital were given to the Cluny Sisters, who provided excellent service to the local community. In 1992, with the support of Fr. Heny, the Cluny Sisters started St. Lucy English Medium School, which later became a notable higher secondary school in the town. In 2013 Cluny sisters started Cluny Vidya Vihar (ICSE) school in Palacode.

After fulfilling the dreams of the Salem Bishop, the foundation of the Jesus the King Church was laid in 2002 and completed on May 27, 2003. The church services commenced with the blessings of the Salem Bishop. In 2000, the St. Xavier Church in Kethanahalli, which was a sub-station, became a new Parish church. Additionally, a new Velankanni church was built in 2003 for the Savadiyur sub-station.

== See also ==
- Queen of Angels Church, Kadagathur
- St. Francis Xavier Church, Kovilur
- St. Francis Xavier Church, Kethanahalli
