= Our Lady of the Rosary Church, Averipalli =

Roman Catholic Church in Tamil Nadu, India

Our Lady of the Rosary Church
- Our Lady of Holy Rosary Church
- St. Mary Church
- ஜெபமாலை அன்னை ஆலயம்
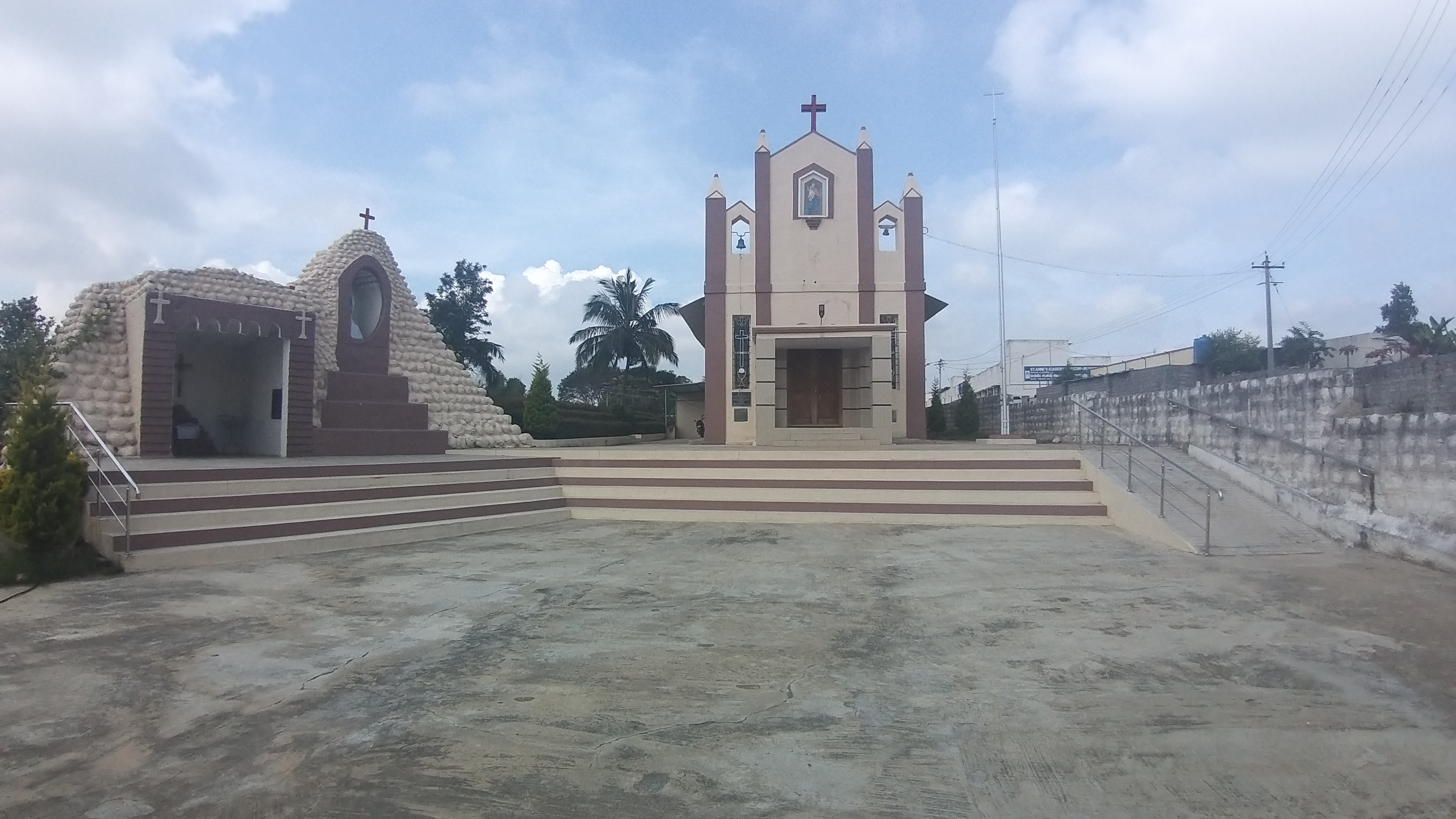
- Front View of this church
- Our Lady of the Rosary Church
- 12.571441°N 77.615195°E
- Location: Periya Averipally, Thally, Krishnagiri, Tamil Nadu
- Country: India
- Denomination: Catholic
- Religious institute: Jesuit

History
- Status: Parish church
- Founded: 1962
- Founder: Fr. Innasi
- Dedication: St. Mary

Architecture
- Functional status: Active
- Architectural type: Church
- Style: Medieval
- Groundbreaking: 1965
- Completed: 1967

Administration
- Archdiocese: Pondicherry and Cuddalore
- Diocese: Dharmapuri
- Deanery: Denkanikottai
- Parish: Averipally

Clergy
- Archbishop: Francis Kalist
- Bishop: Lawrence Pius Dorairaj
- Priest: Fr. G. Packianathan

Our Lady Of Holy Rosary Church is located in hamlets of Periya Averipally which is 6 km away from Thally. Originally it was a Sub-Parish church of Dasarapalli parish; later it became a mission church and in 2022 it became a Parish Church. The church serves under the administration of Dharmapuri Diocese.

== History ==
Peiya Averipalli has a Catholic history of 61 years. The original settlers of this village came from Belageri, a village near Madagondapalli. In 1962, eleven Catholic Christian families, including two Hindu families, relocated to Peiya Averipalli. As the village fell under the jurisdiction of the Dasarapalli Parish, it became a substation of the parish.

Rev. Fr. Innasi, the parish priest of Dasarapalli at the time, visited the families and conducted Mass periodically. Since there was no church building available, a house was chosen as the venue for Festival Masses. However, for all other spiritual needs, the people had to travel to Dasarapalli, the main parish located 14 km away from Periya Averipalli. As transportation facilities were limited during that period, people often had to walk the distance to attend the mass.

== Building of the church ==
In 1964, under the leadership of Rev. Fr. Savarimuthu, the parish priest of Dasarapalli at the time, the need for a church in Peiya Averipalli was recognized. Plans and preparations were initiated for the construction of the church. The local community generously donated the land and contributed their manual labor towards the project. Additionally, foreign agencies provided assistance in the form of wheat and butter.

On May 9, 1965, the foundation stone for the church was blessed by Rev. Fr. Odorico Berti from Salem. After two years of dedicated work, the church was completed. Officially blessed by Rev. Selvanathar, the Bishop of Salem Diocese, on October 6, 1967. The church was dedicated to Our Lady of the Rosary, serving as a place of worship and devotion for the Catholic community in Peiya Averipalli.

When Rev. Fr. John Kennedy became the parish priest of Dasarapalli, he proposed replacing the asbestos sheet roofs of the church with concrete roofing. However, this idea had to be abandoned due to the fact that the church walls were constructed using clay.

During the tenure of Rev. Fr. Rosario, some renovation works were undertaken in the church. The flooring was upgraded with the installation of tiles, improving the overall aesthetics and functionality of the worship space.

== Mission parish ==
In 2013, the residents of Peiya Averipalli made a request to Most Rev. Dr. Lawrence Pius, the Bishop of Dharmapuri, to elevate the village to the status of a parish. Recognizing the need and the growing faith of the community, the request was granted, and Peiya Averipalli was established as a separate parish.

In the same year, the Sisters of St. Anne's from Bangalore purchased land in the village and established a convent. The presence of the sisters brought a significant boost to the faith of the people. They actively engaged in various activities, including conducting evening tuition for the children of the village.

In 2017, the sisters expanded their services by starting a nursery and primary school, providing educational opportunities to the children of Peiya Averipalli. Additionally, Rev. Fr. P. Lourdusamy was appointed as the chaplain to the convent, and he resided in the sacristy of the church. He carried out renovations in and around the sacristy area, improving the facilities for worship.

In April 2017, Peiya Averipalli was declared a missionary place, and Fr. Vijay Amirtharaj was appointed as the priest in charge. He resided in the sacristy and worked to further the spiritual growth and development of the community. The establishment of the parish, the presence of the sisters, and the appointment of a priest in charge all contributed to the overall spiritual enrichment and progress of Peiya Averipalli.

== Renovation of church ==
To celebrate the golden jubilee of the church, the decision was made to renovate and expand the existing building in order to accommodate more people. The renovation project commenced in April 2018 and involved extending the church up to the sacristy area. As a result, the priest who had been residing in the sacristy moved to a temporary asbestos shed located near the church.

The renovation works were made possible through the generous contributions of the villagers and other donors. The total cost of the renovation amounted to 27 lakhs. The renovated church was officially blessed by Bishop Lawrence Pius, the Bishop of Dharmapuri Diocese, on 5 March 2019.

== Parish ==
After the establishment of Averipalli as a Mission parish, a priest began residing in the village. However, there was no dedicated presbytery or parish house for the priest. As a result, the priest had been staying in an asbestos shed located on the left side of the church. Recognizing the need for a proper residence for the priest, the people and the priest made a request to the Bishop.

In response to their request, the Bishop granted permission and provided funding to construct a presbytery for the priest. The foundation stone for the presbytery was blessed by the Bishop on 16 March 2021. Construction work commenced, and the presbytery was completed on 23 February 2022.

On the same day, in recognition of the growth and development of the mission place, the Bishop elevated Averipalli to the status of a parish. This marked an important milestone in the journey of the community, signifying its establishment as an independent parish within the Dharmapuri Diocese.
