= Adaikalapuram, Denkanikottai =

Village in Tamil Nadu, India

Adaikalapuram அடைக்கலாபுரம்
- Village
- Adaikalaapuram
- Location within Tamil Nadu
- Coordinates: 12.5732°N 77.8076°E
- Country: India
- State: Tamil Nadu
- Region: Kongu Nadu
- District: Krishnagiri
- Thaluk: Denkanikottai
- Block: Thally
- Panchayat: Mallasandiram

Languages
  - Official: Tamil
- Time zone: UTC+5:30 (IST)
- PIN: 635107
- Post Office: Bennangur
- Telephone code: 91-4347
- Vehicle registration: TN 70
- Lok Sabha Constituency: Krishnagiri
- Lok Sabha Member: A. Chellakumar
- Assembly Member: T. Ramachandran

Adaikalapuram is a village located under the administration of Mallasandiram Panchayat, Krishnagiri district, Tamil Nadu, India. It is located eight kilometers away from the major town of Denkanikottai.

Sesurajapuram holds a unique cultural identity, heavily influenced by the presence of Catholic missionaries who settled in the village over a century ago. As a result, the village has a notable population of Catholics who actively participate in religious rituals and festivities. The missionaries not only brought the Catholic faith but also played an integral role in establishing educational institutes in the village.

== See also ==
- Denkanikottai
- Kelamangalam
