= Dinnur, Krishnagiri district =

Village in Tamil Nadu, India

Dinnur தின்னுர் Dhinnur
- Hamlet/Village
- Location within Tamil Nadu
- Coordinates: 12.5868°N 77.7056°E
- Country: India
- State: Tamil Nadu
- Region: Kongu Nadu
- District: Krishnagiri
- Thaluk: Denkanikottai
- Block: Thally
- Panchayat: Kuppatty

Languages
  - Official: Tamil
  - Secondary: Kannada
- Time zone: UTC+5:30 (IST)
- PIN: 635118
- Post Office: Thally Kothanur
- Telephone code: 91-4347
- Vehicle registration: TN 70
- Lok Sabha Constituency: Krishnagiri
- Lok Sabha Member: A. Chellakumar
- Assembly Constituency: Thalli
- Assembly Member: T. Ramachandran

Dinnur, also spelled Dhinnur, is a hamlet located three kilometers north from its major village of Thally Kothanur in Tamil Nadu, India. It is eight kilometers away from the town of Thally. The primary occupations of the villagers are farming and labor service. This village comes under the Kuppatti Gram Panchayath.

Dinnur holds a unique cultural identity, heavily influenced by the presence of Catholic missionaries who settled in the nearest village Dasarapalli over a century ago. As a result, the village has a notable population of Catholics who actively participate in religious rituals and festivities.

== See also ==
- Dasarapalli
- Thally
- Christhupalayam
