= Kembathpalli, Krishnagiri district =

Village in Krishnagiri district, Tamil Nadu, India

Kempathpalli கேம்பத்தப்பள்ளி Kempathahalli
- Village
- Location within Tamil Nadu
- Coordinates: 12.5226°N 77.7002°E
- Country: India
- State: Tamil Nadu
- Region: Kongu Nadu
- District: Krishnagiri
- Thaluk: Denkanikottai
- Block: Thally
- Panchayat: Ballapalli

Languages
  - Official: Tamil
  - Secondary: Kannada
- Time zone: UTC+5:30 (IST)
- PIN: 635107
- Post Office: Balathottanapalli
- Telephone code: 91-4347
- Vehicle registration: TN 70
- Lok Sabha Constituency: Krishnagiri
- Lok Sabha Member: A. Chellakumar
- Assembly Constituency: Thalli
- Assembly Member: T. Ramachandran

Kembathpalli is a village in Krishnagiri district, Tamil Nadu, India. This is located 5 km south of its panchyat village Balapalli and 12 km away from nearest Town Denkanikottai.
