= Sollepuram, Saragapalli =

Village in Tamil Nadu, India

Sollepuram சொல்லேபுரம் Sollépuram
- Village
- Location within Tamil Nadu
- Coordinates: 12.6225°N 77.7519°E
- Country: India
- State: Tamil Nadu
- Region: Kongu Nadu
- District: Krishnagiri
- Thaluk: Denkanikottai
- Block: Thally
- Panchayat: Saragapalli

Languages
  - Official: Tamil
  - Secondary: Kannada
- Time zone: UTC+5:30 (IST)
- PIN: 635114
- Post Office: Saragapalli
- Telephone code: 91-4347
- Vehicle registration: TN 70
- Lok Sabha Constituency: Krishnagiri
- Lok Sabha Member: A. Chellakumar
- Assembly Constituency: Thalli
- Assembly Member: T. Ramachandran

Sollepuram a village located in Krishnagiri District, Indian State of Tamil Nadu. This Village comes under the administration Saragapalli Gram panchayat, Thally block. This village is 3 km away from the major village Madagondapalli.

Sollepuram holds a unique cultural identity, heavily influenced by the presence of Catholic missionaries who settled in the neighboring village Madagondapalli over a century ago. As a result, the village has a notable population of Catholics who actively participate in religious activities and festivities.
