= Christhupalayam =

Village in Tamil Nadu, India

Christhupalayam கிறிஸ்துபாளையம் Chrishthupalayam
- Village
- Kristhupalayam
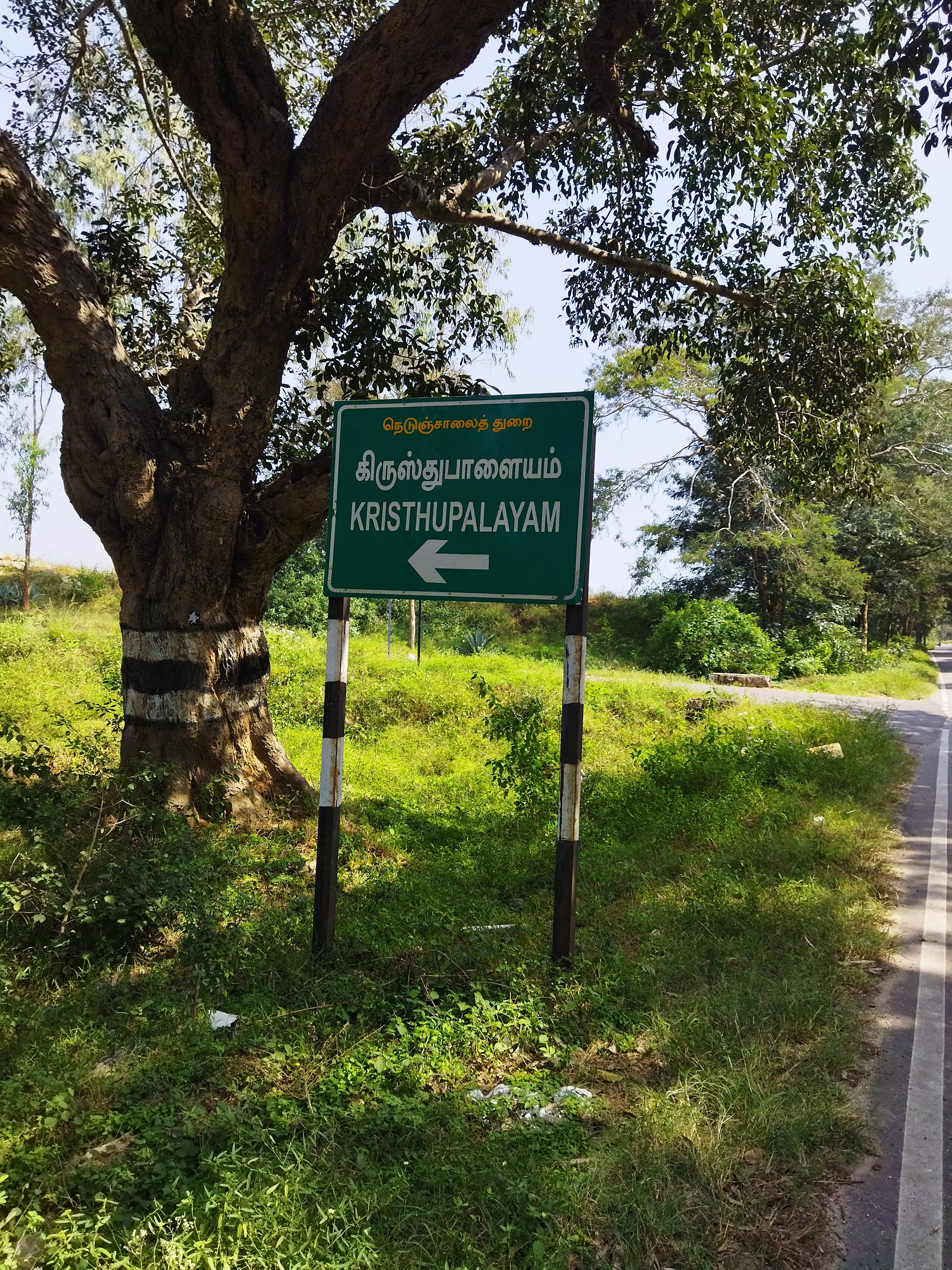
- Road Side Sign board which indicates this village name

- Location within Tamil Nadu
- Coordinates: 12.5553°N 77.7575°E
- Country: India
- State: Tamil Nadu
- Region: Kongu Nadu
- District: Krishnagiri
- Thaluk: Denkanikottai
- Block: Thally
- Panchayat: Marudanapalli

Languages
  - Official: Tamil
  - Secondary: Kannada
- Time zone: UTC+5:30 (IST)
- PIN: 635107
- Post Office: Anniyalam
- Telephone code: 91-4347
- Vehicle registration: TN 70
- Lok Sabha Constituency: Krishnagiri
- Lok Sabha Member: A. Chellakumar
- Assembly Constituency: Thalli
- Assembly Member: T. Ramachandran

Christhupalayam, also spelled Kristhupalayam, is a village located 6 km from the major town Denkanikottai, Tamil Nadu, India. The primary occupations of the villagers are farming and labor service.

Chrishthupalayam holds a unique cultural identity, heavily influenced by the presence of Catholic missionaries who settled in the village over a century ago. As a result, the village has a notable population of Catholics who actively participate in religious rituals and festivities. The missionaries not only brought the Catholic faith but also played an integral role in establishing educational in the village.

== See also ==
- Dasarapalli
- Denkanikottai taluk
- Thally
