= Gettupatti =

- Village
- Location in Tamil Nadu, India Gettupatti (India)
- Coordinates: 12°01′24″N 78°04′30″E
- Country: India
- State: Tamil Nadu
- District: Dharmapuri
- Taluk: Dharmapuri
- Panchayat: Dokkubothanahalli

Population
  - Total: approx. 7,000
- Time zone: UTC+5:30 (IST)
- PIN: 636807
- Telephone code: 04342

Gettupatti is a village in the Dharmapuri district of Tamil Nadu, India. It is located 20 km south of Dharmapuri and 308 km from the state capital of Chennai.
