= Averipally, Thally =

Averipally ஆவேரிபள்ளி Averipalli
- Village
- Nickname: Periya Averipally
- Location within Tamil Nadu
- Coordinates: 12.5712°N 77.6153°E
- Country: India
- State: Tamil Nadu
- Region: Kongu Nadu
- District: Krishnagiri
- Thaluk: Denkanikottai
- Block: Thally
- Panchayat: Achubalu

Population (2011)
  - Total: 1,345

Languages
  - Official: Tamil
  - Secondary: Kannada
- Time zone: UTC+5:30 (IST)
- PIN: 635301
- Post Office: Achubalu
- Telephone code: 91-4347
- Vehicle registration: TN 24
- Lok Sabha Constituency: Krishnagiri
- Lok Sabha Member: A. Chellakumar
- Assembly Constituency: Thalli
- Assembly Member: T. Ramachandran

Averipally is a group of hamlets located 6 km away from Thally town in Krishnagiri district, Tamil Nadu, India. This village comes under Achubalu Panchayat within Denkanikottai taluk. Periya Averipalli, Chinna Averipalli and Averipalli Agaraharam are the 3 sub-hamlets forms Averipally as a Village. This village located 3 km away from Karnataka State Border so apart from Tamil language Kannada also widely spoken in this village.

== See also ==
- Denkanikottai taluk
- Thally
