= St. Francis Xavier Church, Kethanahalli =

Roman Catholic Church in Tamil Nadu, India

St. Francis Xavier Church
- Savariyar Church
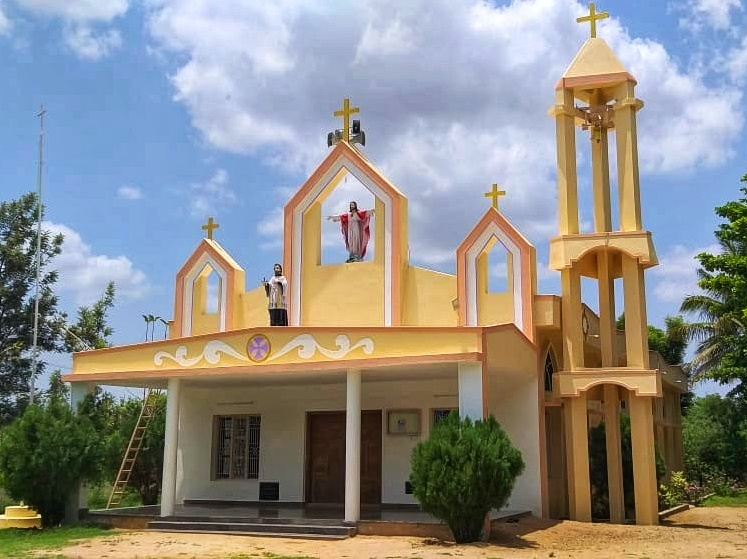
- Side View of the church
- St. Francis Xavier Church
- 12.32333°N 78.14237°E
- Location: Kethanahalli, Kariamangalam, Dharmapuri, Tamil Nadu
- Country: India
- Denomination: Catholic
- Religious institute: Jesuit

History
- Status: Parish church
- Founded: 25 July 1936
- Founder(s): Mathew Pulickal and Alexander Xavi

Architecture
- Functional status: Active
- Architectural type: Church
- Style: Modern Architecture
- Groundbreaking: 1999
- Completed: 2000

Administration
- Archdiocese: Pondicherry and Cuddalore
- Diocese: Dharmapuri
- Deanery: Denkanikottai
- Parish: Kethanahalli

Clergy
- Archbishop: Francis Kalist
- Bishop: Lawrence Pius Dorairaj
- Priest: Fr. U. Pushparaj

Saint Francis Xavier Church is a Catholic parish church around Kethanahalli village in Dharmapuri district in the Indian state of Tamil Nadu. The church is under the administration of Dharmapuri Diocese.

== History ==
In 1930 the place became a substation of Kadagathur St. Mary's Parish Church.

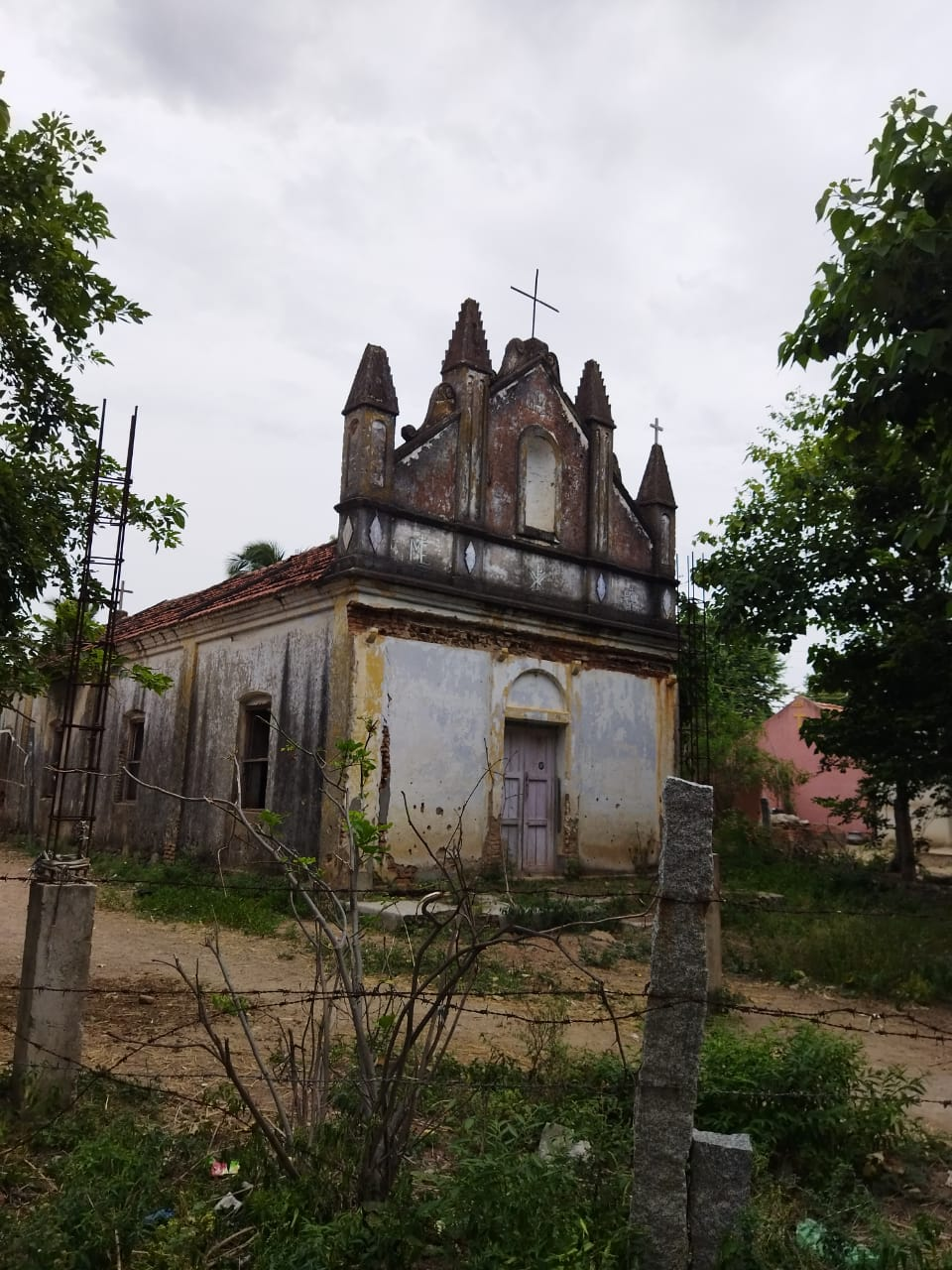
The abandoned Old St Francis Xavier Church, used before 2000

The parish of Palacode was formed in 1985, and this church became its sub station. Since then the Cluny sisters have worked there on weekends.

Thirty families lived in the village in 1930. By 1974 the number had grown and the parish bought a 1.59-acre land. Later a new St. Francis Xavier Church was built on July 25, 2000.

== Substations ==
Under this Kethanahalli Parish church, one Sub-Station church sits in Thumbanalalli Dam with two chapels within a 2 km radius. RC Fathima Primary School is run under the church administration.
