= Pushpagiri, Krishnagiri =

Village in Tamil Nadu, India

Pushpagiri புஷ்பகிரி
- Hamlet / Village
- Location within Tamil Nadu
- Coordinates: 12.5822°N 78.2844°E
- Country: India
- State: Tamil Nadu
- Region: Kongu Nadu
- District: Krishnagiri
- Thaluk: Krishnagiri
- Block: Bargur
- Panchayat: Belavarthi

Population (2011)
  - Total: 93

Languages
  - Official: Tamil
  - Secondary: Telugu
- Time zone: UTC+5:30 (IST)
- PIN: 635120
- Post Office: Belavarthi
- Telephone code: 91-4343
- Vehicle registration: TN 24
- Lok Sabha Constituency: Krishnagiri
- Lok Sabha Member: A. Chellakumar
- Assembly Constituency: Bargur
- Assembly Member: E. C. Govindarasan

Pushpagiri is a small village located under the Jurisdiction of Belavarthy Gram panchayat, Bargur block, Krishnagiri district in the state of Tamil Nadu, India. The village is 6 km (3.7 mi) away from Varatanapalli and 12 km (7.5 mi) away from its district capital Krishnagiri.
