= Selliampatti, Dharmapuri =

Village in Tamil Nadu, India

Selliampatti செல்லியம்பட்டி Selliyampatti
- Village
- Location within Tamil Nadu
- Coordinates: 12.1818°N 78.1241°E
- Country: India
- State: Tamil Nadu
- Region: Kongu Nadu
- District: Dharmapuri
- Thaluk: Palacode
- Block: Palacode
- Panchayat: Selliyampatti

Population (2011)
  - Total: 4,434

Languages
  - Official: Tamil
- Time zone: UTC+5:30 (IST)
- PIN: 636809
- Post Office: Papparapatti
- Telephone code: 91-4348
- Vehicle registration: TN-29
- Lok Sabha Constituency: Dharmapuri
- Lok Sabha Member: S. Senthilkumar
- Assembly Constituency: Pennagaram
- Assembly Member: S. Gajendran

Selliampatti, also spelled as Selliyampatti, is a Grama Panchayath village located in Dharmapuri District, Tamil Nadu, India. It is located ten kilometers northwest of its district capital, Dharmapuri, and thirteen kilometers south of its Thaluk capital, Palacode.

== Demography ==
According to the 2011 census, the village has a total population of 1,054 with a total population of 4,434. This includes 2301 males and 2138 females. Literacy rate in the village is 61.5%, which is less than Tamil Nadu's average literacy rate of 80.09%.

== See also ==
- Kadagathur, Dharamapuri
