= Madagondapalli =

Madagondapalli மதகொண்டப்பள்ளி ಮಾಧಗೊಂಡನಹಳ್ಳಿ Madhagondapalli
- Village
- Mathagondapalli
- Nickname: Madagondanahalli
- Location within Tamil Nadu
- Coordinates: 12.6278°N 77.7303°E
- Country: India
- State: Tamil Nadu
- Region: Kongu Nadu
- District: Krishnagiri
- Thaluk: Denkanikottai
- Block: Thally
- Panchayat: Madagondapalli

Population (2011)
  - Total: 4,979

Languages
  - Official: Tamil
  - Secondary: Kannada
- Time zone: UTC+5:30 (IST)
- PIN: 635114
- Telephone code: 91-4347
- Vehicle registration: TN 70
- Lok Sabha Constituency: Krishnagiri
- Lok Sabha Member: A. Chellakumar
- Assembly Constituency: Thalli
- Assembly Member: T. Ramachandran

Madagondapalli is a village situated in the Denkanikottai taluk of Krishnagiri district in the southern Indian state of Tamil Nadu. Governed by the Madagondapalli Gram Panchayat, the village falls within the administrative of the Thally Block. Positioned approximately 16 kilometers away from Madagondapalli, the nearest town is Hosur.

== History ==
According to the inscription of Hoysala king Veera Viswanathan in the Ateeswarar temple in this town, the old name of this town is Madhakamandan Palli.

== Demography ==
Based on the available data from 2009, the village of Madagondapalli is home to a population of 4,979 individuals residing in 1,148 households. Among these, there are 2,565 females and 2,414 males, accounting for 51.52% and 48.48% of the total population, respectively.

Out of the total population, there are 498 individuals belonging to the scheduled castes, with 251 females and 247 males. Females make up 50.4% of the scheduled castes population, while males comprise 49.6%. Scheduled castes constitute 10% of the overall population.

Madagondapalli exhibits a population density of 491.76 persons per square kilometer, as calculated from the available data.

== Geography ==
According to the available data from 2009, the total area of Madagondapalli is reported to be 1012.48 hectares. Within this area, the sown or agricultural land covers 653.39 hectares. Out of the agricultural land, approximately 558.29 hectares are classified as un-irrigated, while 95.1 hectares are irrigated.

Regarding irrigation sources, approximately 59.6 hectares are irrigated using wells or tube wells, while approximately 35.5 hectares rely on tanks or lakes for irrigation.

Furthermore, there is approximately 329.09 hectares classified as current fallow land, indicating agricultural land that is temporarily unused or left uncultivated. Additionally, there is approximately 30 hectares of fallow land other than current fallows.

== See also ==
- Denkanikottai taluk
- Thally
- Sacred Heart Church, Madagondapalli
