= Visuvasampatti =

Village in Tamil Nadu, India

Visuvasampatti விசுவாசம்பட்டி
- Village
- Visuvasapatti
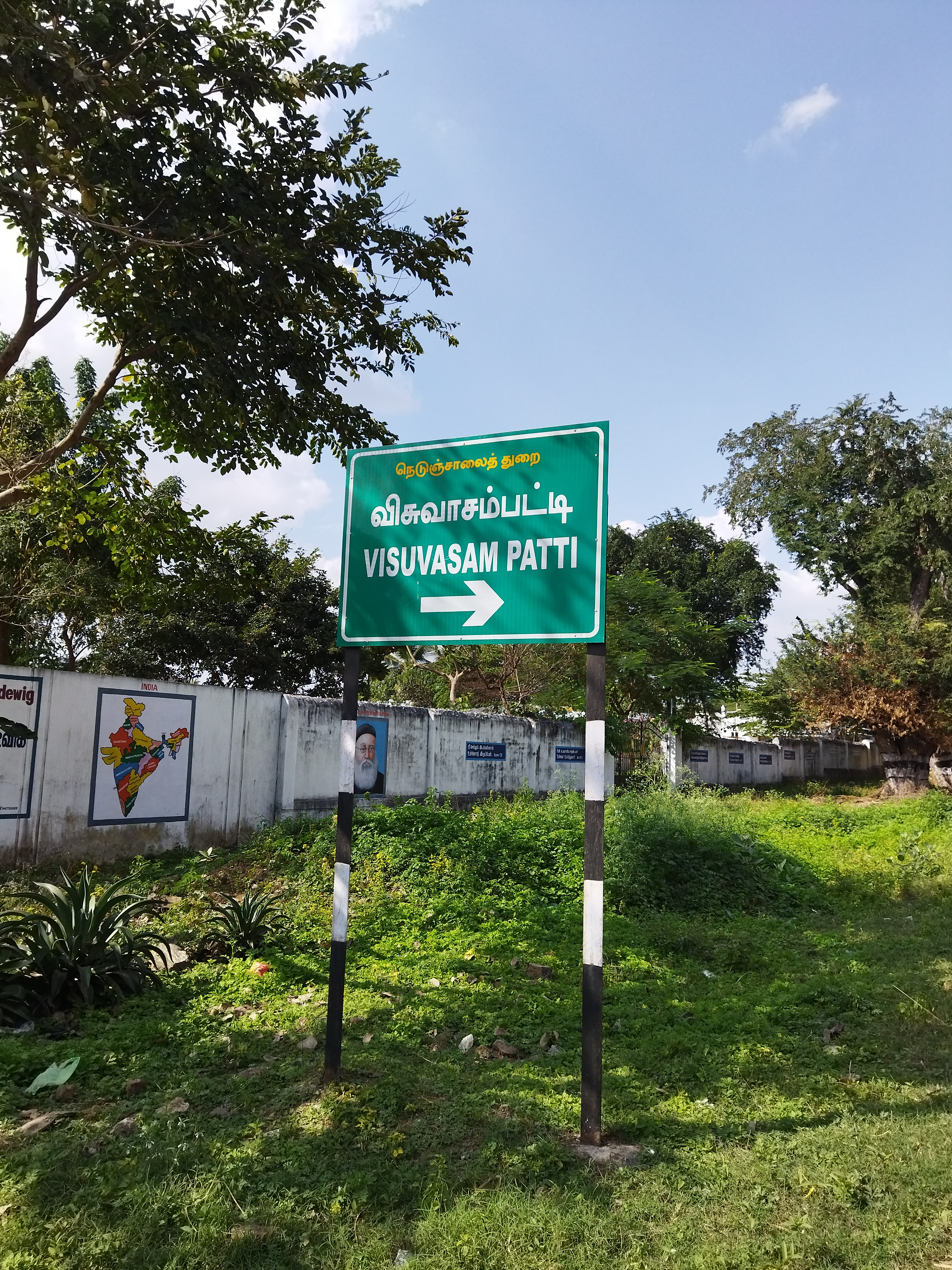
- Road Side Sign board which indicates this village name

- Location within Tamil Nadu
- Coordinates: 12.3184°N 78.5831°E
- Country: India
- State: Tamil Nadu
- Region: Kongu Nadu
- District: Krishnagiri
- Thaluk: Uthangarai
- Block: Uthangarai
- Panchayat: Maganoorpatti

Languages
  - Official: Tamil
- Time zone: UTC+5:30 (IST)
- PIN: 635307
- Post Office: Andiyur
- Telephone code: 91-4341
- Vehicle registration: TN 83M
- Lok Sabha Constituency: Krishnagiri
- Lok Sabha Member: A. Chellakumar
- Assembly Constituency: Uthangarai
- Assembly Member: N. Elaiyaraja

Visuvasampatti, also spelled Visuvasapatti, is a village located 12 km from the major village Uthangarai, Tamil Nadu, India. 22 km away from Neighbor District capital Tirupattur.

Visuvasampatti holds a unique cultural identity, heavily influenced by the presence of Catholic missionaries who settled in the village over a century ago. As a result, the village has a notable population of Catholics who actively participate in religious rituals and festivities. The missionaries not only brought the Catholic faith but also played an integral role in establishing educational institute in the village.

== See also ==
- Tirupattur
- Uthangarai
