= Kodiyalam, Krishnagiri district =

Coordinates: 12°51′15″N 77°50′39″E

Kodiyalam
- village
- Interactive map of Kodiyalam
- Country: India
- State: Tamil Nadu
- District: Krishnagiri
- Taluk: Denkanikottai

Languages
  - Official: Tamil
- Time zone: UTC+5:30 (IST)
- Postal code: 635114

Kodiyalam is a village in the Denkanikottai taluk of Krishnagiri district, Tamil Nadu, India.
