= Dasarapalli =

Village in Tamil Nadu, India

Dasarapalli தசரப்பள்ளி
- Village
- Dasarahalli
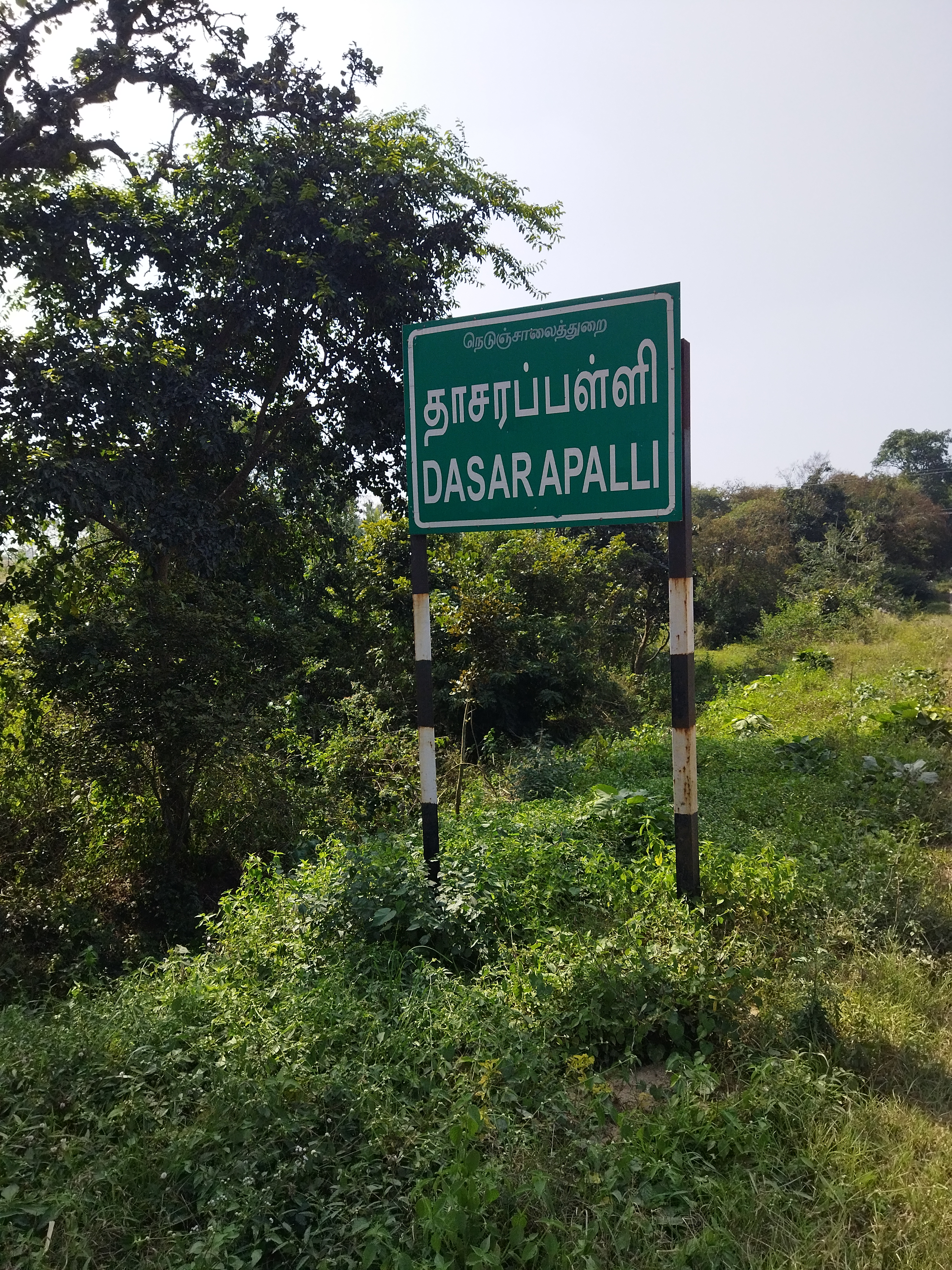
- Road Side Sign board which indicates this village name

- Location within Tamil Nadu
- Coordinates: 12.5767°N 77.7007°E
- Country: India
- State: Tamil Nadu
- Region: Kongu Nadu
- District: Krishnagiri
- Thaluk: Denkanikottai
- Block: Thally
- Panchayat: Kuppatty

Languages
  - Official: Tamil
  - Secondary: Kannada
- Time zone: UTC+5:30 (IST)
- PIN: 635118
- Post Office: Thally Kothanur
- Telephone code: 91-4347
- Vehicle registration: TN 70
- Lok Sabha Constituency: Krishnagiri
- Lok Sabha Member: A. Chellakumar
- Assembly Constituency: Thalli
- Assembly Member: T. Ramachandran

Dasarapalli, also spelled Dasarapally, is a village located east of the village of Thally Kothanur in Tamil Nadu, India. It is five kilometers away from the town of Thally. The primary occupations of the villagers are farming and labor service.

Dasarapalli holds a unique cultural identity, heavily influenced by the presence of Catholic missionaries who settled in the village over a century ago. As a result, the village has a notable population of Catholics who actively participate in religious rituals and festivities. The missionaries not only brought the Catholic faith but also played an integral role in establishing educational institutions in the village.

== See also ==
- Denkanikottai taluk
- Thally
- Christhupalayam
