= Sesurajapuram =

Village in Tamil Nadu, India

Sesurajapuram சேசுராஜபுரம்
- Village
- Jesurajapuram
- Nickname: Cēcurājapuram
- Location within Tamil Nadu
- Coordinates: 12.2717°N 77.7439°E
- Country: India
- State: Tamil Nadu
- Region: Kongu Nadu
- District: Krishnagiri
- Thaluk: Uthangarai
- Block: Uthangarai
- Panchayat: Natrampalayam

Languages
  - Official: Tamil
  - Secondary: Kannada
- Time zone: UTC+5:30 (IST)
- PIN: 635102
- Post Office: Sesurajapuram
- Telephone code: 91-4347
- Vehicle registration: TN 70
- Lok Sabha Constituency: Krishnagiri
- Lok Sabha Member: A. Chellakumar
- Assembly Member: T. Ramachandran

Sesurajapuram is a village in Krishnagiri district, Tamil Nadu state, India. It is situated between Anchetty (which it is located 22 kilometers south of) and Hogenakkal Road. It is surrounded by the Natrampalayam Reserve Forest.

Sesurajapuram holds a unique cultural identity, heavily influenced by the presence of Catholic missionaries who relocated in 1920s to 1940s most migrants happened due to land acquired by British Indian Government for Stanley Reservoir (Mettur Dam). As a result, the village has a notable population of Catholics who actively participate in religious rituals and festivities. The Catholic missionaries also played an integral role in establishing educational institute in the village.
