= Rayakottai railway station =

Railway station in Tamil Nadu, India

Rayakottai
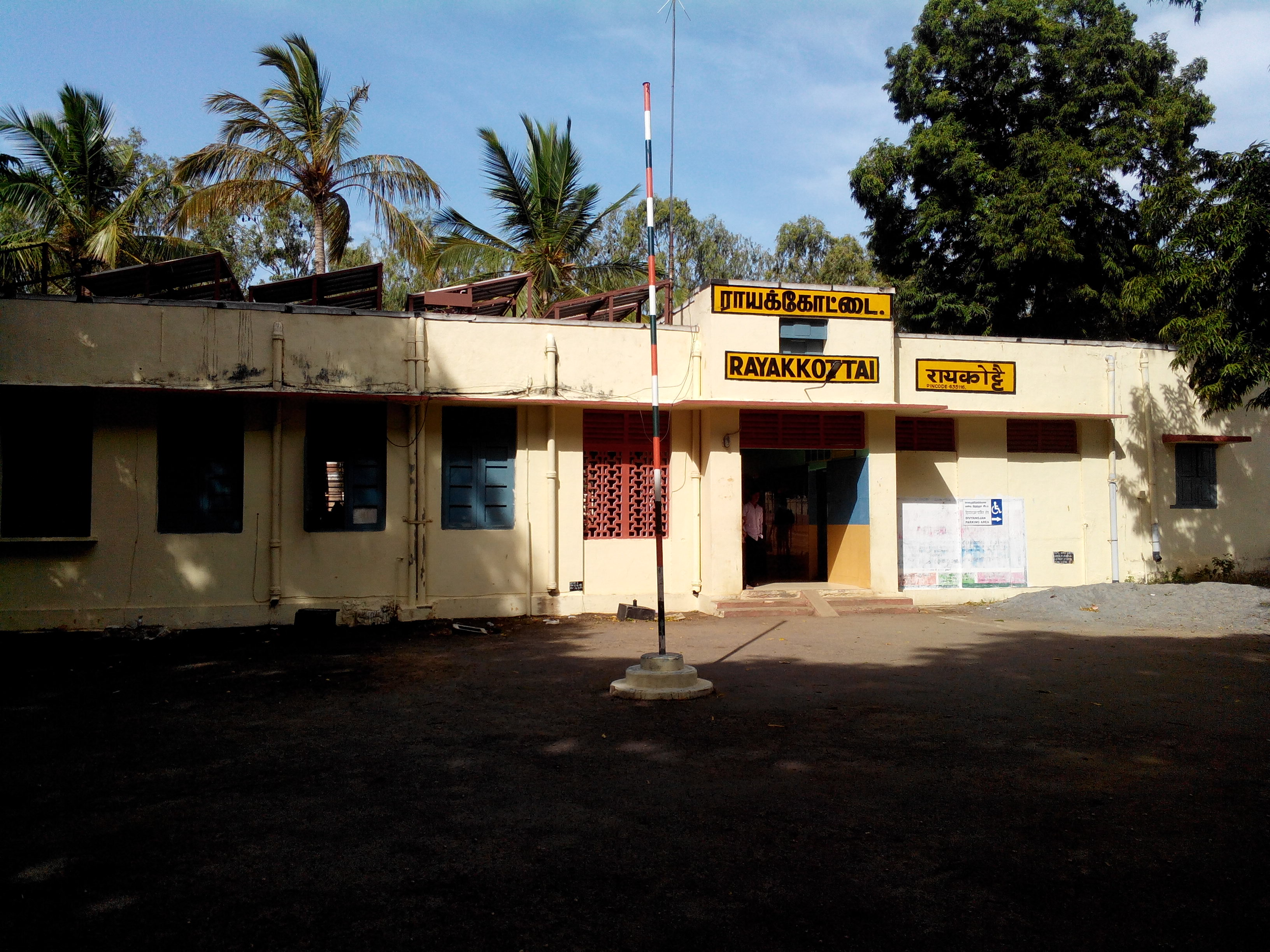
- Rayakottai railway station

General information
- Location: Dharmapuri–Hosur Highway, Krishnagiri district, Tamil Nadu; India
- Coordinates: 12.7184°N 77.8229°E
- Elevation: 723 metres (2,372 ft)
- System: Indian Railways station
- Owner: South Western Railway zone of the Indian Railways
- Line: Salem–Bangalore line via Dharmapuri
- Platforms: 2

Construction
- Structure type: Standard (on-ground station)
- Parking: Yes

Other information
- Status: Functioning
- Station code: RYC
- Zone(s): South Western Railway zone
- Division(s): Bangalore
Location
- Location within Tamil Nadu Location within India

Rayakottai railway station is a train station serving the town of Hosur in Krishnagiri district of Tamil Nadu. The station falls on the Salem–Bangalore line and is the closest railway link for the town of Krishnagiri, a district headquarters in Tamil Nadu.
