= Veppampatti, Dharmapuri district =

Village in Tamil Nadu, India

Veppampatti வேப்பம்பட்டி
- Village
- Location within Tamil Nadu
- Coordinates: 12.04639°N 78.56058°E
- Country: India
- State: Tamil Nadu
- Region: Kongu Nadu
- District: Dharmapuri
- Thaluk: Harur
- Block: Harur
- Panchayat: Veppampatti

Population (2011)
  - Total: 2,921

Languages
  - Official: Tamil
  - Secondary: Telugu
- Time zone: UTC+5:30 (IST)
- PIN: 636903
- Post Office: Veppampatti
- Telephone code: 91-4346
- Vehicle registration: TN 29Z
- Lok Sabha Constituency: Dharmapuri
- Lok Sabha Member: A. Mani
- Assembly constituency: Harur
- Assembly Member: V. Sampathkumar

Veppampatti is a village in the Harur taluk of Dharmapuri district, Tamil Nadu, India. It is located about 8 km from the sub-district headquarters at Harur and 51 km from the district headquarters at Dharmapuri. According to the 2009 records, Veppampatti also functions as a gram panchayat.

Nestled in the middle of the Dharmapuri region, Veppampatti holds an identity that is unique to its location.
