= Queen of Angels Church, Kadagathur =

Roman Catholic Church in Tamil Nadu, India

Queen of Angels Church
- Our Lady of Queen of Angels Church
- St. Mary's Church
- சம்மனசுகளின் இராக்கினி ஆலயம்
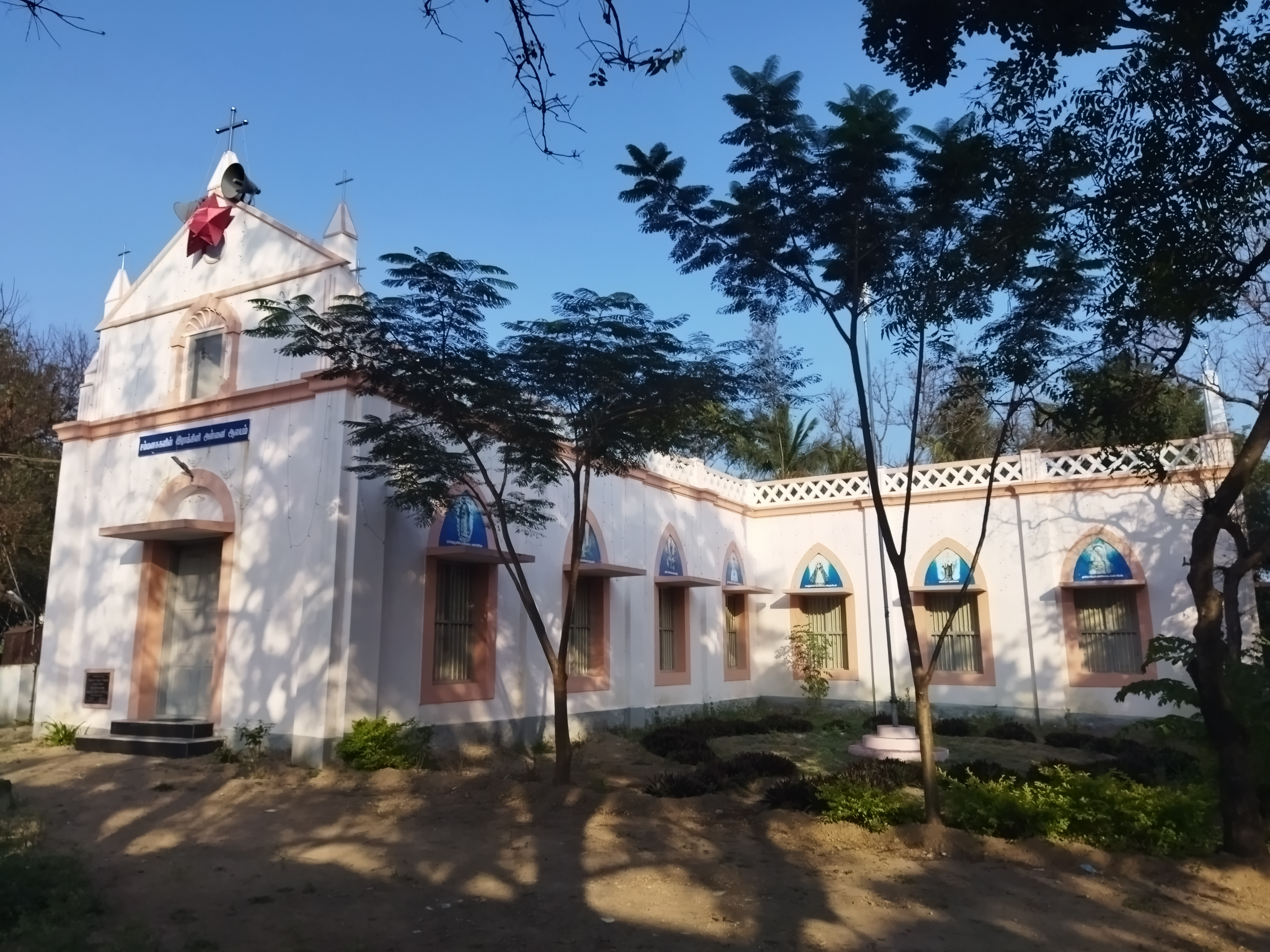
- Side View of this church
- Queen of Angels Church
- 12.1730001°N 78.1383023°E
- Location: Kadagathur, Dharmapuri Dt, Tamil Nadu
- Country: India
- Denomination: Catholic
- Religious institute: Jesuit

History
- Former name: St. Sebastian Church
- Status: Parish church
- Founded: 1873
- Founder: Fr. Loius Auguste Chevalier
- Dedication: St. Mary

Architecture
- Functional status: Active
- Architectural type: Church
- Style: Medieval
- Completed: 1932

Administration
- Archdiocese: Pondicherry and Cuddalore
- Diocese: Dharmapuri
- Deanery: Dharmapuri
- Parish: Kadagathur

Clergy
- Archbishop: Francis Kalist
- Bishop: Lawrence Pius Dorairaj
- Priest: Fr. Arockia Savariappan

Queen of Angels Church or St. Mary's Church is located in Kadagathur village, Dharamapuri District, Tamil Nadu, India. Due to Catholic settlements in 19th century this is second oldest church in its Dharmapuri Diocese.

== History ==
After the riots against Catholics in Pennagaram, many Catholics were forced to scatter to different locations. A significant number of them found settlement in Tirupattur, while others sought refuge in Kadagathur with the assistance of local leader Chinnappa Nayakar. He graciously offered shelter to the Catholics within his fort and even allocated a section of it as a prayer hall for their use. Interestingly, there is an oral tradition that suggests the present-day abandoned St. Antony's Church in Kolathur was originally Chinnappa Nayakar's stable, and his cemetery can still be found in the village. It is worth noting that Kolathur is now part of Gollapatti village, and the name Kolathur is no longer in use. The church in Gollapatty is known as St. Mary Magdalene Church, while the church in Pennagaram was also named St. Mary Magdalene Church. There is a local account that suggests the statue in the present Gollapatty church was relocated from the Pennagaram Church.

As part of their missionary work, the Paris MEP Fathers took responsibility for the village of Kadagathur following the footsteps of the Jesuits Fathers. Fr. MS. Joseph reported that Mass and prayers were conducted within Chinnappa Nayakar's fort. Later, Kadagathur came under the jurisdiction of the Kovilur parish. Later additional priest from Kovilur stayed in Kadagathur for a few months to preach. In the 1830s, people from Kolagathur, Selliampatti, Savaloor, Kotavoor, Savadiyur, and Kethampatty attended the Kadagathur church. Presently, Kotavoor is part of Savadiyur.

As early as 1872, Fr. Athanase Pneau MEP and Fr. Dupas MEP stayed in Kadagathur. During the investigation conducted by Pondicherry Bishop Laouënan MEP in 1873, it was reported that there were 400 Catholics in and around Kadagathur, along with 300 Catholics around Savadiyur (present Palacode). In 1895, Elathagiri was separated from the Thirupattur - Koviloor Parish and established as a new parish church, leading to Kadagathur Parish being annexed under the Elathagiri Deanery.

In 1900, Kadagathur became a parish as part of the Kovilur Parish Deanery. The first parish priest of Kadagathur was Father Istanish-Laus, serving between 1910 and 1919. Subsequently, Kadagathur once again became a sub-station of the Kovilur Parish from 1919 to 1930. In 1930, Salem became a diocese separate from the Pondichery diocese, and Father Louis Auguste Chevalier from the Pondicherry diocese became the parish priest of Kadagathur. In the 1930s, the Franciscan Sisters of Mount Poinsur began their service in Pennagaram and subsequently continued their work in Kadagathur after leaving Pennagaram in 1939. At that time, the Kadagathur Parish extended from Rayakottai to Biligundlu, making it the largest parish in terms of area. The parish church of Kadagathur was originally named St. Sebastian Church until 1932 when Father Chevallier constructed the current Queen of Angels Church.

List of events take place in this parish
Date / Year	Events
1932	Primary School in Selliyampatti
1938	Building for Selliyampatty Primary school
1938	Built Church in Kethampatty
19-Jan-1952	A grotto was built for Our Lady of Fatima.
3-Aug-1952	Church Bell gifted by Dharamapuri KRMS Appavu Pilli
15-Aug-1953	Started celebrating Parish Festival
3-Mar-1954	Indian Ambasoitor of Pope Fr. Lucas SVD came to Kadagathur and lead groundbreaking for sister's convent.
17-Jul-1954	Fatima Middle school has started.
7-Jul-1955	SMMI Sister convent has started.
1980	New Parish Priest House
1988	Started Sacred Heart Hr. Sec. School
2004	St. Theresa Convent
2004	St. Cluny Convent

== See also ==
- St. Francis Xavier Church, Kovilur
- St. Francis Xavier Church, Kethanahalli
- Roman Catholic Diocese of Dharmapuri
