= Dharmapuri taluk =

Coordinates: 12.1260°N 78.154°E

Dharmapuri taluk is a taluk in the Dharmapuri district of the Indian state of Tamil Nadu. The headquarters of the taluk is the town of Dharmapuri.

== Demographics ==
According to the 2011 census, the taluk of Dharmapuri had a population of 441,115 with 225,969 males and 215,146 females. There were 952 women for every 1,000 men. The taluk had a literacy rate of 64.96%. Child population in the age group below 6 was 24,262 Males and 22,372 Females.

== Politics ==
It is part of the Dharmapuri (state assembly constituency) and Dharmapuri (Lok Sabha constituency).
