= Rayakottai =

Town in Tamil Nadu, India

Coordinates: 12.513818°N 78.032045°E

Rayakottai, also spelled Rayakotta is a town in Denkanikottai taluk, Krishnagiri District, Tamil Nadu, India. It is 73 kilometres (45 mi) from Bangalore. Also recorded as "Rayakottah" in the old gazette and district manuals

== Rayakottai fort ==
The fort is situated within the town of Rayakottai, which is one of the ancient fortresses in the Krishnagiri district. The fort was built by erstwhile Vijayanagara Raya Kings in 14th century. Later post 16th century the fort became part of Mysore Wadiyar Kings. During the Third Anglo-Mysore War The fort was captured by Major Gowdie in 1791 from Tipu Sultan and as per the Treaty of Srirangapatna, the fort and settlements were annexed to Madras Presidency by the British.It is now one of the protected monuments by the Archaeological Survey of India.

== Entymology ==
The name Rayakottai means "The Fort of Raya's" of Vijaynagar.

== Transport ==
In 2024 the town became part of Indian National Highway network with Rayakottai as mid point between Dharmapuri and Hosur by the newly constructed 6 lane NH 844

- The nearest airport is Bangalore International Airport
- The nearest railway station is Rayakottai railway station
- The nearest bus stand is Rayakottai Bus Stand

== Gallery ==
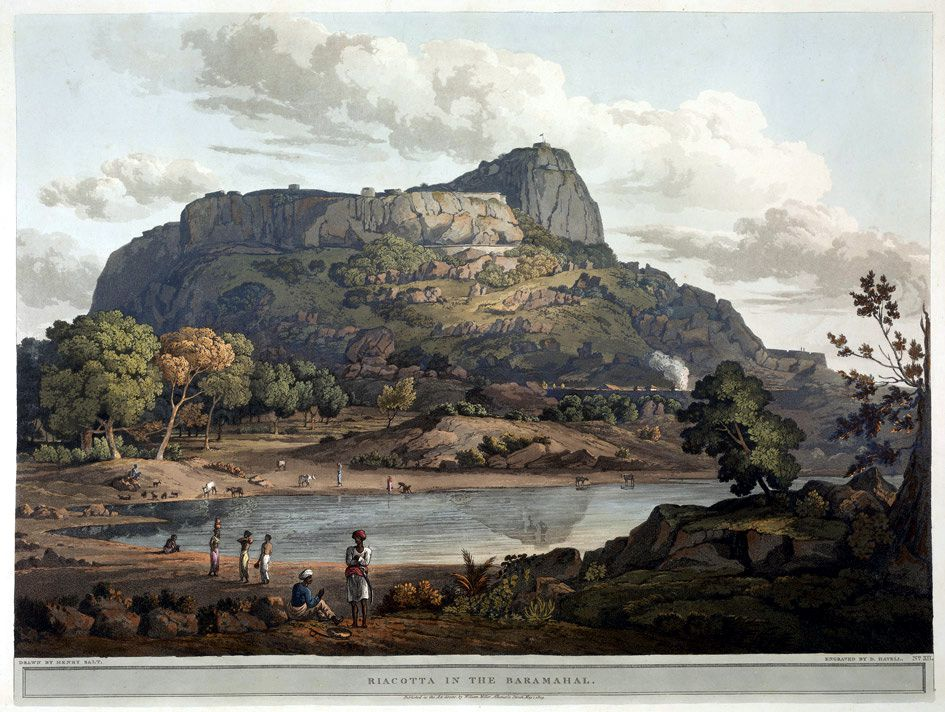
”Rayakottai Fort”
Henry Salt

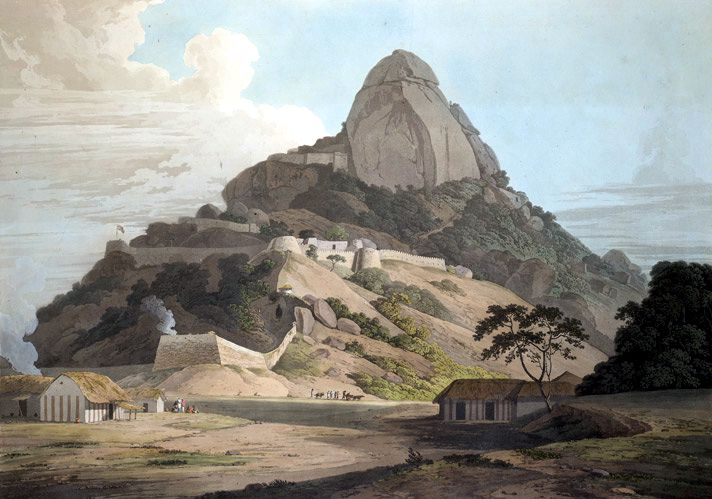
”Rayakottai Fort”
Thomas Daniell
