= Joseph Anthony Irudayaraj =

Indian Roman Catholic bishop (1935–2019)

Bishop Joseph Anthony Irudayaraj
- Bishop Emeritus of Dharmapuri
- Native name: ஜோசப் அந்தோணி இருதயராஜ்
- Metropolis: Pondicherry and Cuddalore
- Diocese: Dharmapuri
- Installed: 25 April 1997
- Term ended: 19 February 2012
- Predecessor: Michael Bosco Duraisamy
- Successor: Lawrence Pius Dorairaj

Orders
- Ordination: 20 April 1965
- Consecration: 24 April 1997 by Michael Augustine
- Rank: Bishop

Personal details
- Born: 4 October 1935 Chennai
- Died: 29 November 2019 (aged 84) Chennai
- Denomination: Roman Catholic
- Parents: Mr. Samuel and Mrs. Mary
- Education: B.Th & B.Sc (Physics)

Joseph Anthony Irudayaraj SDB, is the former and the first bishop of Roman Catholic Diocese of Dharmapuri.

== Early life ==
He was born in 1935 in Purasawalkam, Chennai, as the son of Samuel and Mary. He completed his primary education at St. Andrews School, Chennai, and his high school education at Don Bosco in Thirupattur. Later, he pursued a Bachelor's degree in Philosophy at Joseph's Philosophical College, Kothagiri. Subsequently, he obtained a Bachelor's degree in Physics from Sacred Heart Theological College, Shillong.

== Priesthood ==
After his ordination on 20 April 1965, under the Order of the Salesians of Don Bosco congregation, he was appointed as the Dean of Dominic Savio School in Tirupattur. From 1966 to 1971, he served as the director of Broadway Don Bosco Youth Club in Chennai. Following that, he was appointed as the director of Vellore Don Bosco Youth Club from 1971 to 1972.

In 1972-73, he went to Salesian Pontifical University, Rome for higher pastoral studies. Between 1973 and 1982, he managed various priest houses in Katpadi, Gandhi Nagar (Vellore), and Tirupattur. He then became the parish priest of Holy Spirit Church, Tagore Nagar, Pondicherry, from 1982 to 1983. From 1983 to 1989, he managed the Yercaud Retreat Center. Between 1989 and 1991, he served as the parish priest of Don Bosco Shrine, Ayanavaram, Chennai. Following that, from 1991 to 1996, he served as a Councillor of Don Bosco House in Broadway.

== Episcopate ==
He was consecrated as the Bishop of Dharmapuri on 24 April 1997, in Salem. The Diocese of Dharmapuri was carved out from the Diocese of Salem in 1997, and he took on the responsibility of building and developing the standards and infrastructure of the newly formed Dharmapuri Diocese.

During his time as Bishop, he made significant contributions to the diocese. He established 10 new parishes and 5 quasi-parishes, expanding the reach of the diocese's spiritual services. Additionally, he played a crucial role in the construction of a seminary to facilitate the education and training of priests in the region. Notably, under his leadership, around 23 churches were built to cater to the growing Catholic community.

After serving the diocese for 15 years, he retired on 19 February 2012. Later, on 29 November 2019, he died in Chennai at the age of 84.
