= Poolapatti =

Village in Tamil Nadu, India

Poolapatti பூலாபட்டி Poolampatti
- Hamlet / Village
- Poolappatti
- The location of this village in Tamil Nadu Map
- Coordinates: 12.0437°N 78.1675°E
- Country: India
- State: Tamil Nadu
- Region: Kongu Nadu
- District: Dharmapuri
- Thaluk: Nallampalli
- Block: Nallampalli
- Panchayat: Mittareddihalli

Population (2011)
  - Total: 103

Languages
  - Official: Tamil
  - Secondary: Telugu
- Time zone: UTC+5:30 (IST)
- PIN: 636804
- Post Office: Laligam
- Telephone code: 91-4348
- Vehicle registration: TN-29
- Lok Sabha Constituency: Dharmapuri
- Lok Sabha Member: S. Senthilkumar
- Assembly Constituency: Dharmapuri
- Assembly Member: Sowmiya Anbumani

Poolapatti, is a village also officially spelled as Poolappatti, is a village located 6 km east from the major town Nallampalli, Tamil Nadu, India. This village comes under the Mittareddihalli (M.Reddihalli) Gram panchayat.

== Culture ==
Poolappatti holds a unique cultural identity, heavily influenced by the presence of Catholic missionaries who settled in the Kovilur over a century ago. As a result, the village has a notable population of Catholics who actively participate in religious rituals and festivities.
