= Kadagathur, Dharmapuri =

Kadagathur Kadaikaattur
- Village
- Location of Kadagathur in Tamilnadu
- Coordinates: 12.17405°N 78.13611°E
- Country: India
- State: Tamil Nadu
- Region: Kongu Nadu
- District: Dharmapuri
- Taluk: Dharmapuri

Government
  - Type: Village
  - Body: Panchayath

Area
  - Total: 3.33 km^{2} (1.29 sq mi)

Population (2011)
  - Total: 6,096
  - Density: 1,777/km^{2} (4,600/sq mi)

Languages
  - Official: Tamil
- Time zone: UTC+5:30 (IST)
- PIN: 636809
- Telephone code: 04342
- Vehicle registration: TN-29

Kadagathur is a village panchayath under Dharmapuri Block and in Dharmapuri district in the state of Tamil Nadu, India. This village is located 6 km away from District Capital Dharamapuri. One of the Famous Kadagathur Lake in this village around 800 acres and Siva Temple 1000 years old in beginning of Lake. Village mainly focus Pongal Festival once in a year and Manjuvirattu is famous Celebration during the Festival.

Kadagathur Branch Public Library is located on near bus stand. Library contains more than 13000 books and Many News Journals.

== See also ==
- Queen of Angels Church, Kadagathur
- Dharmapuri taluk
