= Biligundlu =

Biligundlu Biligundu
- Mid-sized village in Krishnagiri, Tamil Nadu
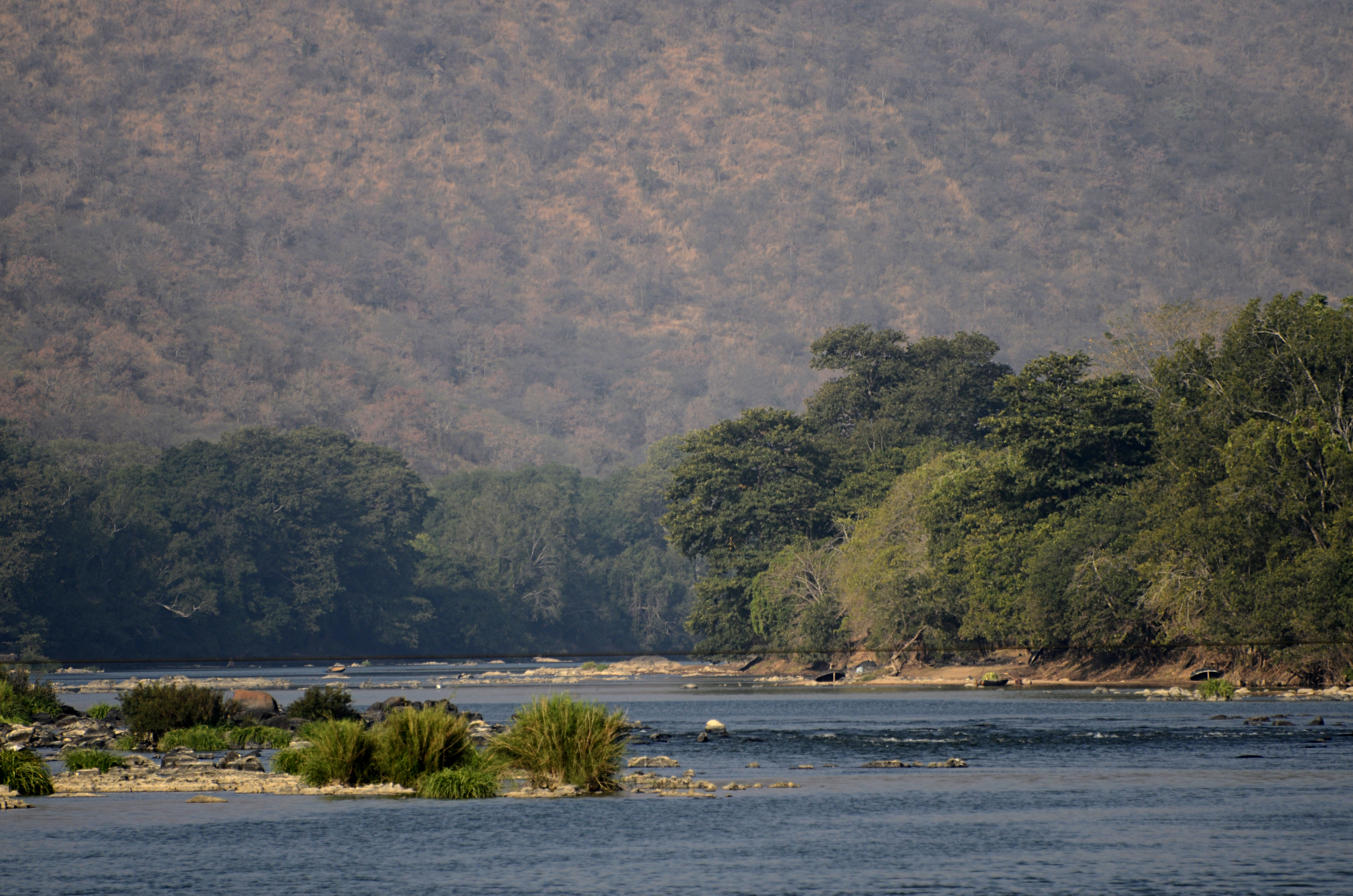
- Kaveri river flowing near Biligundlu
- Nickname: Billgundala
- Interactive map of Biligundlu
- Coordinates: 12.186°N 77.7316°E
- Country: India
- State: Tamil Nadu
- District: Krishnagiri

Languages
  - Official: Tamil
- Time zone: UTC+5:30 (IST)

Biligundlu, also known as Thiruvillikuntru, is a small village in the Bank of Kaveri. There is a water measuring station, set up by the Central Water Commission at Biligundlu (inter-State border) in Krishnagiri district of Tamil Nadu.
