= St. Francis Xavier Church, Kovilur =

Roman Catholic Church in Tamil Nadu, India

St. Francis Xavier Church
- புனித சவேரியார் ஆலயம்
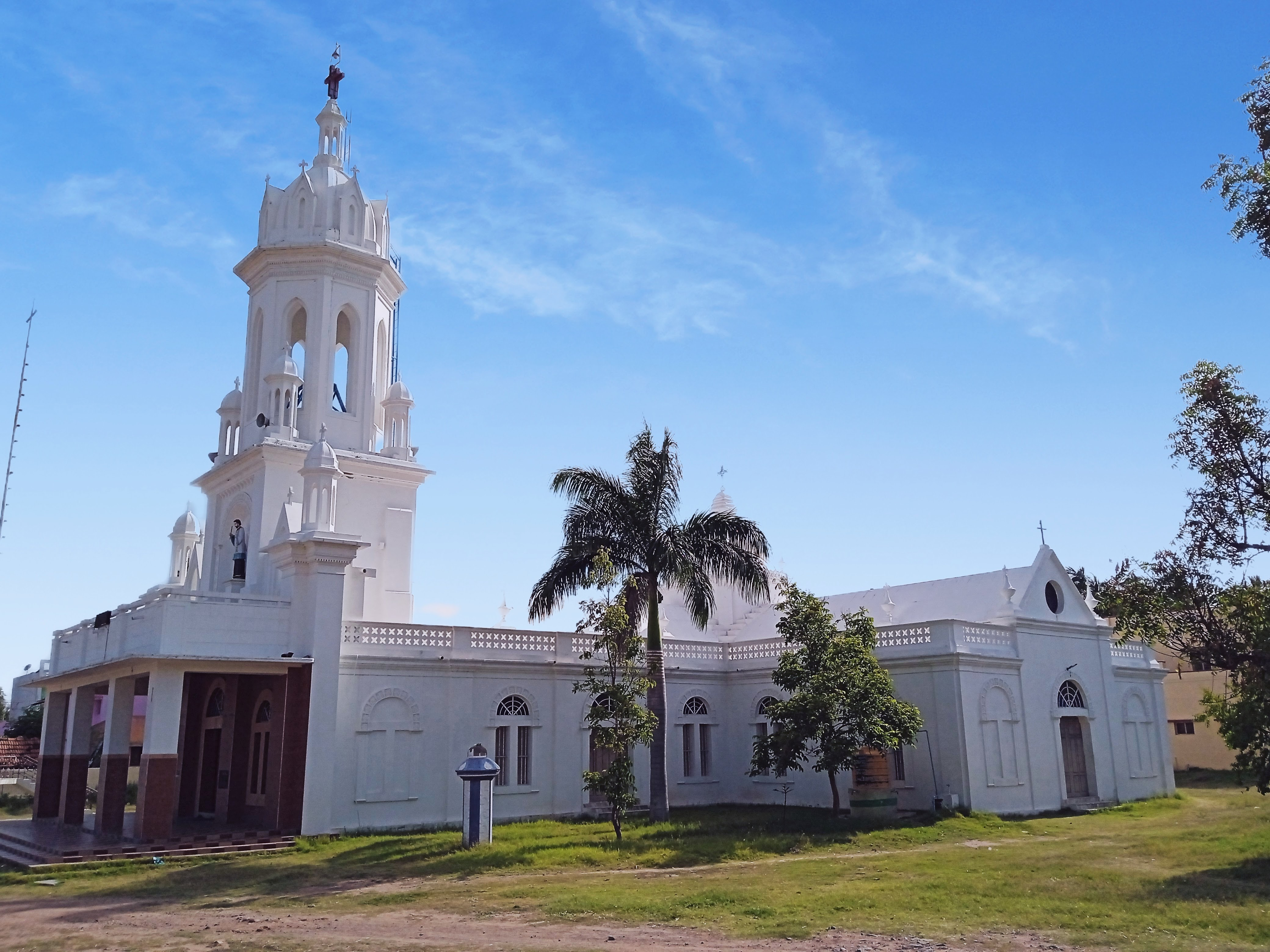
- Side View of the church
- St. Francis Xavier Church
- 12.0599675°N 78.1237831°E
- Location: Kovilur, Nallampalli, Dharmapuri, Tamil Nadu
- Country: India
- Denomination: Catholic
- Religious institute: Jesuit

History
- Status: Parish church
- Founded: 1897
- Founder(s): Fr. Surrel & Fr.Priez
- Dedication: Francis Xavier

Architecture
- Functional status: Active
- Architectural type: Church
- Style: Medieval
- Groundbreaking: 1897
- Completed: 1912

Administration
- District: Dharmapuri
- Archdiocese: Pondicherry and Cuddalore
- Diocese: Dharmapuri
- Deanery: Dharmapuri
- Parish: Kovilur

Clergy
- Archbishop: Francis Kalist
- Bishop: Lawrence Pius Dorairaj
- Priest: Fr. Arockia James

The Saint Francis Xavier Church in Kovilur, Dharamapuri is the oldest parish church in the diocese. It is called the mother church and the first Parish in the entire diocese. This church has been in service over 100 years, but over 300 years catholic and priests where present in this village. Now this church is serving under the Dharamapuri Diocese.

== History ==
By the time of Mysore missionaries, this village was known as Bellagoundanahalli and Velliyan Pettai, but after the church was set up, villagers began to call it Kolvilur. Since from 1704 priests from Society of Jesus where settled in this village and started holy services. A small chapel was built here during the 1720s and was maintained by a Jesuit priest for over 100 years. Since the 1830s M.E.P priests have been taking care of this church services since then Fr. Abbe Dubois and Fr. Mark Arokiyanadhar have been working here as priests since then around 28 Paris (MEP) priests have worked here.

Kovilur was remarkably improved in hospitality and in primary education during Fr. Thirion Francis Joseph's 29-year period serving this parish (between 1856 and 1885). As a result of the food crisis in southern India in 1847, Fr. Thirion helped many people around Bommidi and Mallapuram, making many people convert to Catholicism. Franciscan Missionary Sisters of the Immaculate Heart of Mary (FIHM) convent was built in 1864 and started the mission. The St. Thomas primary school for girls was completed in 1867. The school was upgraded to a higher secondary school in 1999. In 1871, a school for boys was completed not this is serving as St. John's Higher Sec School.

Around 1820s Catholics from Koviloor, Tirupattur (different village) settled in the nearby village of Poolapatti. In Kovilur, half of the Catholics were from nearby village Savur and Sowkarpet. Sowkarpet vanished between 1880 and 1890 because the villagers had left the village and moved to Kolar Gold Fields as mining workers.

Fr. Surrel initiated construction of this church in 1897 and then the construction was continued by the next parish priest, Fr. Perez, who completed the construction. Fr. Perez painted the interior of this church with bible art work, and on September 11, 1912, this church was opened to the public. The tower of this church was additionally constructed in 1962 by Father Paul Thalat, and this gives the church a grand look.

The Nirmala Clinical Hospital was started in 1972 by the French woman Dennis, and from 1974 it has been under the care of the Missionary Sisters of Our Lady of the Apostles(SRA). After 100 years this church was renovated in 2012 still serving to local catholic.

Two priests Joseph-Isidore Godelle and Melchior de Marion Brésillac, who served in this church became bishops of Coimbatore and Pondicherry, respectively.

== See also ==
- Kovilur, Dharamapuri
- Roman Catholic Diocese of Dharmapuri
- Queen of Angels Church, Kadagathur
- Our Lady of Mount Carmel Church, B Pallipatti
