= Kelamangalam =

- town
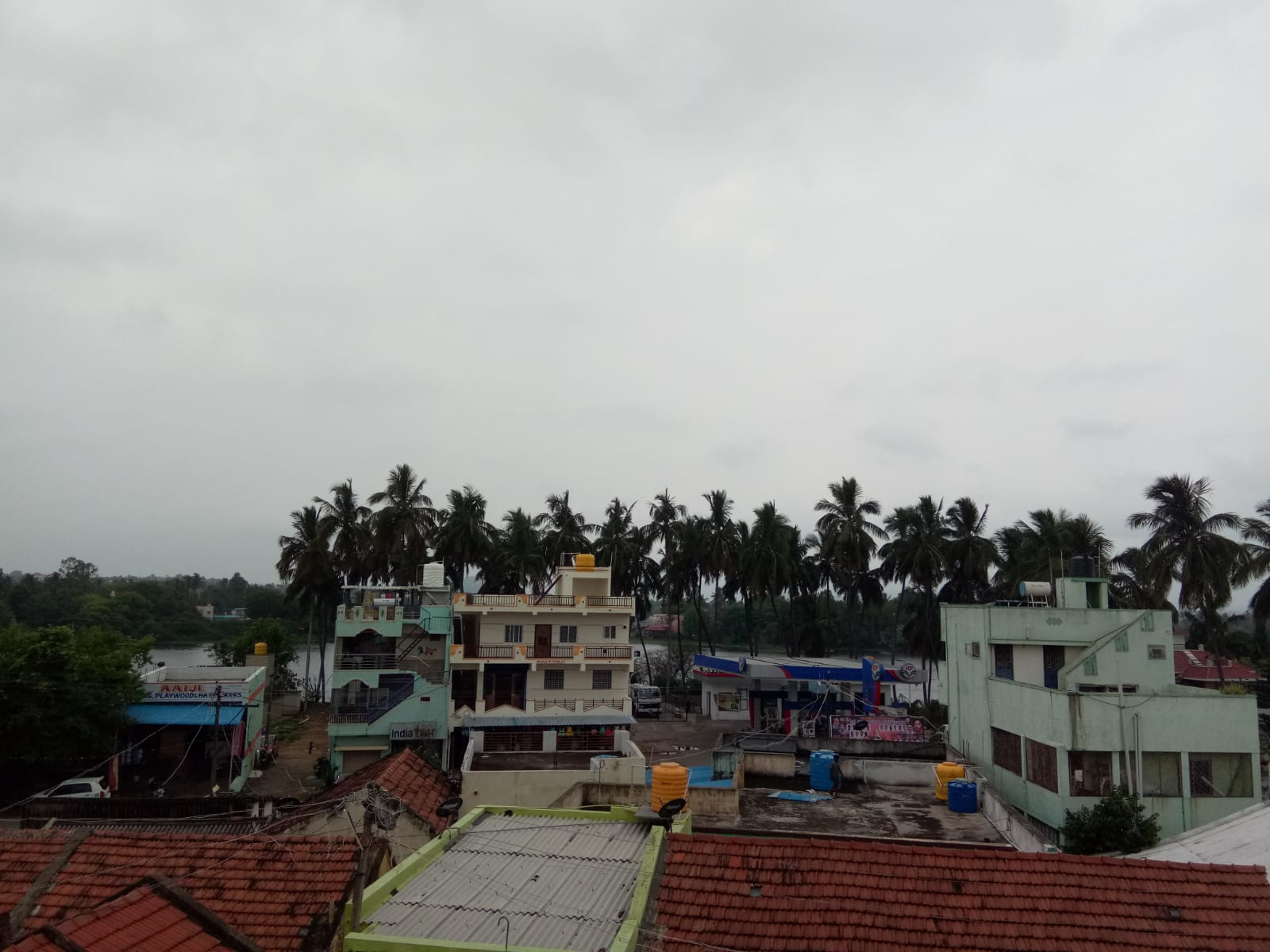

- Location in Tamil Nadu, India
- Coordinates: 12.6°N 77.85°E
- Country: India
- State: Tamil Nadu
- Region: Kongu Nadu
- District: Krishnagiri
- Elevation: 810 m (2,660 ft)

Population (2001)
  - Total: 10,994

Languages
  - Official: Tamil
- Time zone: UTC+5:30 (IST)
- Vehicle registration: TN-70

Kelamangalam is a panchayat town in Krishnagiri district in the Indian state of Tamil Nadu.

== Geography ==
Kelamangalam is located at 12.6°N 77.85°E. It has an average elevation of 810 metres (2657 feet). Average temperature lingers around 20-25 °C. The soil here is laterite.

== Demographics ==
As of 2011 India census, Kelamangalam had a population of 11,052. Males constitute 51% of the population and females 49%. Kelamangalam has an average literacy rate of 61%, higher than the national average of 59.5%: male literacy is 67%, and female literacy is 55%. In Kelamangalam, 15% of the population is under 6 years of age.
