= Denkanikottai =

Denkanikottai Thenkanikottai
- Town
- Thenkanikottai
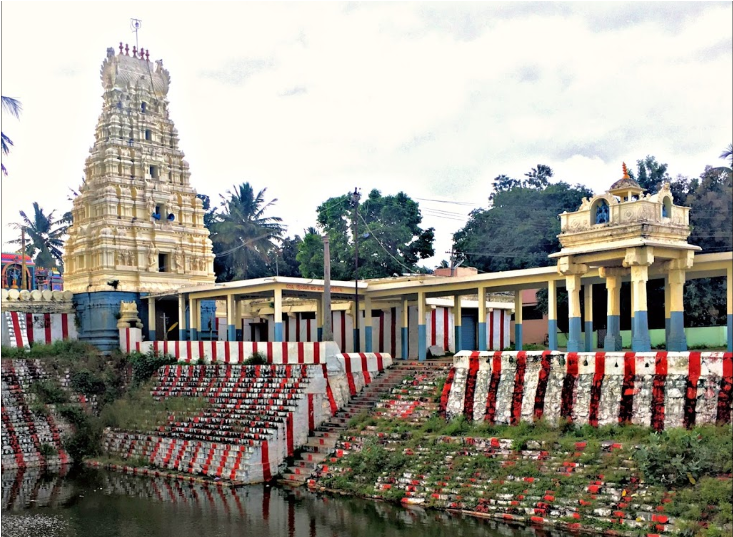
- Betrayswamy Temple, Denkanikottai
- Nickname: The Little England
- Location in Tamil Nadu, India Denkanikottai (India)
- Coordinates: 12°31′36″N 77°47′34″E
- India: India
- Tamil Nadu: Tamil Nadu
- Region: Kongu Nadu
- District: Krishnagiri

Government
  - Type: Town Panchayat
  - Body: Denkanikottai Town Panchayat

Area
  - Total: 14 km^{2} (5.4 sq mi)
- Elevation: 879 m (2,884 ft)

Population (2015)
  - Total: 31,868
  - Density: 1,702/km^{2} (4,410/sq mi)
- Time zone: UTC+5:30 (IST)
- PIN: 635107
- Telephone code: 04347
- Vehicle registration: TN-70
- Website: townpanchayat.in/denkanikottai

Denkanikottai also known as Thenkanikottai is a Panchayat Town in Krishnagiri district in the state of Tamil Nadu, India. It is the headquarters of Denkanikottai Taluk. Its altitude 879 m (2,884 ft) elevation above the sea level. It is a multicultural town with a mix of linguistic groups. Tamil is the official and spoken language. There are a significant number of Kannada, Urdu and Telugu and speakers in the town as it is very near to Karnataka State bordering it. The place is named after the legend of Betrayaswamy Temple located in the centre of the town.

== History ==
Until 1654 A.D., Denkanikottai was ruled by Kantheerava Narasaraja Wodeyar of Srirangapattana, Kingdom of Mysore The territory later moved into the hands of Hyder Ali. Later it was part of the struggle between the British and Hyder.

== Geography ==
Denkanikottai is located at 12°31'11"N 77°46'48"E. It is situated on the south-western extreme of the Deccan Plateau, East of the Western Ghats. The forest area of Denkanikottai forms the prime elephant habitat in the district. It is part of the Cauvery Elephant Reserve a part of the Cauvery Wildlife Sanctuary (450 km^{2}). It has dry but pleasant weather conditions throughout the year. Its elevation is 3,000 feet (879 m) above the sea level. Here the Hill allowance is allowed for the Central Government employees.

== Climate ==
The climate in denkanikottai is tropical. In winter, there is much less rainfall in Denkanikotta than in summer. According to Köppen and Geiger, this climate is classified as Aw. The temperature here averages 24.0 °C. Precipitation here averages 877 mm. The driest month is January, with 4 mm of rain. With an average of 202 mm, the most precipitation falls in October. April is the warmest month of the year where the temperature in April averages 27.3 °C to 33.7 °C. December has the lowest average temperature of the year where it is 15 °C to 20.9 °C.

Climate data for Denkanikottai
Month	Jan	Feb	Mar	Apr	May	Jun	Jul	Aug	Sep	Oct	Nov	Dec	Year
Average max °C	27.4	30.2	32.8	33.7	33.1	30.1	28.4	28.5	28.8	28.1	26.9	26.3	29.52
Average low °C	15	16.2	18.5	21	21.3	20.3	19.6	19.6	19.3	19.1	17.3	15.5	18.55
Average rainfall mm (inches)	4	4	9	48	119	60	88	109	142	202	69	23	N/A
Source: en.climate-data.org,

== Demographics ==
As of 2015 India census, Denkanikottai had a population of 31,868. Males constitute 52% of the population and females 48%. Denkanikottai city is divided into 18 wards for which elections are held every 5 years. The Denkanikottai Town Panchayat has population of 31868 of which 16,325 are males while 15,543 are females as per report released by Census India 2015. The population of children aged 0-6 is 2986 which is 12.31% of total population of Denkanikottai (TP). In Denkanikottai Town Panchayat, the female sex ratio is 968 against state average of 996. Moreover, the child sex ratio in Denkanikottai is around 912 compared to Tamil Nadu state average of 943. The literacy rate of Denkanikottai city is 79.83% lower than state average of 80.09%. In Denkanikottai, male literacy is around 83.05% while the female literacy rate is 73.47%.Denkanikottai Town Panchayat has total administration over 5,393 houses to which it supplies basic amenities like water and sewerage. It is also authorize to build roads within Town Panchayat limits and impose taxes on properties coming under its jurisdiction. It was once primarily inhabited by the Irula tribes. The size of this taluk is bigger than Kanyakumari district.

== Economy ==
The economy of Denkanikottai is primarily dependent on business. It is also an agrarian economy depending on the agricultural output of surrounding villages in its taluk. Crops consist of tomatoes, cabbages, onions, mangoes, capsicum, carrot, cucumber, beans, coriander leaves, turnip and radish. In July 2019, the government announced the construction of an international flower auction centre with quality control laboratory, cold storage facility, administrative building and an electronic auction hall at a cost of ₹ 202 million. It will deal with flowers cultivated on 3,702 hectares in the district, which are also exported to Australia, Singapore, and Malaysia.

== Tourism ==
The climatic condition in this area resembles the UK Climate, hence nearby place Thally called as "Little England". Due to its climate and the presence of religious places tourism is also a source of revenue. Tourist sites include the Betrayswamy Temple, along with Yaarab Baba Dargah whose minarets resemble the Haji Ali Dargah of Mumbai, and the Little Flower Church. People from across the state and the neighboring states visit here for pilgrimage.

== Places of Interest ==
- BeterayaSwamyTemple
- Gavi Narashima Swamy Temple
- Panchapalli Dam
- Shivan kovil
- Yarab Dargah
- Bettamugilalam Elephant Forest
- Aiyur Reserve Forest
- Hogenakkal Water Falls(60 km)
- Melagiri Hills
- Little Flower Church
- Cauvery Elephant Reserve
- Bavanathham mountain
