= Denkanikottai taluk =

Township in Tamil Nadu, India

Denkanikottai Taluk
- Taluk
- Location in Tamil Nadu, India
- Coordinates: 12.52°N 77.78°E
- Country: India
- State: Tamil Nadu
- District: Krishnagiri

Population (2011)
  - Total: 345,668

Languages
  - Official: Tamil
- Time zone: UTC+5:30 (IST)
- PIN: 635 107
- Telephone code: (91)4347
- Vehicle registration: TN-24

Thenkanikottai taluk, also known as Denkanikottai, is a taluk of Krishnagiri district of the Indian state of Tamil Nadu. The headquarters is the town of Denkanikottai. Important places of visit in Thenkanikottai are Yarab Dargah, Bettraya Swamy temple and Little Flower Church. Also The climatic condition in this area resembles the UK Climate, hence nearby place Thally called as "Little England".

== Demographics ==
According to the 2011 census, the taluk of Denkanikottai taluk had a population of 3,45,668 with 1,78,331 males and 1,67,337 females. There were 938 women for every 1,000 men. The taluk had a literacy rate of 57.53%. Child population in the age group below 6 years were 19,219 Males and 17,721 Females.

== Places of interest ==
- BeterayaSwamyTemple
- Gavi Narashima Swamy Temple
- Panchapalli Dam
- Shivan kovil
- Yarab Dargah
- Bettamugilalam Elephant Forest
- Aiyur Reserve Forest
- Hogenakkal Water Falls(60 km)
- Melagiri Hills
- Little Flower Church
- Cauvery Elephant Reserve
- Thally(The Little England)
- Rayakottai Fort

== Villages and settlements ==
- Kodiyalam
