= Thally =

Town and revenue block in Tamil Nadu, India

Thally Thali
- Town
- Nickname: Little England
- Location in Tamil Nadu, India
- Coordinates: 12.584624°N 77.654434°E
- Country: India
- State: Tamil Nadu
- Region: Kongu Nadu
- District: Krishnagiri district
- Time zone: UTC+5:30 (IST)
- PIN: 635118
- Telephone code: 04347
- Vehicle registration: TN-70

Thally is a town near Kurubarapally Village in Thally Taluk, Krishnagiri district of Tamil Nadu, India. It is "Little England" named so by the British during their regime mostly due to its cool weather. In Thally block total of 50 Panchayat village.

Thally is identified as the backward block in the district due to its hilly nature, poor infrastructure and the socio-economic background of its population. The area was affected by Naxals until 1990 which hindered the progress of the block. Thalli region is now Naxal free. Industries have started coming to Thally block since 1991.

The nearest major town is Hosur. The chairman for (2020–present) of Thally block is V. Srinivasalu Reddy. The current MLA for Thally constituency (2016) is Y. Prakash

This village is located in Tamil Nadu at the Karnataka border. Even though this village belongs to Tamil Nadu, people speak Kannada here as the natives are Kannadigas. Anekal and Kanakapura are the nearest towns.

It is one of the most beautiful landscaped areas. Most people are involved in agriculture. It is famous for politics. Ex-MLAs of the constituency are S. Raja Reddy, and at present (2021) T Ramachandran.
