= A. Chellakumar =

Indian politician

Member of Parliament, Lok Sabha
- In office 23 May 2019 – 4 June 2024
- Preceded by: K. Ashok Kumar
- Constituency: Krishnagiri

Member of Tamil Nadu Legislative Assembly
- In office 10 May 1996 – 14 May 2001
- Constituency: Thiyagarayanagar

AICC Incharge for Meghalya PCC, Mizoram PCC, Arunachal PCC
- Incumbent
- Assumed office 24 December 2023

Personal details
- Party: Indian National Congress; Tamil Maanila Congress (Moopanar)

Dr. A. Chellakumar is an Indian politician and Member of parliament. He was elected to the Tamil Nadu Legislative Assembly as an Indian National Congress (INC) candidate from Anna Nagar constituency in the 1991 election and as a Tamil Maanila Congress (Moopanar) candidate from T. Nagar constituency in the 1996 election. He was unsuccessful in winning the Villivakkam constituency in 2001. In the 2011 election he attempted once again to gain the T. Nagar seat. His candidacy in 2001 was as a TMC(M) member and in 2011 it was for the INC. He was runner-up on both occasions.

Although he had joined the TMC(M) breakaway group in 1996 when factionalism beset the INC due to a decision to ally with the All Indian Anna Dravida Munnetra Kazhagam in the state, Chellakumar subsequently fell out with TMC(M) founder G. K. Moopanar. His career then stalled for some years until, seen as a neutral figure with the INC, into which the TMC(M) had re-merged, he was one of three people appointed as a secretary to the Tamil Nadu All India Congress Committee in 2013.

Chellakumar unsuccessfully contested the Krishnagiri Lok Sabha constituency for the INC in the 2014 elections for the Parliament of India, where he finished in a distant fourth place. A major reorganisation of the INC was thought to be necessary following its worst-ever defeat in those elections and as part of that process Chellakumar replaced Digvijaya Singh in April 2017 as the person in charge of the party's affairs in Goa. He was considered at that time to be close to Rahul Gandhi, the son of party president Sonia Gandhi and vice president of party. In the 2019 elections, he contested again from the Krishnagiri constituency and was elected as a member of Parliament. He is highly known for his simplicity and connectivity with poor people. He is more popularly called 'Doctor' by people.

== Electoral performance ==
=== Legislative Assembly ===
Year	Constituency	Party	Votes	%	Opponent	Party	Votes	%	Result	Margin	%
2026	Krishnagiri	INC	59,597	25.89	P. Mukundhan	TVK	89,374	38.83	Lost	-29,777	-12.94
2011	T. Nagar	INC	43,421	33.46	V. P. Kalairajan	ADMK	75,883	58.48	Lost	-32,462	-25.02
2001	Villivakkam	TMC	1,55,557	45.51	D. Napoleon	DMK	1,64,787	48.21	Lost	-9,230	-2.70
1996	T. Nagar	TMC	76,461	67.16	S. Vijayan	ADMK	27,463	24.12	Won	+48,998	+43.04
1991	Anna Nagar	INC	75,512	57.29	S. M. Ramachandran	DMK	48,214	36.58	Won	+27,298	+20.71

=== Lok Sabha ===
Year	Constituency	Party	Votes	%	Opponent	Party	Votes	%	Result	Margin	%
2019	Krishnagiri	INC	6,11,298	52.60	K. P. Munusamy	ADMK	4,54,533	39.11	Won	+1,56,765	+13.49
2014	Krishnagiri	INC	38,885	3.64	K. Ashok Kumar	ADMK	4,80,491	44.93	Lost	-4,41,606	-41.29
