= St. Joseph Church, Kathanpallam =

Roman Catholic Church in Tamil Nadu, India

St. Joseph Church
- புனித சூசையப்பர் ஆலயம்
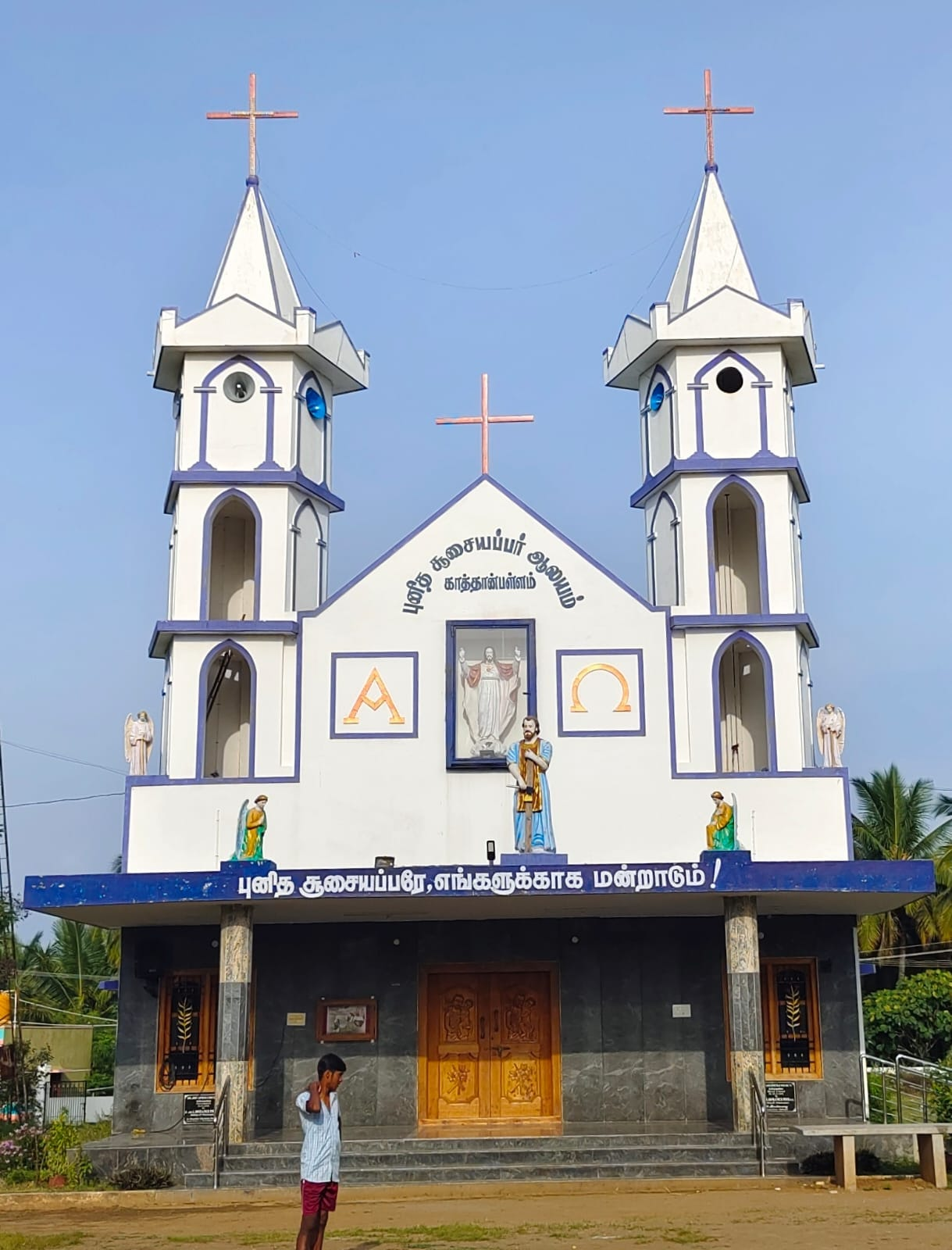
- Front View of this church
- St. Joseph Church
- 12.5405°N 78.2933°E
- Location: Kathanpallam, Krishnagiri district, Tamil Nadu
- Country: India
- Denomination: Catholic
- Religious institute: Jesuit

History
- Status: Parish
- Founded: 1997
- Dedication: Saint Joseph

Architecture
- Functional status: Active
- Architectural type: Church
- Style: Modern Architecture
- Groundbreaking: 2013
- Completed: 2015

Administration
- Archdiocese: Pondicherry and Cuddalore
- Diocese: Dharmapuri
- Deanery: Krishnagiri
- Parish: Kathanpallam

Clergy
- Archbishop: Francis Kalist
- Bishop: Lawrence Pius Dorairaj
- Priest: Fr. S. Jesudass

The St. Joseph Church is a Roman Catholic parish church located in the heart of Kathanpallam village in Krishnagiri district, Tamil Nadu, India. This church comes under the administration of the Dhramapuri Diocese.

== History ==
After 1820 CE, Catholic migrants who settled in Elathagiri also established communities in nearby villages such as Kandikuppam, Kathanpallam, Sunadampatti, Surangottai, Achamangalam, and Pushpagiri. Families like Bappu, Naduveedhi, and Maniam settled in Kathanpallam. Over time, intermarriages with Keerakathi, Thottam, Nesavu, and Sepoy families led to the formation of around 150 Catholic families in this village.

Until 1937, deceased Catholics from Katanpallam were interred in the Elathagiri cemetery. However, in 1937, due to a flood, people were unable to cross the river to reach the Elathagiri cemetery. As a result, burials began in Kathanpallam, eventually leading to the establishment of a cemetery in their village itself.

In 1995, the Sisters of Gonzaga acquired land in Kathanpallam to build a convent, school, and college. During this period, Fr. M. Arulsamy, the Elathagiri Parish Priest, procured 1.7 acres of land from the Bappu Family to construct a church. The land originally belonged to their late uncle, Soosai (Sepoy), who left it to his nephews. The nephews donated the land for the church, and requested to name the church in honor of St. Joseph, also known as Soosai.

In 1997, Fr. M. Arulsamy laid the foundation for a chapel in Kathanpallam, which was later completed by Fr. M. Jegaraj. Former Bishop Joseph Anthony Irudayaraj blessed and inaugurated the chapel on February 13, 1999. Weekly Wednesday masses were conducted by Elathagiri Parish priests in the chapel, and from 2010 onwards, Sunday masses were also held there.

Due to the limited space in the existing chapel, Bishop Lawrence Pius approved the construction of a new church in Kathanpallam. The groundbreaking for this church took place in February 2013 under the guidance of Fr. A. Soosairaj, and construction was completed with the support of villagers and Fr. J. Arokiyasamy. This church was blessed and inaugurated by Dharamapuri Bishop Lawrence Pius on December 23, 2015. In May 2017, this sub-station church gained independence from Elathagiri Parish and was elevated to a Parish church. Fr. Martin became the first parish priest in 2018.

The Franciscan Sisters of St. Aloysius Gonzaga established their convent in Kathanpallam in 1998. In 2009, they founded Gonzaga Arts & Science College for Women and Gonzaga Primary School. Over the years, the primary school was upgraded to a higher secondary school. Renowned for its academic excellence and quality education, the institutions gained popularity in the area.

== See also ==
- Our Lady Of Refuge Church, Elathagiri
- Vinnarasi Madha Church, Kandikuppam
