= Our Lady of Mount Carmel Church, Nellimarathupatti =

Roman Catholic Church in Tamil Nadu, India

Lady of Mount Carmel Church
- Lady of Mt. Carmel Church
- கார்மேல் அன்னை ஆலயம்
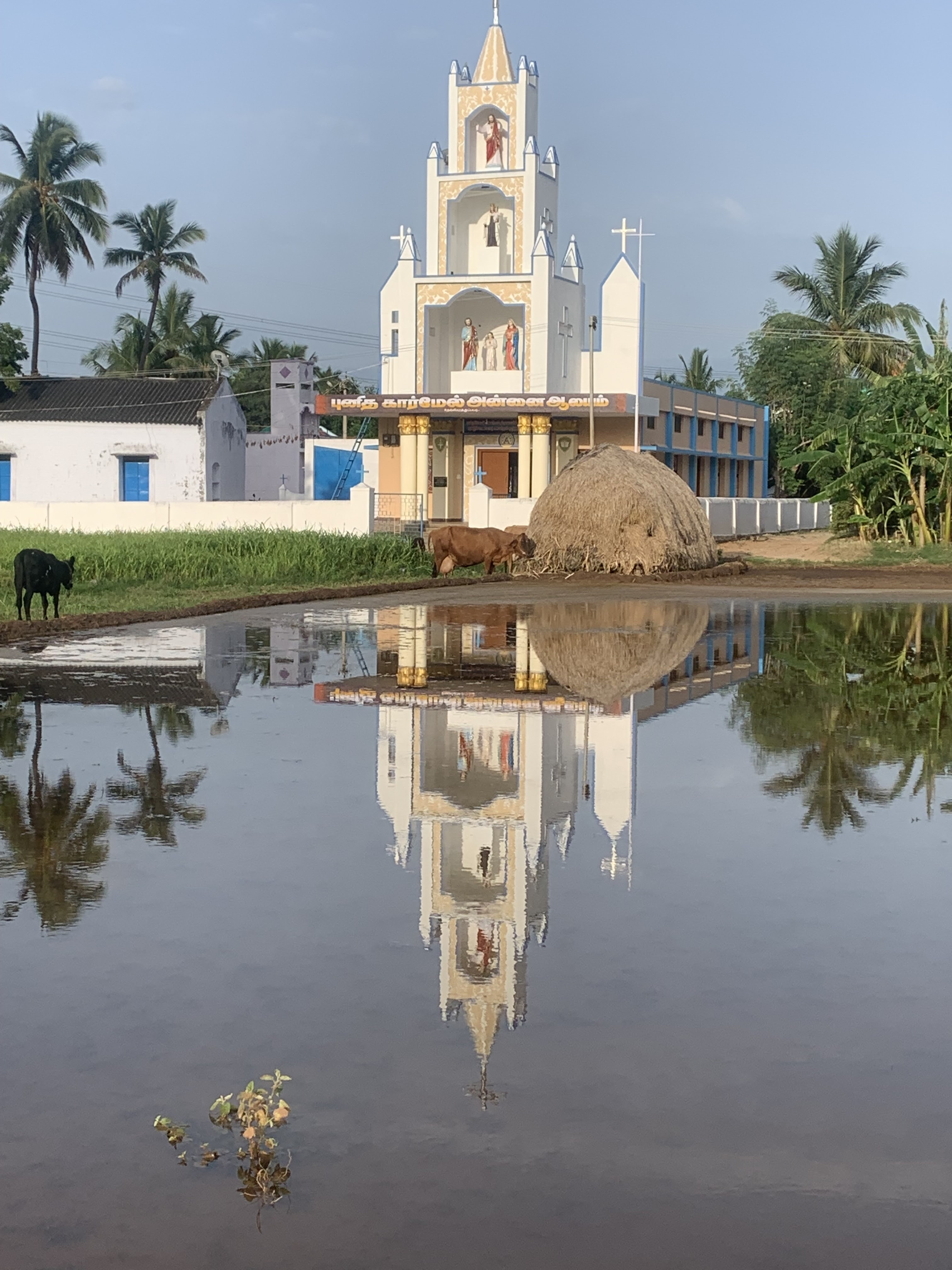
- Side view of this church
- Lady of Mount Carmel Church
- 12.2198842°N 78.3296993°E
- Location: Nellimarathupatti, Kelavalli, Kambainallur, Dharamapuri, Tamil Nadu
- Country: India
- Denomination: Catholic
- Religious order: Jesuit

History
- Status: Parish church
- Founded: 2001
- Founder: Fr. Chevalier
- Dedication: St. Mary

Architecture
- Functional status: Active
- Architectural type: Church
- Style: Modern Architecture
- Groundbreaking: 2000
- Completed: October 29, 2001

Administration
- Archdiocese: Pondicherry and Cuddalore
- Diocese: Dharmapuri
- Deanery: Dharmapuri
- Parish: Nellimarathupatti

Clergy
- Archbishop: Francis Kalist
- Bishop: Lawrence Pius Dorairaj
- Priest: Fr. Savariappan

Our Lady of Mount Carmel is a Roman Catholic church in Nellimarathupatti village, Tamil Nadu, India. This Church serves under Dharamapuri Diocese.

== History ==
According to records from 1774, Christians lived between from North Kelavalli to South Kambainallur village, with farming as their major profession. In the 18th century, the area south of the Ponnaiyar River banks was known as "Nadutheru," now called Kongrapatti, and the region further south was called "Keeltheru", presently located in Kelavalli and Nellimarathupatti. The village headman of Keeltheru took the Christians land and provided them with new land, which is now known as Nellimarathupatti. Subsequently, the Christians built a new chapel in this village.

Fr. Chevalier, affectionately known as "Chappathi Mulli Samiyar" by the locals, constructed a room and resided in this village, continuing his preaching. The Soosai family and the Yesuvadiyan family were among the early Christian families residing in this village. However, due to water scarcity and the inability to sustain farming, they left the village and resettled in Elathagiri and Edappadi. During that time, the northern side of the Ponnaiyar River was referred to as "Meltheru", and the primary source of income for the villages was weaving. Around 1833, weavers from Poonamallee, Muthialpettai, Salem, and Elathagiri established settlements near Kambainallur, while some Christians settled in Nellimarathupatti.

In 1838, Fr. Prico had numerous assistants, and one of them, Fr. Mario Thebericiyak, recorded in his diary that he conducted missionary work in Nellimarathupatti for several days. Between 1845 and 1853, Fr. Gyon Magimainathar settled in Kambainallur to provide medical services and often visited Nellimarathupatti for preaching purposes. In subsequent years, this chapel received pastoral care from Elathagiri and Dharmapuri parishes.

On October 29, 2001, a new church named Mary Mt. Carmel was constructed adjacent to the old chapel, and it was inaugurated by Bishop Joseph Anthony Irudayaraj of Dharmapuri. It continued to function as a substation of Elathagiri and Dharmapuri Parish. Subsequently, in October 2009, the diocesan bishop elevated this church to the status of a parish church, and Fr. M. Arulsamy was appointed as its first parish priest.

Under the tenure of Fr. Albert William, this church underwent renovation and was reopened by Bishop Larewance Pius on October 7, 2021.

== Bathelamite Sisters Congregation ==
In 2009, the Bethlehemites sisters from this congregation expressed their desire to serve in this diocese and requested Bishop Joseph Antony Irudhiyaraj's permission. The bishop subsequently assigned them to Nellimarathupatti Parish and provided them with land for their services.

In 2012, the sisters established a convent school named Sacred Heart, which has since been actively involved in providing religious and educational services to this parish.

== See also ==
- Our Lady of Mount Carmel Church, B Pallipatti
- Our Lady Of Refuge Church, Elathagiri
