= Our Lady of Fatima Church, Krishnagiri =

Roman Catholic Church in Tamil Nadu, India

- R.C. Fatima Church
- பாத்திமா அன்னை திருத்தலம்
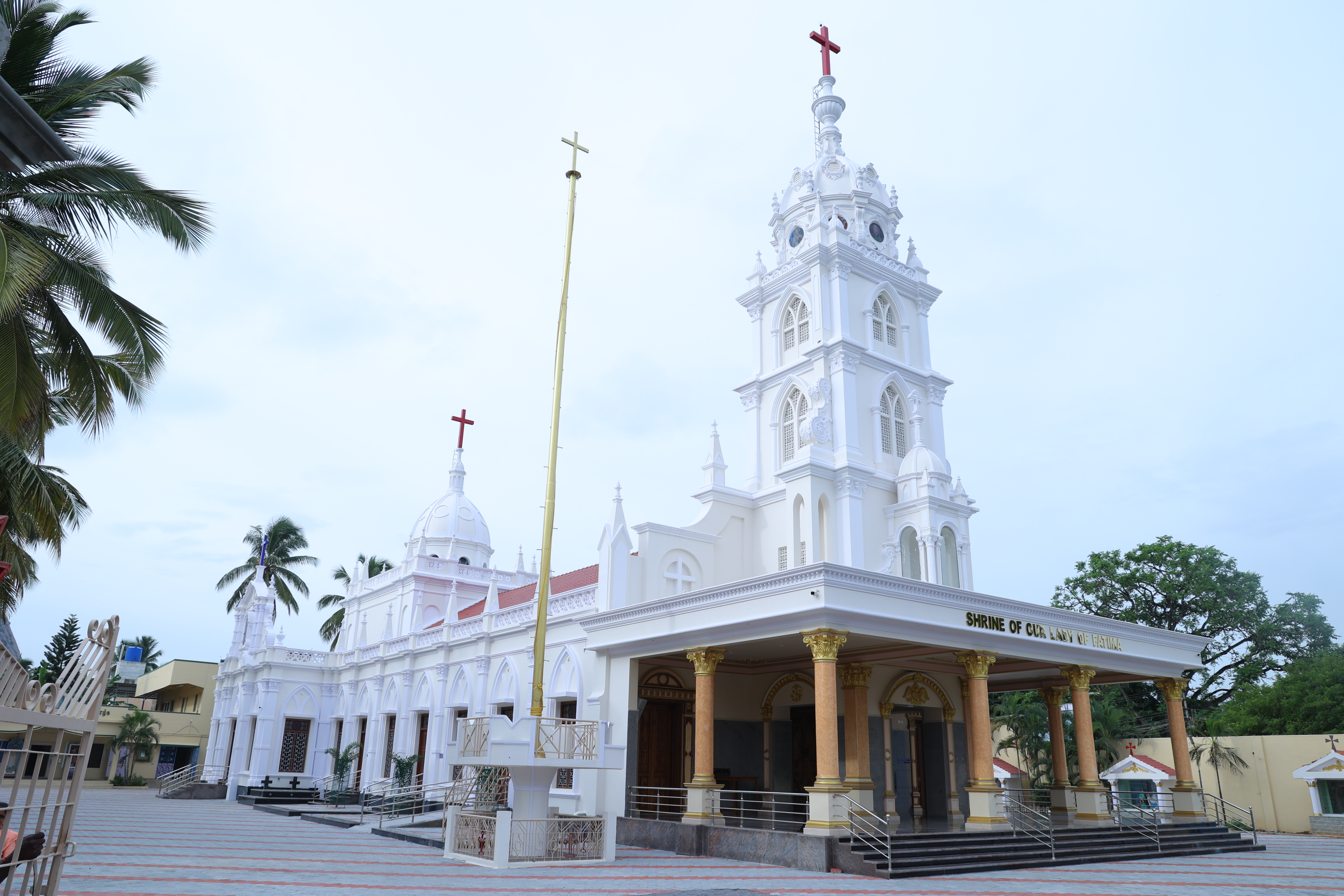
- Front View of the church
- Our Lady of Fatima Church, Krishnagiri
- 12.5256°N 78.2156°E
- Location: Krishnagiri, Tamil Nadu
- Country: India
- Denomination: Catholic
- Religious institute: Jesuit
- Website: www.fathimashrine.com

History
- Former name: R.C. Fathima Church
- Status: Parish church
- Founded: 11 September 1972
- Founder(s): Fr. Kulandhai Nadhar; Fr. Issac

Architecture
- Functional status: Active
- Architectural type: Church
- Style: Medieval
- Years built: 1972

Administration
- Archdiocese: Pondicherry and Cuddalore
- Diocese: Dharmapuri
- Deanery: Krishnagiri
- Parish: Krishnagiri

Clergy
- Archbishop: Francis Kalist
- Bishop: Lawrence Pius Dorairaj
- Priest: Fr. R. Arulraj

The Our Lady of Fatima Shrine is a Catholic church in Krishnagiri, Tamil Nadu, India, It also serves as the primary parish church for the Krishnagiri region. The construction of this church took place in 1972, primarily due to the inadequate space available at the existing Ignatius Church, situated in Oldpet, Krishnagiri. Notably, the Fatima Mary statue housed within the church originates from Fátima, Portugal.

An annual feast celebrated on the Sunday after 13 July has garnered significant renown within the town. Tamil serves as the medium of preaching in this church, effectively reaching the local congregation. Furthermore, this church is affiliated with the Dharmapuri Diocese, and this church is one of the Vicariates (Deanery) churches of its Diocese.

== History ==
Prior to the construction of Our Lady of Fatima Shrine, the St. Ignatius of Loyola church served as the parish church of Krishnagiri until 1972. This fact presents two distinct historical periods associated with these two churches in Krishnagiri.

=== History of St. Ignatius Of Loyala Church ===
During the 18th century, Krishnagiri served as the military headquarters of Bharamahal, which was a part of the Mysore Kingdom. In 1786, the British conquered Bharamahal from Tippu Sultan after the Third Anglo-Mysore War. Subsequently, Catholics from Elathagiri and Veppanahalli settled in Krishnagiri. With the assistance of British soldiers, a small chapel was constructed and named after Loyola Ignatius. During that period, the Paris M.E.P congregation was responsible for overseeing church services in Southern India, including this church, which came under the service of M.E.P priests.

After British soldiers vacated Krishnagiri in 1832, priests of Elathagiri church, conducted masses in this church. Later, a small church was built atop the British built chapel. Until 1857, Krishnagiri was part of the Tirupattur and Vellore parish. Subsequently, in 1897, Krishnagiri church became a part of Elathagiri Parish. According to the book Saruthira Surukam published by the Salem Diocese, there were approximately 50 to 60 Catholics residing in Krishnagiri during 1897.

In 1925, Rev Fr Dominic, the parish priest of Elathagiri, constructed a third church, which was used till 1972. The inaugural mass in that new church was celebrated on 17 July 1925. In 1930, the Salem Diocese was established, separating from the Kudandhai Diocese (Kumbakonam). Consequently, Krishnagiri church became a parish under the Salem Diocese, and Father Gabriel became its first Parish Priest. In response to a request from the Salem Bishop Henri Prunier, sisters from the Franciscan Servants of Mary order also called as FSM Sisters arrived in Krishnagiri and began their service in India and to this church on 29 November 1934.

Until 1972, this church was served as the parish church of Krishnagiri. After the inauguration of the new Fatima Church, the masses in this church ceased, and over time, it fell into disuse. However, in 2015, with the assistance of the Chinappa Mudiyalar family and Rev Fr Madulai Muthu, the plan to renovate this church for oldpet people. Subsequently, the church was reconstructed and reopened to the public on 13 August 2017 as a sub-station church of Krishnagiri parish. Currently, mass is conducted in this church every Monday evening at 6:30.

=== History of Our Lady of Fatima Church ===
In 1930, Rev Fr Gabriel purchased 3.04 acres of land from Rayapan Mudhilayar. By 1940, Rev Fr Washone constructed the Parish Priest House on the purchased land. As the Catholic population of Krishnagiri continued to grow during the 1950s, and due to the inadequate space available, Rev Fr Kulandhai Nadhar made plans to build a new church for Krishnagiri.

With the approval and blessings of Salem Bishop Venmani Vendhar, the construction of the church commenced, funded by public contributions and a donation from actor Chandrababu. Reverend Father Kulandhai Nadhar died suddenly on 11 March 1963. Subsequently, Rev Fr Issac undertook the responsibility of completing the construction of the church. On 11 September 1972, the first mass was celebrated in this church, following the blessing of the Salem Bishop. In 1997, with the establishment of the Dharmapuri Diocese from the Salem Diocese, this church has been serving under the jurisdiction of the Dharmapuri Diocese.

Towards the end of 2019, Parish Priest Fr Isaiyas and the church members planned to renovate the church in preparation for its 50th Year Jubilee in 2022. With the support of the public, church services were temporarily halted in early 2020 to commence the renovation work. However, due to the challenges posed by the COVID-19 pandemic, including material shortages and financial difficulties, the renovation was delayed. Eventually, after overcoming all obstacles, the church renovation was successfully completed, and the church resumed its services on 13 May 2023.

== List of Parish Priest ==
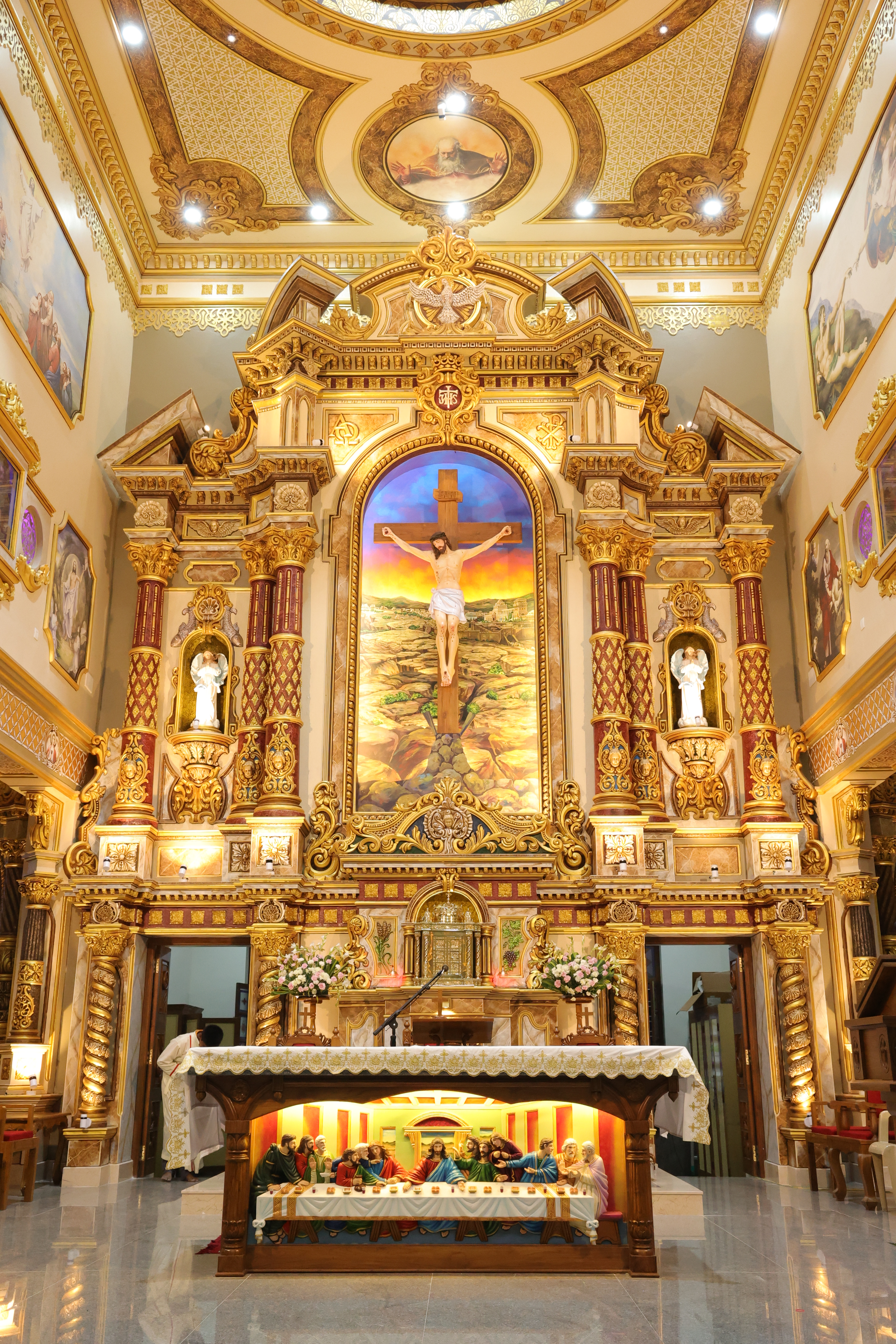
Church Interior

Served Year	Priest names
1930–1932	Rev. Fr. Gabrial Playoutst
1933–1934	Rev. Fr. Pallue
1935–1948	Rev. Fr. Harou
1936–1946	Rev. Fr. Vachone
1946–1948	Rev. Fr. Varghese Chemparathy
1946–1951	Rev. Fr. Joseph Massol
1951–1964	Rev. Fr. A. Kulandhai Nathar
1664–1975	Rev. Fr. Issac Sr.
1975–1977	Rev. Fr. A. Irudhiya Nadhar
1978–1984	Rev. Fr. M. Gnana Prakasam
1984–1986	Rev. Fr. M. Jayaraj
1986–1989	Rev. Fr. A. Joseph
1989–1994	Rev. Fr. Peter Kariethara
1994–2001	Rev. Fr. P. Xavier
2001–2006	Rev. Fr. M. Jayaraj
2006–2012	Rev. Fr. A. Madhalai Muthu
2012–2017	Rev. Fr. D. Devasagayam
2017–2020	Rev. Fr. A. Susairaj
2020–2025	Rev. Fr. S. Isaiyas
2025 – present	Rev. Fr. R. Arulraj

== Sub-Station Churches ==
Sub Station Churches
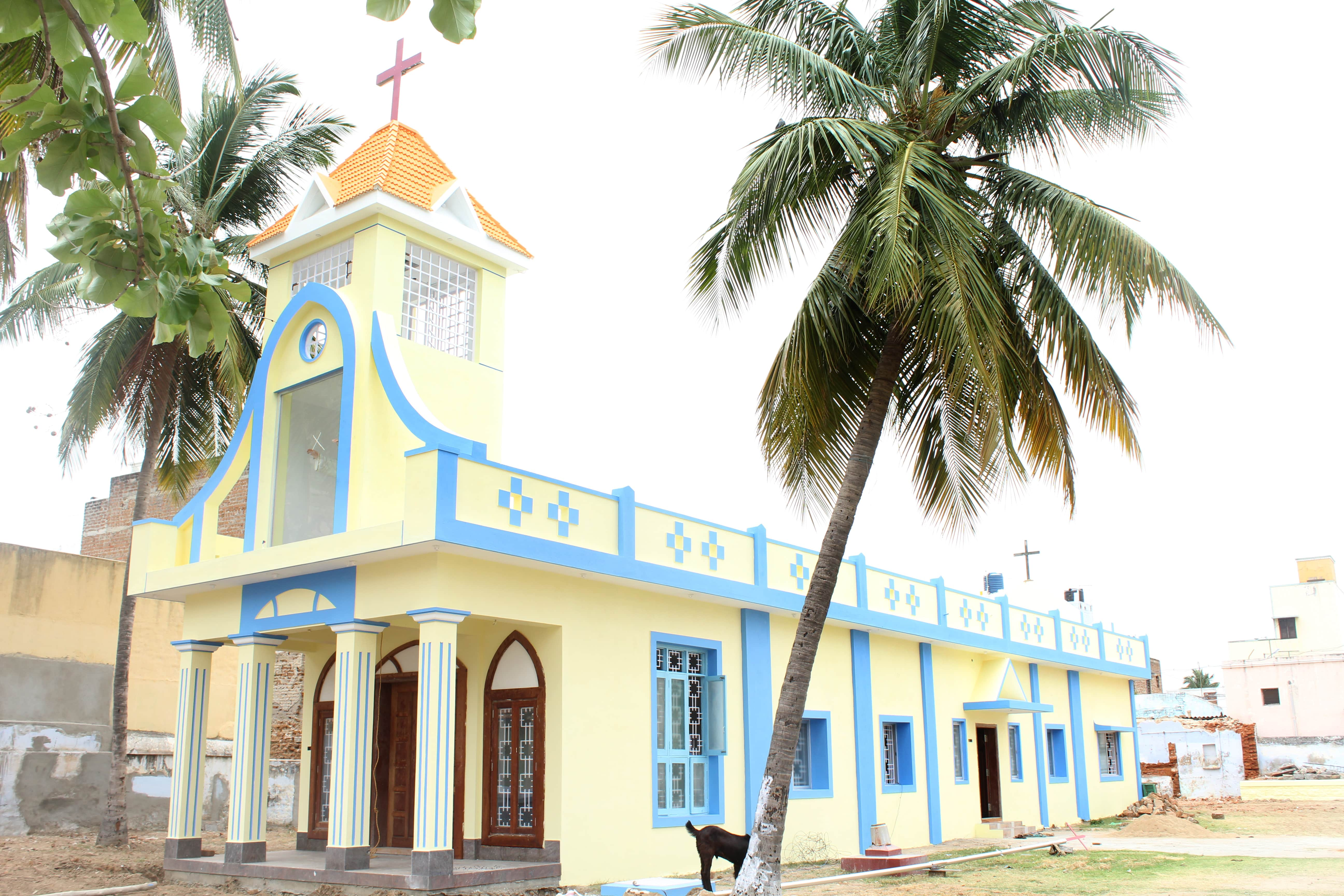
Ignatius of Loyola Church, Oldpet, Krishnagiri

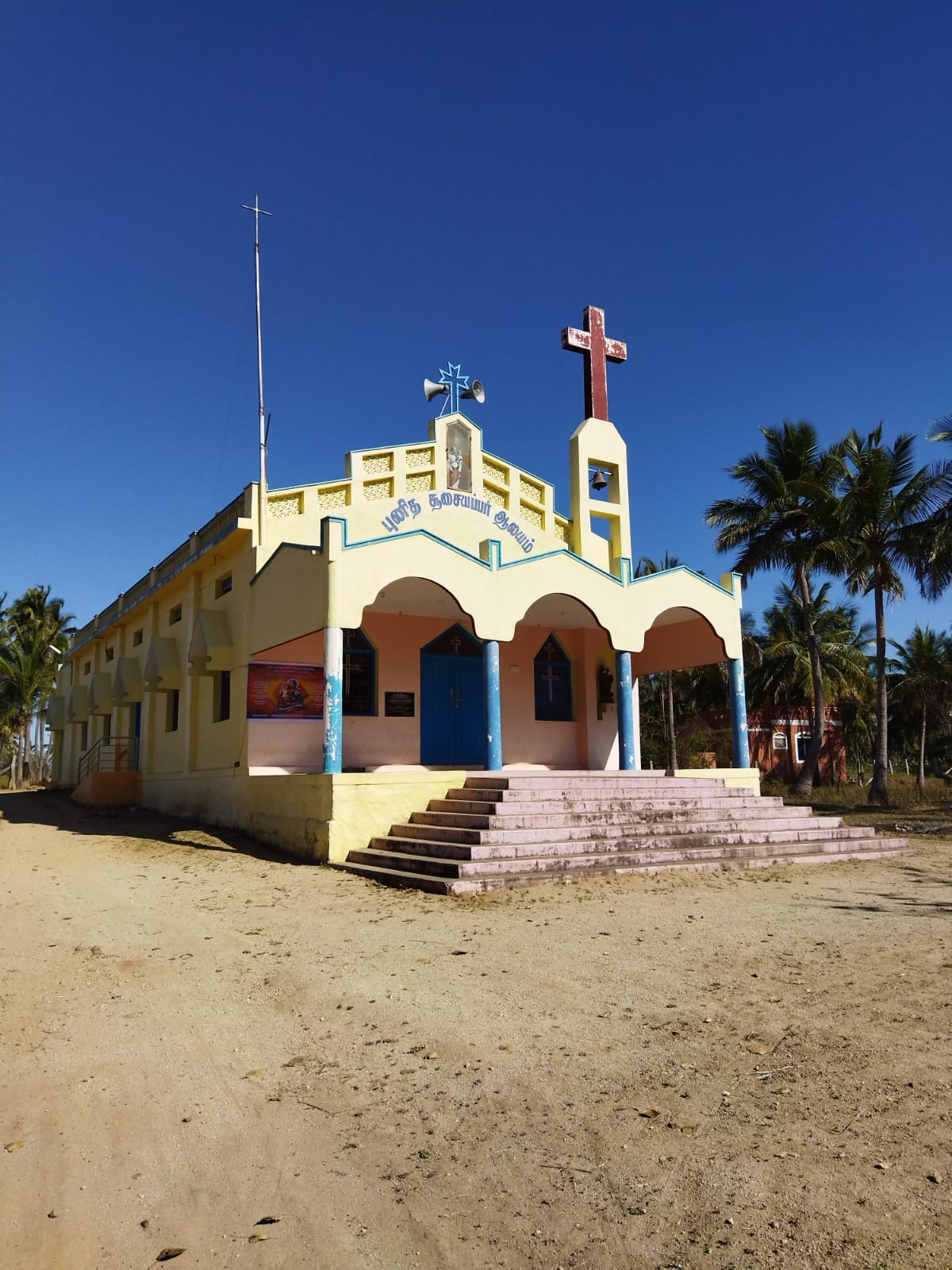
St. Joseph Church, Periearikodi, Poosaripatti

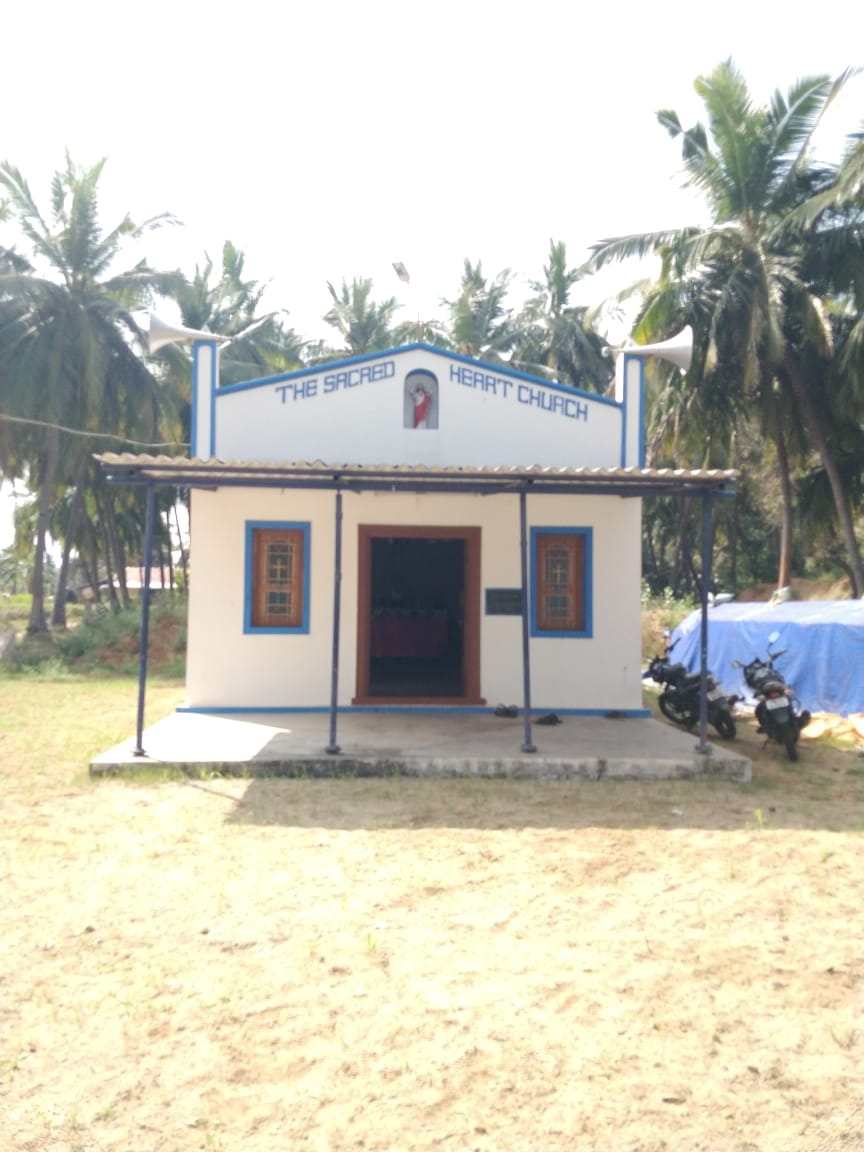
Sacred Heart Church, V.Madepalli, Veppanapalli
aultabulta

== See also ==
- Our Lady Of Refuge Church, Elathagiri
- Roman Catholic Diocese of Dharmapuri
- St. Antony's Church, Sundampatti
- Vinnarasi Madha Church, Kandikuppam
