= St. Antony's Church, Sundampatti =

Roman Catholic Church in Tamil Nadu, India

St. Antony's Church
- St. Anthony's of Padua Church
- புனித அந்தோனியார் ஆலயம்
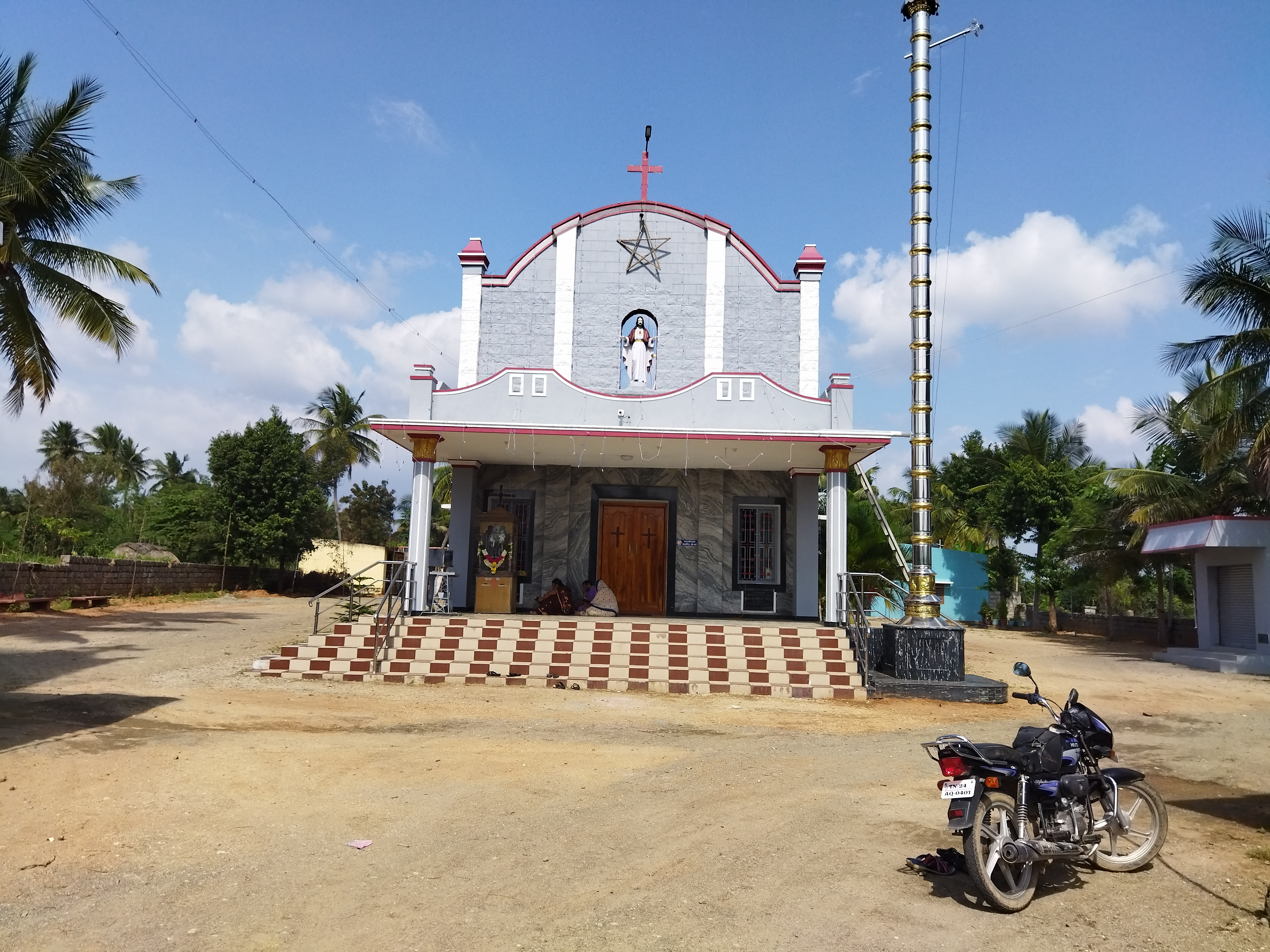
- Front View of the church
- St. Antony's Church
- 12.5364634°N 78.2694626°E
- Location: Sundampatti, Orappam, Krishnagiri, Tamil Nadu
- Country: India
- Denomination: Catholic
- Religious institute: Jesuit

History
- Status: Parish church
- Founded: 1929
- Founder(s): Fr. Ignatius & Fr. Joachim

Architecture
- Functional status: Active
- Architectural type: Church
- Style: Medieval
- Years built: 1979

Administration
- District: Krishnagiri
- Archdiocese: Pondicherry and Cuddalore
- Diocese: Dharmapuri
- Deanery: Krishnagiri
- Parish: Sundampatti

Clergy
- Archbishop: Francis Kalist
- Bishop: Lawrence Pius Dorairaj
- Priest: Fr. R. Arockiasamy

St. Antony Church, Sundampatti is a Catholic church in Sundampatti village, Krishnagiri district in the Indian state of Tamil Nadu. This church is known for its Tuesday evening mass. This parish ministers to 194 families with the members of 628. Nine Ambiyams serve under this parish. This church has provided holy services for more than 80 years.

== History ==
On 2 May 1937, Philip, the son of Susaiappan-Gnanamary who belonged to Sundampatti's family was baptized at Elthagiri Adaikala Madha Church. Later, many Catholic settlements were established in Sundampatti. Catholics settled in Sundampatti between 1930 and 1940.

Parish priest Fr Mathew observed that the Catholic population increased in Sundampatti, so he purchased 0.45 acres on the village's north side. Villagers noted that open-air mass was conducted there by Salem bishop Rev. Venmani Selvanathan in 1963. The area became a graveyard, with a small chapel in the middle.

In 1969, Elathagiri parish priest Fr. Ignatius Kalathil purchased 0.92 cents of land in this village, where he built a chapel and conducted Sunday services. Fr. Joachim, Elathagiri's next parish priest, began construction of a church in 1978. On 16 January 1979 the church was completed and services began. Masses were conducted Tuesday evening and Sunday morning.

A Vannathu Chinappar church was built by Elathagiri Parish priest Fr. Amalraj in nearby Soorankottai village during 1993 for the Catholics in that area. Fr. Amalraj, who built the St. Antony church tower in 1994, wanted to provide a good view from the road. This tower was demolished in 2004 to make way for a road expansion and was rebuilt in 2005.

On 2 June 1998 Sundampatti became a Parish and this church became the parish church. Meanwhile, Soorankottai became a sub-church for Sundampatti. A house for the priest was built behind this church in 1999. The Capuchin Fathers then began conducting services in this church. In 1999, Franciscan Sisters of St. Thomas (FST Sisters) began services in this church.

In 2013, the Jesuit congregation of Dharmapuri diocese took over the parish from the Capuchin's, and Rev. Fr. Xavier became the parish priest. During his tenure this church was expanded with the help of donations. The renovated church opened for services on 24 May 2015 with the blessing of Bishop Lawrence Pius of Dharmapuri diocese.

The Capuchin congregation operates in Sundampatti for The Fountain Capuchin Institute of Counseling, Psychotherapy and Research, located on the back side of the church. Capuchin priests support additional holy service by conducting masses in this church.

== List of Parish Priest ==
| Served Year | Priest names |
|---|---|
| 1978-1979 | Rev. Fr. Ignatius Kalathil |
| 1983-1988 | Rev. Fr. Jegaraj |
| 1988-1992 | Rev. Fr. Savari Muthu |
| 1992-1995 | Rev. Fr. Amalraj |
| 1995-1998 | Rev. Fr. Arulsamy |
| 1998-1999 | Rev. Fr. M. Joseph OFM Cap |
| 1999-2003 | Rev. Fr. Augustin OFM Cap |
| 2003-2005 | Rev. Fr. Arulanantham OFM Cap |
| 2006-2008 | Rev. Fr. Arockiaraj OFM Cap |
| 2008-2009 | Rev. Fr. Arul Jaiker OFM Cap |
| 2009-2011 | Rev. Fr. Iruthaya Samy OFM Cap |
| 2011-2012 | Rev. Fr. Thresnathan OFM Cap |
| 2012-2013 | Rev. Fr. Divakar OFM Cap |
| 2013-2016 | Rev. Fr. P. Xavier |
| 2016-2021 | Rev. Fr. Lourdusamy |
| 2021-2023 | Rev. Fr. George |
| 2023 -2025 | Rev. Fr. Susai |
| 2025–present | Rev. Fr. R. Arockia Samy |

== See also ==
- Roman Catholic Diocese of Dharmapuri
- Vinnarasi Madha Church, Kandikuppam
- Our Lady Of Refuge Church, Elathagiri
- Sundampatti, Krishnagiri district
- Our Lady of Fatima Church, Krishnagiri
