= Kurumber Theru =

Kurumber Street Kurumber Theru Mango Village, Food Cook Masters, Sweet Masters, Daily coolie`s
- Village
- Location in Tamil Nadu, India
- Coordinates: 12.5363°N 78.3166°E
- Country: India
- State: Tamil Nadu
- District: Krishnagiri
- Founder: S Thirupathi

Government
  - Type: Kandikuppam Panchayat
  - Body: Bargur BDO
  - Member of Legislative Assembly: V.RAJENDRAN(AIADMK)
- Elevation: 533 m (1,749 ft)

Population (2011)
  - Total: 650

Languages
  - Official: Tamil
- Time zone: UTC+5:30 (IST)
- PIN: 635 108
- Telephone code: (91) 4343
- Vehicle registration: TN-24
- Website: http://www.krishnagiri.tn.nic.in/links.htm

Kurumber Theru (Kurumber street) is a village in Kandikuppam Panchayat, Bargur Block in Krishnagiri district in the state of Tamil Nadu, India. The village is surrounded in all directions by small numerous hillocks, greenery trees and plantations. The village has gained its importance because of mango, coconut and seasonal cultivation like groundnut, cereals, grains.

== Transport ==
Kurumber Theru to Kandikuppam road distance is 1.8 km. Here peoples are facilitating transport their own vehicles or else they should walk. Nearest town Bargur. Kurumber Theru connected NH 48 and State highway access to District Headquarters Krishnagiri & nearest Town Bargur. Neighbor state location Kuppam, A.P 29.0 km (40min travel) from kandikuppam.

== Education ==
There is Government Primary School in Kurumber Theru. Here the surrounding rural area students doing their studies then for higher education they should go out of this villages to Orrapam, Kandikuppam, Elathagiri, Bargur, Etc., This school earlier run with limited students in Palaru Gounder (Ex-Vice President Kandikuppam) private building, Permanent building constructed in the government fund then it was shifted to government building (Currently running location).
