= Plastic road =

Vehicular road made from plastic

Plastic roads are paved roadways that are made partially or entirely from plastic or plastic composites, which is used to replace standard asphalt materials. Most plastic roads make use of plastic waste to replace a portion the asphalt. It is currently unknown how these aggregates will perform in the mid- to long-term, or what effect their degradation might have on surrounding ecosystems.

== Classification ==
"Plastic Roads" can be roads which entirely consist of modular, hollow, and prefabricated road elements made from consumer waste plastics, however, most plastic roads consist of waste plastic used to replace bitumen mixed with recycled asphalt. This type of material is sometimes referred to as Plastic Asphalt.

=== Plastic roads ===
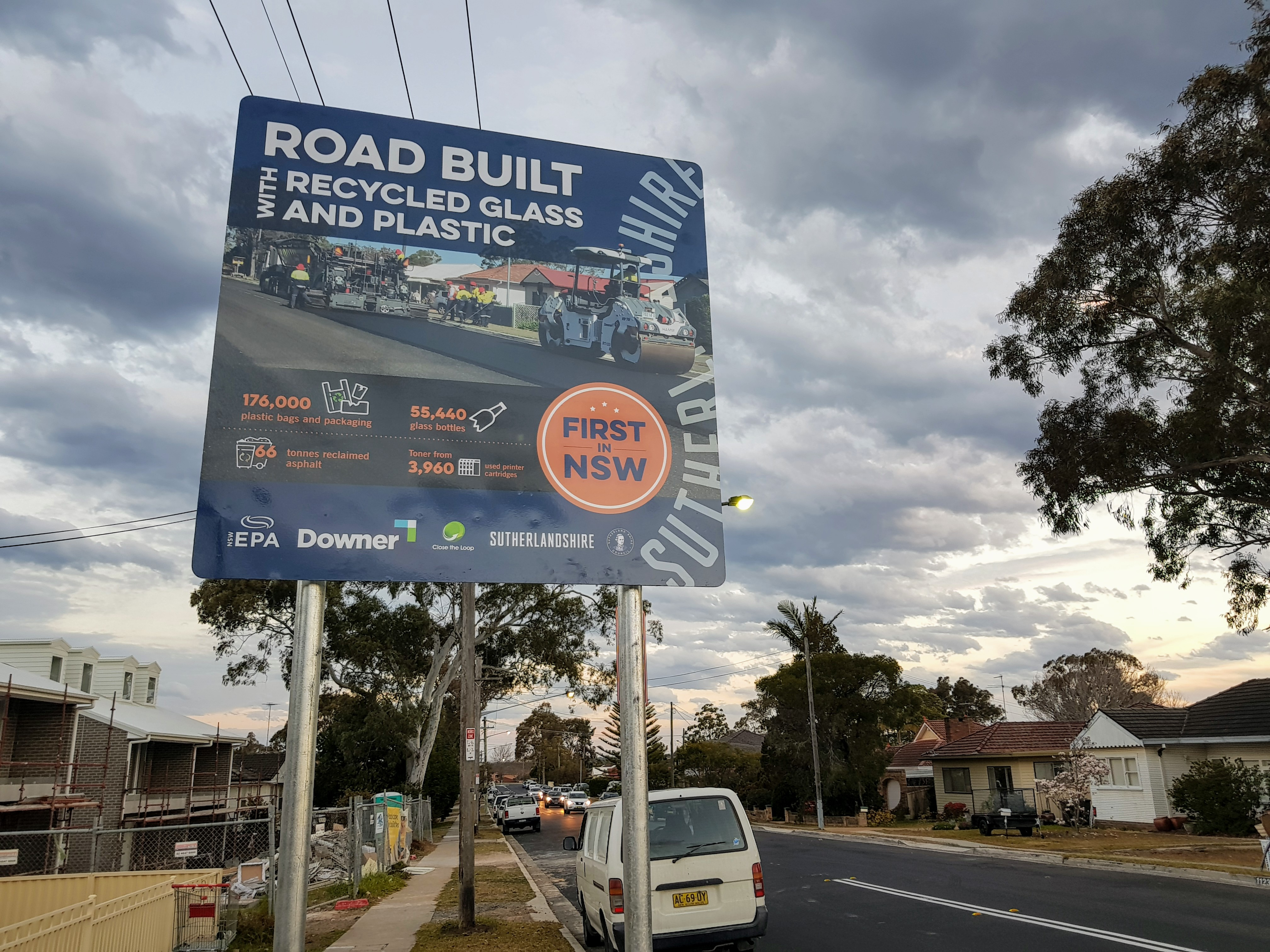
First recycled glass and plastic road in New South Wales, Australia at suburb Engadine

Plastic roads were first developed by Rajagopalan Vasudevan in 2001, consisting of an asphalt mix incorporating plastic waste. The incorporation of plastics in roads could open an additional option for recycling post-consumer plastics. Australia, Indonesia, India, the United Kingdom, the United States, and many other countries have trialed technologies that can incorporate plastic waste into an asphalt mix.

=== PlasticRoad ===
In the Netherlands, in the cities of Zwolle and Giethoorn, there are two bicycle paths made purely from waste plastics. This is the result of an invention by Simon Jorritsma and Anne Koudstaal. collaboration between three companies: VolkerWessels, Wavin, and Total. The "Plastic Road" built by the three companies consists of prefabricated, hollow, modular elements made from consumer waste plastics. Advocates suggest advantages compared to normal roads, including hollow space for the storage of excessive rainwater and benefits from the lightweight and potentially sustainable nature of these roadways.

== Initial development ==
The technology was initially developed and patented by Rajagopalan Vasudevan of the Thiagarajar College of Engineering. In January 2018 Vasudevan was bestowed with one of India's most prominent awards, the Padma Shri, for his research on plastic research and reuse. The plastic-bitumen road-laying technique was covered under a patent held by the Thiagarajar College of Engineering in 2006. The installation of plastic roads firstly comprises the collection of waste plastics, including plastic carry bags, cups, soft and hard foams, and laminated plastics. These are then cleaned by washing, shredded to a uniform size, melted at 165°C then blended with hot aggregates and bitumen. This unique mixture is thereafter used, as a main component, in the eventual construction of a plastic road.

== Construction ==
Since plastic roads are a relatively new idea, construction processes vary. In Jamshedpur, India, roads are created from a mix of plastic and bitumen. In Indonesia, roads are also being built using a plastic-asphalt mix in many areas including Bali, Surabaya, Bekasi, Makassar, Solo, and Tangerang.

These roads are made from recycled plastics, and the first step in constructing them is to collect and manage the plastic material. The plastics involved in building these roads consist mainly of common post-consumer products such as product packaging. Some of the most common plastics used in packaging are polyethylene terephthalate (PET or PETE), polypropylene (PP), and high- and low-density polyethylene (HDPE and LDPE). These materials are first sorted from plastic waste. After sorting, the material is cleaned, dried, and shredded. The shredded plastic is mixed and melted at around 165 °C. Hot bitumen is then added and mixed with the melted plastic. After mixing the mixture is laid as one would with regular asphalt concrete.

So far, no large-scale, systematic approach has been employed to build roads entirely of plastics in any country. On 13 September 2018, the Dutch company Volkerwessels built a bicycle path made of recycled plastic in Zwolle, in the northeast part of the Netherlands. According to the Guardian, "A second path is to be installed in Giethoorn in Overijssel, and Rotterdam is the city most likely to take up the technology."

== Usage by country ==
=== India ===
Chennai was among the first cities globally to adopt the technology in a big way when the municipality commissioned 1000 km of plastic roads in 2004. The first plastic road in Tamil Nadu was laid down in Kambainallur, a Panchayat Town of the Dharmapuri district as per the guidelines of then Chief Minister. Since then all major municipalities in India have experimented with the technology including Pune, Mumbai, Surat, Indore, Delhi, Lucknow, etc.

Chennai: While plastic roads may be a new concept in many parts of India, Chennai has been experimenting with them since 2011. Chennai has used nearly 1,600 tonnes of plastic waste to construct 1,035.23 kilometres length of roads in recent years, which include N.S.C Bose road, Halls road, Ethiraj Silai Street and Sardar Patel Street.

Pune: Using bitumen technology on waste plastic, the Pune Municipal Corporation constructed a 150-metre stretch of Bhagwat lane at Navi Peth near Vaikunth Crematorium in 2016. The other trial patches in Pune include Dattawadi Kaka Halwai Lane, Katraj Dairy, Magarpatta City HCMTR Road, Kavade Mala Road, Koregaon Park Lane No 3 and Yerawada Shadal Baba Darga Road from Chandrama Chowk.

Jamshedpur: Jamshedpur Utility and Services Company (JUSCO), which is a subsidiary company of Tata Steel, constructed a 12–15 km road in the steel city, as well as Tata Steel Works using plastic road, including a nearly 1 km stretch in Ranchi, 500m stretch each in Dhurwa and Morabadi, 3 km of roads in Chas and Jamtara each and 500m stretch in Giridih.

Indore: Dating 2014, the Madhya Pradesh Rural Road Development Authority (MPRRDA) has constructed around 35 km of roads in 17 districts with plastic waste.

Surat: The idea of using plastic-bitumen mix was executed in January 2017. The problem of potholes significantly reduced as no cracks developed in areas where roads were layered with waste plastic.

The technology has penetrated deeply and has found application even in far flung areas such as Meghalaya, where a village converted 430 kg of plastic waste into a kilometer long road in 2018.

In December 2019, India built 21,000 miles of roads using plastic waste. Until now, the country has almost 33,700 km of plastic roadways that means every 1 km road uses one million plastic bags. As of 2021, only 703 kilometers of National Highways were constructed using plastic roads.

=== United Kingdom ===
In January 2019, the Department for Transport announced a £1.6 million UK trial of a plastic road technology developed by MacRebur, an asphalt enhancement company based in Scotland.

Cumbria was the first council in the UK to use the patented asphalt enhancement. Since then, the polymers have also been laid in Dumfries and Galloway, Gloucester, London, Newcastle upon Tyne, Durham and in the Central Belt. As part of the project, research into the technology will be carried out by Gaist, as well as The University of Nottingham, University of Central Lancashire, University of the Sunshine Coast, in Australia and the University of California.

=== Pakistan ===
In December 2021, a 1-km stretch of Islamabad's Ataturk Avenue was entirely relaid with plastic. The project was a collaboration between Capital Development Authority and Coca Cola Company Pakistan. It used 10 tonnes of plastic bottle waste mixed with asphalt.

== Properties ==
Below are some of the advantages and disadvantages of plastic roads.

=== Advantages ===
- In the proposed model by Volkerwessels, plastic roads can have hollow space built in to allow ease of wiring, connecting pipes, etc.
- Since plastics come with various chemical and physical properties, roads can be engineered to meet specific requirements (e.g. weather and wear resistance)
- Plastic roads can be built from waste plastic --- the majority of which is usually put into landfill, incinerated, or polluted into the environment. Land-filling and incinerating plastic are both problematic methods of managing plastic waste. Plastics in landfills can leak pollutants into the surrounding soil; incinerating creates gaseous pollutants, such as carbon dioxide.
- Plastic-bitumen composite roads need not be especially discriminating with the plastics used, thus increasing the reuse of plastic. Most plastic waste is not recycled because it is usually mixed with different types of plastic and non-plastic (e.g. paper labels) and, so far, the segregation process is labor-intensive with no easy solution.
- Using less asphalt saves on cost and resources. Asphalt concrete requires petroleum which is becoming more scarce.
- The addition of plastic in asphalt can reduce the viscosity of the mix. This allows a lower working temperature, which lowers VOC and CO emissions.
- Plastic-bitumen composite roads have better wear resistance than standard asphalt concrete roads. They do not absorb water, have better flexibility which results in less rutting and less need for repair. Road surfaces remain smooth, are lower maintenance, and absorb sound better.

=== Disadvantages ===
- Pure plastic roads require use of compatible plastics because, when melted, plastics of different types may phase-separate and cause structural weaknesses, which can lead to premature failure.
- Plastics in the road can break down into microplastics and can find their way into the soil and bodies of water. These microplastics can also absorb other pollutants.
- Every time maintenance is performed on these modular roads the flow of power, water, and internet that has been installed within will be interrupted.
