= Sundampatti, Krishnagiri =

Village in Tamil Nadu, India

Sundampatti சுண்டம்பட்டி Sundanapalli
- Village
- சுண்டனப்பள்ளி
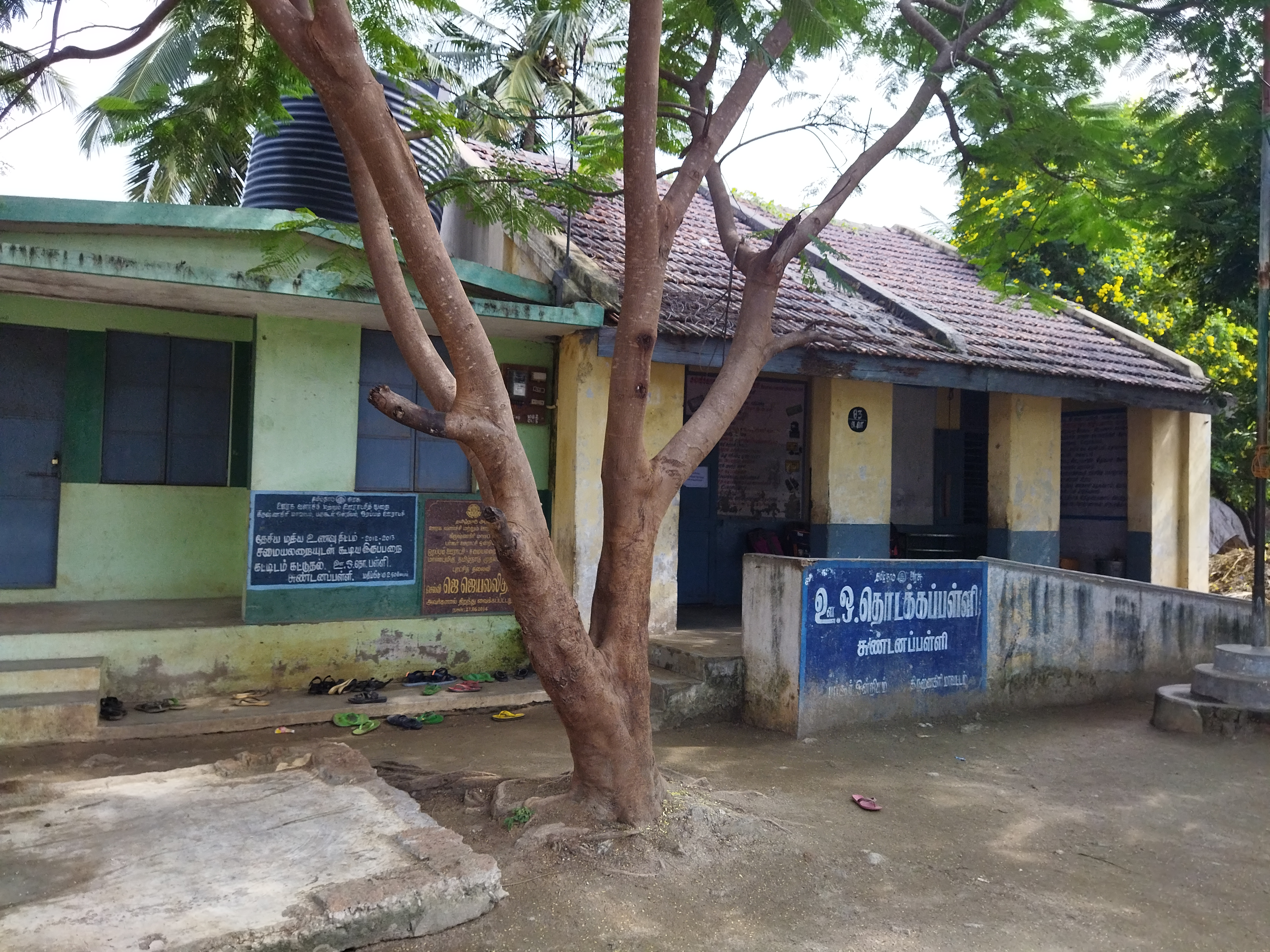
- Government Primary School in this village
- Nickname: Sundenpatti
- Location of Sundampatti in Tamilnadu
- Coordinates: 12.538245°N 78.268083°E
- Country: India
- State: Tamil Nadu
- District: Krishnagiri
- Block: Bargur
- Panchayat: Orappam
- PIN: 635108

Sundampatti or officially called as Sundanapalli is a village lies on National Highway 48, which is located 6.8 km away from District capital Krishnagiri and it is part of the Orappam Grama Panchayat under Bargur Block of Krishnagiri district in Tamil Nadu. The village is known for its religious spots like Mariamman temple, St. Antony's Church, and Parshwa Padmavathi Jain Temple.

== See also ==
- Elathagiri
- Krishnagiri district
