= Kottur, Bargur =

Village in Tamil Nadu, India

Kottur கோட்டூர்
- Village
- Kottor
- Location within Tamil Nadu
- Coordinates: 12.5293°N 78.4020°E
- Country: India
- State: Tamil Nadu
- Region: Kongu Nadu
- District: Krishnagiri
- Thaluk: Krishnagiri
- Block: Bargur
- Panchayat: Oppathavadi

Population (2011)
  - Total: 6,656

Languages
  - Official: Tamil
  - Secondary: Telugu
- Time zone: UTC+5:30 (IST)
- PIN: 635104
- Post Office: Sigaralapalli
- Telephone code: 91-4343
- Vehicle registration: TN 24
- Lok Sabha Constituency: Krishnagiri
- Lok Sabha Member: A. Chellakumar
- Assembly Constituency: Bargur
- Assembly Member: E. C. Govindarasan

Kottur is a small village in Oppathavadi Grama panchayat, Bargur block, Krishnagiri district in the state of Tamil Nadu, India. It is located 6 km (3.7 mi) away from Bargur and 23 km (14 mi) away from the district capital Krishnagiri.
