= Rajagopalan Vasudevan =

Indian scientist

- Born: Tamil Nadu
- Education: Madras University
- Known for: Waste Management; Plastic roads
- Awards: Padma Shri
- Scientific career
- Fields: Chemistry
- Workplaces: Thiagarajar College of Engineering

Rajagopalan Vasudevan, is an Indian scientist who has worked mainly in waste management. He is currently a professor in Thiagarajar College of Engineering. He developed an innovative method to reuse plastic waste to construct better, more durable and very cost-effective roads. He thought up the idea of shredding plastic waste, mixing it with bitumen and using the polymerized mix in road construction. This method will help in making roads much faster and also will save environment from dangerous plastic waste. He also visited Mahatma schools on 15 April 2008. The roads also show greater resistance to damages caused by heavy rains. His road construction method is now widely used to construct roads in rural India.

== Career ==
He obtained his Bachelor of Science degree and M.Sc. degree from the Madras University in 1965 and 1967 respectively. He also earned his PhD from the same university in 1974. Later in 1975, he joined Thiagarajar College of Engineering as lecturer and became professor in 1998.

== Research ==
His research mainly deals with waste management specifically use of waste plastics for road and building constructions.

== Awards ==
He was awarded India's fourth highest civilian honour Padma Shri in 2018. The following year, he became a laureate of the Asian Scientist 100 by the Asian Scientist.
