= Kathanpallam =

Village in Tamil Nadu, India

Kathanpallam காத்தான்பள்ளம்
- Village
- Location within Tamil Nadu
- Coordinates: 12.5413°N 78.2923°E
- Country: India
- State: Tamil Nadu
- Region: Kongu Nadu
- District: Krishnagiri
- Thaluk: Krishnagiri
- Block: Bargur
- Panchayat: Orappam

Languages
  - Official: Tamil
- Time zone: UTC+5:30 (IST)
- PIN: 635108
- Post Office: Elathagiri
- Telephone code: 91-4343
- Vehicle registration: TN 24
- Lok Sabha Constituency: Krishnagiri
- Lok Sabha Member: A. Chellakumar
- Assembly Constituency: Bargur
- Assembly Member: E. C. Govindarasan

Kathanpallam is a village located under the jurisdiction of Orappam Grama panchayat, Bargur block, Krishnagiri district in the state of Tamil Nadu, India. This village is 10 km (6.2 mi) away from the capital Krishnagiri.

== Culture ==
Kathanpallam holds a unique cultural identity, heavily influenced by the presence of Catholic missionaries who settled in nearest village Elathagiri over a century ago. As a result, the village has a notable population of Catholics who actively participate in religious rituals and festivities. The missionaries not only brought the Catholic faith but also played an integral role in establishing educational in the village.

== Education institutes ==
- Gonzaga Metric Higher Secondary School
- Gonzaga Arts & Science College for Women's
