= Vinnarasi Madha Church, Kandikuppam =

Roman Catholic Church in Tamil Nadu, India

Vinnarasi Madha Church
- Our Lady Of Queen Of Heaven Church
- Queen of Heaven Church
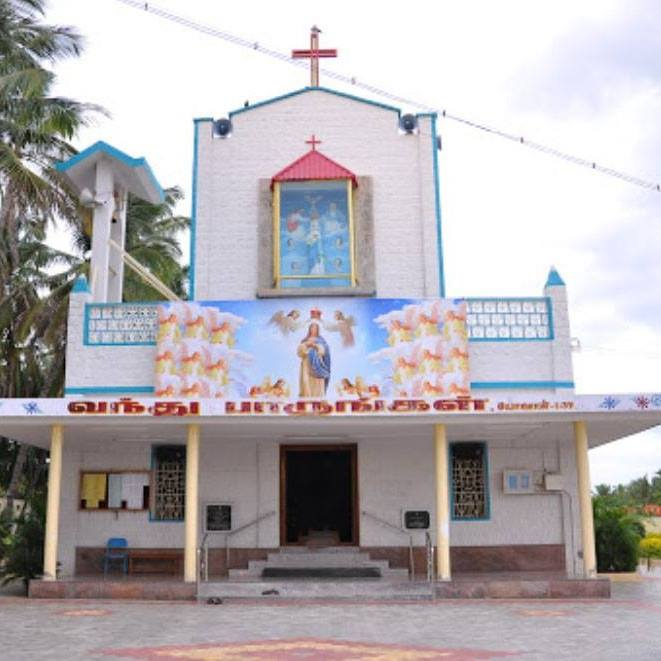
- Front View of the church
- Vinnarasi Madha Church
- 12.54390°N 78.31107°E
- Location: Kandikuppam, Bargur, Krishnagiri, Tamil Nadu
- Country: India
- Denomination: Catholic
- Religious institute: Jesuit

History
- Status: Parish church
- Founded: 1929
- Founder(s): Fr. Ignatius & Fr. Dominic

Architecture
- Functional status: Active
- Architectural type: Church
- Style: Medieval
- Years built: 1977

Administration
- District: Krishnagiri
- Archdiocese: Pondicherry and Cuddalore
- Diocese: Dharmapuri
- Deanery: Krishnagiri
- Parish: Kandikuppam

Clergy
- Archbishop: Francis Kalist
- Bishop: Lawrence Pius Dorairaj
- Priest: Fr. I Robert

The Vinnarasi Madha Church, also called Our Lady of Queen of Heaven Church, is a Roman Catholic Parish Church in Kandikuppam village, Krishnagiri district, in the Indian state of Tamil Nadu. It is situated on the Krishnagiri - Bargur National Highway NH48. It is the place of worship for about 3000 Catholics living in that village. Under this parish administration there are 4 Churches (Chapels), a Divine center and Middle School. This church is servers under the administration of Dharmapuri Diosceses.

== History ==
Since 1792, there have been Catholics around Kandikuppam village.

According to Rev Fr. Leo Debian's record at first settlement of Catholics happened in Kockanoor village near Kandikuppam. This record states were two families (Jaadi Manim and Kollapatti families) lived in Maruderi Village in the banks of South Pennar River near Kaveripatinam. After the invasion of Tipu Sultan, they moved to present-day Punganur in Andhra Pradesh then returned to South and settled in Kockanoor, while their branch families settled in Elathagiri. Kandikuppam became a sub-station of Elathagiri in 1929. A primary school was built during this time, then in 1973 the school became St. Xavier Middle School. Elathagiri Parish Priest Rev. Fr. Joshua MEP bought a plot of land in 1954 in Kandikuppam near the Madras Highways (where the present Church is located). Later, additional lands were acquired in 1965, 1972, 1973, and 1985 to surround this Church land.

Fr. Jean Pierre Martin MEP was born in France on 29-12-1881, became a priest on 29-6-1905, and came to India on 16-8-1905 to serve in the Kumbakonam Diocese. After that he served in various parishes including Michaelpatti, Thooluurpatti, and Kottapalayam. He served as a lecturer at St. Peter's Seminary, Uzhavarkarai, Pondicherry, from 1919 to 1930. In 1930, Salem became a new diocese, and from 1930 to 1932, he served as parish priest at Elathagiri Church. From 1933 to 1960, he was a professor at Salem Suramangalam Seminary. After 1960, he moved back to Kandikuppam and worked with local people, helping them with their education and missionary service. He spent the rest of his days in Ooty-Wellington Missionary homage due to his age, he died on 10-2-1969, and his graveyard is still present in Salem Bishop House.

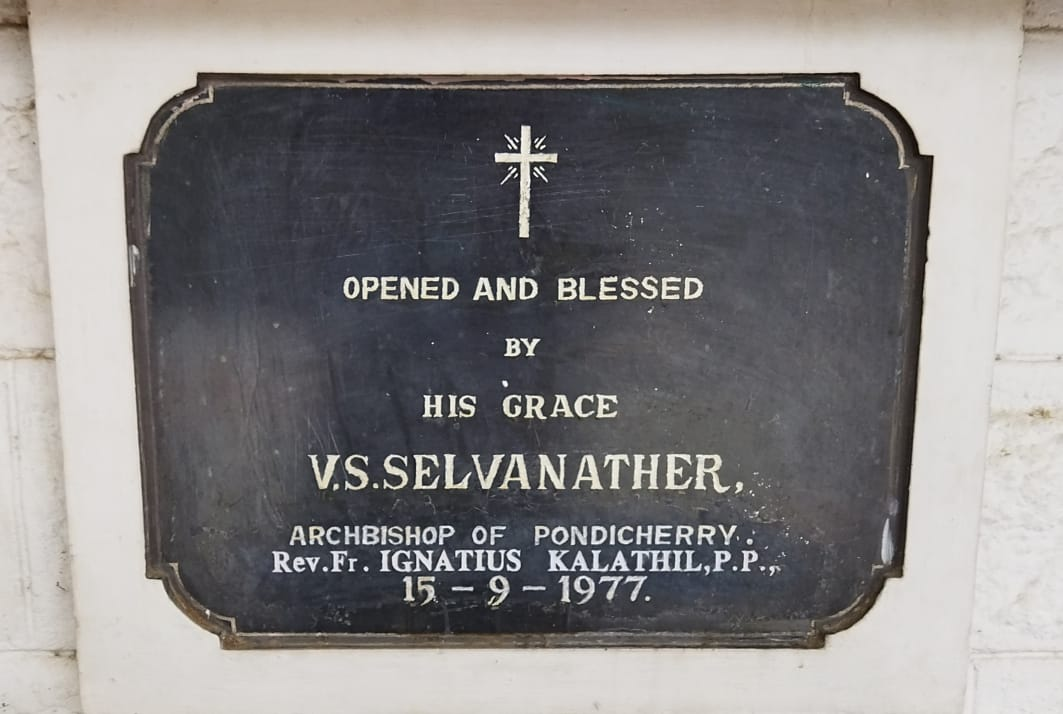
Foundation Stone

Elathagiri men's hostel Warden Rev. Fr. Ignatius Kalathil and Elathagiri St. Anthony's School headmaster Rev Fr. Dominic showed interest in building a church in Kandikuppam with the help and support of local people and Salem diocese charity Vinnarasi Madha Church was built. On 15-9-1977, this church started its service to Kandikuppam villagers with the blessing of Pondicherry Archbishop V. S. Selvanathan

Kandikuppam became a parish on 1-6-1979 with Rev. Fr. Felix Rafel MEP as its first parish priest. Fr. Felix was born in France on 7-2-1915 and became a priest in 7-10-1945. in 7-10-1945 and came to India to serve under Salem Diocese. He served in various places like Perunkuruchi, Denkanikottai, Kosavampatti, and Vellalapalayam before serving in Kandikuppam as Parish priest from 1979 to 1981. Then till 1992 he Severed in Pudupalayam Parish then he went back to his home land France and he died in 11-4-1997.

In 1981 to 1986 Rev. Fr. Ignatius become a 2nd Parish priest for during his time CIC Madurai Sisters stayed in Kandikuppam and started their service to church and Schools.

Rev Fr. Henry George promoted Kottur St Antony's Church into a Parish Church for Bargur on 23-1-1998. Rev Fr. Maria Joseph built a new priest stay house on 28-4-2003 with in the Church campus. During the period of Rev. Fr. Arulsamy, the Ambiyam project was successfully implemented with in all families with the help of the Dioceses. A shopping complex was also constructed in the east side of the church, which contributes to the revenue of the church.

== Substations ==
There are five substations comes under Kandikuppam Parish.

- In 1990 a land was brought in Achamangalam during the period of Rev. Fr. Henry George. From 20-5-1999 Kulandhai Yesu Church was constructed and started this service for Achamangalam villagers.
- For the Catholics who live near Kamraj Nagar (Adaikalapuram) a Chapel was built in 1996 in the name of Adaikala Annai
- Arokiya Mary Chapel was built for Kockanoor villager and started its service since 8-9-1999.
- In 2005 Vanathu Anthoniyar Chapel was built for the Catholics who live near Thandavanpallam village.
Sub-stations churchs of Kandikuppam Parish
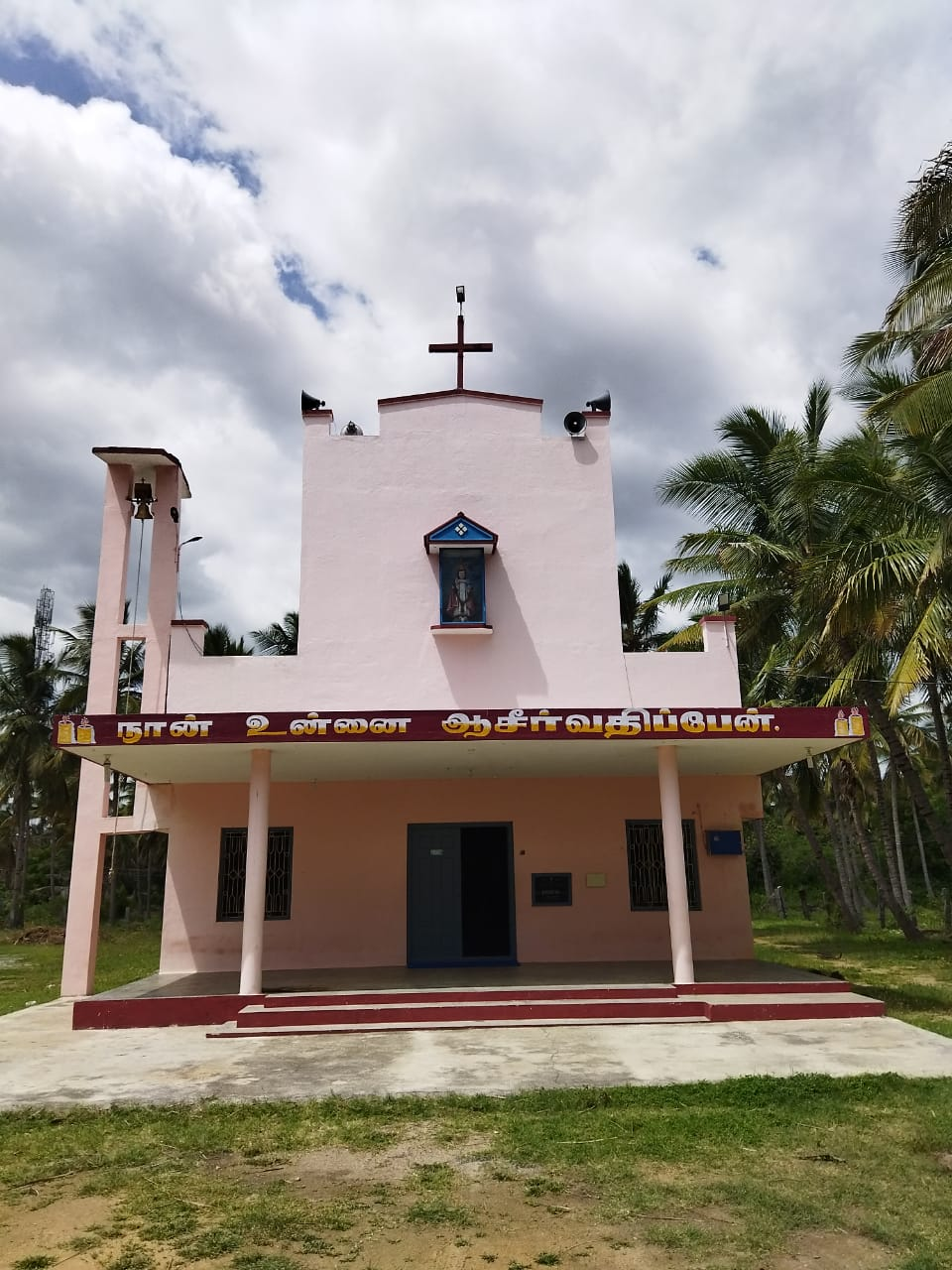
Infant Jesus Church, Achamangalam, Kandikuppam.

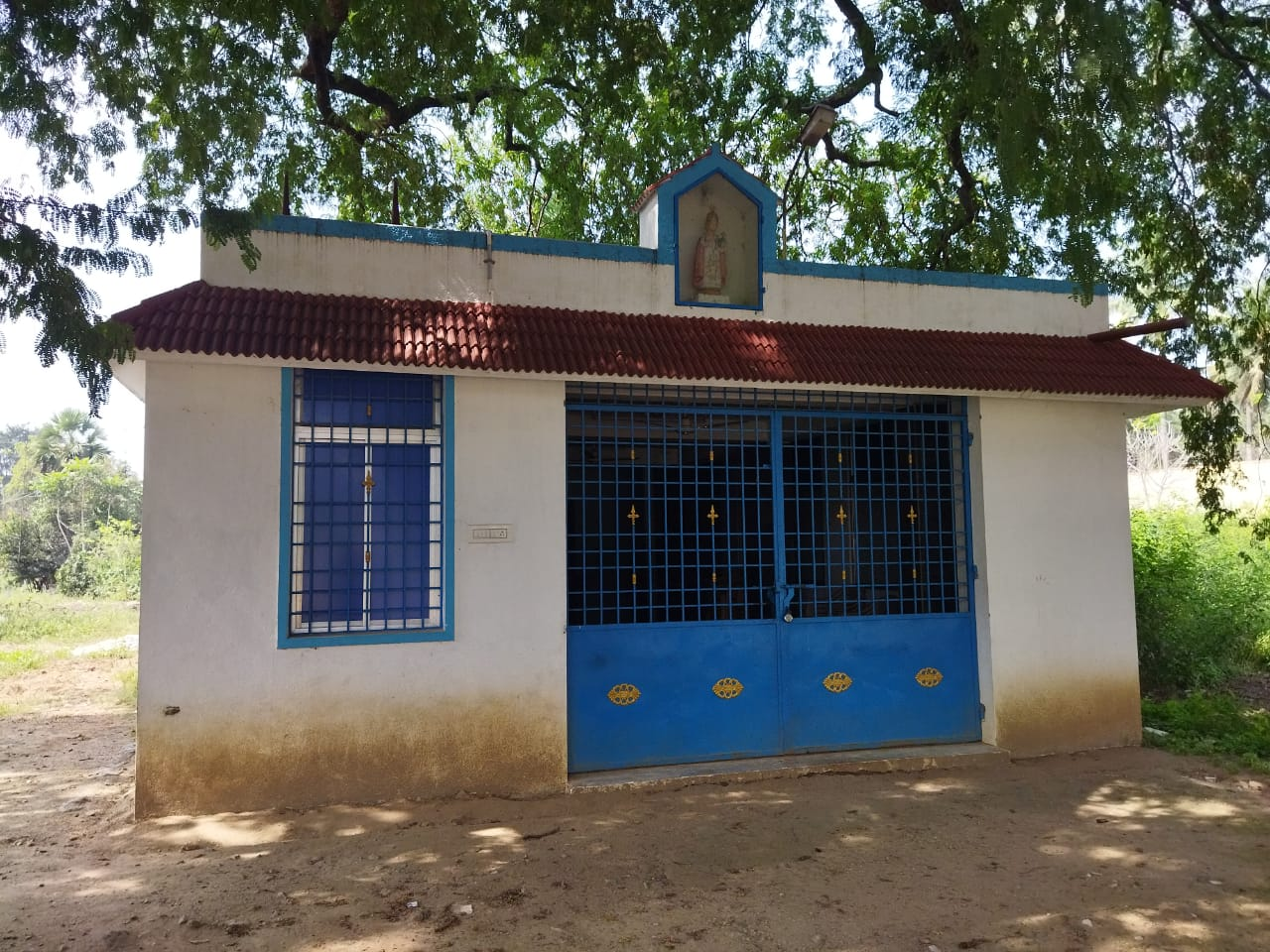
Our Lady of Refugee Chapel, Adaikalapuram, Kamaraj Nagar, Kandikuppam.

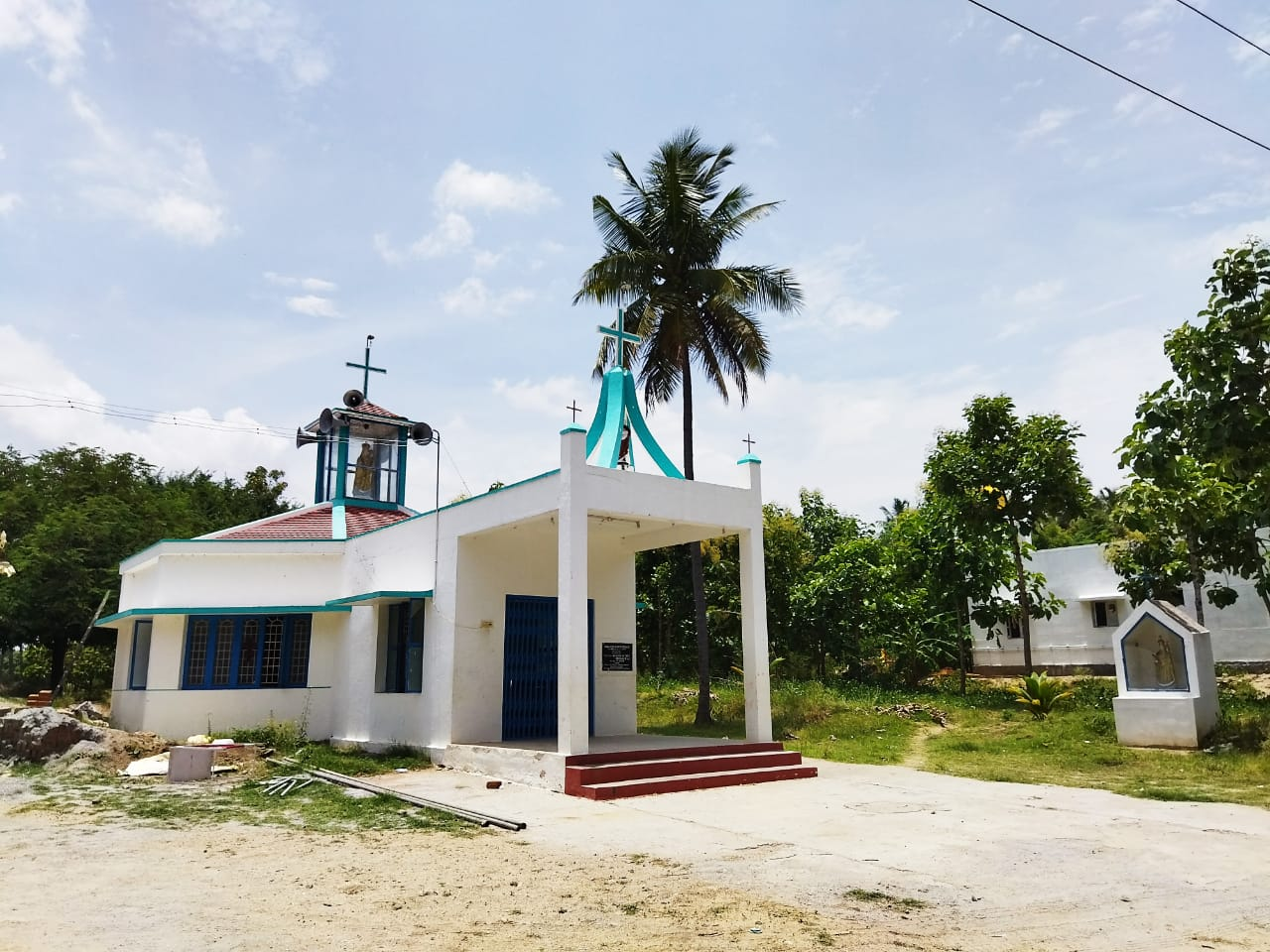
Velankanni Arokiya Madha Chapel, Arokiya Nagar, Kockanoor, Kandikuppam

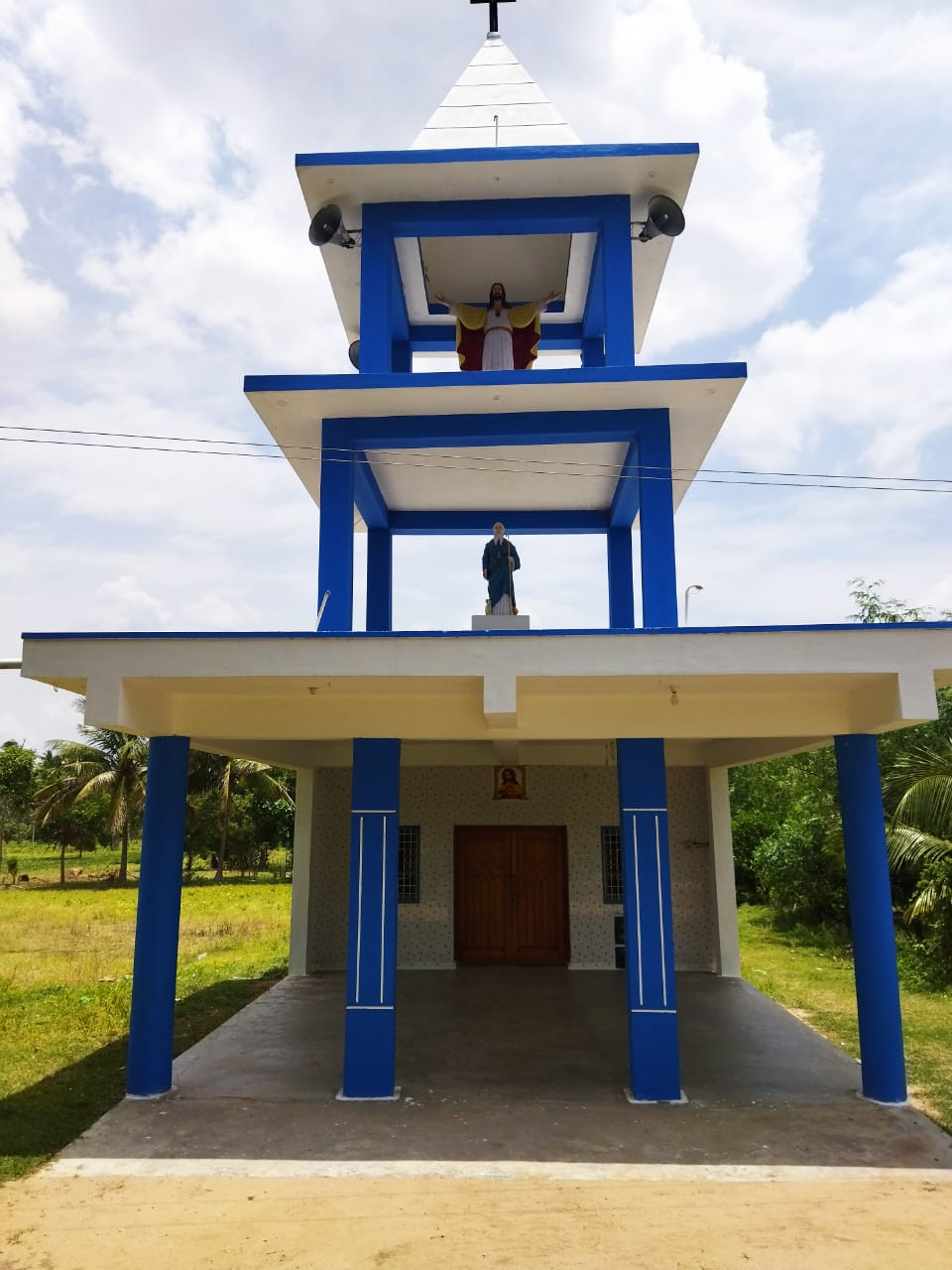
Vannathu Andoniyar Chapel, Andhoniyar Nagar, Thandavanpallam, Kandikuppam
photo:aultabulta

== List of Parish Priests ==
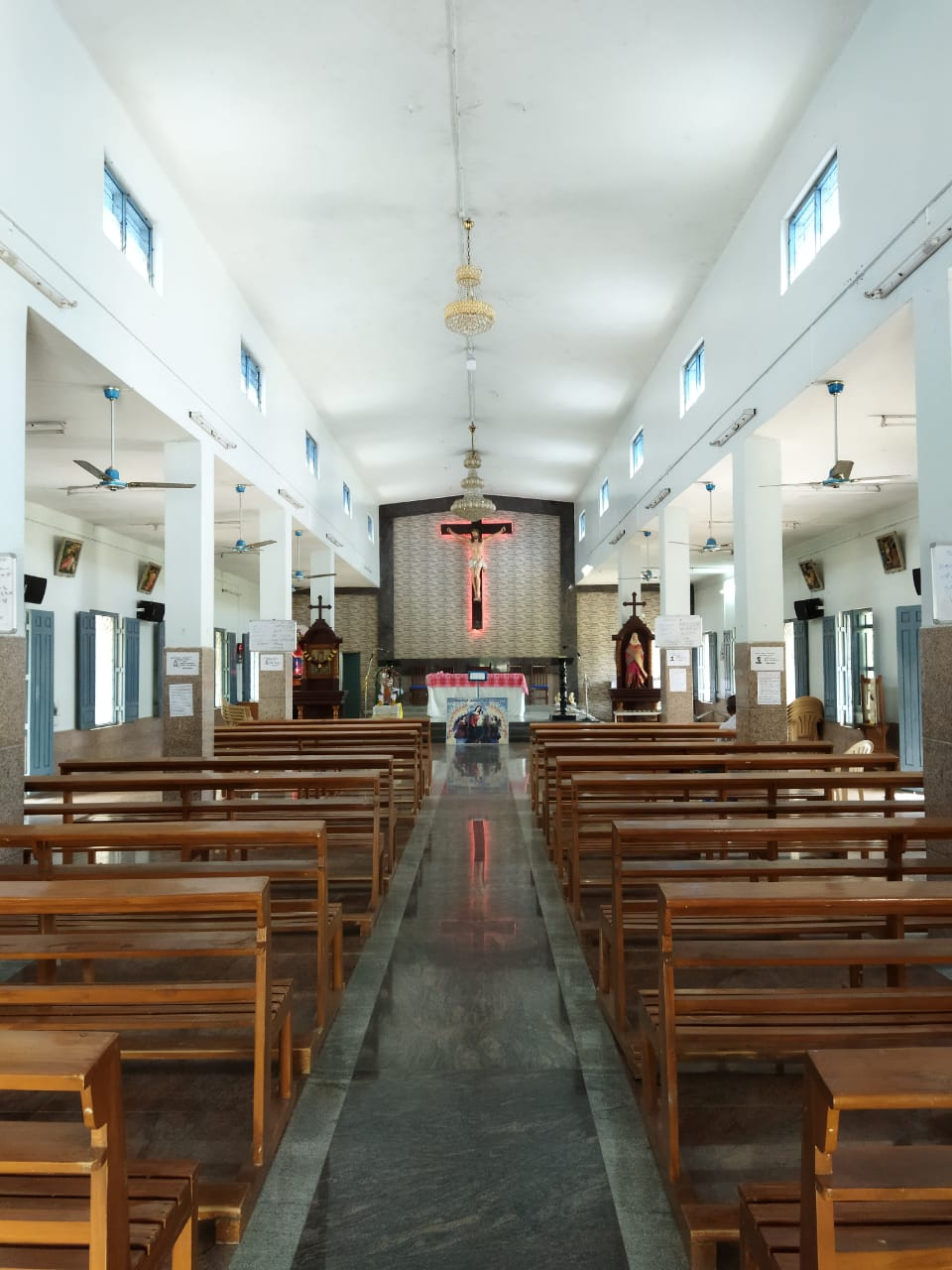
Vinarasi Madha Church Interior

Years served	Name
1979-1981	Rev. Fr. Felix Rafel MEP
1981-1986	Rev. Fr. Ignatius Kalathil
1987-1989	Rev. Fr. Thomas Keeranchira
1989-1991	Rev. Fr. M. Dominic
1991-1992	Rev. Fr. A. Rosario
1992-1994	Rev. Fr. S. Arokiyasamy
1994-1999	Rev Fr. s. Henry George
1999-2004	Rev. Fr. S. Mario Joseph
2004-2008	Rev. Fr. M. Arulsamy
2008-2013	Rev. Fr. S. Sowariyappan
2013-2015	Rev Fr. S. Arokiya James
2015-2018	Rev. Fr. A. Arpudharaj
2018-2021	Rev. Fr. A. Madhalaimuthu
From 2021	Rev. Fr. M. Albert William
