= Nellimarathupatti, Dharmapuri =

Nellimarathupatti நெல்லிமரத்துப்பட்டி
- Village
- Location within Tamil Nadu
- Coordinates: 12.2197°N 78.3302°E
- Country: India
- State: Tamil Nadu
- Region: Kongu Nadu
- District: Dharmapuri
- Thaluk: Denkanikottai
- Block: Morappur
- Panchayat: Kelavalli

Population (2011)
  - Total: 374

Languages
  - Official: Tamil
- Time zone: UTC+5:30 (IST)
- PIN: 635202
- Post Office: Kambainallur
- Telephone code: 91-4346
- Vehicle registration: TN 24
- Lok Sabha Constituency: Dharmapuri
- Assembly Constituency: Harur
- Assembly Member: V. Sampathkumar

Nellimarathupatti is a hamlet located 6 km away from Kambainallur. This hamlet falls under the jurisdiction of Kelavalli Panchayat, which is part of the Morappur block in the Dharamapuri District of Tamil Nadu, India.

== See also ==
- Kambainallur
- Our Lady of Mount Carmel Church, Nellimarathupatti
