= Our Lady of Refuge Church, Elathagiri =

Roman Catholic Church in Tamil Nadu, India

Adaikala Madha Church
- Our Lady Of Refuge Church
- புனித அடைக்கல மாதா ஆலயம்
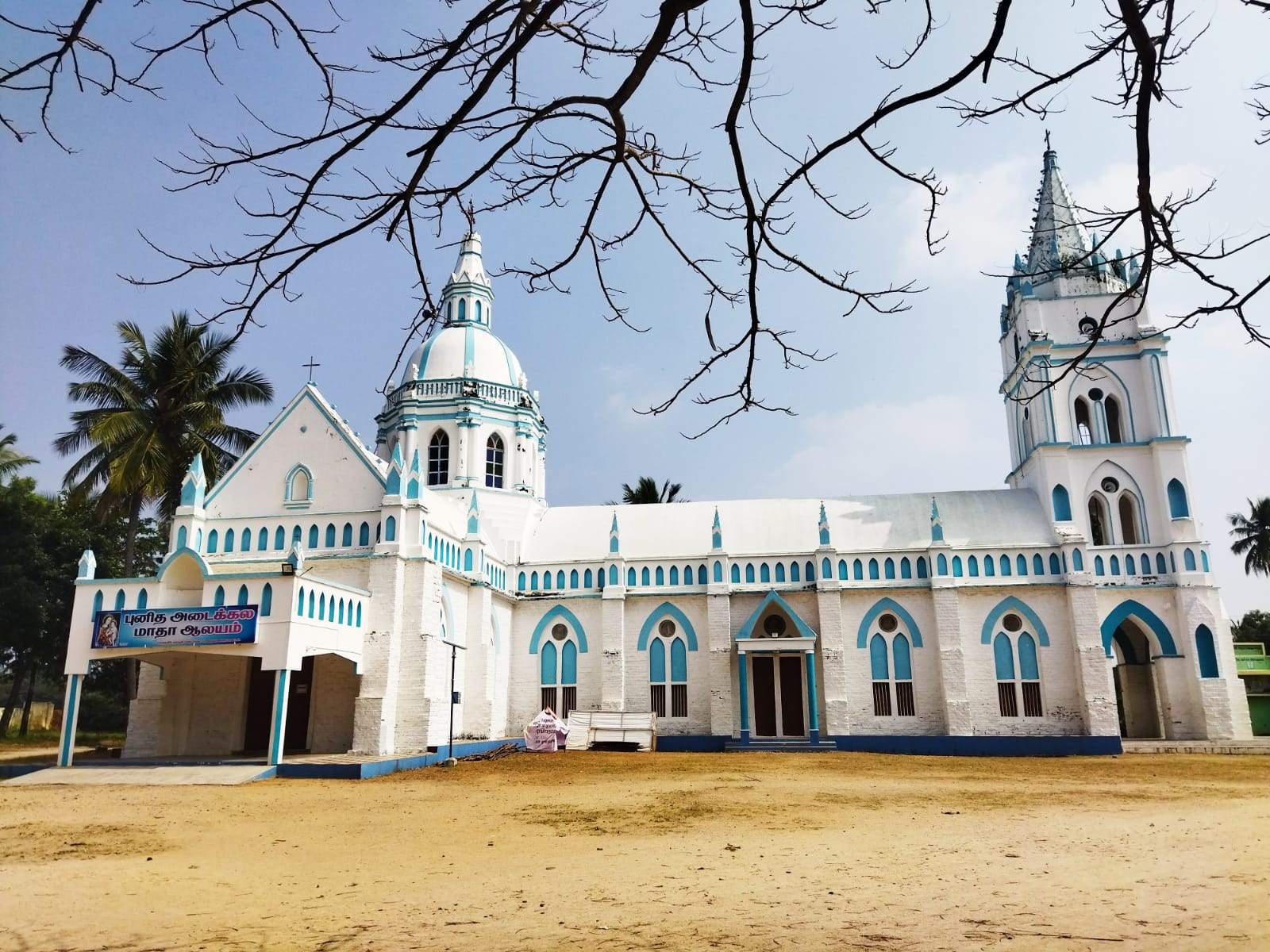
- Side View of the church
- Adaikala Madha Church
- 12.5511°N 78.2947°E
- Location: Elathagiri, Bargur, Krishnagiri, Tamil Nadu
- Country: India
- Denomination: Catholic
- Religious institute: Jesuit

History
- Status: Parish church
- Founded: 1863
- Founder(s): Fr. Welter Dolasbore and Fr. Ormond MEP

Architecture
- Functional status: Active
- Architectural type: Church
- Style: Medieval
- Groundbreaking: 1904
- Completed: 1922

Administration
- District: Krishnagiri
- Archdiocese: Pondicherry and Cuddalore
- Diocese: Dharmapuri
- Deanery: Krishnagiri
- Parish: Elathagiri

Clergy
- Archbishop: Francis Kalist
- Bishop: Lawrence Pius Dorairaj
- Priest: Rev. Fr. D. Devasagayam

Our Lady of Refuge Church, known locally as Adaikala Madha Church, is a 100-year-old church located in Elathagiri village, Tamil Nadu, India. It is the first parish church in Krishnagiri district. Every year Paara Koil celebrations are held which are popular throughout the diocese. This church has contributed a lot to the Catholic society by providing people to holy service. As many as twenty-five priests and more than a hundred sisters have been given by Elathagiri parishes. Furthermore, the Bishop of Salem, Rev. Singaroyan, also belongs to this parish.

== History ==
The Jesuit missionaries preached in Kaveripatinam, Agaram-Barur, Maruderi, Uthankarai-Kanampatti, Maliampatti, Nellimarathupatti, Krishnagiri-Vennampalli, Mottur, and Anganamalai, which led to many people converting to the Catholics. After the decline of Tipu Sultan in this region, Paris missionaries invited Catholics to settle from the above-mentioned village to Elathagiri. In 1782, Micheal Nayagam from Melvidhi-Maliampatti, which is near Uthankarai, was the first family to settle in this village according to Rev. Fr. Debian's record. In 1784, Thottam Chinnappan family from Nellimarathupatti settled in this village, according to the book Saruthira Surukkam, written by Salem diocesan priests. Before 1827, settlements were made from Ennampalli, Mottur, Kollapatti (near Vennampalli), Kaanampatti, and Maliampatti. In the book Saruthira Surukkam, many migrations are mentioned between 1780 and 1830. In 1859, Kovilur, Thirupattur became a parish after separation from Kovilur, Dharmapuri Parish. After that, Chapels in Elathagiri, Krishnagiri, and Krishnakuppam became sub-stations of Kovilur, Thirupattur Parish.

In 1863, a church was built in the name of Our Lady of Refuge. In 1897, Elathagiri-Kadagathur became a deanery. Famous Pondicherry Missionary Architecture Rev Fr. Welter Dholsburg MEP started the foundation process for this church on 14-11-1900. But the church construction completed on 1922. During the time of Rev. Fr. Urmont MEP, the church tower was raised and completed between 1949 and 1951.

=== Disease in Elathagiri ===
In 1904, Cholera started spreading across India during the time Elathagiri was also affected. Infected people went to the rock next to the village and started praying; after the prayers, they were cured. A chapel was built on the rock later, which evolved into a church, known as Paara Kovil by the locals. Every year Paara Koil celebrations are held, which are popular throughout the diocese.

== Education ==
An elementary school was founded in 1923 in the old church building as St. Guardian Angel School. In 1947, it was renamed as St. Antony's Middle School, in 1957 it became a high school, and in 1980 it became a higher secondary school.

Headmaster Rev. Fr. Joseph started a home for boys in the name of Saint Joseph in 1957. Later during the reign of Rev. Fr. Ignatius, a hostel was built in the name of Saint Aloysius.

== Convents ==
On 19 March 1904, Pondicherry FIHM sisters settled in Elathagiri in a house and began their missionary service. Later, in 1906, a convent building was constructed and they moved into the convent.

FSM sisters started their service in Elathagiri in 1953 at the request of Rev. Fr. Joshua, in 1954 they built a hospital and started the service and in 1957 they opened a girl's hostel.

By 1998, the FSAG Sisters (Franciscan Sisters of St. Aloysius Gonzaga) had established a convent in their neighboring village, Kathanpallam. In 2009, they established Gonzaga Arts and Science College for Women.

== List Parish Priest ==
Served Year	Parish Priest
1901-1928	Rev. Fr. S. Dominic
1928-1930	Rev. Fr. M. Dominic
1930-1932	Rev. Fr. Martin MEP
1932-1934	Rev. Fr. Buliyard MEP
1934-1935	Rev. Fr. Haro MEP
1936-1940	Rev. Fr. Leo Debini MEP
1940-1942	Rev. Fr. Mersiyar MEP
1942-1949	Rev. Fr. Zecharias
1949-1951	Rev. Fr. Harment
1951-1958	Rev. Fr. Joshua
1958-1960	Rev. Fr. T.S. Joshua
1960-1961	Rev. Fr. M.S. Joseph
1961-1962	Rev. Fr. D. Arul
1962-1964	Rev. Fr. Mathew Godwill
1964-1972	Rev. Fr. Ignatius Kalathil
1972-1980	Rev. Fr. K.P. Suvukin
1981-1982	Rev. Fr. Arul Sundaram
1982-1986	Rev. Fr. A. Sebastian
1986-1987	Rev. Fr. S. Pushpanathan
1987-1988	Rev. Fr. M. Jegaraj
1988-1992	Rev. Fr. D.M. Savarimuthu
1992-1994	Rev. Fr. S. Amalaraj
1994-1998	Rev. Fr. M. Arulsami
1998-1999	Rev. Fr. M. Jegaraj
1999-2004	Rev. Fr. M. Anthonisamy
2004-2005	Rev. Fr. S. Mariya Joseph
2005-2008	Rev. Fr. S. Hendry George
2008-2013	Rev. Fr. A. Susairaj
2013-2014	Rev. Fr. K. Mariya Joseph
2014-2017	Rev. Fr. J. Arokiyasamy
2017 - Pre	Rev. Fr. C. Micheal Andrews

== Sub Station Church ==
Sub-Station Church
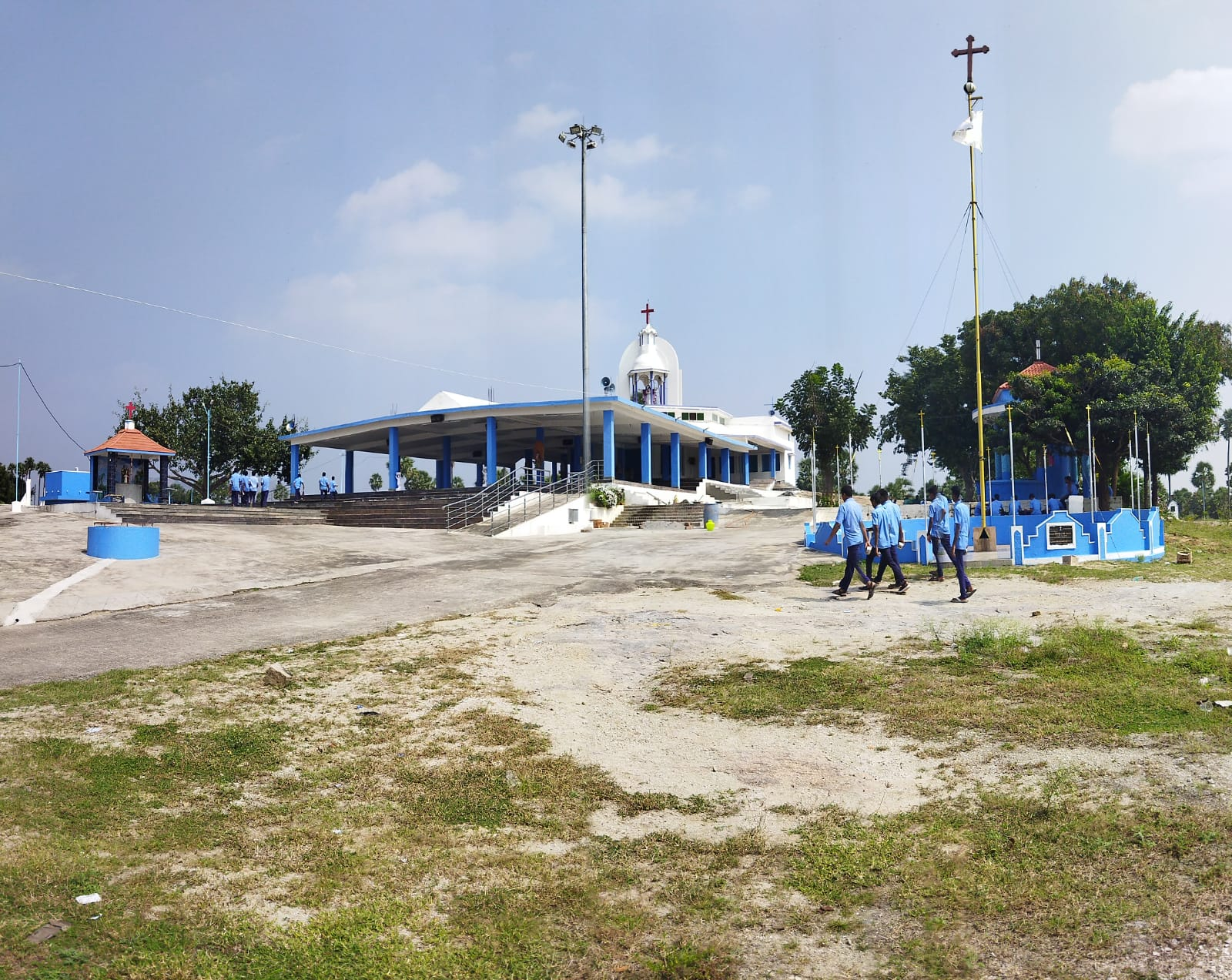
Parai Kovil - Holy Family Church - Elathagiri

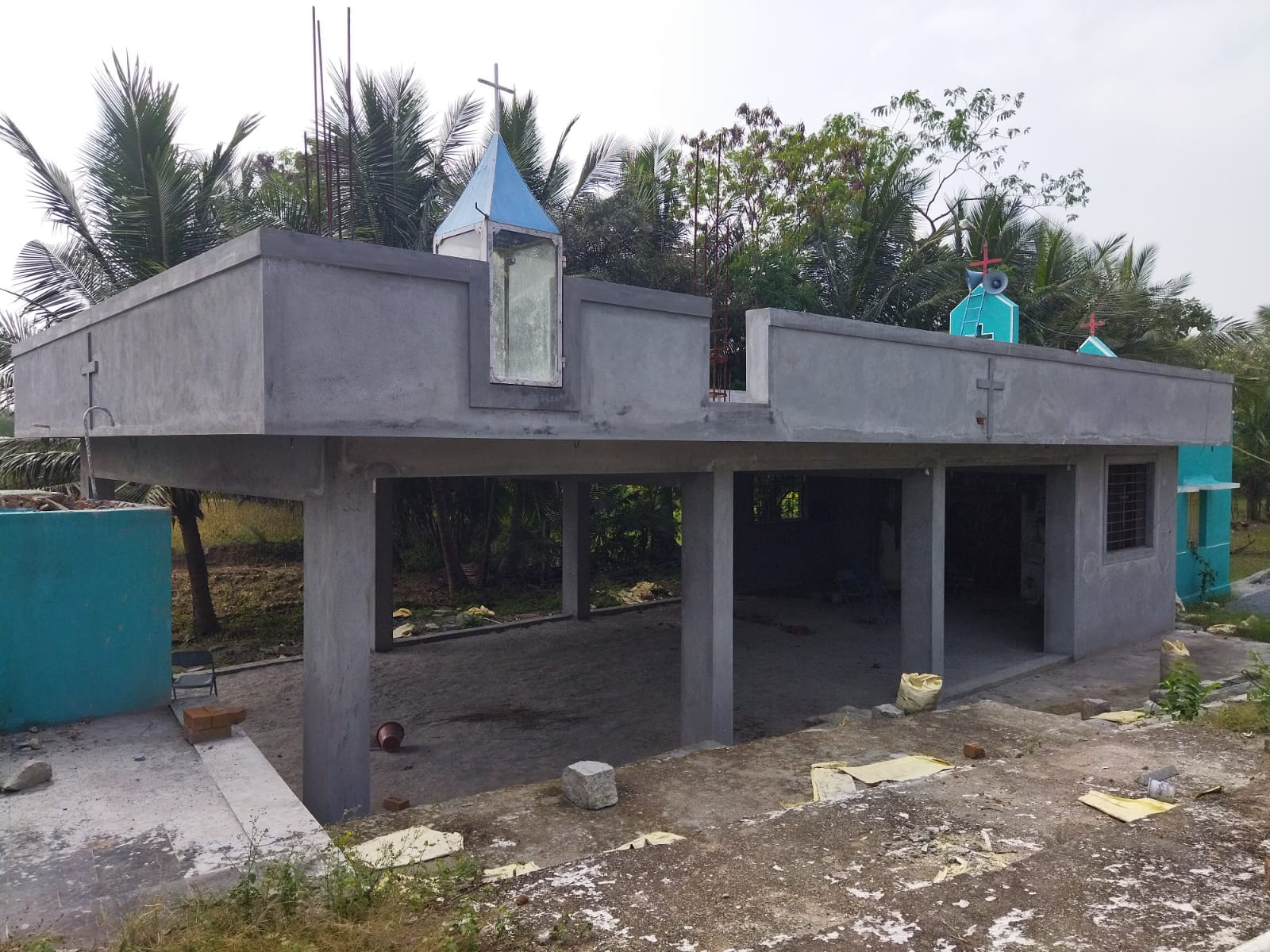
Perianayagi Madha Church, Madha Nagar, JC Pudur, Elathagiri(under Renovation)

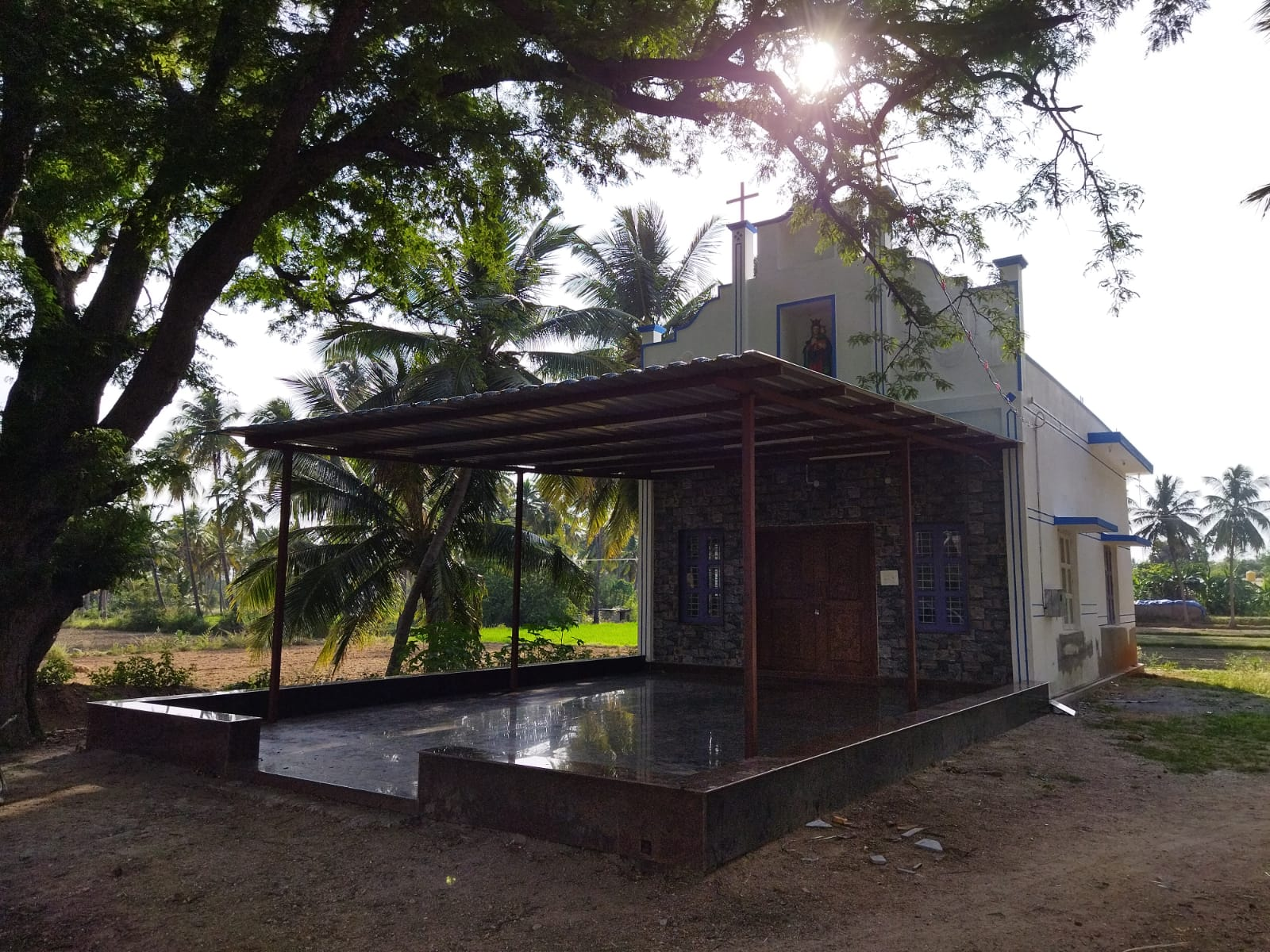
Sagaya Madha Church, Sagayapuram, Elathagiri

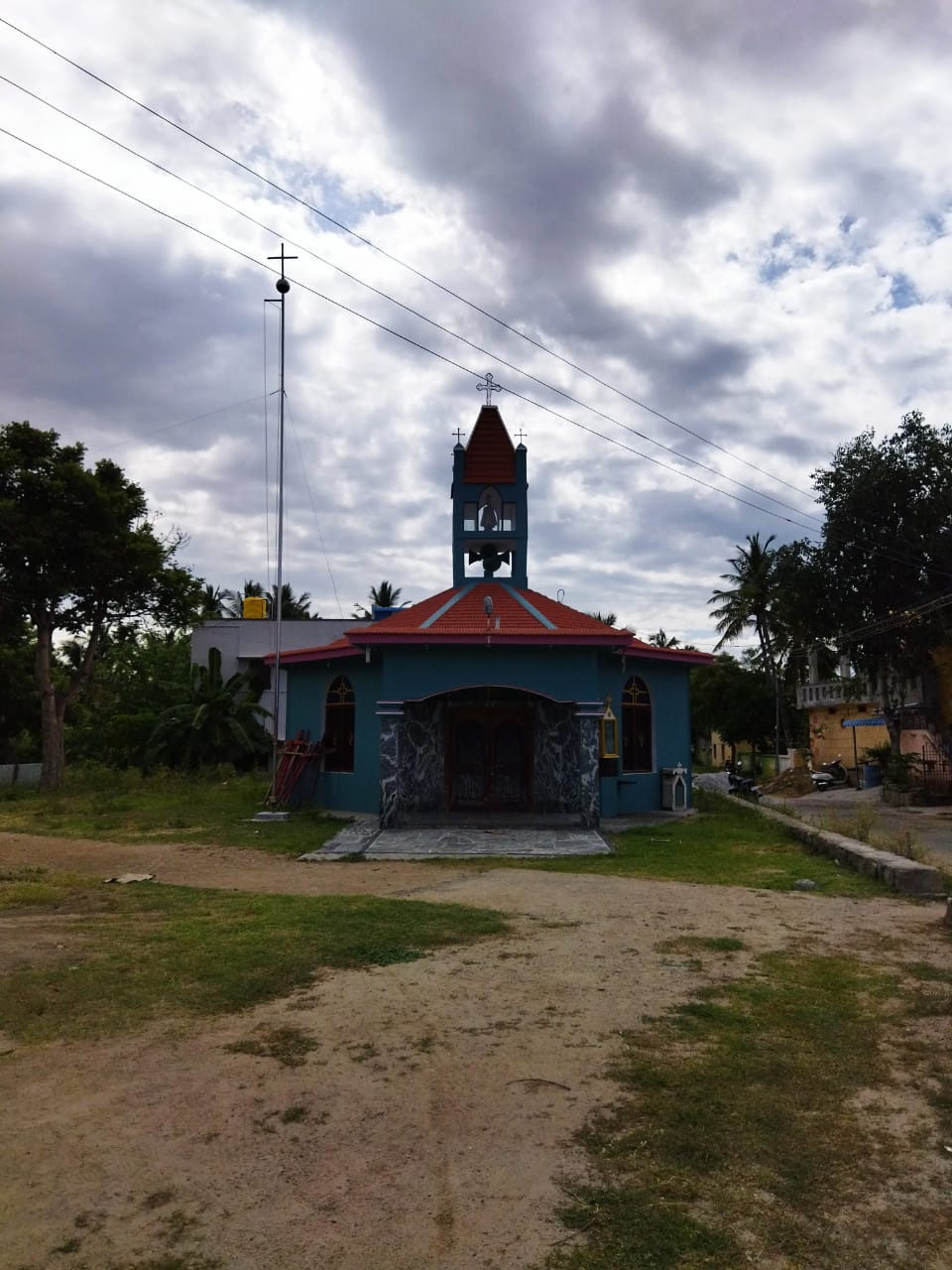
Infant Jesus Chapel, Kuzhandaiyesu nagar, Kandikuppam Rd, Elathagiri

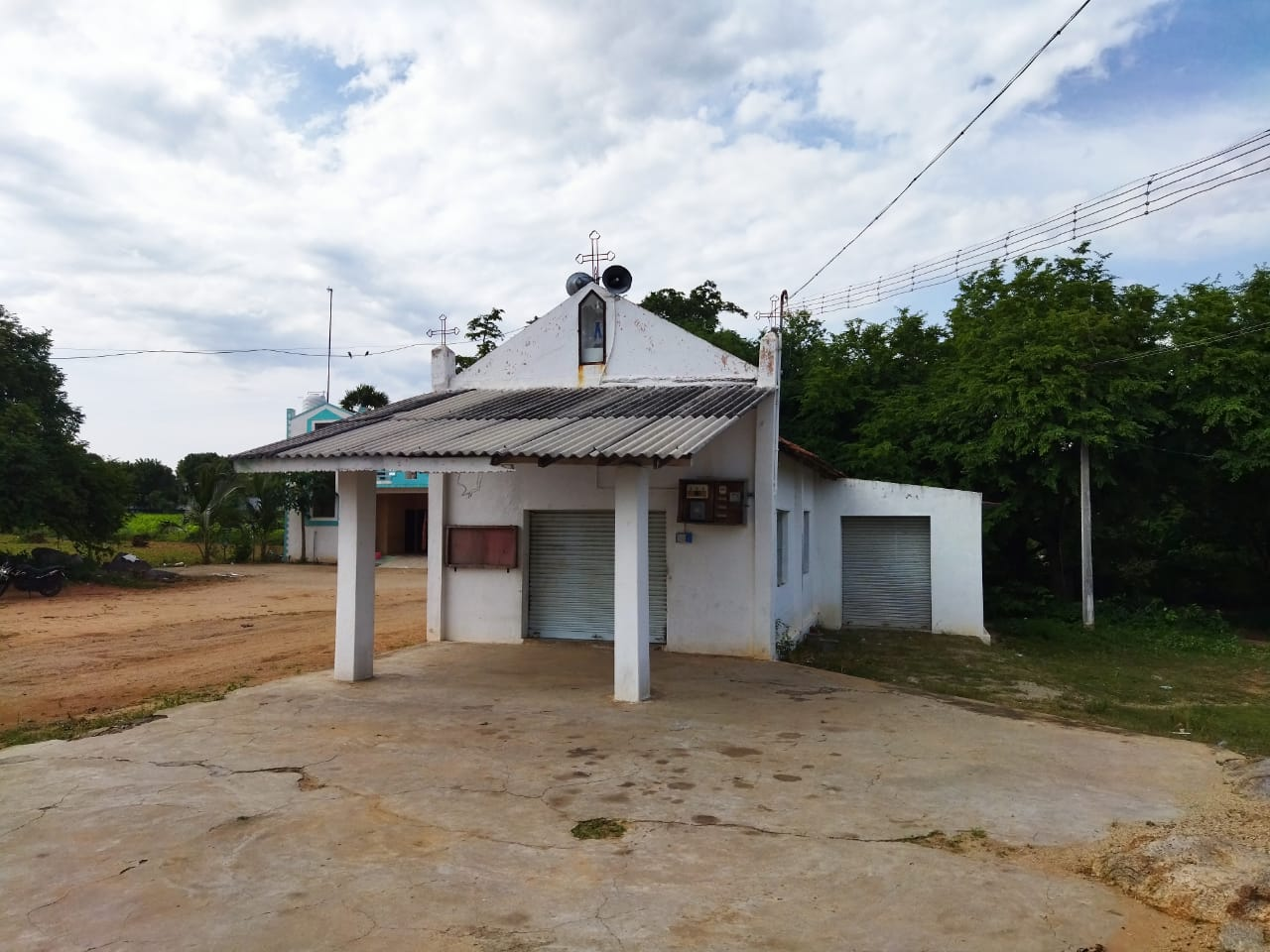
Poondi Madha Chapel, Rayapanoor

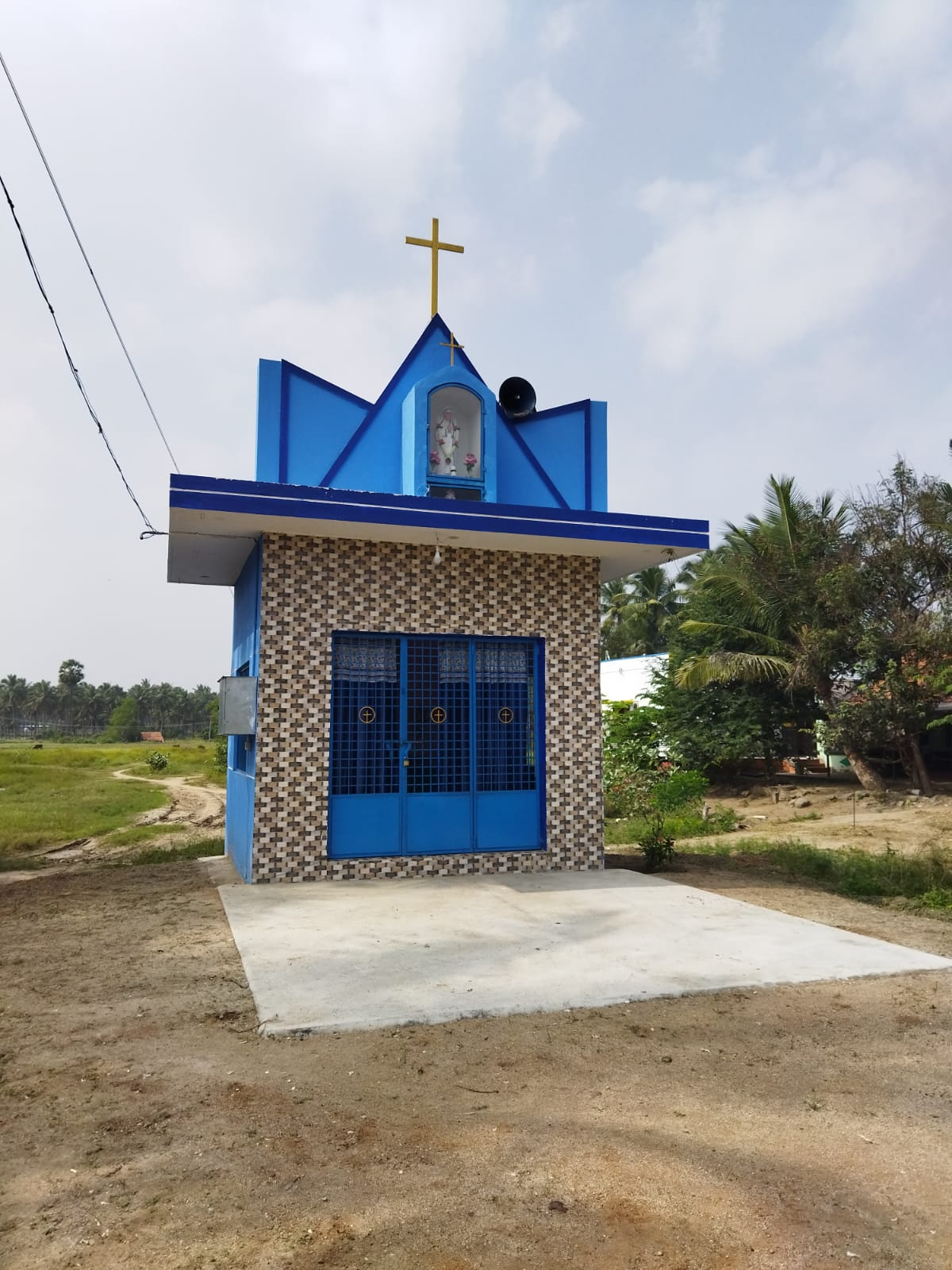
Mother Teresa Chapel, Annai Teresa Nagar, Elathagiri
source : aultabulta

== See also ==
- Roman Catholic Diocese of Dharmapuri
- Vinnarasi Madha Church, Kandikuppam
- Our Lady of Fatima Church, Krishnagiri
- St. Antony's Church, Sundampatti
