= Kandikuppam =

Kandikuppam Kandhikuppam
- village
- Location in Tamil Nadu, India
- Coordinates: 12.54271°N 78.3107°E
- Country: India
- State: Tamil Nadu
- District: Krishnagiri

Government
  - Type: State Assembly Constituency
  - Body: Village Panchayat
  - Member of Legislative Assembly: V.RAJENDRAN(AIADMK)
- Elevation: 533 m (1,749 ft)

Population (2011)
  - Total: 5,734

Languages
  - Official: Tamil
- Time zone: UTC+5:30 (IST)
- PIN: 635 108
- Telephone code: (91)4343
- Vehicle registration: TN-24
- Website: http://www.krishnagiri.tn.nic.in/links.htm

Kandikuppam is a panchayat in Bargur Block, Krishnagiri district in the state of Tamil Nadu, India. The economy is dependent on mango cultivation. Chennai is the state capital for Kandikuppam village. It is located around 223.5 kilometer away from Kandikuppam.. The other nearest state capital from Kandikuppam is Bangalore and its distance is 93.7 km. The other surrounding state capitals are Bangalore 93.7 km., Pondicherry 178.4 km., Thiruvananthapuram 463.4 km. Kandikuppam is located along Chennai – Krishnagiri National Highway (NH – 48).

The surrounding nearby villages and its distance from Kandikuppam are Achamangalam 2.6 km, Kurumber Theru 1.9 km, Thandavanpallam 1.5 km, Varattanapalli 4.3 km, Karakuppam 5.4 km, Bargur 6.6 km, Thogarapalli 6.7 km, Jagadevi 6.9 km, Mallapadi 8.0 km, Oppathavadi 10.1 km, Valasagoundanoor 21.9 km, Jingalkathirampatti 27.1 km, Parandapalli 28.5 km, Kottagaram.

== Schools in and around Kandikuppam ==
Kandikuppam nearest schools has been listed as follows.

- St Xaviers middle school
- Government Primary School Kurumber Theru 1.9 km.
- Kingsley Gardens Matric Hr Sec School Kandhikuppam 0.6 km.
- St Antonys Hr Sec School 1.8 km.
- St Antony's Elamentry School 1.8 km.
- St Joseph's Convent School And Hospital 1.9 km.
- Varatanapali Govt Hr Sec School School 3.5 km.

== Religious places ==
Sri Bhairava Nilayam is Kalabhairava temple in Kandikuppam become one of the tourist place in Kandikuppam, Krishnagiri District.

Vinnarasi Madha Church also famous among Catholic Christians around this village.

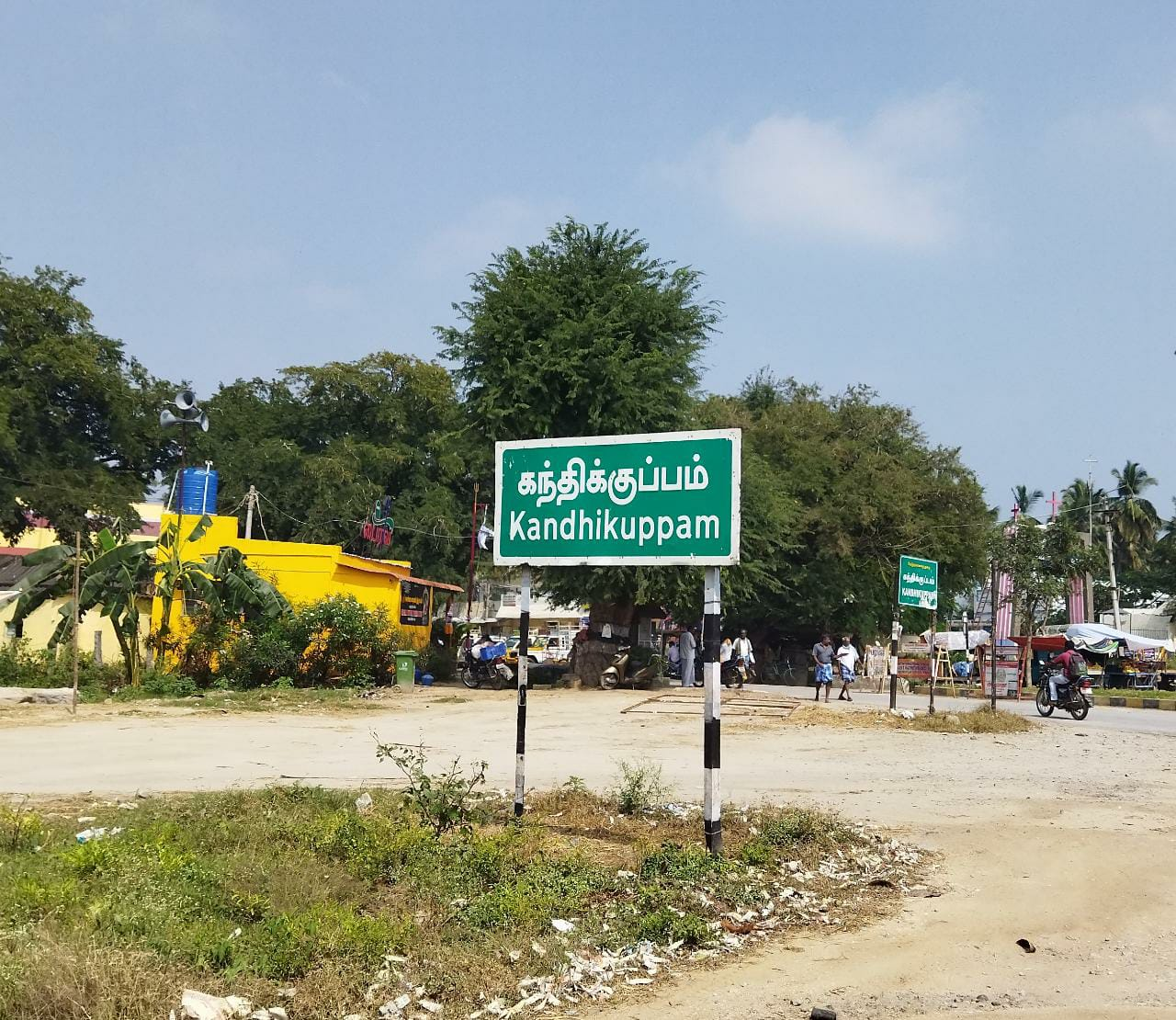
Kandukuppam Village Sign Board present in India National Highway 48

== Transport Facilities ==
Kandikuppam is located along National Highway 48 (NH 48), which connects Chennai and Bangaluru. The highway provides road access to nearby towns and districts, including Krishnagiri, Bargur, Tirupattur, Vaniyambadi, Natrampalli, and Vellore. The area is served by government and private bus services.

== Nearest airport to Kandikuppam ==
Kandikuppam's nearest airport is Hosur Aerodrome situated at 60.3 km distance. Few more airports around Kandikuppam are as follows.

- Hosur Aerodrome 60.3 km.
- HAL Airport 83.3 km.
- Salem Airport 88.9 km.

== Nearest districts to Kandikuppam ==
The other nearest district headquarters is Krishnagiri situated at 11 km distance from Kandikuppam . Surrounding districts from Kandikuppam are as follows.

- Dharmapuri district 48.3 km.
- Kolar district 69.0 km.
- Vellore district 34.00 km.
- Tiruvannamalai district 93.5 km.
- Salem district 97.7 km.
