= Bargur block =

Revenue block in Tamil Nadu, in India

Coordinates: 12.55°N 78.37°E

The Bargur block is a revenue block in the Krishnagiri district of Tamil Nadu, India. It has a total of 36 panchayat villages.
