= Kambainallur =

- Panchayat Town
- Location in Tamil Nadu, India
- Coordinates: 12.207°N 78.319°E
- Country: India
- State: Tamil Nadu
- Region: Kongu Nadu
- District: Dharmapuri
- Taluk: Karimangalam

Area
  - Total: 7.2 km^{2} (2.8 sq mi)
- Elevation: 412 m (1,352 ft)

Population (2011)
  - Total: 12,194
  - Density: 1,700/km^{2} (4,400/sq mi)

Languages
  - Official: Tamil
- Time zone: UTC+5:30 (IST)
- Postal code: 635202
- Vehicle registration: TN 29Z(Harur)

Kambainallur is a panchayat town in karimangalam taluk of Dharmapuri district in the Indian state of Tamil Nadu.

== Demographics ==
As of 2011 Indian census figures, Kambainallur had a population of 12,194. Males constitute 52% of the population and females 48%. Kambainallur has an average literacy rate of 70.69%, lower than the national average of 80.09%: male literacy is 78.28%, and female literacy is 62.77%. In Kambainallur, 13% of the population is under 6 years of age.l
