= Achamangalam =

- Village
- Location in Tamil Nadu, India Achamangalam (India)
- Coordinates: 12.523904°N 78.31972°E
- Country: India
- State: Tamil Nadu
- District: Tirupattur

Population (2011)
  - Total: 4,179

Languages
  - Official: Tamil
- Time zone: UTC+5:30 (IST)

Achamangalam is a village in the Tirupattur taluk of Tirupattur district, Tamil Nadu, India.
