= Elathagiri =

Elathagiri எலத்தகிரி
- Village
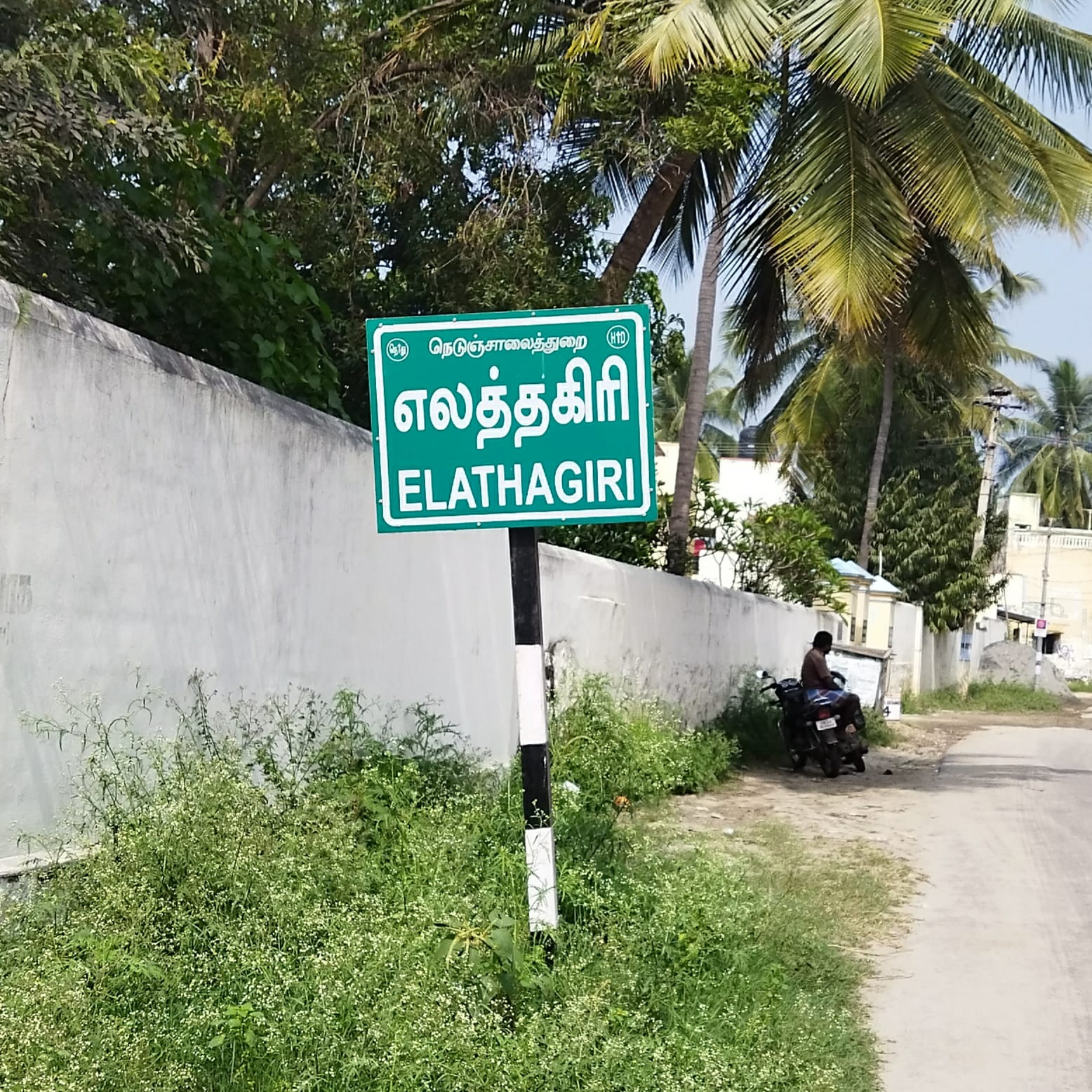
- A Roadsign board located in Elathagiri

- Location of Elthagiri in Tamilnadu
- Coordinates: 12°33′05″N 78°17′39″E
- Country: India
- State: Tamil Nadu
- District: Krishnagiri
- Block: Bargur
- Panchayat: Palepalli

Languages
  - Official: Tamil
  - Other: Telugu
- PIN: 635108
- Post Office: Elathagiri

Elathagiri or Eluthagiri is a small village located in Krishnagiri district in the state of Tamil Nadu, India. This village is located 3 km away from Bangalore - Chennai Highway also 9 km away from the Krishnagiri District's capital, also called Krishnagiri. Catholic missionaries started schools in the village more than 100 years ago.

== Education ==
- St. Antony's Primary School
- St. Antony's Higher Secondary School
- Gonzaga Matric Higher Secondary School
- Government Higher Secondary School, Orappam (4 km from Elathagiri)
- Sivagamiammal CBSC Higher Secondary School (5 km from Elathagiri)
- Gonzaga Arts and Science College for Women

== Religious Place ==
- Adaikala Madha Church, Elathagiri (Our lady of Refuge)
- Holy Family Church (Paarai Kovil)
- CSI Good Shepherd Church
- Karur Mariamman Temple
- Sri Lakshmi Narayana Temple
- St. Joseph Church, Kathampallam
- Sagayamadha Church, Sagayapuram

== Official Place ==
- Elathagiri Post Office
- State Bank of India, Elathagiri Branch
