= Our Lady of Mount Carmel Church, B Pallipatti =

Roman Catholic Church in Tamil Nadu, India

Our Lady of Mt. Carmel Church
- Carmel Church
- கார்மல் அன்னை ஆலயம்
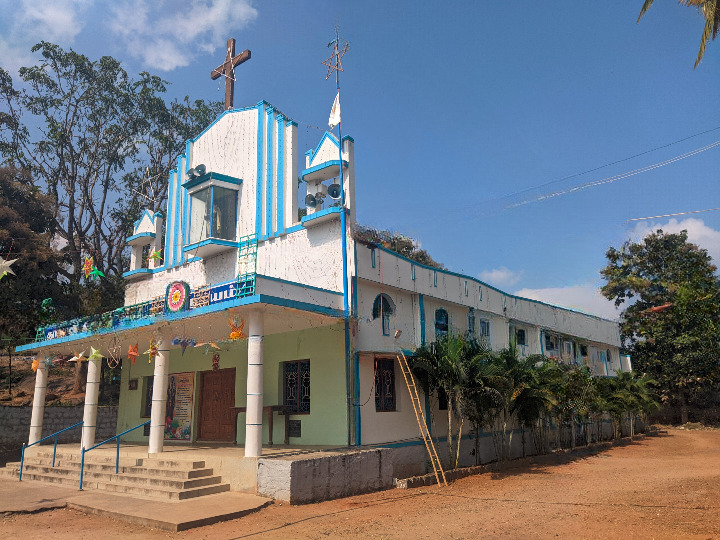
- Side View of this church
- Our Lady of Mt. Carmel Church
- 11.94809°N 78.2798°E
- Location: B Pallipatti, Dharmapuri Dt, Tamil Nadu
- Country: India
- Denomination: Catholic
- Religious institute: Jesuit

History
- Status: Parish church
- Founded: 1938
- Founder: Fr. Charles Devin
- Dedication: St. Mary

Architecture
- Functional status: Active
- Architectural type: Church
- Style: Medieval
- Completed: 2001

Administration
- Archdiocese: Pondicherry and Cuddalore
- Diocese: Dharmapuri
- Deanery: Dharmapuri
- Parish: B Pallipatti

Clergy
- Archbishop: Francis Kalist
- Bishop: Lawrence Pius Dorairaj
- Priest: Fr. A. Irudayaraj

Our Lady of Mt. Carmel Church is catholic parish church in B. Pallipatti village near Bommidi in Dharmapuri district in Tamil Nadu, India. This parish is famous for its Jesus life story open theater drama Maasattra Ratham performed every second Friday after Easter. Also this is one of the oldest parish in Dharamapuri Diocese.

== History ==
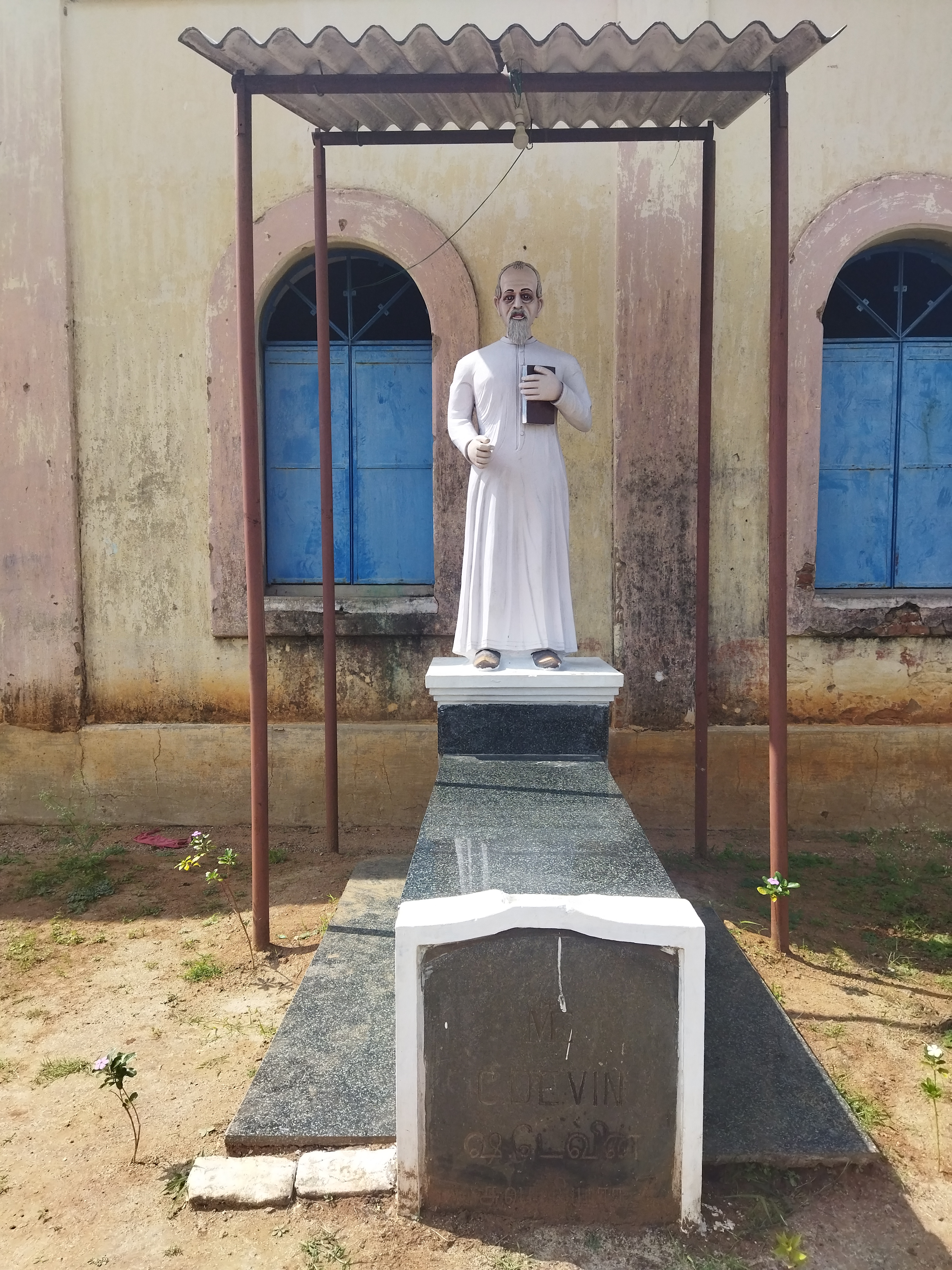
Fr. Charles Devin's Graveyard with Statue

In the records, before 1750 Catholics lived in this village, probably because of missionaries from Mysore. This village is also under the service of Kovilur priest Fr. Timothy Xavier S.J., who served in Laligam during his time Fr. Marian Fransic, MEP and parish priest of Kovilur Church, mentioned in his diary that in 1850 there were 288 Christ followers around Pallipatti village. In 1858, Fr. Gouyon baptized seven families in this village. From 1861 to 1864, Kovilur Parish priest Fr. Thiriyon baptized 23 disciples in this village.

As Salem diocese was separated from Kumbakonam diocese in 1930, Pallipatti became a parish and Fr. Charles Devin became the first parish priest. During his period, around 102 catholic families were lived around this village. Catholics of Bommidi, Pappireddipatti, Kurubarahalli and Thenkaraikottai are comes under this parish. Fr. Devin started and completed the construction of the Church around 1938; he also began an elementary school in 1932 because of his commitment to education to the local people. With 15 years of service in this village, Fr. Devin died in Pallipatti on March, 11th 1945. His graveyard can be found to the right of the church.

The parish priest Fr. M. Arulsamy started building a new church and priest house for B.Pallipatti parish and the construction begin in January 18, 2001 this is due to the insufficient space of the old church. Later on December 16, 2001 the new and the present parish church were dedicated to public.

== Lourde Grotto ==
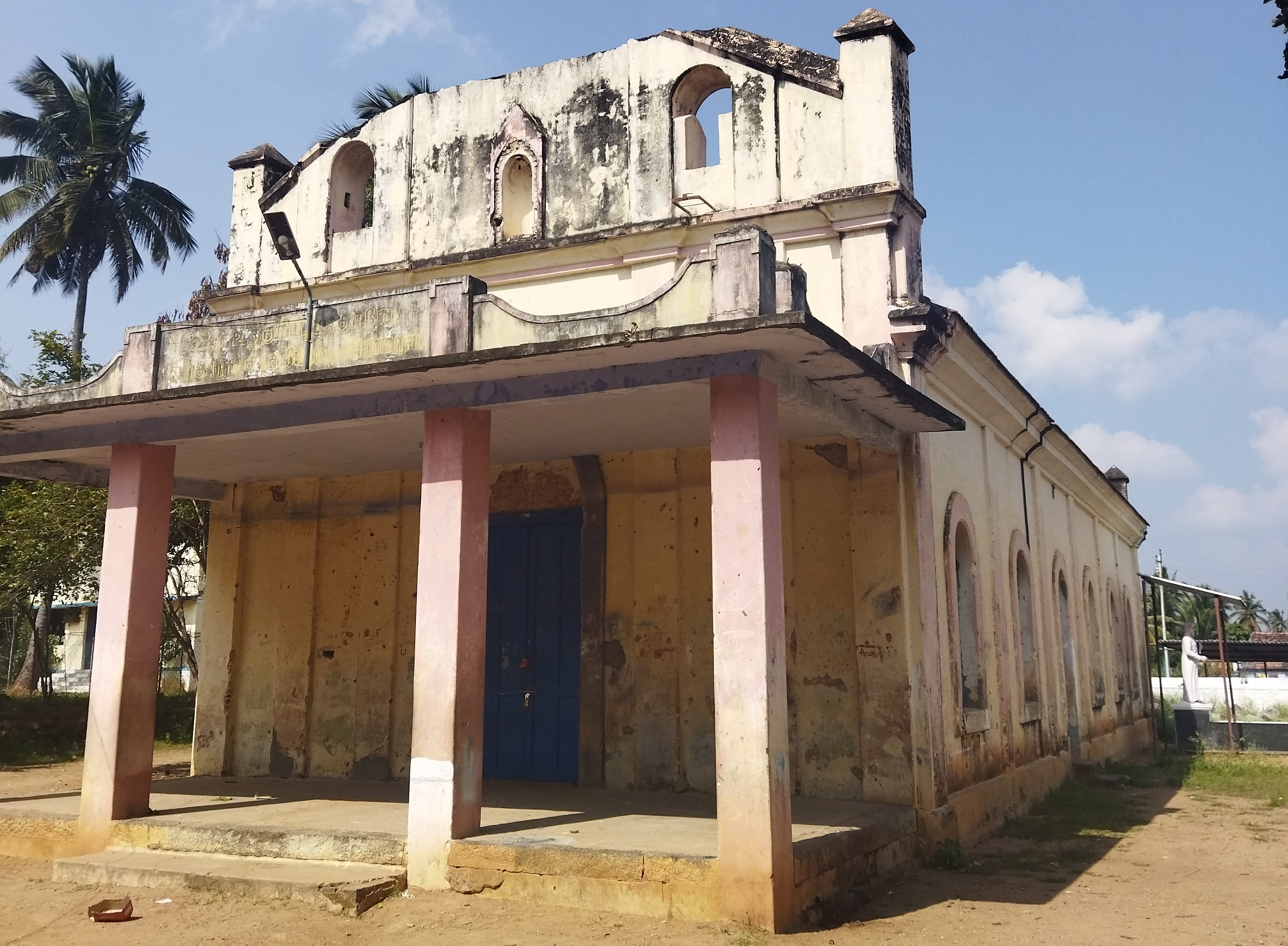
Old Church

As an act of commemoration of the 100th anniversary of the apparition of Our Lady of Lourdes in 1958, Parish Priest Fr. T.C. Joseph erected a grotto on the west side of Mallikarjuna mountain with a statue of St. Mary the Virgin standing four feet high. This was blessed and opened by bishop of Salem.

Fr. Mathew Pulickal was the next parish priest to put many Jesus crucifixion statues on this mountain, which is still used during Lenten days for praying the "way of the cross". He also built a Rosary staircase for the mountain. February 11, 1969 with the approval of district collector and Salem bishop, Fr. Thomas Seerangsira developed a residential area next to the mountain and named it as Lourdepuram. The famous Jesus life story open theater drama Maasattra Ratham has been performed near this mountain since 1970. Later in 2008 as Jubilee year a chapel was built down front of this mountain and masses are conduction here ever saturday.

== Education ==
Founded by Fr. Charles Devin in 1932, St. Mary Primary School was converted into a middle school in 1952 and a high school in 1992. Due to insufficient space, a new school was built opposite the church under the name Mount Carmel High School. In 2008, the school became Mount Carmel High Secondary School. In 2003, SMMI sisters opened an English Medium School in Lourdepuram near B.Pallipatti. In 2005, they built a convent next to the school and started a medical clinic for the villagers.

== See also ==
- B Pallipatti
- St. Francis Xavier Church, Kovilur
- Our Lady of Mount Carmel Church, Thenkaraikottai
- Our Lady of Mount Carmel
- Our Lady of Lourdes
