= St. Antony's Church, Bommidi =

Roman Catholic Church in Tamil Nadu, India

St. Antony 's Church
- St. Anthony of Padua Church
- கோடி அற்புதர் புனித அந்தோனியார் திருத்தம்
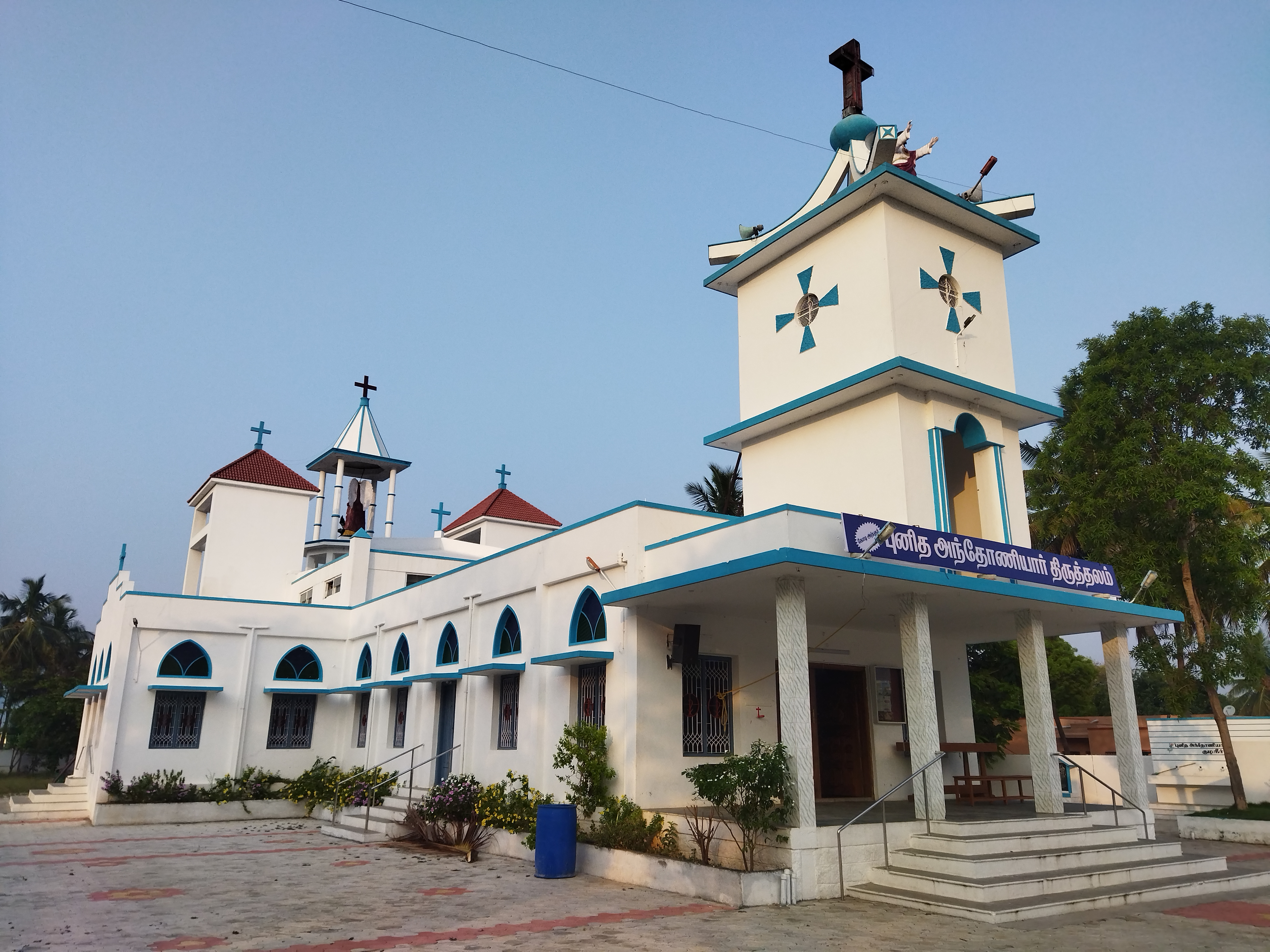
- Side View of this church
- St. Antony 's Church
- 11.9801°N 78.2486°E
- Location: Bommidi, Dharmapuri district, Tamil Nadu
- Country: India
- Denomination: Catholic
- Religious institute: Jesuit

History
- Status: Parish church
- Founded: 1900
- Founder: Fr. Fernand Antonin Legion MEP
- Dedication: Jesus

Architecture
- Functional status: Active
- Architectural type: Church
- Style: Modern Architecture
- Groundbreaking: 2001
- Completed: 2002

Administration
- Archdiocese: Pondicherry and Cuddalore
- Diocese: Dharmapuri
- Deanery: Harur
- Parish: Bommidi

Clergy
- Archbishop: Francis Kalist
- Bishop: Lawrence Pius Dorairaj
- Priest: Fr. George Jackson Louis

St. Antony's Church is a Roman Catholic church situated in Bommidi, Dharmapuri district, Tamil Nadu, India. This church holds great prominence among the Christians, leading to its elevation as a Shrine by the Dharmapuri Diocese.

== History ==
The history of Catholicism in Bommidi dates back to the late 19th century. During those days Mallapuram was a village presented next to the Bommidi village, Till now in government village revenue record the Mallapuram name is present. But Bommidi was expanded as town so the Mallapuram became one of an area of Bommidi and this name was no longer used. During the famine years between 1861 and 1864, Rev. Fr. Joseph Trione, a priest from Kovilur, visited Bommidi and provided assistance to the people during the crisis. As a result, nearly 98 individuals in Mallapuram (Bommidi) received baptism. In 1972, François-Jean-Marie Laouënan Bishop Laouënan of Pondicherry Archdiocese reported that there were around 80 Catholics residing in Malappuram. In 1990, a chapel was constructed in Bommidi, which is also mentioned in the Salem Diocese records along with the building of chapels in Seliampatti and Gollapatti between 1899. Until 1930, the Mallapuram Chapel was under the supervision of the Kovilur Parish priest. However, when B.Pallipatti Church was established as a new parish in 1930, the Bommidi Chapel became a substation of B. Pallipatti. The history books also highlight the participation of two Indian freedom fighters named Arokiasami and Rayyappan from Bommidi, the "August Revolution" against British India in 1942. This shows the presence of Catholics in Bommidi.

In 1956, during the tenure of B.Pallipatti Parish priest TC Joseph constructed a church in the name St. Antony's and also along with this he constructed a parish house in Bommidi. In 1957 Bommidi became a parish church and Fr. Fernand Antonin Legion MEP, who became the first parish priest of Bommidi. As per Salem Diocese records indicate that Bommidi became a parish in 1955, but as per the baptism record shows the parish started in 1957. Later next to the old church 3.25 acres of land were acquired in 1958. Fr. Legion, during his tenure in Attur, he built a Dispensary there, which he later entrusted to the SMMI sisters. Similarly, a Dispensary named St. Teresa's was established in Bommidi, and he requested SMMI sisters to manage it. In response to the priest's request, the SMMI sisters (Salesian Missionaries of Mary Immaculate) arrived in Bommidi on October 15, 1958, to provide their services to the villagers, including primary education for children.

== Church ==
In 2001, due to inadequate space of old church, plans were made to construct a new church (present church) in Bommidi under the guidance of parish priest Fr. Adiruban. Groundbreaking for the new church took place on February 4, 2001, then it completed and inaugurated on June 13, 2002, by Bishop Joseph Anthony Irudayaraj of the Dharmapuri Diocese. Additionally, a parish house was built in 2003, and an Oratory of Sermon of Saint Anthony to the Fish was established behind the church. Until 1997, St. Roch Church in K. Morur served as a substation of Bommidi. When the Dharmapuri Diocese was formed from the Salem Diocese, the K. Morur Church was handed over to Kongrapatti Parish. In early 2000s Kalaignar Nagar, a housing colony was formed by government this causes many catholic settlements happened in this area with the help of government a land was acquired for the church and Periyanayagi Madha Church was built and became a substation church of Bommidi Parish.

== See also ==
- Our Lady of Mount Carmel Church, B Pallipatti
- St. Francis Xavier Church, Kovilur
