= M. K. Mariappan =

M. K. Marippan
- எம். கே. மாரியப்பன்

Member of the Madras Legislative Assembly
- In office 1957–1962
- Constituency: Harur

Personal details
- Born: 11 April 1910 (age 116) Bommidi, Pappireddipatti, Dharmapuri district, Tamil Nadu, India
- Party: Indian National Congress
- Occupation: Politician

M. K. Marippan (born 11 April 1910) was an Indian politician and a former member of the Tamil Nadu Legislative Assembly. He was elected to the Madras Legislative Assembly as an Indian National Congress candidate from the Harur constituency in the 1957 election. He hailed from Bommidi, Pappireddipatti in present-day Dharmapuri district.

== Electoral Performance ==
=== 1957 ===
1957 Madras Legislative Assembly election: Harur
Party	Candidate	Votes	%	±%
INC	P. M. Munusami Gounder	26,172	23.13	3.29%
INC	M. K. Mariappan	25,676	22.68	
Independent	T. Ponnusami	14,133	12.49	
Independent	C. Theerthagiri (Sc)	13,689	12.10	
CPI	Poosami (Sc)	10,682	9.44	
Independent	Desai Venugopal Naidu	9,180	8.11	
Independent	K. Sivaprakasam Mudali	5,661	5.00	
Independent	P. Subramania Chetty	4,818	4.26	
Independent	Podujanopagari T. V. Anganna Chettiar	3,161	2.79	
Margin of victory		12,039	11.46	
Turnout		113,172	61.26	−11.97%
Registered electors		184,747		
INC gain from Independent		Swing	-5.01	

- 2 member constituency
