= Annamalai =

Annamalai or variants, may refer to:

== Film and television ==
- Annaamalai, a 1992 Indian Tamil-language film by Suresh Krissna
- Annamalai (2002 TV series), an Indian Tamil-language soap opera
- Annamalai (2014 TV series), an Indian Tamil-language TV historical soap opera
  - Annamalai (season 3), 2015

== Places ==
- Annamalai Hills, or Arunachala, in Tamil Nadu, India
  - Annamalaiyar Temple
- Annamalai University, in Chidambaram, Tamil Nadu, India

== People ==
- S. Rm. M. Annamalai Chettiar (1881-1948), Indian industrialist and banker
- K. Annamalai (born 1984), ex-IPS officer and Indian politician
- K. Annamalai (AIADMK politician) (born 1948), Indian politician from AIADMK
- M. Annamalai (politician) (fl. from 1979), Indian politician
- M. Annamalai (scientist) (born 1945), Indian space scientist
- S. Annamalai (fl. 1991), Indian politician

== See also ==
- Anaimalai (disambiguation)
  - Anaimalai Hills, or Elephant Mountains, a range of mountains in Kerala, India
- Tiruvannamalai (disambiguation)
