= M. Annamalai =

M. Annamalai may refer to:

- M. Annamalai (politician), Indian politician
- M. Annamalai (scientist) (born 1945), Indian space scientist
