= Our Lady of Mount Carmel Church, Thenkaraikottai =

Roman Catholic Church in Tamil Nadu, India

Our Lady of Mt. Carmel Church
- Our Lady of Mount Carmel Church
- Carmel Mary Church
- கார்மல் அன்னை ஆலயம்
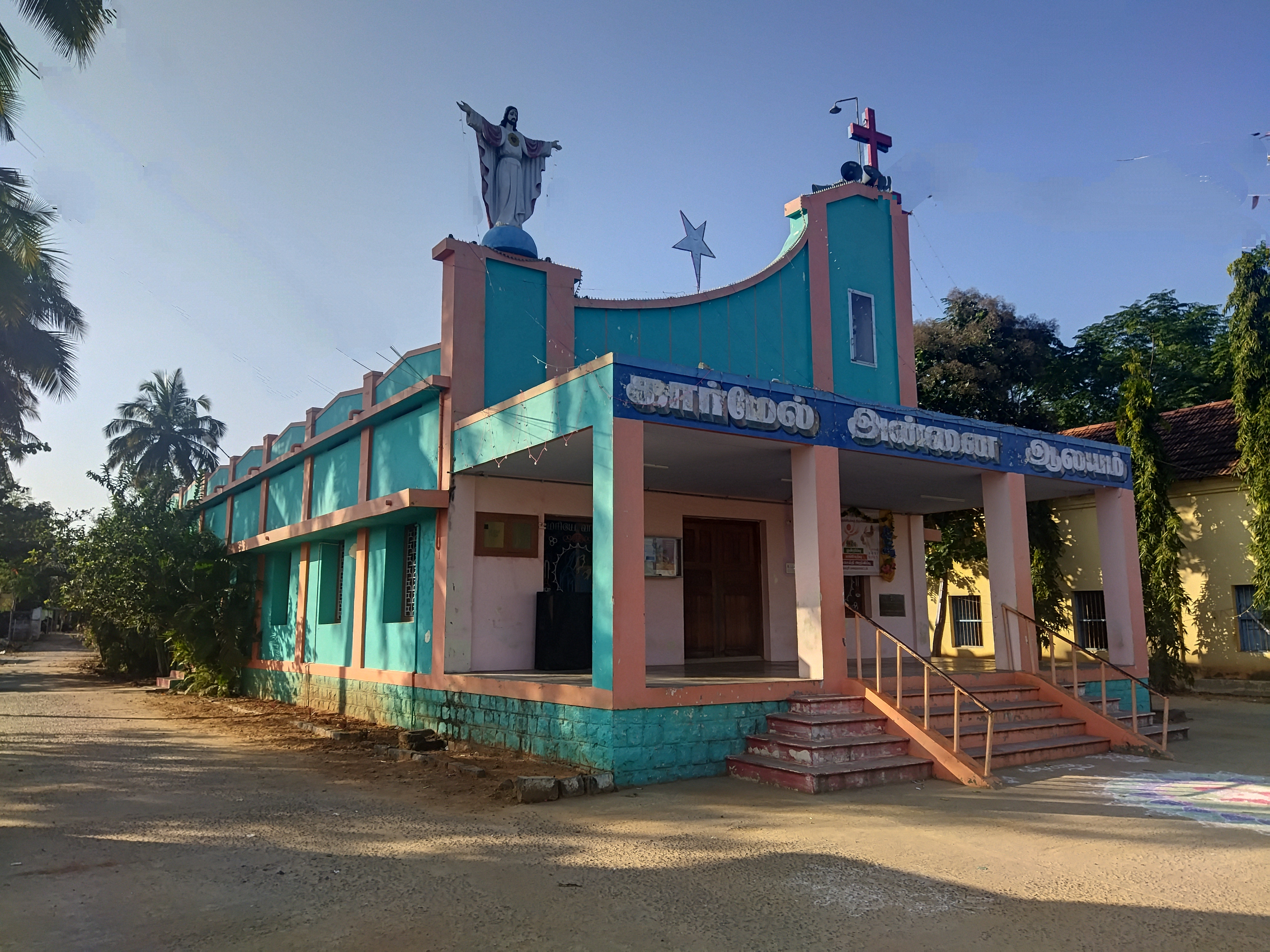
- Side View of this church
- Our Lady of Mt. Carmel Church
- 12.0104°N 78.3925°E
- Location: Thenkaraikottai, Dharmapuri Dt, Tamil Nadu
- Country: India
- Denomination: Catholic
- Religious institute: Jesuit

History
- Status: Parish church
- Founded: 1930
- Founder: Fr. Charles Devin
- Dedication: Our Lady of Mount Carmel

Architecture
- Functional status: Active
- Architectural type: Church
- Groundbreaking: 1991
- Completed: 1992

Administration
- Archdiocese: Pondicherry and Cuddalore
- Diocese: Dharmapuri
- Deanery: Harur
- Parish: Thenkaraikottai

Clergy
- Archbishop: Francis Kalist
- Bishop: Lawrence Pius Dorairaj
- Priest: Fr. A. Irudayaraj

Our Lady of Mount Carmel Church is a Roman Catholic parish church in Thenkaraikottai, in the state of Tamil Nadu, India. It comes under the administration of Dharmapuri Diocese.

== History ==
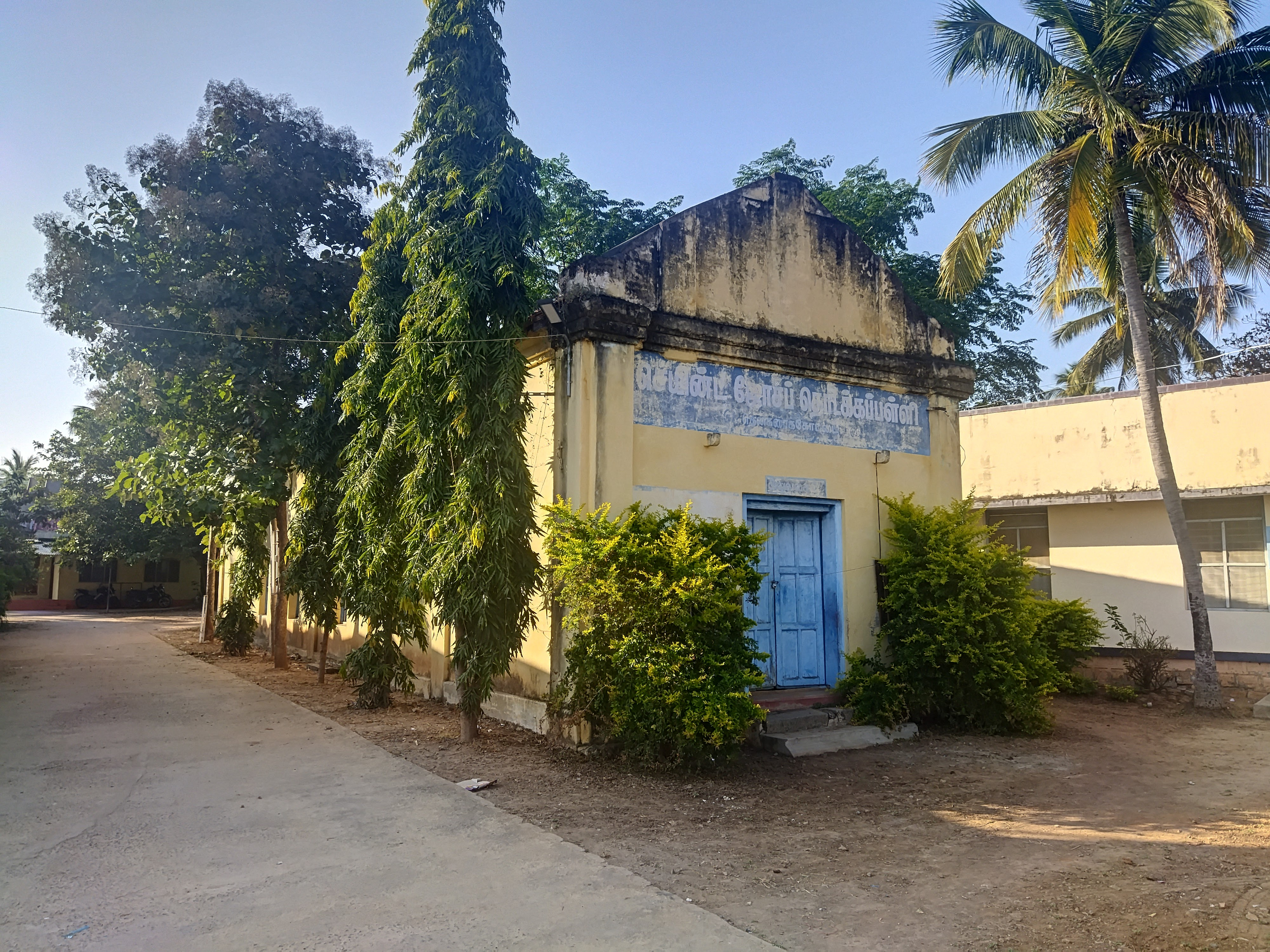
The old Church which not in use

The church is situated in the hamlet of Fatima Nagar, adjacent to the village of Thenkaraikottai.

There are no official records or evidence regarding the origin of Catholics in Thenkaraikottai, however, a book written by Fr. M.S. Joseph in 1840 mentions this place. Fr. Mariyan Franc MEP, a priest from Kovilur parish, also made note of Catholic families residing in the area. In the 1920s, Fr. Sievek MEP, a priest from Kovilur, constructed a Priest House in Thenkaraikottai. In 1930, Thenkaraikottai became a sub-parish of B.Pallipatti parish church, when Fr. Charles Devin MEP, the parish priest of B. Pallipatti, established a church here.

On June 5, 1949, this church became a parish church, with Fr. Reval MEP serving as its first parish priest. During his tenure, the St. Joseph Elementary School was founded to provide education for the local children. In 2004, St. Joseph Primary School was upgraded to a high school. Since 1965, the Gonzaga Sisters of Pondicherry have served in this church. In 1973, Fr. Jegaraj constructed the current Parish House.

Under the guidance of Parish Priest Fr. Arulsamy the current church building was built, and blessed by Salem Diocese Bishop Michael Bosco Duraisamy on January 21, 1992. Subsequently, during Fr. George's tenure in 2010, a bell tower was erected next to the church.

== See also ==
- B Pallipatti
- St. Francis Xavier Church, Kovilur
- Our Lady of Mount Carmel Church, B Pallipatti
