= P. Dillibabu =

Indian politician

P. Dillibabu (born 12 February 1965) is an Indian politician and was a member of the 14th Tamil Nadu Legislative Assembly from the Harur constituency, which is reserved for candidates from the Scheduled Castes. He represented the Communist Party of India (Marxist) party. Previously he represented the same constituency as a Communist Party of India (Marxist) member in the 2006 elections.

The elections of 2016 resulted in the Harur constituency being won by R. Murugan. A deal between the CPI(M) and the Viduthalai Chiruthaigal Katchi resulted in Dillibabu swapping that constituency for the Thiru. Vi. Ka. Nagar constituency, which was won by P. Sivakumar.

Dillibabu was born in Poorivakkam on 12 February 1965. He has a BA degree and is married with two children. He has been a State Committee Member of the Tamil Nadu Farmers Association and State Vice-president of the Tamil Nadu Malaivazh Makkal Association.
