= Anaimalai (disambiguation) =

Anaimalai is a town in Coimbatore district, Tamil Nadu, India.

Anaimalai may also refer to:

- Anaimalai taluk, sub-district of Coimbatore district, Tamil Nadu, India, contains the town
- Anamalai Block, a division of the taluk
- Anaimalai Hills or Elephant Mountains, southern subrange of the Western Ghats in Kerala and Tamil Nadu, India
  - Anamalai Tiger Reserve, wildlife sanctuary and national park in Tamil Nadu, India
  - Anaimalai dravidogecko or Dravidogecko anamallensis, species of lizard
  - Anaimalai earth snake or Uropeltis macrorhyncha, species of snake
  - Anamalai loach, species of fish

== See also ==
- Annamalai (disambiguation)
