= V. Sampathkumar =

Indian politician

Member of the Tamil Nadu Legislative Assembly
- Incumbent
- Assumed office 19 May 2019
- Preceded by: R. Murugan
- Constituency: Harur

Personal details
- Party: All India Anna Dravida Munnetra Kazhagam
- Parent: Vediyappan (father)

Vediyappan Sampathkumar is an Indian politician and is Member of the Legislative Assembly of Tamil Nadu. He was elected to the Tamil Nadu legislative assembly as an All India Anna Dravida Munnetra Kazhagam candidate from Harur constituency in the by-election in 2019.

== Electoral performance ==
2021 Tamil Nadu Legislative Assembly election: Harur
Party	Candidate	Votes	%	±%
AIADMK	V. Sampathkumar	99,061	50.46	16.50
CPI(M)	A. Kumar	68,699	34.99	
AMMK	R. Murugan	14,327	7.30	
NTK	K. Keerthana	10,950	5.58	5.25
NOTA	Nota	2,249	1.15	0.05
Margin of victory		30,362	15.47	9.46
Turnout		196,316	78.49	−5.81
Rejected ballots		423	0.22	
Registered electors		250,120		
AIADMK hold		Swing	16.50	
