= V. Krishnamoorthy =

Indian politician

V. Krishnamoorthy was elected to the Tamil Nadu Legislative Assembly from the Harur constituency in the 2001 elections from Communist Party of India (Marxist).
