= Tiruvannamalai (disambiguation) =

Tiruvannamalai is a Hindu pilgrimage town in the south Indian state of Tamil Nadu.

Tiruvannamalai may also refer to:

- Thiruvannamalai (film), a 2008 film
- Tiruvannamalai district, a district in Tamil Nadu
- Tiruvannamalai block, a revenue block
- Tiruvannamalai taluk, a taluk of Tiruvannamalai district
- Tiruvannamalai division, a revenue division
- Tiruvannamalai (Lok Sabha constituency), a Lok Sabha constituency in Tamil Nadu
- Tiruvannamalai (state assembly constituency), a state assembly constituency in Tiruvannamalai district of Tamil Nadu

== See also ==
- Annamalai (disambiguation)
