= Anamalai Block =

Anamalai block is a revenue block of Coimbatore district of the Indian state of Tamil Nadu. This revenue block consist of 19 panchayat villages.

== List of Panchayat Villages ==
They are,

SI.No	Panchayat Village
1	Angalakurichi
2	Arthanaripalayam
3	Authupollachi
4	Divansapudur
5	Jallipatti
6	Kaliapuram
7	Kambalapatti
8	Kariyanchettipalayam
9	M.G.Pudur
10	Periapodu
11	Pethanaickenur
12	Pilchinnampalayam
13	Ramanamudalipdr
14	Somandurai
15	Subbegoundenpdr
16	Thathur
17	Thenchittur
18	Thensangampalayam
19	V.K.Nagoor
