= Vedammal =

Indian politician

Vedammal was elected to the Tamil Nadu Legislative Assembly from the Harur constituency, which was reserved for candidates from the Scheduled Castes, in the 1996 elections. She was a candidate of the Dravida Munnetra Kazhagam (DMK) party.

Vedammal is the dmk candidate for 2021 elections.
