= Harur Assembly constituency =

State Legislative Assembly Constituency in Tamil Nadu

Coordinates: 12.052°N 78.4855°E

Harur
- Constituency No. 61 for the Tamil Nadu Legislative Assembly

Constituency details
- Country: India
- Region: South India
- State: Tamil Nadu
- District: Dharmapuri
- Lok Sabha constituency: Dharmapuri
- Established: 1951
- Total electors: 2,45,971
- Reservation: SC

Member of Legislative Assembly
- 17th Tamil Nadu Legislative Assembly
- Incumbent V. Sampathkumar
- Party: AIADMK
- Alliance: NDA
- Elected year: 2026

Harur is a state legislative assembly constituency in Dharmapuri district, Tamil Nadu, India, which includes the city of Harur. Its State Assembly Constituency number is 61. The seat is reserved for candidates from the Scheduled Castes. It is part of the Dharmapuri Lok Sabha constituency for national elections to the Parliament of India. It is one of the 234 State Legislative Assembly Constituencies in Tamil Nadu, in India.

== Members of Legislative Assembly ==
Year	Member	Political party
Madras State
1952	A. Duraisamy Gounder	Indian National Congress
1957	M. K. Mariappan	Indian National Congress
1962	C. Manickam	Dravida Munnetra Kazhagam
1967	N. Theerthagiri	Indian National Congress
Tamil Nadu
1971	S. A. Chinnaraju	Dravida Munnetra Kazhagam
1977	M. Annamalai	Communist Party of India (Marxist)
1980	C. Sabapathy	All India Anna Dravida Munnetra Kazhagam
1984	R. Rajamanickam	All India Anna Dravida Munnetra Kazhagam
1989	M. Annamalai	Communist Party of India (Marxist)
1991	P. Abaranji	Indian National Congress
1996	Vedammal	Dravida Munnetra Kazhagam
2001	V. Krishnamoorthy	Communist Party of India
2006	P. Dillibabu	Communist Party of India (Marxist)
2011	P. Dillibabu	Communist Party of India (Marxist)
2016	R. Murugan	All India Anna Dravida Munnetra Kazhagam
2019^	V. Sampathkumar	All India Anna Dravida Munnetra Kazhagam
2021	V. Sampathkumar	All India Anna Dravida Munnetra Kazhagam
2026	V. Sampathkumar	All India Anna Dravida Munnetra Kazhagam

== Election results ==
Vote share of winning candidates
2026	34.32%
2021	50.46%
2019 by-election	45.10%
2016	33.96%
2011	51.71%
2006	45.70%
2001	53.04%
1996	55.59%
1991	58.56%
1989	31.68%
1984	66.96%
1980	57.66%
1977	34.69%
1971	54.26%
1967	48.09%
1962	41.33%
1957	23.13%
1952	28.14%

=== 2026 ===
2026 Tamil Nadu Legislative Assembly election: Harur
Party	Candidate	Votes	%	±%
AIADMK	Sampathkumar. V	75,523	34.32	▼16.14
DMK	Shanmugam. A	72,194	32.81	New
TVK	Rakesh. K	62,756	28.52	New
NTK	Anitha. A	5,245	2.38	▼3.20
NOTA	NOTA	782	0.36	▼0.79
Margin of victory		3,329	1.51	▼13.96
Turnout		2,20,042	89.46	▲10.97
Registered electors		2,45,971		▼4,149
AIADMK hold		Swing	▼16.14	

=== 2021 ===
2021 Tamil Nadu Legislative Assembly election: Harur
Party	Candidate	Votes	%	±%
AIADMK	V. Sampathkumar	99,061	50.46	16.50
CPI(M)	A. Kumar	68,699	34.99	
AMMK	R. Murugan	14,327	7.30	
NTK	K. Keerthana	10,950	5.58	5.25
NOTA	Nota	2,249	1.15	0.05
Margin of victory		30,362	15.47	9.46
Turnout		196,316	78.49	−5.81
Rejected ballots		423	0.22	
Registered electors		250,120		
AIADMK hold		Swing	16.50	

=== 2019 by-election ===
2019 Tamil Nadu Legislative Assembly by-elections: Harur
Party	Candidate	Votes	%	±%
AIADMK	V. Sampathkumar	88,632	45.10	
DMK	C. Krishnakumar	79,238		
Independent	R. Murugan	20,282		
NTK	P. Thileep	3,902		
NOTA	None of the Above	2,157		
Majority		9,394		
Turnout		1,96,524	83.67	
Registered electors		2,35,857		
AIADMK hold		Swing		

=== 2016 ===
2016 Tamil Nadu Legislative Assembly election: Harur
Party	Candidate	Votes	%	±%
AIADMK	R. Murugan	64,568	33.96%	
DMK	S. Rajendran	53,147	27.95%	
VCK	K. Govindhasamy	33,632	17.69%	
PMK	S. Murali	27,747	14.59%	
KMDK	K. Surulirajan	3,500	1.84%	
NOTA	None Of The Above	2,092	1.10%	
BJP	P. Vediyappan	1,948	1.02%	−1.49%
Margin of victory		11,421	6.01%	−11.63%
Turnout		190,134	84.30%	4.69%
Registered electors		225,545		
AIADMK gain from CPI(M)		Swing	-17.75%	

=== 2011 ===
2011 Tamil Nadu Legislative Assembly election: Harur
Party	Candidate	Votes	%	±%
CPI(M)	P. Dillibabu	77,703	51.71%	6.00%
VCK	B. M. Nandhan	51,200	34.07%	
Independent	P. Parthiban	5,290	3.52%	
Independent	S. Rajendran	4,844	3.22%	
BJP	K. Samikannu	3,777	2.51%	0.22%
Independent	A. Athimulam	2,149	1.43%	
Independent	T. Anbutheeban	2,119	1.41%	
IJK	S. Buddhamani	1,974	1.31%	
BSP	P. Chinnasamy	1,216	0.81%	−0.42%
Margin of victory		26,503	17.64%	8.83%
Turnout		188,764	79.61%	10.08%
Registered electors		150,272		
CPI(M) hold		Swing	6.00%	

=== 2006 ===
2006 Tamil Nadu Legislative Assembly election: Harur
Party	Candidate	Votes	%	±%
CPI(M)	P. Dillibabu	71,030	45.70%	
VCK	K. Govindasamy	57,337	36.89%	
DMDK	P. Arjunan	15,754	10.14%	
BJP	P. Ambethkar	3,566	2.29%	
Independent	V. P. Murugan	2,959	1.90%	
BSP	R. Raji	1,907	1.23%	
Independent	M. Thirumal	1,466	0.94%	
Independent	V. Kalaimani	1,392	0.90%	
Margin of victory		13,693	8.81%	−16.40%
Turnout		155,411	69.52%	10.72%
Registered electors		223,534		
CPI(M) gain from CPI		Swing	-7.34%	

=== 2001 ===
2001 Tamil Nadu Legislative Assembly election: Harur
Party	Candidate	Votes	%	±%
CPI	V. Krishnamoorthy	70,433	53.04%	
DMK	D. Periyasamy	36,954	27.83%	−27.76%
Independent	M. Palani	13,819	10.41%	
Independent	V. Venkatesh	3,191	2.40%	
MDMK	M. Budthiran	2,894	2.18%	
Independent	V. K. Periasami	1,961	1.48%	
Independent	K. Sakkan	1,664	1.25%	
Independent	V. Sivaraman	1,173	0.88%	
Independent	K. Sivanathan	692	0.52%	
Margin of victory		33,479	25.21%	−3.47%
Turnout		132,781	58.80%	−6.94%
Registered electors		225,920		
CPI gain from DMK		Swing	-2.55%	

=== 1996 ===
1996 Tamil Nadu Legislative Assembly election: Harur
Party	Candidate	Votes	%	±%
DMK	Vedammal	70,561	55.59%	
INC	J. Natesan	34,158	26.91%	−31.65%
RPI	P. V. Kariyamal	13,210	10.41%	
CPI(M)	P. Shanmugam	6,136	4.83%	−14.65%
JP	M. Dasarathan	1,508	1.19%	
Independent	R. Selvaraj	1,112	0.88%	
Margin of victory		36,403	28.68%	−8.64%
Turnout		126,930	65.74%	0.18%
Registered electors		206,726		
DMK gain from INC		Swing	-2.97%	

=== 1991 ===
1991 Tamil Nadu Legislative Assembly election: Harur
Party	Candidate	Votes	%	±%
INC	P. Abaranji	66,636	58.56%	37.33%
PMK	P. V. Kariyamal	24,172	21.24%	
CPI(M)	M. Annamalai	22,175	19.49%	−12.19%
Margin of victory		42,464	37.32%	35.22%
Turnout		113,790	65.56%	8.60%
Registered electors		179,487		
INC gain from CPI(M)		Swing	26.88%	

=== 1989 ===
1989 Tamil Nadu Legislative Assembly election: Harur
Party	Candidate	Votes	%	±%
CPI(M)	M. Annamalai	28,324	31.68%	0.71%
AIADMK	A. Anbazhagan	26,447	29.58%	−37.38%
INC	M. Kuppammal	18,982	21.23%	
AIADMK	R. Rajamanickam	11,448	12.80%	−54.16%
Independent	M. Kamalesan	3,570	3.99%	
Independent	H. P. Vaigundam	461	0.52%	
Margin of victory		1,877	2.10%	−33.89%
Turnout		89,418	56.96%	−11.98%
Registered electors		160,709		
CPI(M) gain from AIADMK		Swing	-35.28%	

=== 1984 ===
1984 Tamil Nadu Legislative Assembly election: Harur
Party	Candidate	Votes	%	±%
AIADMK	R. Rajamanickam	60,106	66.96%	9.30%
CPI(M)	M. Annamalai	27,799	30.97%	
Independent	C. Markandan	1,383	1.54%	
Independent	A. Viseray	475	0.53%	
Margin of victory		32,307	35.99%	17.82%
Turnout		89,763	68.93%	12.38%
Registered electors		136,214		
AIADMK hold		Swing	9.30%	

=== 1980 ===
1980 Tamil Nadu Legislative Assembly election: Harur
Party	Candidate	Votes	%	±%
AIADMK	C. Sabapathy	40,009	57.66%	
INC	T. V. Natesan	27,401	39.49%	18.66%
Independent	K. S. Raman	1,715	2.47%	
Margin of victory		12,608	18.17%	5.06%
Turnout		69,383	56.55%	4.43%
Registered electors		124,169		
AIADMK gain from CPI(M)		Swing	22.97%	

=== 1977 ===
1977 Tamil Nadu Legislative Assembly election: Harur
Party	Candidate	Votes	%	±%
CPI(M)	M. Annamalai	20,042	34.69%	
JP	K. Surattaiyan	12,470	21.59%	
INC	K. S. Raman	12,032	20.83%	−18.85%
DMK	R. Sivaraj	11,096	19.21%	−35.05%
Independent	P. Meiyazhakan	1,622	2.81%	
Independent	K. Theethan	508	0.88%	
Margin of victory		7,572	13.11%	−1.48%
Turnout		57,770	52.12%	−18.94%
Registered electors		112,102		
CPI(M) gain from DMK		Swing	-19.57%	

=== 1971 ===
1971 Tamil Nadu Legislative Assembly election: Harur
Party	Candidate	Votes	%	±%
DMK	S. A. Chinnaraju	33,039	54.26%	7.13%
INC	M. Ponnusamy	24,159	39.68%	−8.41%
Independent	K. Ponnusamy	3,299	5.42%	
Independent	M. Raman	391	0.64%	
Margin of victory		8,880	14.58%	13.63%
Turnout		60,888	71.06%	−5.29%
Registered electors		88,615		
DMK gain from INC		Swing	6.17%	

=== 1967 ===
1967 Madras Legislative Assembly election: Harur
Party	Candidate	Votes	%	±%
INC	N. Theerthagiri	27,565	48.09%	13.63%
DMK	N. Arumugam	27,017	47.14%	5.80%
RPI	P. V. Kariyamal	2,488	4.34%	
Margin of victory		548	0.96%	−5.91%
Turnout		57,318	76.35%	14.29%
Registered electors		77,563		
INC gain from DMK		Swing	6.76%	

=== 1962 ===
1962 Madras Legislative Assembly election: Harur
Party	Candidate	Votes	%	±%
DMK	C. Manickam	26,879	41.33%	
INC	M. K. Mariappa	22,411	34.46%	11.34%
CPI	A. Munisamy	11,204	17.23%	
We Tamils	K. Nagarajan	2,385	3.67%	
Independent	C. Theerthagiri	1,259	1.94%	
Independent	M. Arumugam	893	1.37%	
Margin of victory		4,468	6.87%	6.43%
Turnout		65,031	62.07%	0.81%
Registered electors		110,626		
DMK gain from INC		Swing	18.21%	

=== 1957 ===
1957 Madras Legislative Assembly election: Harur
Party	Candidate	Votes	%	±%
INC	P. M. Munusami Gounder	26,172	23.13%	3.29%
Independent	T. Ponnusami	14,133	12.49%	
Independent	C. Theerthagiri (Sc)	13,689	12.10%	
CPI	Poosami (Sc)	10,682	9.44%	
Independent	Desai Venugopal Naidu	9,180	8.11%	
Independent	K. Sivaprakasam Mudali	5,661	5.00%	
Independent	P. Subramania Chetty	4,818	4.26%	
Independent	Podujanopagari T. V. Anganna Chettiar	3,161	2.79%	
Margin of victory		12,039	11.46%	
Turnout		113,172	61.26%	−11.97%
Registered electors		184,747		
INC gain from Independent		Swing	-5.01%	

=== 1952 ===
1952 Madras Legislative Assembly election: Harur
Party	Candidate	Votes	%	±%
Independent	A. Duraiswami Gounder	27,806	28.14%	
INC	Nanjappan	19,601	19.83%	19.83%
RPI	Mariappan	15,098	15.28%	
Independent	Theerthagiri	8,724	8.83%	
Independent	Thirupathi Chetty	5,729	5.80%	
Independent	Theerthan	3,946	3.99%	
Margin of victory		8,205	8.30%	
Turnout		98,825	73.23%	
Registered electors		134,950		
Independent win (new seat)				
