= N. Theerthagiri =

Indian politician

N. Theerthagiri is an Indian politician and former Member of the Legislative Assembly of Tamil Nadu. He was elected to the Tamil Nadu legislative assembly from Harur constituency as an Indian National Congress candidate in and 1967 election.
