= B. Pallipatti =

B.Pallipatti Bairanatham Pallipatti
- Village panchayat
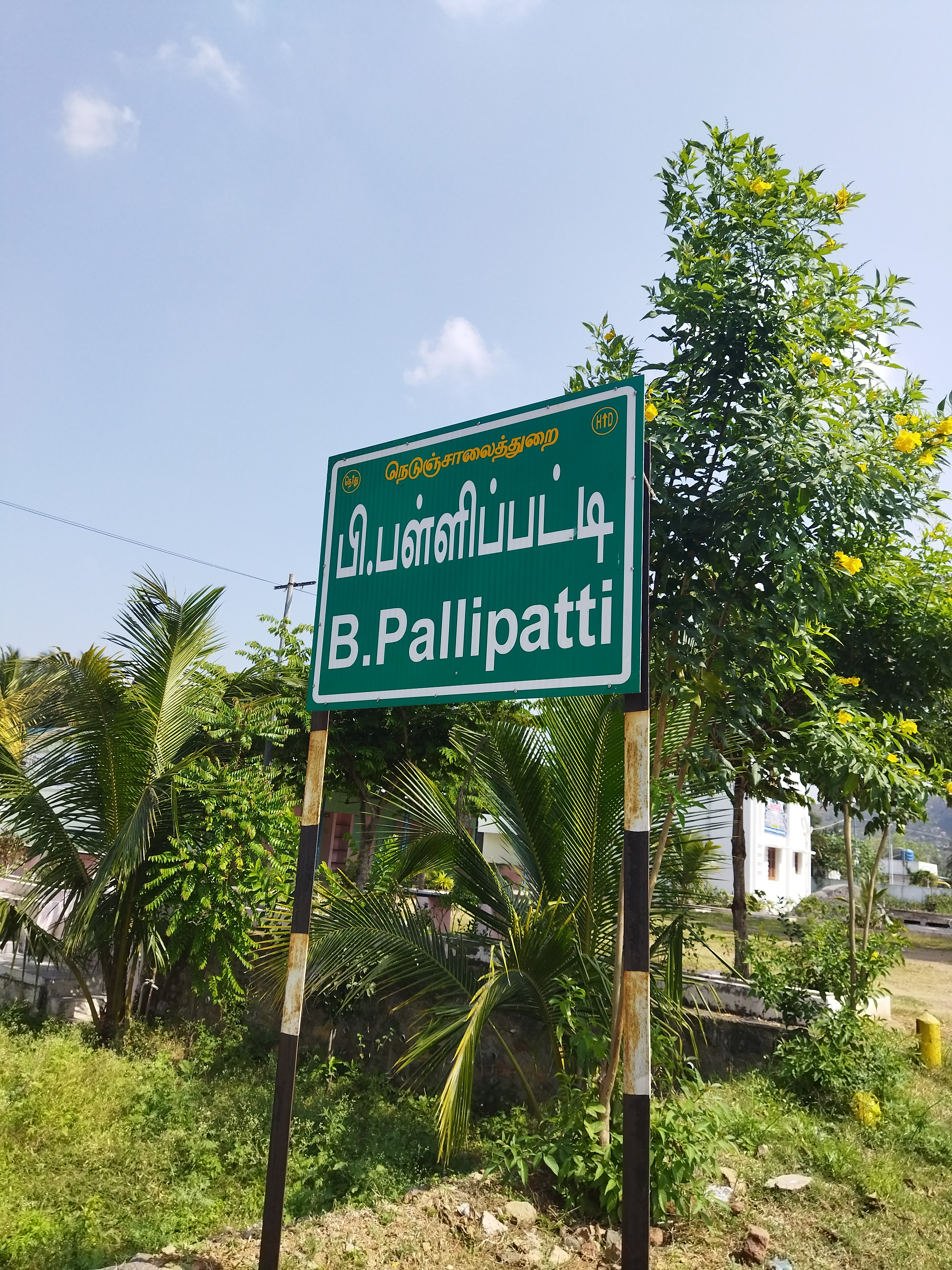
- A Road side sign board of this village
- Nickname: Pallipatti
- Location in Tamil Nadu, India
- Coordinates: 11.947°N 78.28°E
- Country: India
- State: Tamil Nadu
- Region: Kongu Nadu
- District: Dharmapuri
- Block: Pappireddipatti
- Panchayat: B Pallipatti

Government
  - Type: Panchayat

Population (2011)
  - Total: 3,684

Languages
  - Official: Tamil
- Time zone: UTC+5:30 (IST)
- PIN: 635301
- Telephone code: 91-4346
- Vehicle registration: TN 29
- Lok Sabha Constituency: Dharmapuri
- Assembly Constituency: Pappireddipatti

B. Pallipatti is a village in the Dharmapuri district of the Indian state of Tamil Nadu. The village code is 643526, and it is under the jurisdiction of B. Pallipatti Grama panchayath.

== Location ==
The town is located 38 km from the district capital Dharmapuri and 11 km from Pappireddipatti. It also has an average elevation of 340 meters above sea level. The nearest town is Bommidi.

== Population classification ==
In 2011, the town had 876 families and 3684 people. Of these, 1942 were males and 1742 were females. Here is a government-aided primary school with 420 students. Our Lady of Lourde Church is famous in this town.

== See also ==
- Pappireddipatti
- Bommidi
- Dharmapuri district
