= Laligam =

Coordinates: 12°03′N 78°09′E

Laligam is a village panchayat in the Dharmapuri district, Tamil Nadu, India.

As of 2011 Laligam had a population of 7,601 persons.
