= Pilchinnampalayam =

Village in Tamil Nadu, India

Coordinates: 10°35′2.87″N 77°0′47.92″E

Pilchinnampalayam is a village located in Pollachi Taluk, in the Coimbatore District of the Indian state of Tamil Nadu.

Village	Pilchinnampalayam
Taluk	Pollachi
District	Coimbatore
State	Tamil Nadu
Country	India
Continent	Asia
Time Zone	IST ( UTC + 05:30)
Currency	Indian Rupee ( INR )
Dialing Code	+91
Internet country code top-level domain (cTLD)	.in
Language	Tamil
Time difference	21 minutes
Latitude	10.582944
Longitude	77.0145652

== Geography ==
The village is located 55 km south of district headquarters Coimbatore, 9 km from Anamalai, and approximately 22 km from the state capital Chennai. Cities near Pilchinnampalayam include Pollachi, Udumalaipettai, and Chittur-Thathamangalam.

Nearby villages include Somandurai (3 km), Vakkampalayam (4 km), Dhalavaipalayam (5 km), Kambalapatti (5 km), and Palayur (6 km). Anamalai Taluk is to the west, Pollachi North Taluk is to the North, Kinathukadavu Taluk is to the North, Udumalpet Taluk is to the East. Pollachi, Valparai, Udumalaipettai, Chittur-Thathamangalam are the nearby Cities to Pilchinnampalayam.

== Demographics ==
Languages spoken include Tamil and English.

== Transport ==
=== Rail ===
Pollachi Jn Rail Way Station is the nearest railway station. Coimbatore Jn Railway Station is a larger station. Other stations include Udumalaippettai (29 km), Walayar (37 km) and Kollengode (39 km).

=== Air ===
Nearby airports are Peelamedu Airport (55 km), Kochi Airport (146 km), Calicut Airport (180 km) and Madurai Airport (185 km).
