= M. Annamalai (CPI-M politician) =

Indian politician

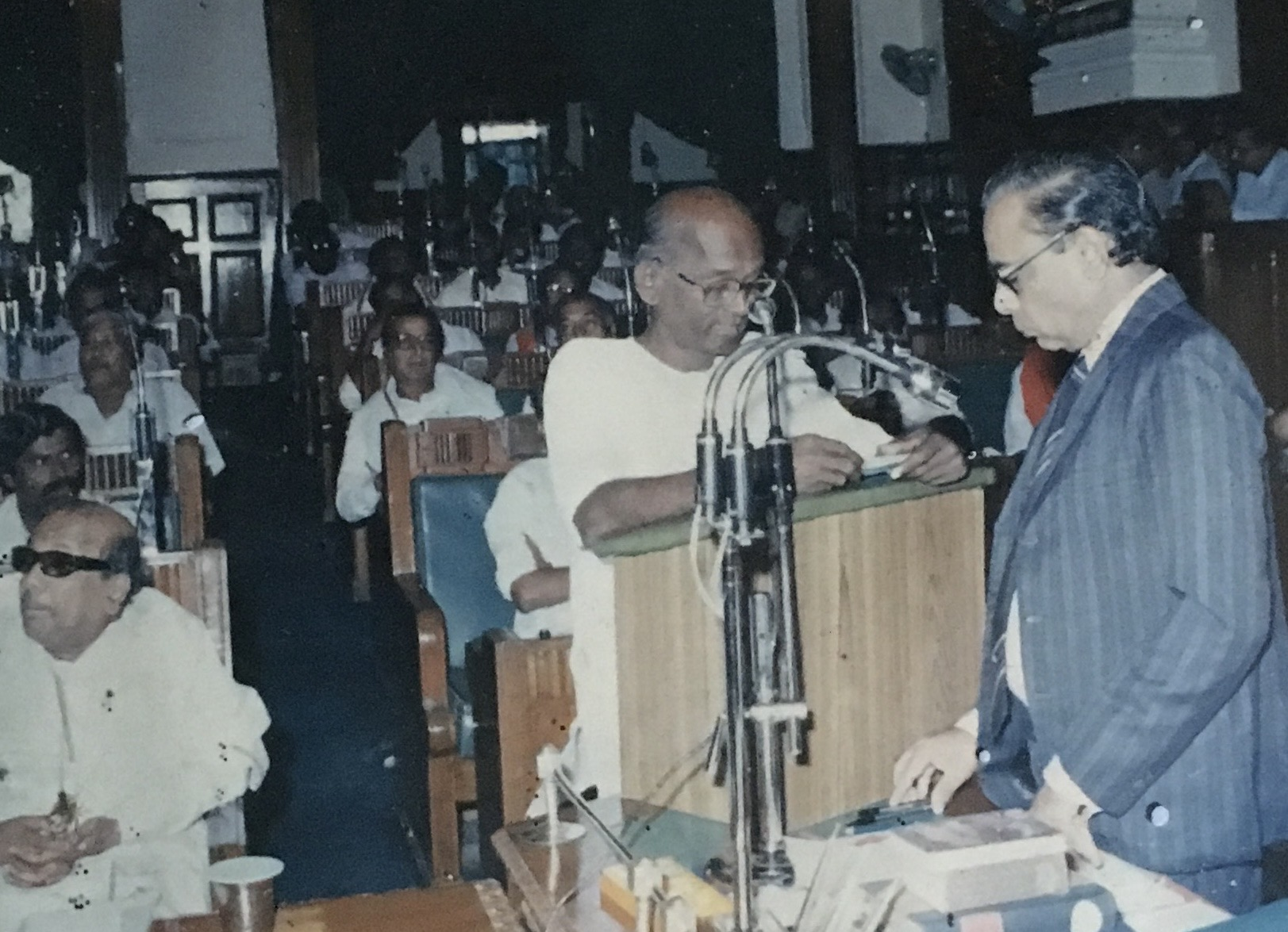
M Annamalai Ex M.L.A Harur

M. Annamalai is an Indian politician and former Member of the Legislative Assembly of Tamil Nadu. He was elected to the Tamil Nadu legislative assembly from Harur constituency as a Communist Party of India (Marxist) candidate in 1977, and 1989 elections.
