= Tangrakottai =

Castle ruin in India

Tenkaraikottai
- Part of Tamil Nadu
- Dharmapuri District, Tamil Nadu, India
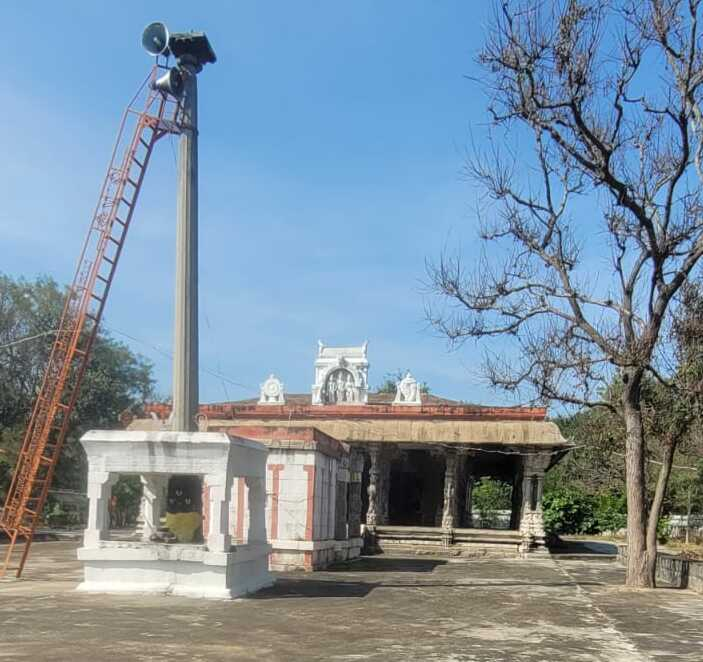
- Ramaswamy temple

Site information
- Type: Forts
- Controlled by: Government of Tamil Nadu
- Open to the public: yes
- Condition: Ruins

Location
- Coordinates: 12.07°N 78.16°E

Thenkaraikottai is a ruined castle was built by Seelappa Nayakkar and Chennappa Nayakkar of Vijayanagar dynasty. This castle is the only one built on land and not on a hill like others and is situated near Pappireddipatti, Dharmapuri district, Tamil Nadu, India. The Major attraction of the place is the Sri Kalyana Ramaswamy temple which is dedicated to lord Rama (avatar of vishnu) with beautiful architecture is present in centre of the fort. There are few ruined historic buildings which includes Granaries, stables for elephants and horses, cannons, a bathing area for the princes and many more. The fort is about 40 acres.

== Kalyana Ramaswamy temple ==
Kalyana Ramaswamy temple is the temple present in Thenkaraikottai.This temple was said to be built by Seelappa Nayakkar and Chennappa Nayakkar of Vijayaagar dynasty during 15th century and filled with wonderful architecture and is administered and maintained by the Hindu Religious and Charitable Endowments Department of the Government of Tamil Nadu. The temple is primarily said to be built by pandyas where Lord Rama showerd his divine blessings to the king in Pattabisheka Srikolam in his dreams and said him to build a temple for him in this place.

There were many ruins in the temple and were said to take care by the government and then had been taken measures later at 2019 and had been reported by many media channels.

== History ==
The Thenkarai fort and Perumal temple was built by Seelappa Nayakkar and Chennapa Nayakkar of Vijayanagara Kingdom. In the year 1652 the fort was captured the by the Mohammed Adil Shah, Sultan of Bijapur, The temple's Architecture is similar to Vellore Jalakandeswarar Temple, Vellore.

== Significance ==
This temple has beautiful sculptures and pillars produce the seven Svaras of the Indian classical music which is only present some temples like the Vitthala temple in Hampi and in Nellaiappar Temple in Tirunelveli. This temple is the oldest in the area and has one shiva temple in the fort complex. This temple's Moola garbagriha has twelve moolavars in the form of Pattabishekam Srikolam. Devotees believe that Lord Rama will deny all the obstacles of a person upcoming in his life and also make his devotees find their life partner soon. Lord Rama is in a seated posture which is very rare to see.
