= M. Annamalai (scientist) =

Indian scientist

- Born: 1945 (age 80–81); Coimbatore, Tamil Nadu, India
- Education: IISC
- Occupation: Space scientist
- Employers: ISRO; Satish Dhawan Space Centre
- Awards: Padma Shri (2011)

M. Annamalai, from the South Indian state of Karnataka, is a space scientist. He is a former director of the Satish Dhawan Space Centre, in Sriharikota and holds the position of the Senior Advisor (Space Transportations Systems) at ISRO.

Annamalai is a post graduate in Space Engineering from the Indian Institute of Science, Bengaluru and joined ISRO in 1970. He is credited with contributions in many areas of vehicle launch such as infrastructure development, design, integration and testing. He has also designed the 1.2 M Infrared astronomy telescope of Physical Research Laboratory at Mount Abu and many Antenna mounts for the ISRO network for tracking satellites and launch vehicles. The Government of India honored Annamalai in 2011, with the fourth highest civilian award of Padma Shri.

== See also ==
- Satish Dhawan Space Centre
- Indian Space Research Organization
