= Pappireddipatti =

- Town panchayat
- Location in Tamil Nadu, India Pappireddipatti (India)
- Coordinates: 11.911933°N 78.366004°E
- Country: India
- State: Tamil Nadu
- District: Dharmapuri

Government
  - Type: Town Panchayat
  - Body: Pappireddipatti Town Panchayat

Population (2011)
  - Total: 19,369

Languages
  - Official: Tamil
- Time zone: UTC+5:30 (IST)
- PIN: 636905
- Telephone code: +91-4346
- Vehicle registration: TN-29
- Climate: Warm and Dry (Köppen)
- Avg. summer temperature: 38 °C (100 °F)
- Avg. winter temperature: 17 °C (63 °F)
- Website: https://www.townpanchayat.in/pappireddipatti

Pappireddipatti is a Town Panchayat of Dharmapuri district in the Indian state of Tamil Nadu and also a revenue Taluk of Dharmapuri district.

Pappireddipatti is the business center for villages surrounding it and for the people living in villages of Shevaroy Hills.

== Geography ==
It is almost surrounded by hills in all directions; mainly Kalrayan Hills in the East and Shevaroy Hills in the west.

Vaniyar Dam, one of the big dams in Dharmapuri district is located at 5 km from Pappireddipatti, built in the foothills of Shevaroy Hills across the Vaniyar river a major tributary of Ponnaiyar River. The Dam has a capacity to hold 418 mcft water with a depth of 65 ft and connected to the lakes of Venkatasamuthram, Aalapuram, Onthiampatti, Thenkaraikottai and Parayapatti via channels. There is small park and officer's quarters available near the dam. The dam is scenic and people can reach Yercaud by a long walk through the Shrevarayan forest.

The dam receives water from its catchment area in Shevaroy Hills. Water will be flowing to the dam only during Monsoon season and remains dry if monsoon fails. During 29 November 2010, water level of the dam reached 64.29 ft against its full depth of 65 feet.

=== Climate ===
Pappireddipatti has a Warm and Dry climate (Köppen), with monsoonal influences typical of India. The town's yearly rainfall average stands at 857 millimetres (33.7 in). A maximum rainfall of 1,640.9 millimetres (64.60 in) was recorded in the rainfall station situated at Chitteri during 1991. Pappireddipatti area is drained by Vaniyar river system by its tributaries like Kallar, Veppadi aaru and Krukkampatti aaru.

=== Geology ===
Pappireddipatti area is covered by hard Crystalline rock. Ground water level ranges from 4.41 metres (14.5 ft) to 19.07 metres (62.6 ft) during winter and 2.94 metres (9.6 ft) to 9.47 metres (31.1 ft) during summer. Hydrological soil group 'D' with slow rate of infiltration covers more than half of this area.

Quartz is available at Peddampatti Village of Pappireddipatti.

== Demographics ==
As of 2011 census of India, Pappireddipatti had a population of 19,369. Males and females constitute roughly 50:50 of the population. Pappireddipatti has a literacy rate of 73%, on par with the national average but lesser than the state literacy rate of 80.1%. Male literacy is 79%, and female literacy is 67%. In Pappireddipatti, 8% of the population is under 6 years of age.

== Festival ==
While Kaanum Pongal, the fourth day of Pongal festival, people visit Vaniyar Dam to spend their time with family, relatives and friends.

== Transport ==
Pappireddipatti is well connected by roads to the nearby city Salem and district headquarters Dharmapuri. The nearest railway station is at Bommidi, 16.4 km from Pappireddipatti. The nearest airport is at Salem, 42 km.

== Picture Gallery ==
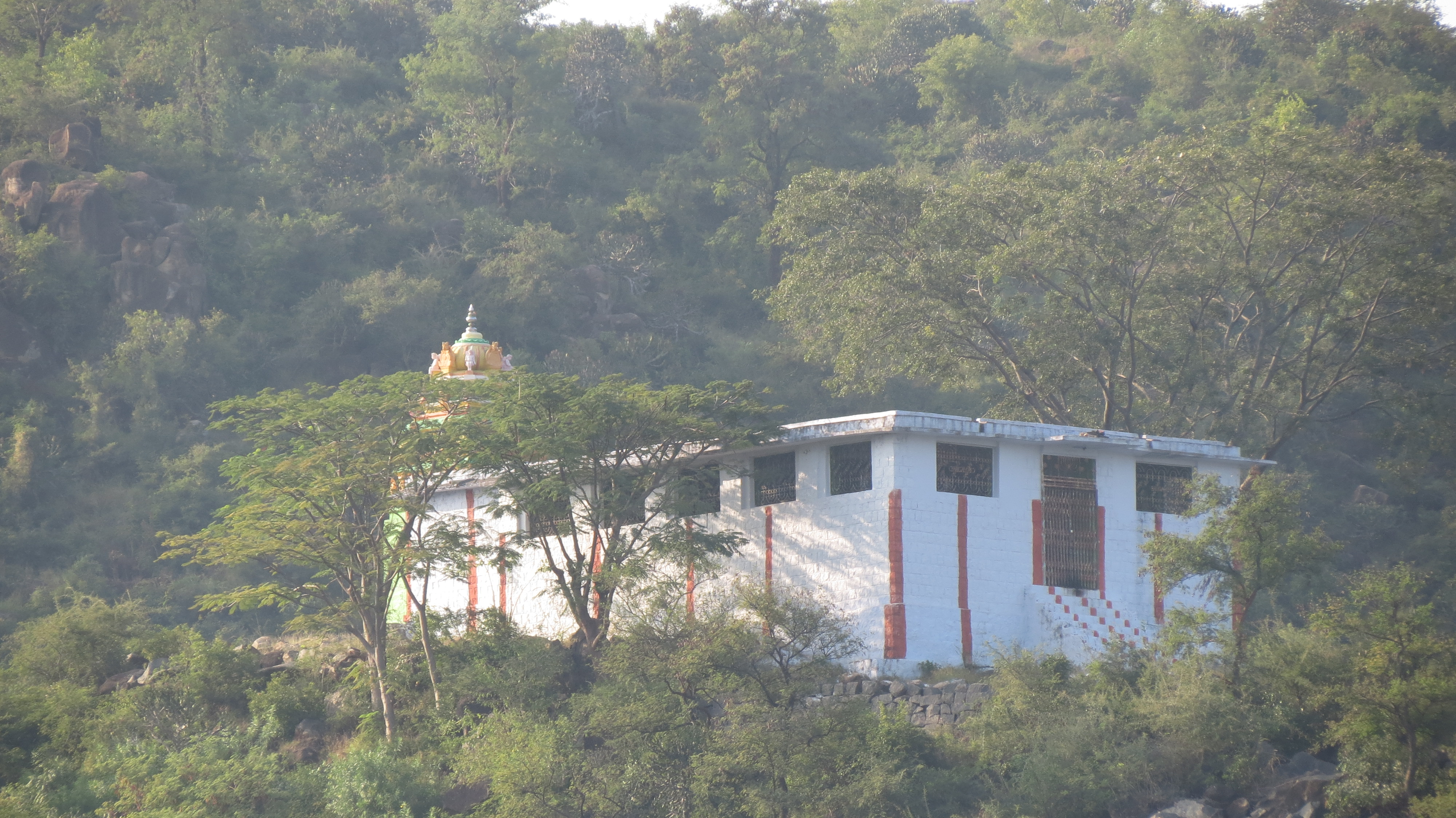
Murugan Hill Temple

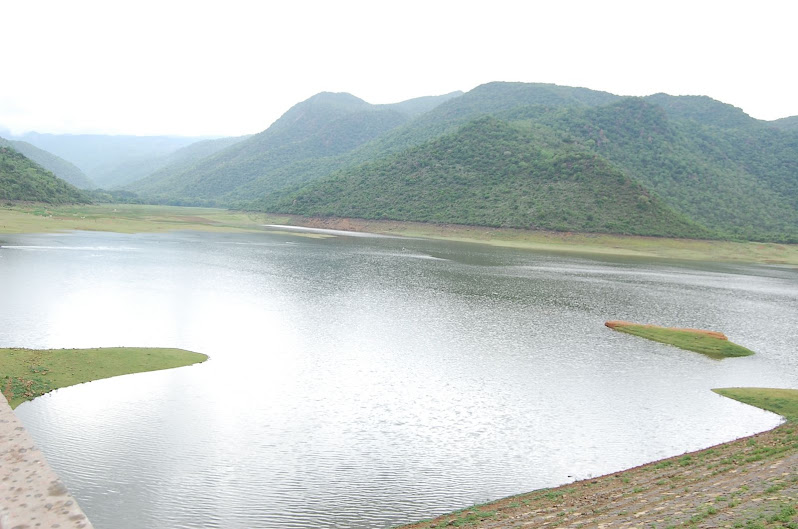
Vaniyar Dam

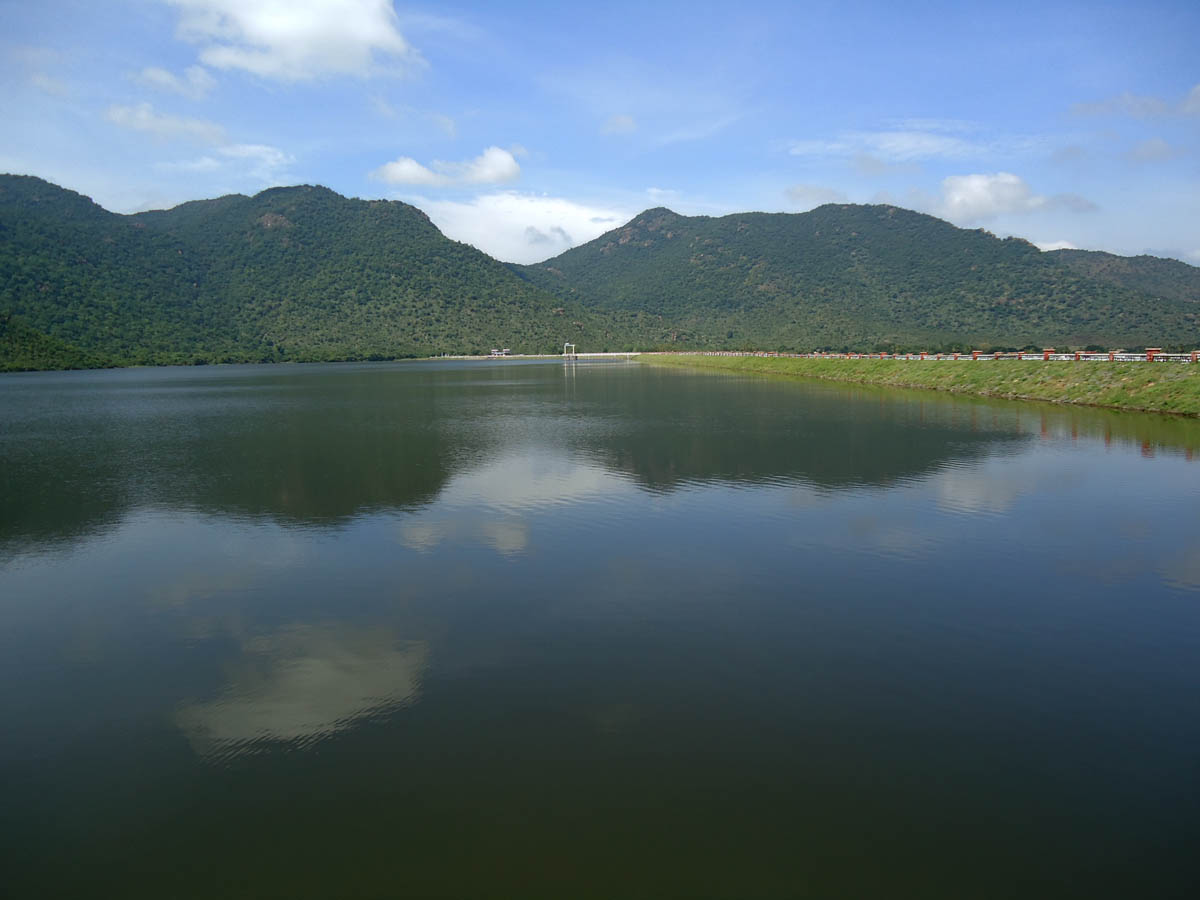
Vaniyar Dam

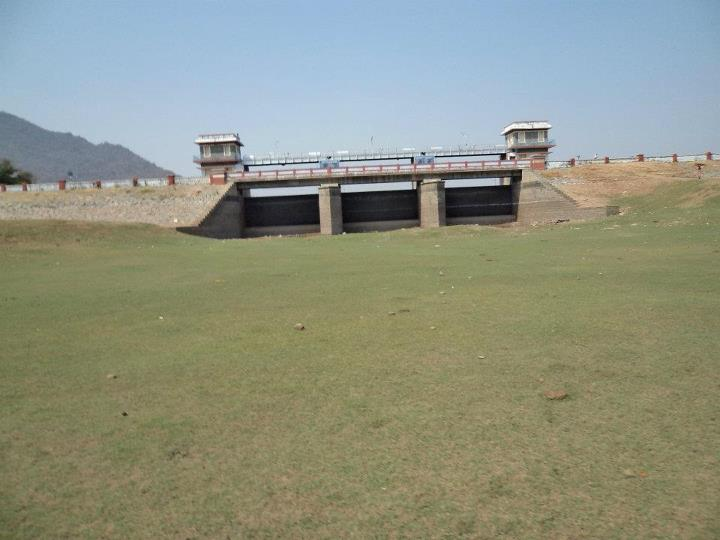
Vaniyar Dam

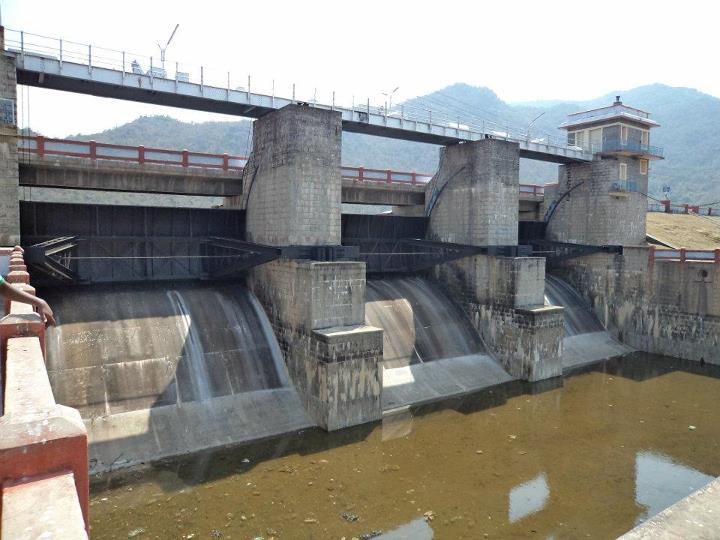
Vaniyar Dam

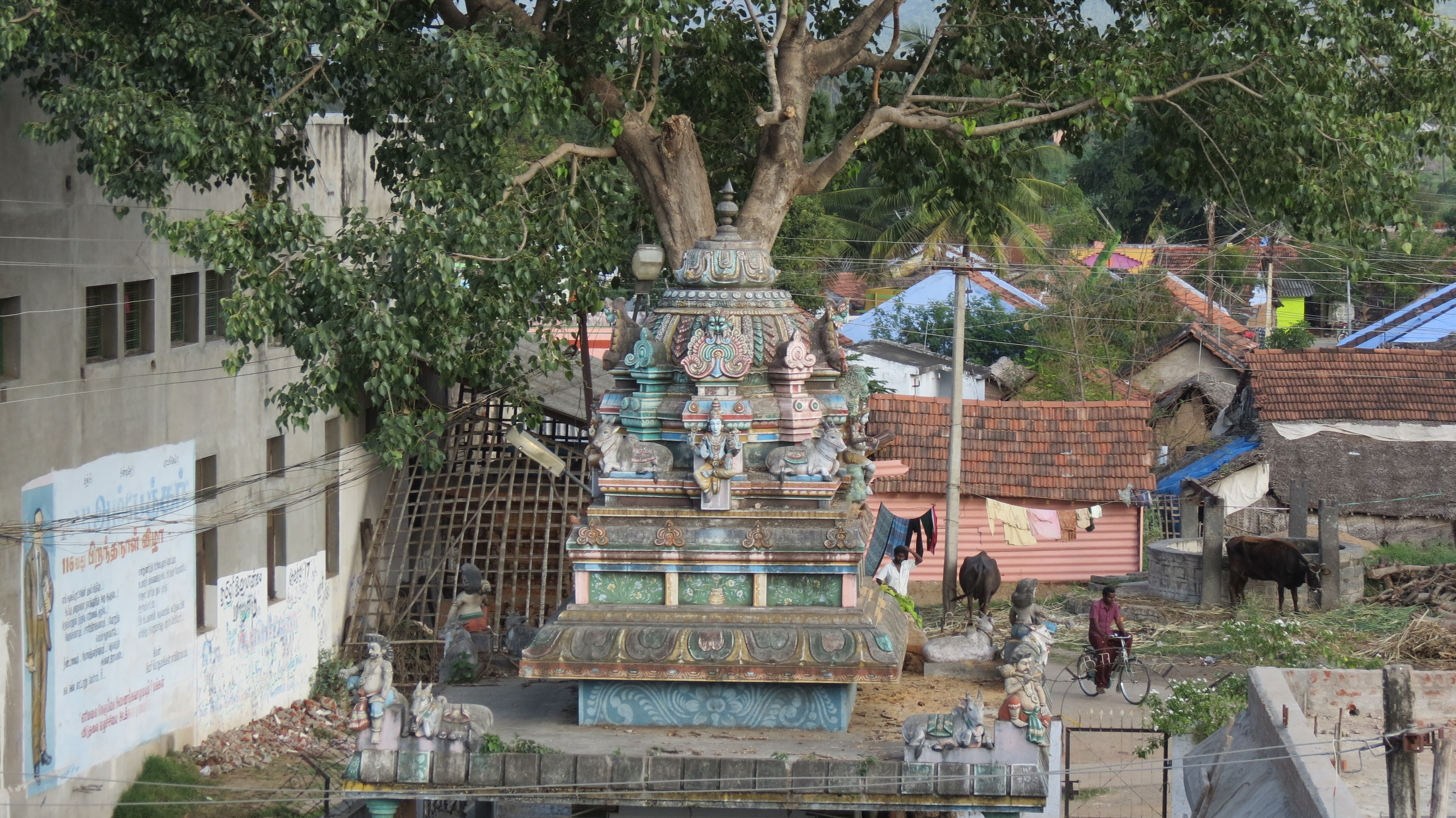
Lord Vinayagar Temple

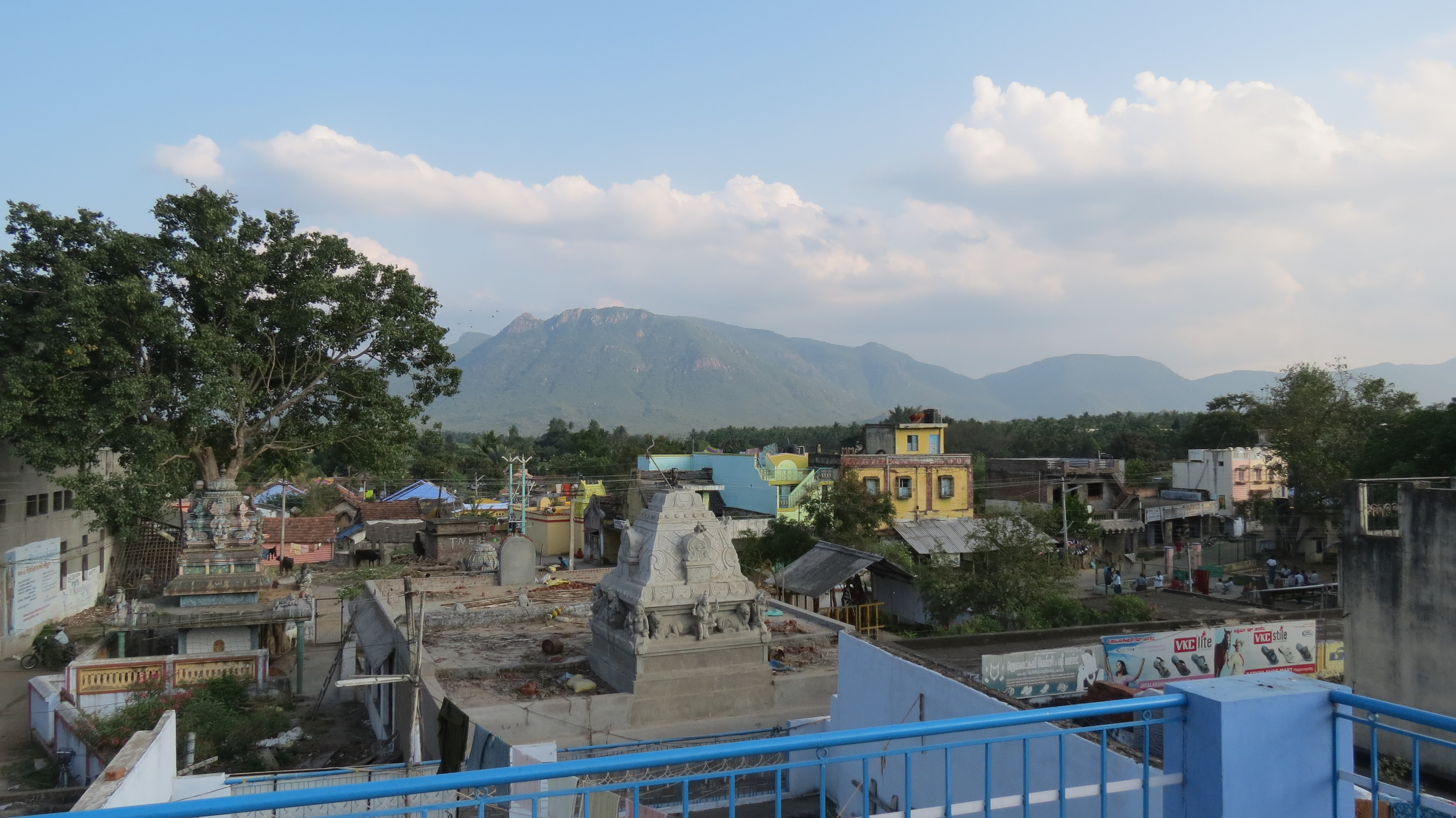
Aerial View

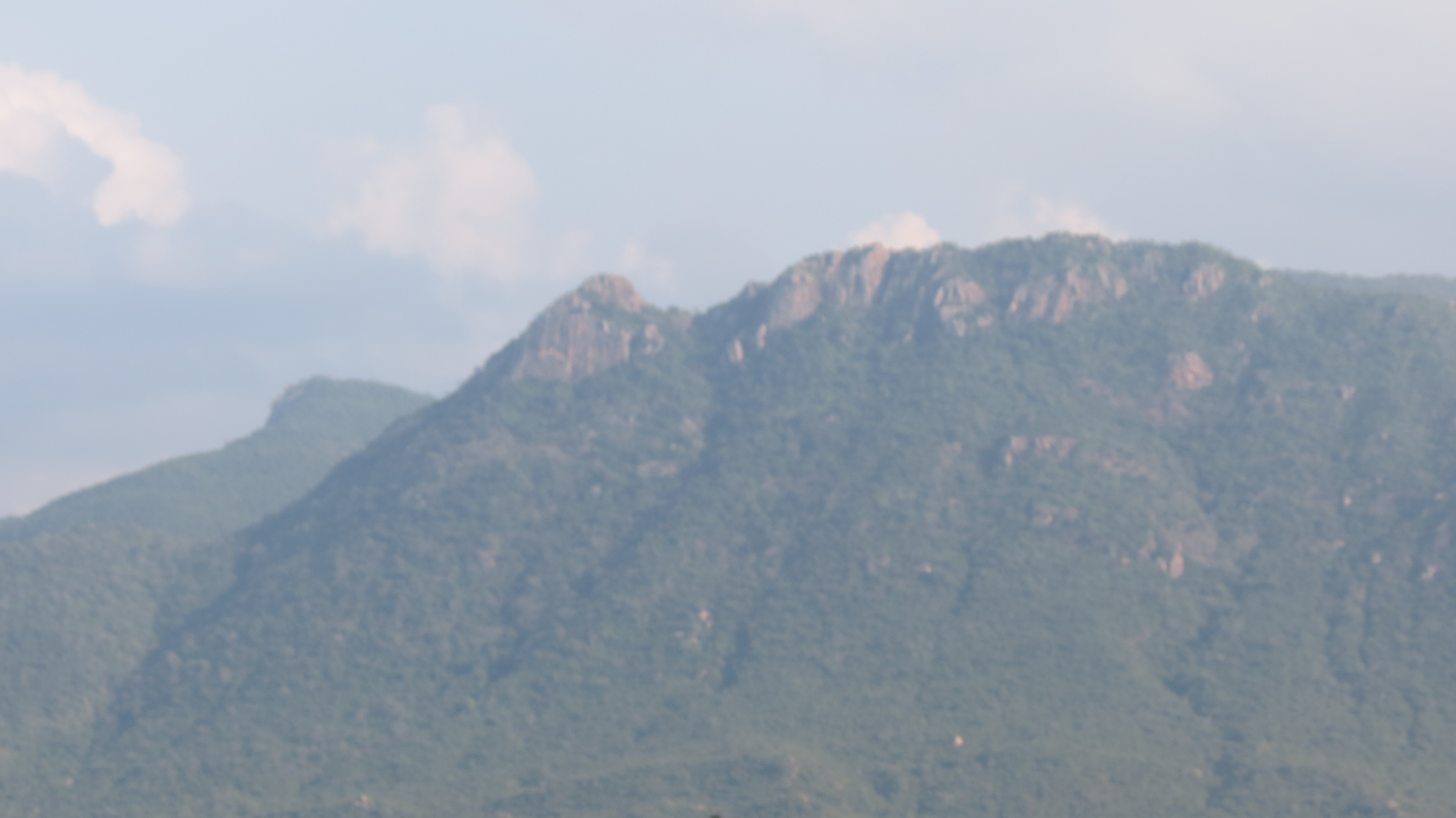
Mountains - East

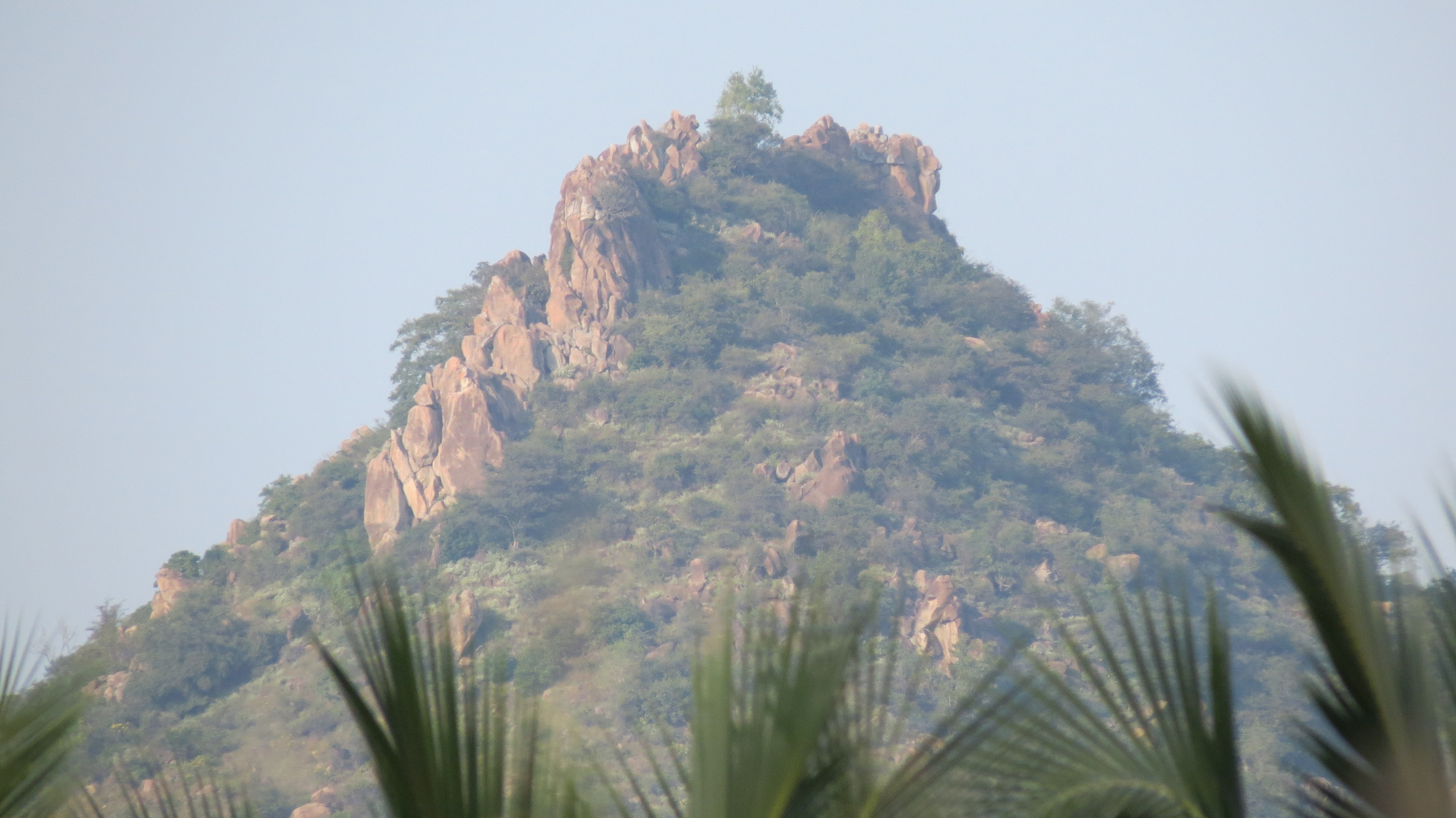
A Hill in North

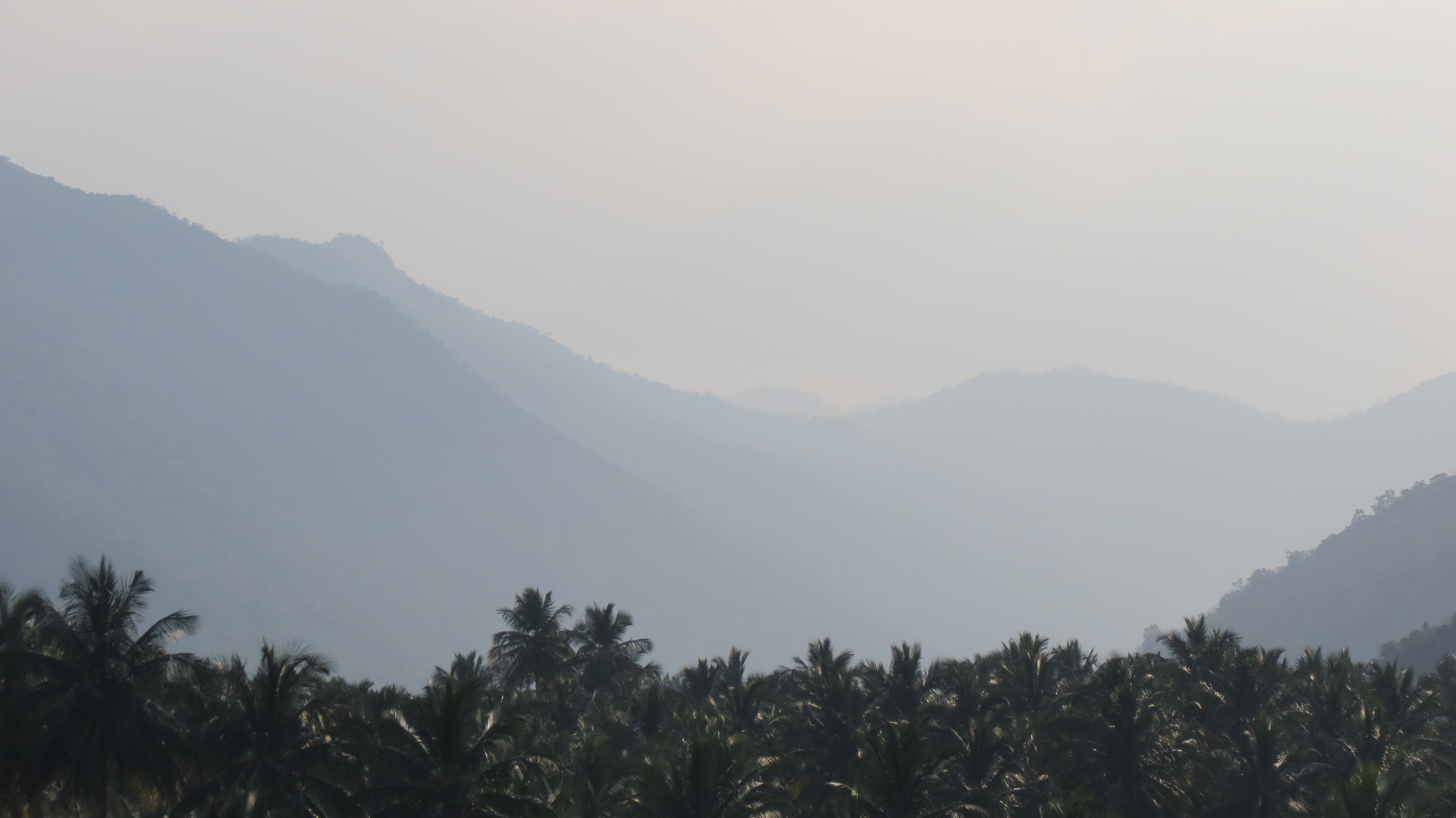
Ghat View - South

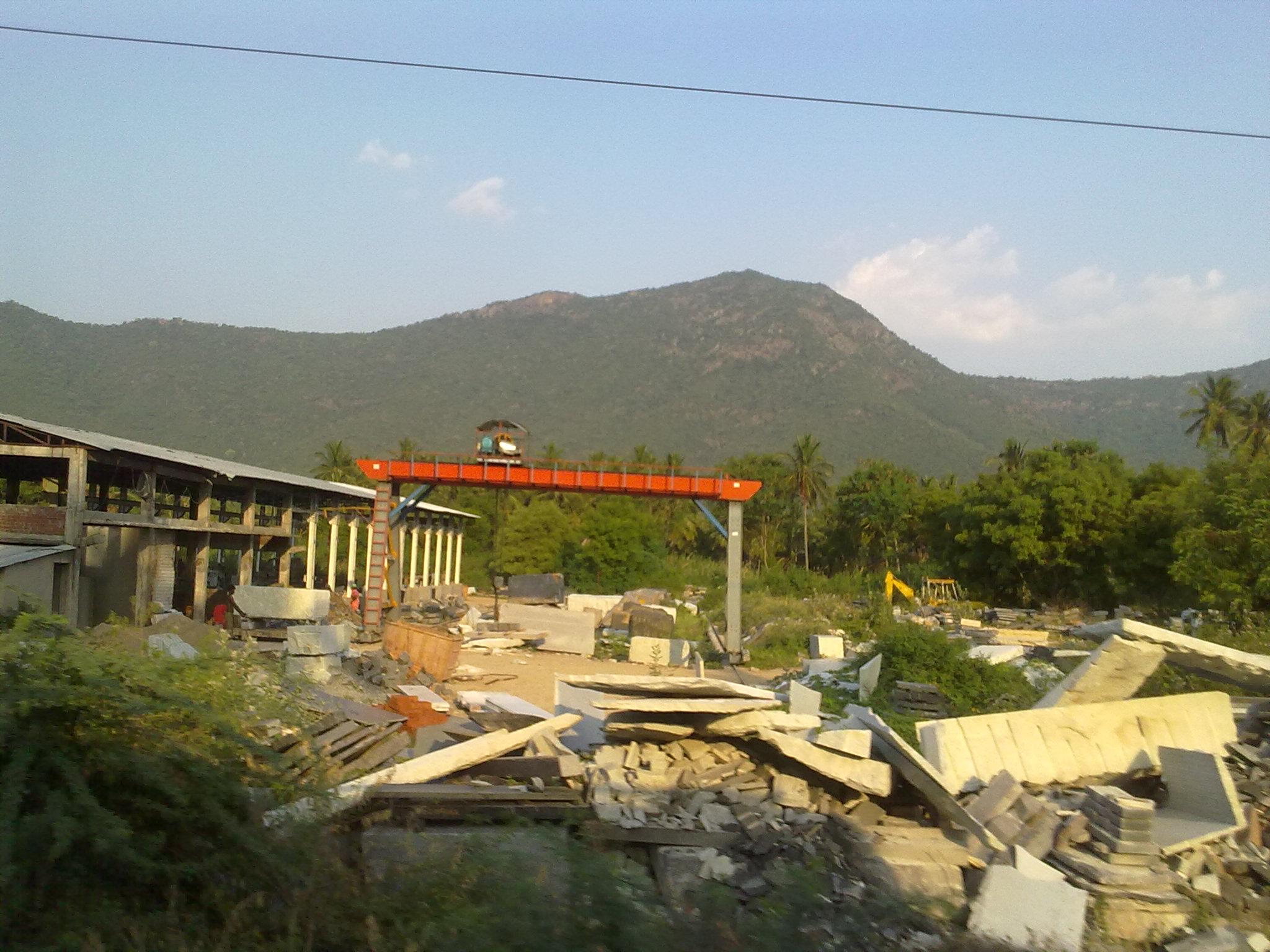
Granite Factory, Salem Road

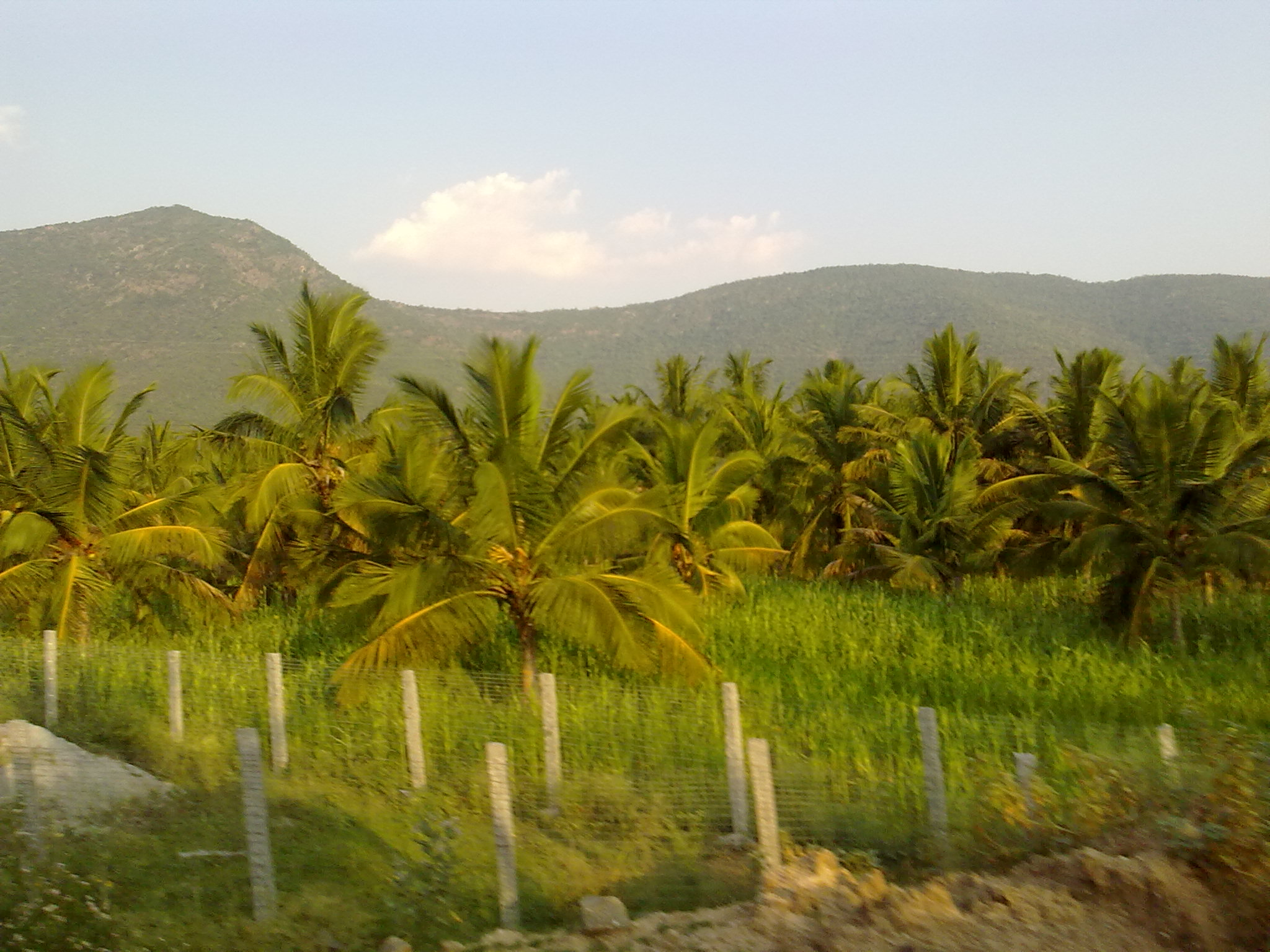
Farm Land
