= Bommidi =

Bommidi B. Mallapuram
- Town panchayat
- Bommidi, Tamil Nadu
- Coordinates: 11°58′44.8″N 78°15′04.7″E
- Country: India
- State: Tamil Nadu
- Region: Kongu Nadu
- District: Dharmapuri
- Elevation: 453 m (1,486 ft)

Population
  - Total: 11,474 (2,001)

Languages
  - Official: Tamil
- Time zone: UTC+5:30 (IST)
- PIN: 635301
- Telephone code: 91-4346
- Vehicle registration: TN 29
- Coastline: 320 kilometres (200 mi)
- Nearest city: Salem
- Sex ratio: 1.062 ♂/♀
- Lok Sabha constituency: Dharmapuri
- Climate: Tropical (Köppen)
- Avg. summer temperature: 35 °C (95 °F)
- Avg. winter temperature: 26 °C (79 °F)
- Website: https://www.townpanchayat.in/b-mallapuram

Bommidi is a panchayat town which is located in Pappireddipatti taluka of Dharmapuri district in Tamil Nadu, India. It is also known as B. Mallapuram. Bommidi's name is used for the railway station, the police station situated at Nadur, the post office, and bus transportation, while the name "B. Mallapuram" is used for schools, hospitals, and government officials.

== Geography ==
Bommidi is situated 34 kilometres (21 mi) southeast of Dharmapuri. It is in the southern region of the district. Bommidi is close to the Salem district border. It is surrounded by Yercaud Hills, Kavaramalai RF and Mookanur Hills.

== Transport ==
Bommidi has rail and bus connectivity with Chennai, Salem, Coimbatore, Mangalore, Allepy, Dhanbad, etc.

== Road ==
Bommidi is situated 58 kilometres (36 mi) from the Salem bus stand, en route to Chennai via Jolarpet Junction. A number of buses run from Dharmapuri to Salem via Bommidi. Tamil Nadu State Transport Corporation (TNSTC) operates daily straight buses to Chennai, Bangalore, Trichy, Coimbatore, Palani, Madurai and very frequent bus services to Salem, Dharmapuri, Omalur, and Harur.

== Trains ==
It is connected by rail. Bommidi can be reached from Salem and Dharmapuri. Bommidi Railway Station is on the Coimbatore-Chennai railway line.

There is also an 11 km railway line proposal for linking Bommidi railway station lying in Salem - Jolarpettai line to Muttampatti railway station lying in Salem - Dharmapuri line. The railway station in Bommidi was built in 1861 and is one of the oldest railway stations in Tamil Nadu. Trains from Kerala to New Delhi, Chennai, and Tirupati pass through Bommidi. Bommidi has direct trains to Tirupathi, Chennai, Bangalore, Mangalore, Mumbai, Kanyakumari, and Coimbatore.

== Airport ==
Nearest airport: Salem Airport, is 39 km from Bommidi, Coimbatore Airport to Bommidi 210 km, Bangalore Airport to Bommidi 190 km. The nearest city is Salem.

== Tourism ==
Attractions in the town include:

Aanai Maduvu Water Falls is located 9 km (5.5 miles) from Bommidi.

Vathalmalai Hills station, It is situated at an altitude of 1,418 m (4,652 ft) height above sea level. It is located 15 km (9.3 miles) from bommidi. It covers an area measuring nearly 225 km2 (87 sq miles).

Yercaud Hills Station, is located 39 km (24.3 miles) from Bommidi in the Shevaroys range of hills in the Eastern Ghats. The total extent of Yercaud Taluk is 383 square kilometers, including reserve forest. It is situated at an altitude of 1,515 metres (4,970 ft) above sea level, and the highest point in Yercaud is the Servarayan temple, at 1,623 metres (5,326 ft).

Karadiyoor View Point is situated near Karadiyur village, which is so named due to the large number of sloth bears formerly found in this region. This popular lookout affords views of the valleys in Yercaud region to both the east and west.

Water Features near Boomidi include KN Puthur Lake (5.5 km), Alapuram Lake (15 km), and Vaniyaru Dam (15 km).
