= Mathur, Krishnagiri =

Mathur
- Town
- Location in Tamil Nadu, India
- Coordinates: 12.38357°N 78.41265°E
- Country: India
- State: Tamil Nadu
- Region: Thondainadu Region
- District: Krishnagiri
- Elevation: 372 m (1,220 ft)

Languages
  - Official: Tamil
- Time zone: UTC+5:30 (IST)
- PIN: 635203

Mathur is a town in the Pochampalli taluk in Krishnagiri District in Tamil Nadu, India.It is located on National Highway NH 77.It is Krishnagiri – Pondicherry Highway.It is located 30 km from Krishnagiri, 24 km from Tirupathur, and 20 km from Uthangarai. Mathur is surrounded by Kandhili Taluk towards North, Uthangarai Taluk towards South, Bargur Taluk towards North, Tirupattur taluk towards East. Mathur is one of the 10 revenue blocks in Krishnagiri District and consists of 24 panchaya.

Mathur has a Someshwar temple and a Vishnu temple. The Someshwar temple is believed to be at least 450 years old and is famous for the pradosham poojas and circumambulations around the temples on full moon days.

== Demographics ==
Tamil, Telugu and Kannada are the languages spoken in Mathur and Tamil is the local language in Mathur.

== Panchayat Villages in Mathur ==
Panchayat Villages in Mathur
Anandur
Antheripatti
Bommapalli
Ettipatti
Gerigepalli
Goundanur
Kannandahalli
Kattupatti
Kelarpathi
Kodamandapatti
Kunnathur
Mathur
Nagampatti
Naralapatti
Oddapatti
Papparapatti
Ramakrishnapathi
Salamarathupattii
Samalpatti
Sivampatti
Soolakarai
Valipatti
Vanipatti
Veerachikuppam

== Location ==
=== Bus Route ===
National Highway 77 from Krishnagiri to Pondicherry passes through Mathur. Mathur is located approximately 27 km from Krishnagiri in the National Highway 77 route towards Tiruvannamalai. Mathur is at 22 km distance from Tirupattur.

Frequent buses are available from the neighbouring towns Krishnagiri, Tirupattur & Uthangarai to Mathur. All the buses going to Tiruvannamalai or Pondicherry from Bangalore or Hosur or Krishnagiri go via Mathur.

=== Rail Route ===
The Nearest Railway Station is at Samalpatti (12 km from Mathur), in NH-77 highway going to Pondicherry.

=== Air Route ===
Nearest airports are Salem Airport and Bangalore International Airport.kuppam international airport (coming soon)

== Temples Near Mathur ==
Poongavanathamman Temple

Poongavanathamman Temple is in Sivampatti and is situated in the route to Tirupattur at a distance of 2 km from Mathur. Lord Shiva and Angala Parameswari are the main deities in this temple. Ant hills can be seen on either side in the artha mandapam. New moon day [Amavasai] worship to Poongavanathamman deity in this temple is very popular.

Sanjeevirayan Temple

Sanjeevirayan Temple is an ancient temple of Lord Hanuman, in Kunnathur and is situated in the route from Samalpatti to Tirupattur at a distance of 5 km from Samalpatti. Kunnathur is located approximately 17 km from Mathur. Lord Rama is seen in pattabisekha kolam along with his consort Goddess Sita Devi, Lakshmana and Hanuman, as urchavars in this temple.
