= Batrahalli =

- village
- Location in Tamil Nadu, India Batrahalli (India)
- Coordinates: 12°22′0″N 78°25′0″E
- Country: India
- State: Tamil Nadu
- District: Krishnagiri
- Elevation: 394 m (1,293 ft)

Languages
  - Official: Tamil
- Time zone: UTC+5:30 (IST)

Batrahalli is a town in Krishnagiri district, Tamil Nadu, India.

== Geography ==
It is located at an elevation of 394 m from MSL.

== Location ==
National Highway 66 passes through Batrahalli. Nearest airports are Salem Airport and Bangalore International Airport; nearest railway stations are at Dasampatti and Samalpatti.

== Places of interest ==
- Krishnagiri Dam
- Hanumanthathirtham
