= Baliganur =

- village
- Location in Tamil Nadu, India Baliganur (India)
- Coordinates: 12.51205°N 78.0265°E
- Country: India
- State: Tamil Nadu
- District: Krishnagiri

Languages
  - Official: Tamil
- Time zone: UTC+5:30 (IST)

Baliganur is a village in the Krishnagiri taluk of Krishnagiri District, Tamil Nadu, India. Baliganur is 20 km far from the district headquarters Krishnagiri . It is 231 km far from the state capital Chennai.

Baliganur is a name derived from balika which means young girl. The village is referred to as Gangakulam (Tamil: கங்காகுலம்).

In the modern age people can recognise as the Black Hill Village (Karimalai), after a hill located right in front of the village. It is surrounded by minor forest on one quarter.

== Agriculture in Baliganur ==
The important crops of Baliganur Village are rice, ragi, banana, tomato, coconut, mango, groundnut, vegetables and flowers. The village has an excellent scope for agri business.

== Population ==
Year	Male	Female	Total
2009	480	322	802
2011	492	445	937

== Jallikattu Festival ==
The bull-baiting sport known as Jallikattu is practiced in Baliganur during the annual Thai Pongal festival, using highly trained bulls and malai madus.

== Geography ==
The nearest towns are:

- Rayakottai (7.1 km)
- Veppanapalli (20.6 km)
- Shoolagiri (25.5 km) and
- Hosur (40.5 km)

The nearest villages are Bellampalli, Ennekol Pudur, Chikkapoovathi, Alappatti, and Madepatti.

== Education ==
=== Nearby schools ===
- Nalanda Matriculation Higher Secondary School
- R C Fathima Boys High School
- SVC Matriculation School
- Municipal Higher Secondary School
- Government Boys Higher Secondary School

=== Nearby colleges ===
- Government Arts College
- Government Arts and Science College for Women
- A.E.S. Teacher Training Education Institute
- Arignar Anna College

== Nearby banks ==
- Tamilnad Mercantile Bank, Ltd., Krishnagiri
- Union Bank of India, Krishnagiri
- Indian Bank, Royakottah
- State Bank of India, Krishnagiri town
