= Pochampalli, Tamil Nadu =

- Town
- Nickname: Pochampalli
- Location in Tamil Nadu, India
- Coordinates: 12.33235°N 78.36486°E
- Country: India
- State: Tamil Nadu
- District: Krishnagiri
- Taluk: Pochampalli

Languages
  - Official: Tamil
- Time zone: UTC+5:30 (IST)
- PIN: 635 206
- Telephone code: (91)4341
- Vehicle registration: TN-24

Pochampalli is a Panchayat town and Taluk in the Krishnagiri District of Tamil Nadu State, India. It also acts as the headquarters of Pochampalli taluk. Pochampalli is located 27 kilometers south from the district headquarters Krishnagiri, 30 kilometers from Dharmapuri, 30 kilometers from Tirupattur, and 256 kilometers from the state capital Chennai. It is located on SH-60.

Pochampalli is surrounded by Kaveripattinam, Krishnagiri Block to the West, Bargur Block to the North, and Kandhili and Uthangarai Block to the East.

The nearest towns are Tirupattur, Dharmapuri, and Krishnagiri. The nearby railway stations are Kallavi and Samalpatti, while the major junction is at Jolarpettai. The nearest domestic airport is in Salem, while the nearest international airport is in Bengaluru.

Pochampalli is known for housing one of the largest weekly markets in Tamil Nadu, on Sundays.

The town is located near one of the fastest-growing SIPCOTs in Tamil Nadu, where Fairway Enterprises Company Limited and OLA Electric Scooters have manufacturing plants and also a Government School, for boys and Girls.

== Geography ==
Pochampalli is located in the southeast of Krishnagiri district. It is bordered to the north by Bargur town and Tirupathur district, to the east and southeast by Uthangarai taluk, to the south and southwest by Dharmapuri district, and to the northwest by Krishnagiri taluk. Part of its border with the Harur taluk of Dharmpuri district is formed by the Ponnaiyar River.

== Demographics ==
In 2011, when the taluk was only one of five taluks in the district, and included parts of what is today Bargur taluk, it had a population of 182,119 people. There were 967 women for every 1,000 men. The taluk had a literacy rate of 65.3%. 10,018 males and 8,759 females, about 10.3% of the population, were at or below the age of 6.
