= Jagadevidurgam =

Coordinates: 12°29′06″N 78°19′09″E

Jagadevi, also known as Jagadevi Durgam, is a village located in the Bargur Taluk of Krishnagiri district, in Tamil Nadu, India. This village is situated 13 kilometers east of Krishnagiri and 9 kilometers from Bargur.

== Fort ==
Jagadevidurgam is a fort located on the hill near this village. It is a twin hill fort (double hill fort). The height of this hill is 2,647 feet. At the summit, there are fort fortifications, various buildings in ruins, granaries, and natural springs (sunai).

This fort played a significant role in the wars between the British and rulers Hyder Ali and Tipu Sultan. It served as the capital of the Jagadevi Rayars. Additionally, it is one of the twelve forts collectively known as the Baramahal, located in the Krishnagiri and Dharmapuri districts.

== Gallery ==
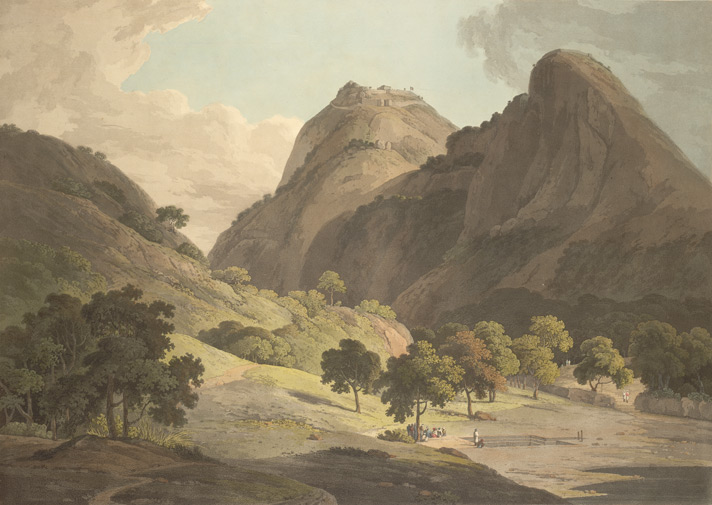
