= Transport in Krishnagiri =

Krishnagiri, headquarters of Krishnagiri District, which is the Northern Gateway to Tamil Nadu, is well connected to all parts of south India by a strong network of national highways.

== Roads ==
Transport via road in Krishnagiri district has gained much significance from the past, because of its location in the Chennai-Bengaluru Industrial corridor. Hosur SIPCOT (ever expanding sector of Tamil Nadu), Krishnagiri SIDCO and industries in other parts of this district such as the granite industry and mango pulp processing industry are much dependent on these road networks.

=== National highways at a glance ===
The following national highways originate from Krishnagiri.

- Krishnagiri–Ranipet (NH-46)
- Pondicherry (city)–Krishnagiri (NH-66)
- Krishnagiri–Madanapalli (NH-219)
- Varanasi–Kanyakumari via Krishnagiri (NH-7), the longest National Highway of India connecting Varanasi–Kanyakumari passes through it.
- Hosur–Dobbaspet (NH-207)

Of the above, NH 46 highway is under the Golden Quadrilateral project. It has been converted to a four-lane/six-lane strip by the Ministry of Road Transport and Highways.

The NH7 (North South Corridor) highway has recently undergone expansion to allow increased traffic access from Bangalore/Hosur to Krishnagiri.

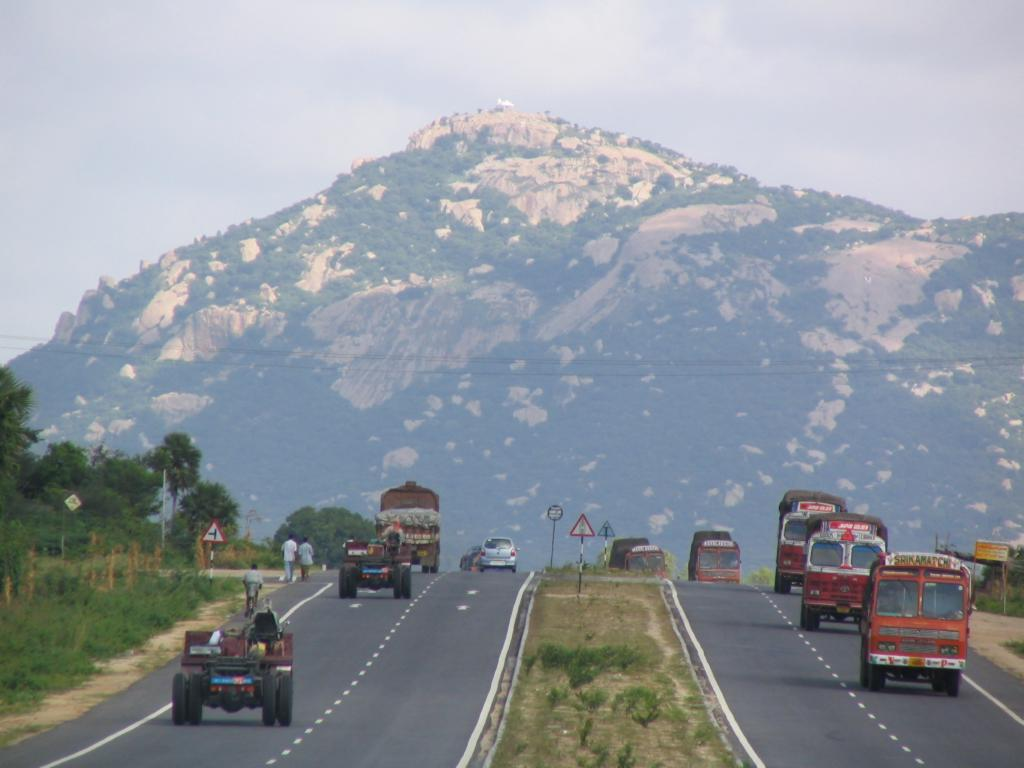
View of the mountain-clad NH path

Stretch of national highways

S. no.	Route	NH no.	Length in km.
1	Kanniyakumari–Varanasi	7	2460
2	Krishnagiri–Ranipet	46	144
3	Pondicherry–Krishnagiri	66	214
4	Krishnagiri–Madanapalli	219	175
5	Sarjapur–Bagalur–Hosur	207	155

Apart from this, state highways and district highways link almost all the towns and villages of the district. Four national highways converge at the headquarters of this district is unique.

=== State highways at a glance ===
The following are the list of state highways running in the district. The villages and towns encircling these state highways are densely populated and agricultural settlements are found in abundance.

S. no.	Route	SH no.	Length in km.
1	Malur – Hosur – Adhiyamaancottah Road	17	101.8
2	Salem – Uthangarai – Tirupattur – Vaniyambadi	18	125
3	Hogenekkal – Dharmapuri – Pochampalli – Tirupattur Road	60A	96.6
4	Rayakottai – Attibele	85	35
5	Barugur – Tirupattur	131	34.2

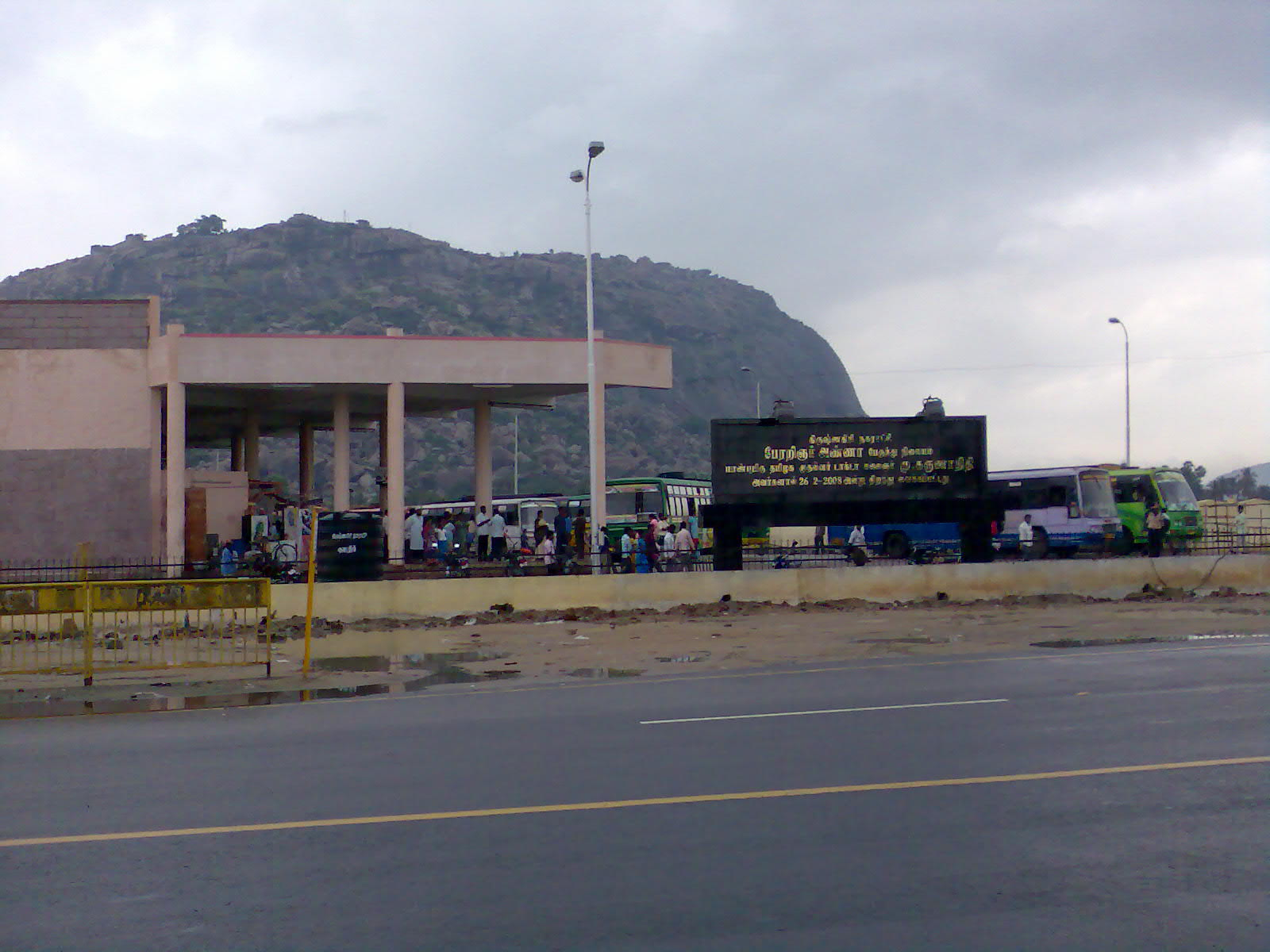
Krishnagiri Bus Terminus

=== Government transport corporations ===
TNSTC, Salem of Dharmapuri region, formerly known as Annai Sathya Transport Corporation (ASTC), operates buses in this district. As this is bordered by adjacent states, inter-state coverage is also met. These buses connect Hosur and Krishnagiri to all major towns and cities in Tamil Nadu. Town buses connect important towns and villages of this district. Nearby corporations operating buses in this district include TNSTC Vellore region, TNSTC Salem region, TNSTC Tiruvannamalai and region. It has two TNSTC depots, Krishnagiri Nagar and Krishnagiri Puranagar.

Apart from this, SETC, Tamil Nadu and KSRTC, Karnataka also ply in this district thereby enhancing the speedy linking of all the towns in the express tracks of national highways.

One can see the latest types of omnibuses running in the roads of this district at the night times whether it may be royal Mercedes Benz of KSRTC or giant Volvo buses of private operators.

Private operators include KPN travels, Mettur Super Services, Sri Vijayalakshmi travels, and Kalaimagal travels.

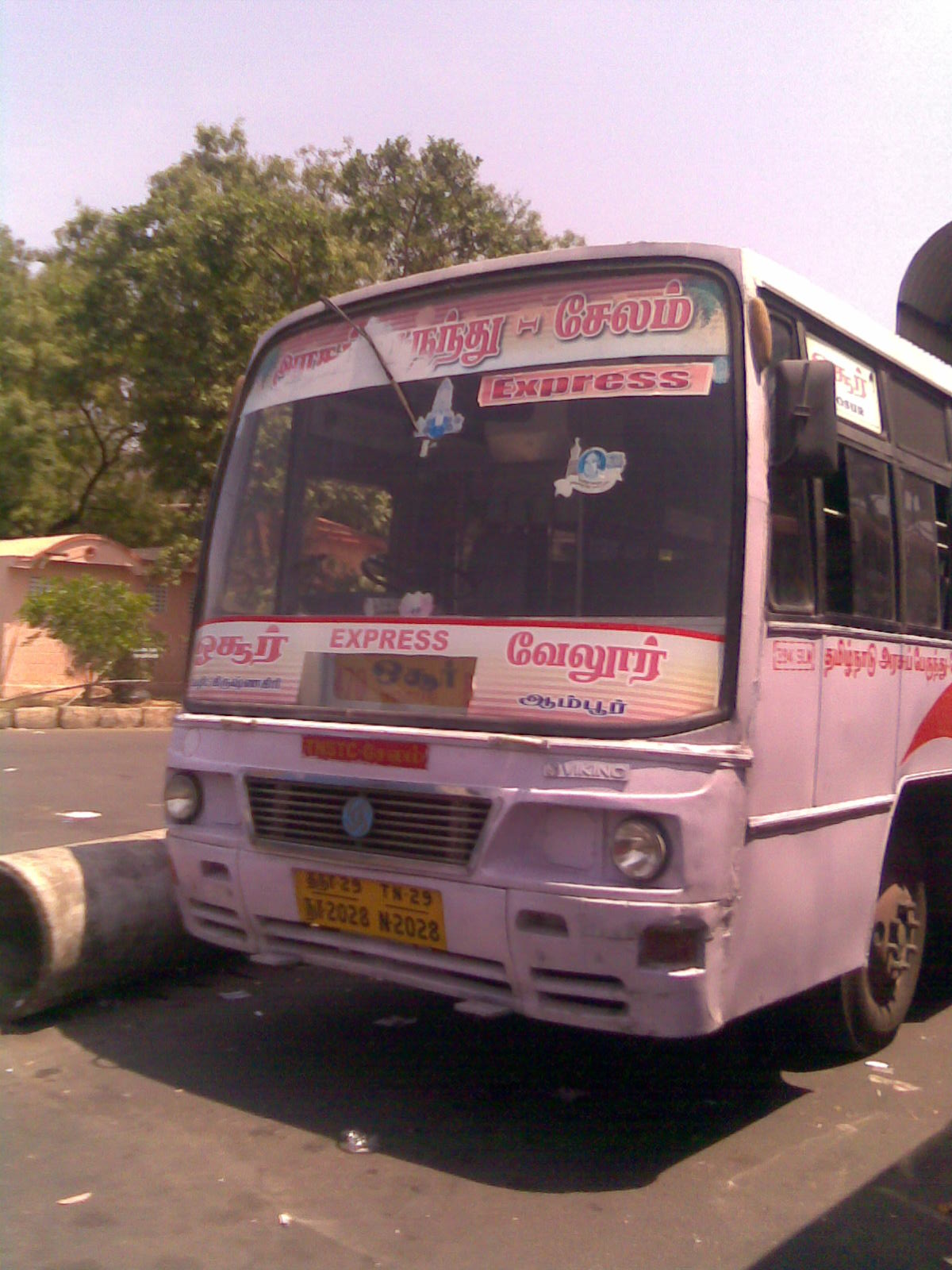
TNSTC bus at Krishnagiri, Hosur bound

=== Major bus stations ===
Krishnagiri municipality has two bus terminus in its limit:

- Perarignar Anna Moffusil Bus terminus (inter/intrastate buses ply from here)
- Oldpet Town Bus terminus (intra town/nearby village routes operation)

Hosur is now facilitated with a new integrated bus terminus named after former Hosur town panchayat president K. Appavu Pillai, the K. Appavu Pillai Memorial Bus Terminus. Town and Moffusil routes both are operated here.

== Railways ==
Railways are not on a par with the roadways in this district. It includes the Salem-Bengaluru broad gauge line with a station at Hosur Railway Station (45 km from Krishnagiri). It is the Railway Budget 2011–12 which is about to revamp railway network in this district by means of new stretch between Jolarpet-Hosur via Barugur, Krishnagiri. This when completed enables the linking of the district with the state capital Chennai.

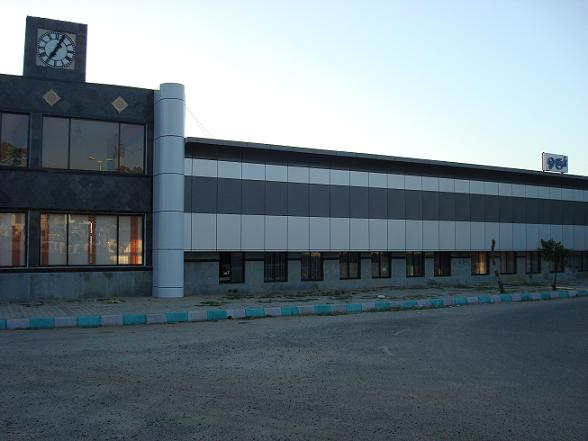
Hosur Railway Station

== Airways ==
The nearest commercial international airports are Bengaluru International Airport (92 km), Coimbatore International Airport (230 km), Chennai International Airport (244 km), and Tiruchirapalli International Airport (259 km). Salem Airport (110 km) is a domestic airport. Hosur Airport, a private licensed airfield/aerodrome operated by Taneja Aerospace & Aviation, also exists in the district.
