= Samanthamalai =

Coordinates: 12°34′33″N 78°11′37″E

Samanthamalai (Samantha= Kula and Malai=Peak) is a panchayat in Veppanapalli Taluk in Krishnagiri district of Tamil Nadu, India. The place were part of Adi Karnataka (Right Hand) or Samanta Kula have settled. It is located in 8 kilometres (5.0 mi) north of District headquarters Krishnagiri,14 kilometres (8.7 mi) from Veppanapalli. 268 km from State capital Chennai. and 87 kilometres (54 mi) from Bangalore. Its Pincode is 635115.

== Demographics ==
According to the 2011 Census of India, Samanthamalai had a population of approximately 3,000 out of which male percentage was 49% and female percentage was 51% approximately.

Samanthamalai majority religion group is Hindus, and minority are of Christianity. Widely spoken languages in the village include Tamil, Kannada and Telugu.

== Transport ==
Samanthamalai village is well connected to National Highway 44 and KGF state Highway. Also public transports (Bus no 55) are frequently available with in the village and share auto's are also available.

== Places ==
Samanthamalai Panchayat consists of the following villages:

- Guddur
- Chinna Guddur
- Ondiyur
- Pachikanapalli
- Pethampatti

== Schools ==
- Govt Primary School, Samanthamalai
- Govt High School, Kundarapalli Ramapuram
- Sri Sathya Sai Bala Gurukulam, Kundarapalli
- Sri Saraswathi Vidyalaya Matric Higher Secondary School, Kundarapalli X Road
