= Pochampalli =

Pochampalle, Pochampalli or Pochampally may refer to:

- Pochampalli, Tamil Nadu, a town in Krishnagiri district, Tamil Nadu, India
  - Pochampalli taluk
- Bhoodan Pochampally, a mandal in Nalgonda district, Telangana, India
  - Pochampally sari, made in Boodhan Pochampally
- Gundlapochampalli, or Gundla Pochampalli, a village in Rangareddy district, Telangana, India
