= Krishnagiri Dam =

Dam in Tamil Nadu, India

Krishnagiri-Dam
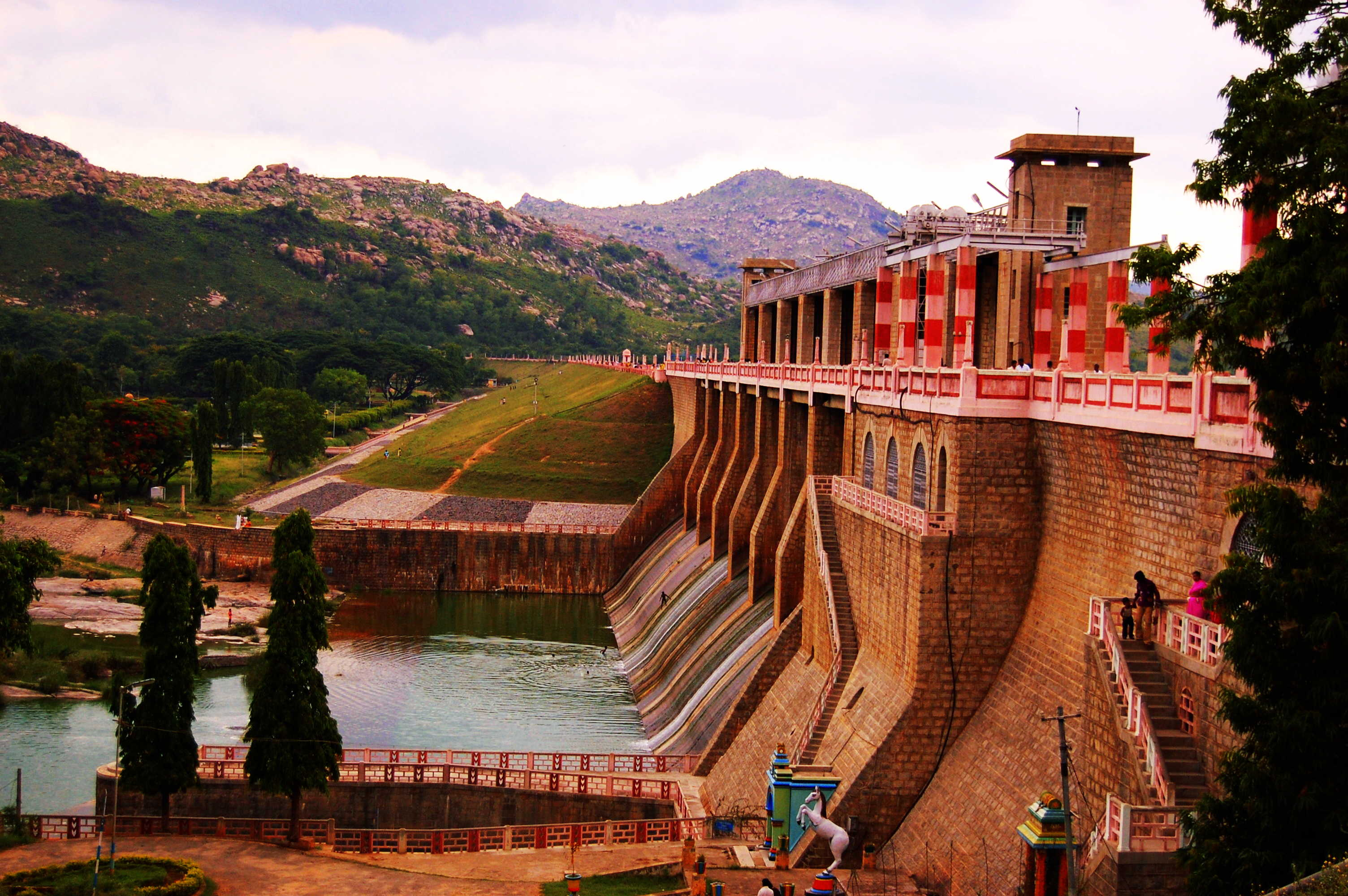
- Krishnagiri Dam

- Location in Tamil Nadu, India
- Official name: Krishnagiri Reservoir Project Dam
- Country: India
- Location: Krishnagiri district, Tamil Nadu
- Coordinates: 12°29′37.44″N 78°10′41.51″E
- Purpose: Irrigation
- Status: Operational
- Construction began: 1955
- Opening date: 1957
- Construction cost: ₹15.9 million

Dam and spillways
- Type of dam: Gravity
- Impounds: Ponniar River
- Height (foundation): 29.26 m (96 ft)
- Length: 990.59 m (3,250 ft)
- Spillways: 8
- Spillway type: OGEE
- Spillway capacity: 4,061 m^{3}/s (143,400 cu ft/s)

Reservoir
- Creates: Krishnagiri Reservoir
- Total capacity: 68.2 MCM
- Catchment area: 5,428.43 km^{2} (2,095.93 sq mi)

The Krishnagiri Dam is a dam that spans the Thenpennai River by the village of Dhuduganahalli, located in the Krishnagiri district, Tamil Nadu, India. The Krishnagiri Dam is also known as Krishnagiri Reservoir Project (KRP) Dam. The KRP Dam is located 7 km (4.3 mi) from Krishnagiri, between Dharmapuri and Krishnagiri which irrigates thousands of acres of land around Krishnagiri. The dam has been operational since 10 November 1957, inaugurated by the Chief Minister of Tamil Nadu K. Kamaraj.

== History ==
The KRP Dam Project was proposed in the First Five Year Plans of India and started in the year 1955. The Dam works are completed in the Second Five Year Plans of India and is operational from 1958. The project was inaugurated by the Chief Minister of Tamil Nadu K. Kamaraj. This is one of the major irrigation schemes planned in Kamaraj's period . The other projects are Lower Bhavani, Mani Muthuar, Cauvery delta, Aarani River, Vaigai Dam, Amravathi, Sathanur, Pullambadi, Parambikulam and Neyaru Dams.

The approved cost of the project is ₹20.2 million. The project was completed within ₹15.9 million (Actual cost). The project is covered under CADA (Command Area Development Authority) Scheme.

== Dimensions ==
The KRP dam is 990.59 m long and Max Height of the dam is 29.26 meters above Foundation. Total Volume content of Dam is 509 thousand cubic meters. The Spillway is ogee crest type and the crest level is 483.11 meters. The capacity of the Spillway is 4061 cu. meters with a designed flood capacity of 4233.33 Cu. meters. There are eight spillway gates of sixe 12.19 x 6.10 meters.

The water level is at its maximum of 484.63 metres, for which the Full Reservoir Level is 483.11 metres. The catchment area for the Krishnagiri Reservoir is 5428.43Sq. km. The initial gross storage capacity of the dam was 68.2 MCM. However due heavy sedimentation, the dam's capacity as of 2006 was 47.16 MCM (million cubic meters) only

== Tourist attraction ==
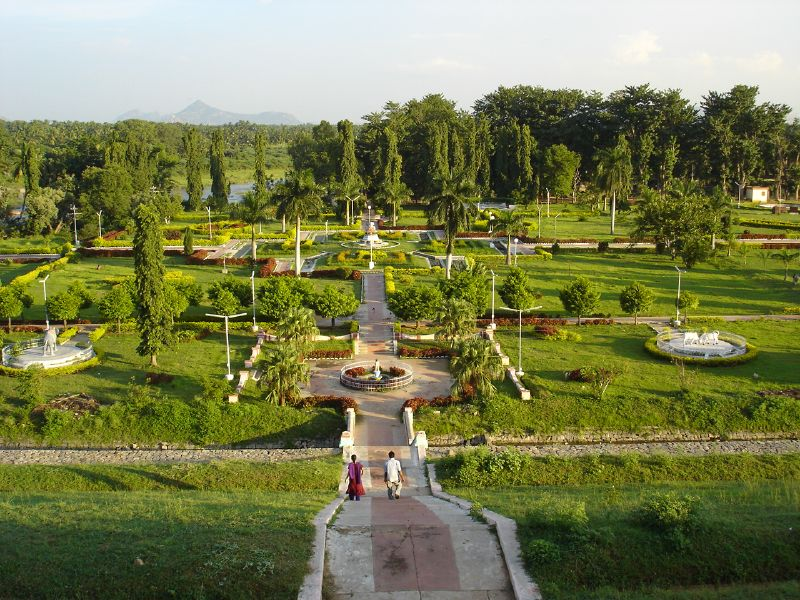
KRP Dam Park

The KRP Dam Park near the KRP Dam is developed and maintained by Tamil Nadu Public Works Department. This is a famous tourist spot. This dam is flooded with tourists during the weekends.

The entry ticket for a person is ₹5. There is two wheeler and four wheeler parking facility available near the park. There are monkeys around the park. The park has children's play area, fountains, lawn and jogger footpath. The KRP Dam and the park is suitable to visit throughout the year. The park is open all days of the week.

== Irrigation and agriculture ==
The Krishnagiri Medium Irrigation Project is a medium major medium irrigation project in Tamil Nadu. Farmers in Periyamuthur, Sundekuppam, Thimmapuram, Souteaalli, Thalialli, Kalvealli, Kundalapatti, Mittaalli, Erraalli, Penneswaramadam, Kaveripattinam, Balekuli, Marichettihalli, Nagojanaalli, Janapparuralli and Paiyur would benefit. The Culturable Command Area (CCA) as well as Ultimate Irrigation Potential of the Krishnagiri Medium Irrigation Project is 3.65 Th ha.

== See also ==
- Thenpennai River
- Krishnagiri
- Public Work Department Tamil Nadu
