= Polupalli =

- Town
- Location in Tamil Nadu, India Polupalli (India)
- Coordinates: 12°35′14.492″N 78°9′31.965″E
- Country: India
- State: Tamil Nadu
- District: Krishnagiri
- Elevation: 700 m (2,300 ft)

Population (2011)
  - Total: 7,703

Languages
  - Official: Tamil
- Time zone: UTC+5:30 (IST)

Polupalli is a Census Town in Krishnagiri district, Tamil Nadu. Polupalli SIDCO Industrial Estate is located here. It is located North-West of Krishnagiri on NH 7. It is 6 km from Krishnagiri, 35 km (22 mi) from Hosur and 70 km (43 mi) from Bangalore.

== Demographics ==
As of 2001 census, Polupalli had a population of 2,703 with 1393 males and 1310 females. The literacy rate is 70%, higher than the national average of 59.5%.

== Economy and industry ==
Polupalli is primarily an agricultural town with access to fresh water via the nearby river and mountain aquifers. The government has recently built a school, community hall, closed sewer system, and homes for the residents.

Collector V.K. Shanmugam inaugurated a new building of the Kasturba Gandhi Balika Vidyalaya at Polupalli. He has led an effort to eradicate female feticide in the district.
