= Bargur taluk =

Bargur Taluk
- Taluk
- Location in Tamil Nadu, India
- Coordinates: 12.55°N 78.37°E
- Country: India
- State: Tamil Nadu
- District: Krishnagiri

Languages
  - Official: Tamil
- Time zone: UTC+5:30 (IST)
- PIN: 635 104
- Telephone code: (91)4343 355
- Vehicle registration: TN-24

Bargur taluk is one of the seven taluks of Krishnagiri district, in Tamil Nadu, India. The headquarters of the taluk is the town panchayat of Bargur. The taluk is bordered by the Chittoor district of Andhra Pradesh to the north, Tirupattur district to the east, Pochampalli taluk to the south, and Krishnagiri taluk to the west. National Highways 42, 48, and 77 pass through the taluk.
