= Ammankovilpati =

Coordinates: 12.26232°N 78.38517°E

Ammankovilpati Ammankovil Pathi
- Village
- Interactive map of Ammankovilpati
- Country: India
- State: Tamil Nadu
- District: Krishnagiri
- Taluk: Pochampalli taluk

Ammankovilpati is a village in Pochampalli taluk, Krishnagiri district, Tamil Nadu, India.
