= Athimugam =

Coordinates: 12.753405°N 77.97516°E

- Village
- அத்திமுகம்
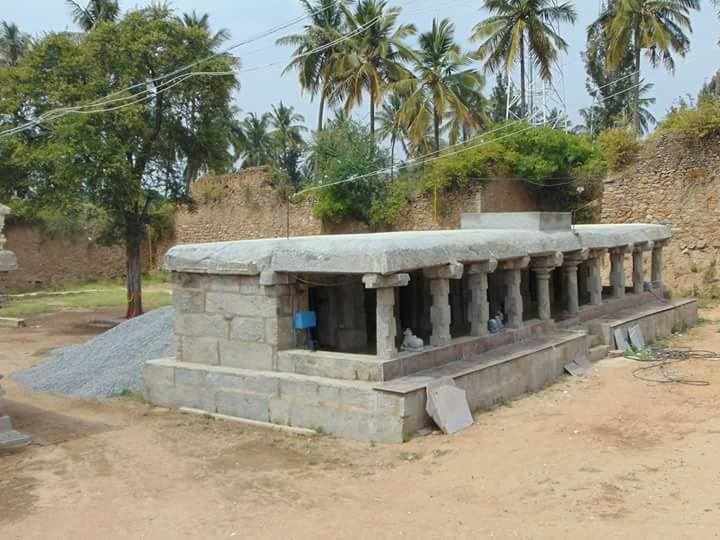
- Sri Alageshwara Swamy Temple
- Interactive map of Athimugam
- Country: India
- State: Tamil Nadu
- District: Krishnagiri
- Taluk: Shoolagiri
- Named for: Temple in the Village

Government
  - Type: Panchayat President
  - Panchayat President: Suresh

Languages
  - Official: Telugu, Tamil, kannada, Urdu
- Time zone: UTC+5:30 (IST)
- PIN: 635105
- Vehicle registration: TN 70

Athimugam is a village in the Shoolagiri taluk of Krishnagiri district, Tamil Nadu, India.

== Etymology ==
Athimugam is also called "Hasthimukam" meaning "elephant face", after a local Hindu temple deity.

== Location ==
Athimugam township is located near the border of Tamil Nadu state and is in the state of Tamil Nadu. The nearest city is Hosur, approximately 21 kilometres (13 mi) to the east. Athimugam village is on the Hosur - Perandapalli - Berigai road .

In this village have 2 Masjids

1) Masjid E Rasheediya (New Masjid)

2) Masjid E Ahle Sunnat (Old Masjid)

== Services ==
Athimugam is a small service centre for the local farming community. It has a bus service, postal service, bank, schools and medical clinics. Petrol and groceries are available. There are a number of small temples in and around the village.
