= Pothapuram =

Coordinates: 12°23′39″N 78°12′32″E

Pothapuram is a village in the Krishnagiri district of the state of Tamil Nadu, in India. The postal code of Pothapuram is 635112.

== Schools ==
Government Primary School established in 1954 that is managed by the local body. The school caters for grades 1 to 8. It is co-educational and it doesn't have an attached pre-primary section. The language used in the school is Tamil. The school has a library with 1077 books. A midday meal is provided and prepared on the premises.

== Societies ==
REST Society for Research International is located at 292, TNHB Colony, Pothapuram, Krishnagiri, Tamil Nadu, India
