= Deveerahalli =

Coordinates: 12.314514°N 78.274122°E

Deveerahalli is a village located in Krishnagiri district of North Western Tamil Nadu. It is located at the confluence of Tamil Nadu, Karnataka and Andhra Pradesh. It is situated on the banks of Then (South) Pennaiyar. Its postal code is 635123. It is a scenic village located amidst hills with visitors coming from all around the world during the summer season.

== History ==
It has a long history dating back to the Megalithic period with several artefacts from the period. It used to be the winter capital of the Chola Empire for a brief period of time, a history that has been forgotten. Some residents of the village can still trace their ancestry back to ancient Chola Kings.

== People ==
It has a population of around 7000. Tamil is the mother tongue of most people while Kannada and English are also widely spoken. Thus, many people are polyglots. It is a progressive village with many inter-caste marriages on record, more than any other village in Northern Tamil Nadu.

== Economy ==
Agriculture and Tourism are the main sources of income for the people. It is a scenic village filled with coconut, mango and palm trees. Many mango juice processing units are located near Deveerahalli from where mango-based products are exported all around the world. October to February is the peak tourist season when visitors from all around the world come to see the harvest and enjoy the cool weather. They also take part in many of the local cultural events dating back to ancient times.

== Education ==
A Government High School is also situated in the village that provides education up to 10th standard.
