= Kothapalli, Tamil Nadu =

Coordinates: 12°50′05″N 77°49′57″E

Kothapalli is a village in the Krishnagiri district, Tamil Nadu
