= Kathujuganapalli =

Kattiganapalli கட்டிகானபள்ளி Kattiigaanapalli
- Town
- Location in Tamil Nadu, India Kattiganapalli (India)
- Coordinates: 12.52777°N 78.2054°E
- Country: India
- State: Tamil Nadu
- District: Krishnagiri
- Elevation: 495 m (1,624 ft)

Population (2011)
  - Total: 22,714

Languages
  - Official: Tamil
- Time zone: UTC+5:30 (IST)

Kattiganapalli is a census town in Krishnagiri district in the Indian state of Tamil Nadu.It is suburb of Krishnagiri city.

== Demographics ==
As of 2001 India census, Kattiganapalli had a population of 15,488. Males constitute 51% of the population and females 49%. Kattiganapalli has an average literacy rate of 73%, higher than the national average of 59.5%: male literacy is 79%, and female literacy is 66%. In Kattigaanapalli, 12% of the population is under 6 years of age.
