= Samalpatti railway station =

Railway station in India

Samalpatti station

General information
- Location: India
- Coordinates: 12.3109°N 78.48287°E
- System: Junction
- Owner: Indian Railways
- Platforms: 2
- Tracks: 4

Construction
- Parking: Available
- Cycle facilities: Available

Other information
- Station code: SLY
- Fare zone: Southern Railways
Location
- Location within Tamil Nadu Location within India

Samalpatti railway station (station code: SLY) is an NSG–6 category Indian railway station in Salem railway division of Southern Railway zone. It is located in Krishnagiri District, Tamil Nadu. It is the nearest railway station to Uthangarai and around villages.

== Projects and development ==
It is one of the 73 stations in Tamil Nadu to be named for upgradation under Amrit Bharat Station Scheme of Indian Railways.
