= Perumal Rasu =

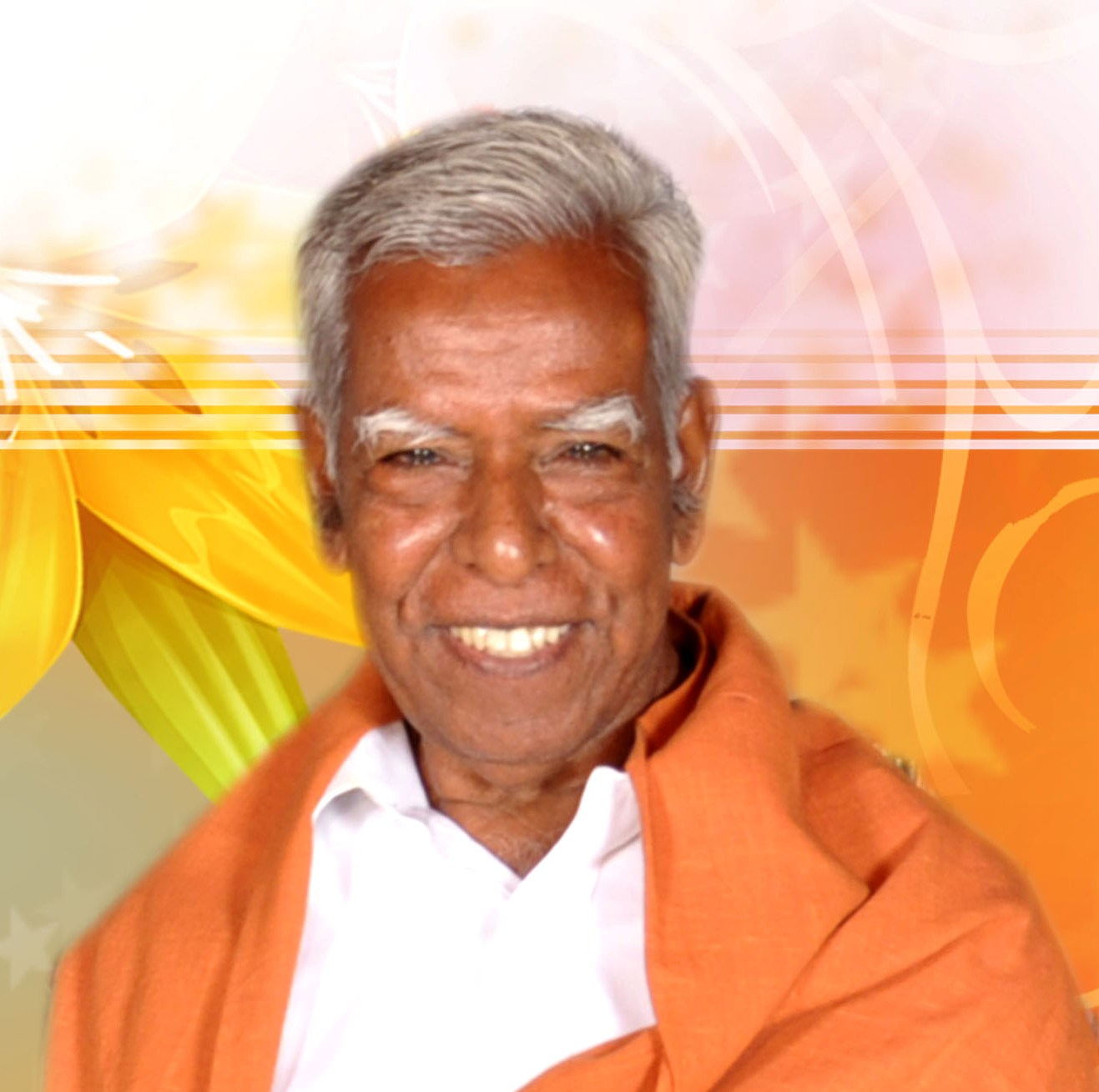
- R. Perumal Rasu
- Born: 19 November 1931 (age 94); Krishnagiri, Krishnagiri District, Tamil Nadu, British India
- Known for: Painter, Poet, Writer, Martial Artist, Spiritual Master
- Spouse: Mahalakshmi

Perumal Rasu (born 19 November 1931) is an Indian poet and a writer from Krishnagiri, Krishnagiri District, Tamil Nadu.

Perumal Rasu is also a painter, martial artist, and Spiritual master. His followers consider him a great soul (Sanskrit: Mahatma) and address him as Karumalai Siddhar (English: Saint of Krishnagiri). He is a devotee of Yogi Ramsuratkumar, popularly known as "Visiri samiyar"

== Notable works ==
- Pranava Pravagam (Tamil: பிரணவப் பிரவாகம்)
- Prapanja Kavidhaigal (Tamil: பிரபஞ்சக் கவிதைகள்)
- Aanandha Paravasam (Tamil: ஆனந்த பரவசம்)
- Gnana Thooral (Tamil: ஞானத் தூறல்)
- Vidiyalai Thaedi (Tamil: விடியலைத் தேடி)
- Koodal Sangamam (Tamil: கூடல் சங்கமம்)
- Unnai Thaedu (Tamil: உன்னைத் தேடு)
- Idho oru idhigaasam (Tamil: இதோ ஒரு இதிகாசம்)

His Maathiyosi (Tamil: மாத்தியோசி) was serialized in a popular regional weekly, Ananda Vikatan and won accolades. Owing to its huge popularity, the series was released as a book.
