= Nallarallapalli =

Coordinates: 12°38′46.5″N 78°0′10.5″E

Nallarallapalli is a village located near Shoolagiri in Krishnagiri district of Tamil Nadu, India, pin code is 635117. Meaning for Nallarallapalli in Telugu, Nalla for black, Ralla for rock, Palli for village. Small mountain in black colour near this place is the base for this name.

Population of this village is around 500. Majority of peoples mother tongue is Telugu and also speak Kannada and Tamil.

Agriculture is the main profession of this village. Raagi, Rice, Millets are main crops of this area. This area also having suitable climate for vegetable cropping like Tomato, Cabbage, Pudina(Mentha), coriander, etc. Coconut trees are one of the income source of farmers and also adds beautiful to area. Unfortunately, agriculture coming down due to lack of rainfall and industrialisation.

National highway(NH44) is 2 km from this village. Bengaluru is 65 km away and Chennai is 275 km away.
