= Mathur block =

Revenue block in Tamil Nadu, India

The Mathur block is a revenue block in the Krishnagiri district of Tamil Nadu, India. It has a total of 24 panchayat villages.
