= Govinda Agraharam =

Coordinates: 12°47′N 77°48′E

- village
- Interactive map of Govinda Agraharam
- Country: India
- State: Tamil Nadu
- District: Krishnagiri

Languages
  - Official: Tamil
- Time zone: UTC+5:30 (IST)

Govinda Agraharam is a village in Hosur Taluk of Krishnagiri district, Tamil Nadu, India with pincode 635126.

Two newly formed layout communities, Subham Enclave and Vishnu Anandam Villas, have been added to the village. These communities host people working in banking, IT and ITES, pharmacy, business, etc.

This village is just 2 km from SIPCOT check post/ bus stop and it is very easy to commute up and down to Hosur. It will take 30 mins to reach Electronic city.

Available facilities include groceries, vegetables, fruits, natural cow milk, spinach, saloon, fancy stores, medical stores, play school - little foot prints, tuition centers, arts and language classes, abacus classes, drinking water supply and fiber optic Internet with speeds of up to 150 MBPS.

Maharishi Vidhya Mandir is a two-minute walk and Begapalli circle is a ten-minute walk where ATM and all necessities available.

It is a quiet, pollution-free area just outside Hosur city near Attibelle.

Well connected by road. All school buses and vans will come into Govinda Agraharam. Auto facilities available. People can also use share-a-ride to commute to Bengaluru.
