= Anchetty =

- Taluk
- Location in Tamil Nadu, India Anchetty (India)
- Coordinates: 12.353961°N 77.722113°E
- Country: India
- State: Tamil Nadu
- District: Krishnagiri
- Taluk: Anchetty

Area
  - Total: 35.08 km^{2} (13.54 sq mi)

Population (2011)
  - Total: 16,578
  - Density: 472.6/km^{2} (1,224/sq mi)
- Time zone: UTC+5:30 (IST)

Anchetty is a small town in the Anchetty taluk of the Krishnagiri district of the Indian state of Tamil Nadu. The village is in the southern half of the taluk, and is the headquarters of one of its seven firkas.

== Geography ==
Anchetty, which is spread over 35.08 square kilometres (13.54 sq mi) of land, is located to the north of a large collection of reserve forests that cover the southern end of the taluk. The village is at the intersection of three roads, one which runs west to Thaggatti and Hunasanahalli, one which runs north to Andevanapalli and Denkanikottai, and one that runs southeast to Hogenakkal and Pennagaram. During Tamil Nadu's wet season, the Toddahalla River, a minor tributary of the Cauvery River, flows south through the village. The official languages areTamil, Telugu, and Kannada.

== Demographics ==
As of 2011, Anchetty had a population of 16,578 people living in 3,750 households. 8,596 of the population were male, while 7,982 were female. 2,136 children, or about 12.9% of the population, were at or below the age of 6. 8,439 people, about 50.9% of the population, were literate. 2,235 residents, about 13.5% of the population were classified by the census as Scheduled Castes or Scheduled Tribes.
