= Hosur block =

Revenue block in Tamil Nadu, India

Coordinates: 12.735°N 77.829°E

The Hosur block is a revenue block in the Krishnagiri district of Tamil Nadu, India. It has a total of 26 panchayat villages.
