= Dasampatti =

Village in Krishnagiri, Tamil Nadu, India

Dasampatti Kallavi
- village
- Location in Tamil Nadu, India Dasampatti (India)
- Coordinates: 12°15′0″N 78°27′0″E
- Country: India
- State: Tamil Nadu
- Region: Kongu Nadu
- District: Krishnagiri
- Elevation: 330 m (1,080 ft)

Languages
  - Official: Tamil
- Time zone: UTC+5:30 (IST)

Dasampatti, also called Kallavi, is a village in Krishnagiri district, Tamil Nadu, India.

Dasampatti is located at an elevation of 330 m above mean sea level.

Dasampatti has a railway station on the Salem-Jolarpet line.

The nearest airports are Salem Airport and Bangalore International Airport.

== Temples ==
The village has a temple called Vediyappan temple.
