= Kaveripattinam block =

Revenue block in Tamil Nadu, India

The Kaveripattanam block is a revenue block in the Krishnagiri district of Tamil Nadu, India. It has a total of 36 panchayat villages.
