= Shoolagiri block =

Revenue block in Tamil Nadu state, India

The Shoolagiri block is a revenue block in the Krishnagiri district of Tamil Nadu, India. It has a total of 42 panchayat villages.

List of villages in Shoolagiri block:

Kamandoddi, Haleseebam, Uddanapalli, Athimugam, Nallarallapalli, Thyagarasanapalli, Samanapalli, Etc.
