= Veppanapalli block =

Revenue block in Tamil Nadu, India

Coordinates: 12°42′08″N 78°11′34″E

Veppanapalli is a town in the Krishnagiri district of Tamil Nadu, India.

== Religious Places ==
=== Church ===
- God's Grace Church, it's an oldest, famous and Spiritual Church located in Veppanapalli. Founder and President Rev.P.T.Abraham and Pastor Gideon Smith ( Here Amazing Worship, Manifestation of God's presence, Wonderful Message and Life Reformation. )

=== Temples ===
- The Sri Kodanda Rama Swamy Temple is a Hindu shrine located in the Veppanapalli region of the Krishnagiri district in Tamil Nadu, roughly 25 km from Krishnagiri town near Bodimuthulu. It is a peaceful place of worship dedicated to Lord Rama

About the Temple Deities: The main deity is Lord Rama (Kodandarama), accompanied by Goddess Sita, Lakshmana, and Lord Hanuman. Festivals: Major Hindu festivals like Rama Navami and Hanumath Jayanthi are celebrated here by local devotees with special prayers and gatherings.Every year, in the month of March, on the occasion of Pournami, Sitarama Kalyanam, Brahmotsavam, and Pallaki Utsavam are celebrated. Local Surroundings: The temple is situated in a quiet rural setting surrounded by other regional shrines in the Veppanapalli area like the Panchamukhi Anjaneya Temple and Sri Lakshmi Narasimha Swamy Temple.

- Sri Nagareswara Temple located in Budimutlu near the Veppanapalli.
- Pachaimalai Murugan Temple, Veppanapalli to Berigai Road, Karakuppam.
- Vinayagar Temple, near Pachaimalai Murugan Temple, Karakuppam.
- Omshakthi Temple, near Pachaimalai Murugan Temple, Karakuppam
- Panjamuga Anjineyar Kovil, Veppanapalli
- Saneesvarar Kovil, Veppanapalli
- Mariyamman Kovil, Jedukothur
- Basaveswaran Temple, Avalnatham
- Basaveswara Temple, Gollapalli
- Basaveswara Temple, Berigai main road, near Theertham, Podur.
- Sri Anjanaya Temple, Jedukothur, Nachikuppam Panchayat, Krishnagiri Dt
- Sri Badrakaaliyamman Temple, Sigaramaagaanapalli, near Veppanapalli
- Shri Raja Rajeshwari Sametha Chandra Mouleshwara Swamy Temple, Gounder Street, Veppanapalli.
- Sri malleshwara swamy temple konganapalli village, sigaramakanapalli post, vepanappali union

=== Mosques ===
- Jamia Masjid, Veppanapalli.
- Madina Masjid, bus stand, Veppanapalli
- Ghousiya Masjid, near register office, Veppanapalli
- Qhuba Masjid, Veppanapalli
- Suhail Masjid, PGB Petrol Bunk, Veppanapalli

== Schools ==
- Government Girls Higher Secondary School Veppanapalli
- Government Boys Higher Secondary School Veppanapalli
- P.U.P school, Veppanapalli
- Vailankani Matric Higher Secondary School, Veppanapalli
- Omm Sri Kalaivani School Veppanapalli
- SRI VIDYA VIKAS NURSERY AND PRIMARY SCHOOL VEPPANAPALLI
- Manavaranapalli Govt Higher Secondary School, Manavaranapalli
- Shri Maruthi Matric Higher Secondary School, V. Madepalli
- Sri Sathya Sai Higher Secondary School, Kundarapalli
- Sri Saraswathi Matric Higher Secondary School Ideal Academy (CBSE), Kundharapalli
