= Kundalapatty =

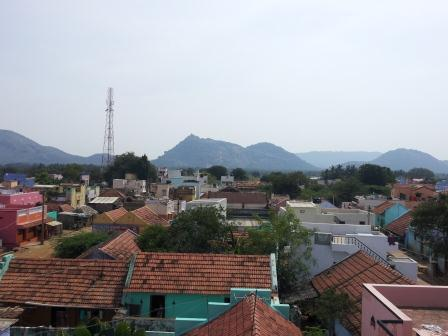

Kundalapatty is a village in the Nilakkottai Taluk in Dindigul District secret in Tamil Nadu, India.

It has a population nearly 2,000. This village contains multi-lingual people speaking Tamil, Telugu and Kannada. People in this village do cultivation, business and information technology jobs.

== Occupations ==
- Citizens of this village are doing IT jobs in foreign countries like, Switzerland, Japan and US.
- Doing business in South Africa, Sri Lanka, Malaysia and Singapore.
- Working on various jobs in Dubai, Kuwait and Saudi Arabia.
- Working in bigger manufacturing companies in Chennai like Hyundai, Kiml, Shardha motors, Ador welding, etc.

== Temples ==
- Arulmigu Balamurugan Temple
- Arulmigu Muthaalamman Temple
- Sri Sastha Temple
- Sri Pommaiyaswamy Temple
- Srinivasa Perumal Temple
- Arulmigu Aadhi Sakthi Veeriyakari Amman Temple
- 18m padi karuppasamy temple
- Angalaparameshwari Temple
- and 20+ temples are there
