= Nagojanahalli =

- Town
- Location in Tamil Nadu, India
- Coordinates: 12°23′22″N 78°17′32″E
- Country: India
- State: Tamil Nadu
- District: krishnagiri
- Elevation: 515 m (1,690 ft)

Population (2011)
  - Total: 9,953

Languages
  - Official: Tamil
- Time zone: UTC+5:30 (IST)
- Postal code: 635204
- Vehicle registration: TN 24

Nagojanahalli is a panchayat town in krishnagiri district in the Indian state of Tamil Nadu. Nagojanahalli is also called Nagarasampatti.

== Demographics ==
According to the 2011 India census, Nagojanahalli had a population of 9953. Males constitute 51% of the population and females made up 49% of the population. Nagojanahalli has an average literacy rate of 60%, higher than the national average of 59.5%. Male literacy is 70%, and female literacy is 49%. 12% of the population is under 6 years of age.
