= National Highway 77 (India) =

National Highway in India

National Highway 77
- Map of the National Highway in red

Route information
- Length: 177.0 km (110.0 mi)

Major junctions
- West end: NH 48 in Krishnagiri
- NH 179A in Uthangarai; NH 38 / NH 179B in Tiruvannamalai
- East end: NH 32 in Tindivanam

Location
- Country: India
- States: Tamil Nadu
- Primary destinations: Uthangarai -Tiruvannamalai – Gingee

Highway system
- Roads in India; Expressways; National; State; Asian
← NH 48	→ NH 32

National Highway 77 (NH 77) is a National Highway in India. This is the main National Highway to connect Pondicherry with Krishnagiri. It starts from Tindivanam in Villupuram district then runs westward till Uthangarai via Thiruvannamalai and then joins NH 48 at Krishnagiri. NH-77 runs entirely in the state of Tamil Nadu.

== Route ==
NH48 near Krishnagiri, Uthangarai, Tiruvannamalai, Gingee, NH32 near Tindivanam

== See also ==
- List of national highways in India
- National Highways Development Project
