= Shoolagiri =

- Town
- Shoolagiri (Trident) Hill

- Location in Tamil Nadu, India
- Coordinates: 12.664°N 78.012°E
- Country: India
- State: Tamil Nadu
- District: Krishnagiri district

Population (2011)
  - Total: 9,430

Languages
  - Official: Tamil
- Time zone: UTC+5:30 (IST)
- PIN: 635117
- Telephone code: 04344

Shoolagiri is a large village and Taluk in the Krishnagiri district of Tamil Nadu. It lies along National Highway 7, and is overlooked by a hill with three peaks.

Shoolagiri is a cosmopolitan town with a mix of linguistic groups. Tamil is the official and spoken language, however there are also a significant number of Telugu and Kannada speakers in the town.

== Etymology ==
Shoolagiri's name is derived from Hill, which is like Trident (Threesulam).

== Places of interest ==
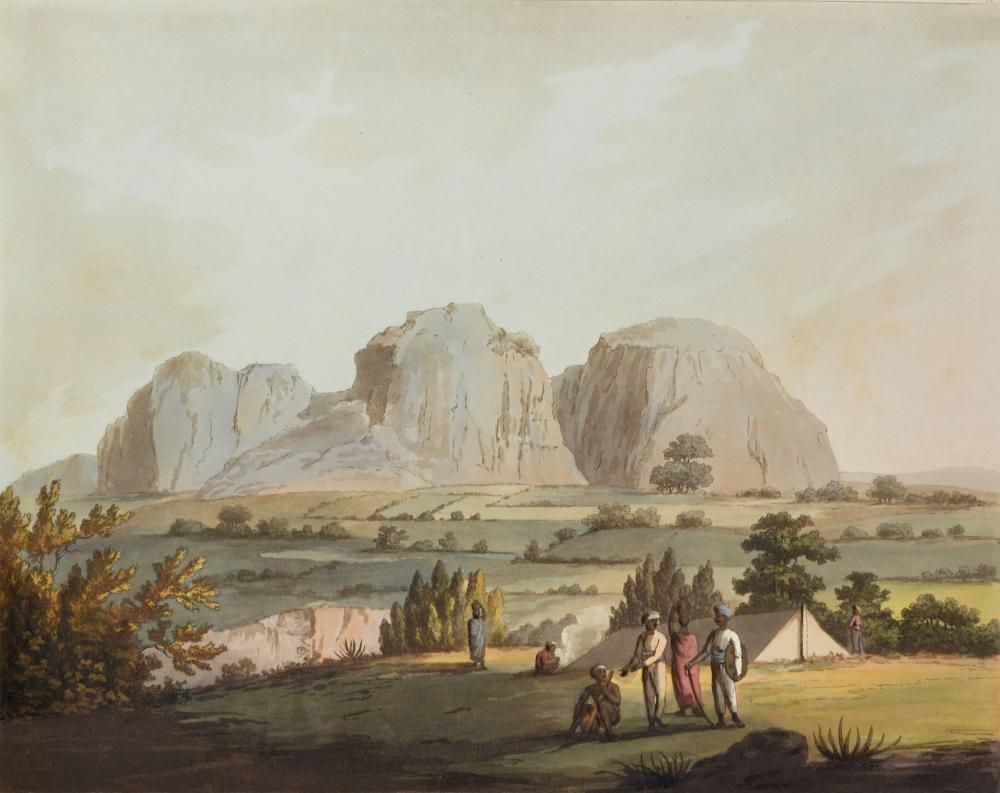
East view of Shole Ghurry, from the Camp at Arnee in 1792, by James Hunter

=== Varadaraja Perumal Temple ===
The Varadaraja Perumal Temple in Shoolagiri is a Hindu temple dedicated to Lord Vishnu. The temple is glorified in the Mahabharatha by Vyasa as Bholoka Vaikuntham and worshiped by the Pandavas. The temple is classified as one of the 108 Abhimana Kshethrams of the Vaishnavate tradition.

=== Our Lady of Velankanni Church ===
Our Lady of Velankanni Church is a Roman Catholic church located on the service road between Bangalore and Chennai Highway NH 44 at Shoolagiri. Highway travelers refer to this church as the Guardian of our Journey Velankanni Church. About 70 catholic families are the members of this parish church. St. Antony's Church, which was the old Catholic church of Shoolagiri now became a sub-station of this church.

== Demographics ==
As of the 2011 Census, Shoolagiri had population of 9,530. There are 1,218 children aged 6 or under, which is 12.78% of the village population. The literacy rate was 77.03%, lower than the Tamil Nadu state average of 80.09%.

== Gallery ==
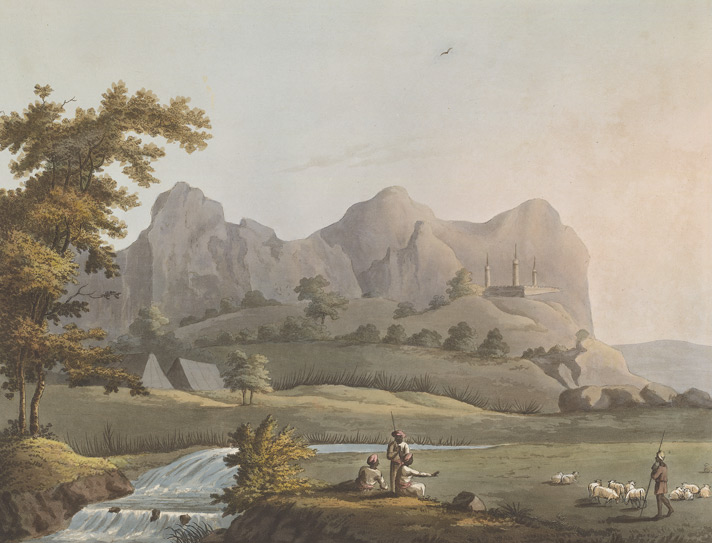

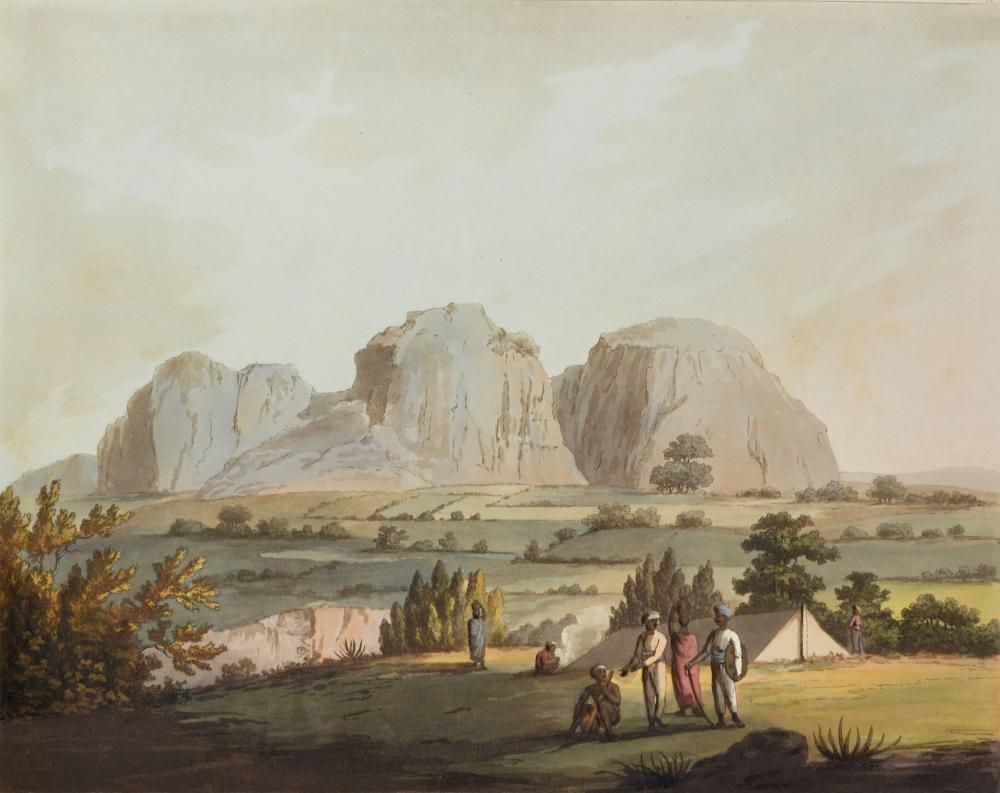

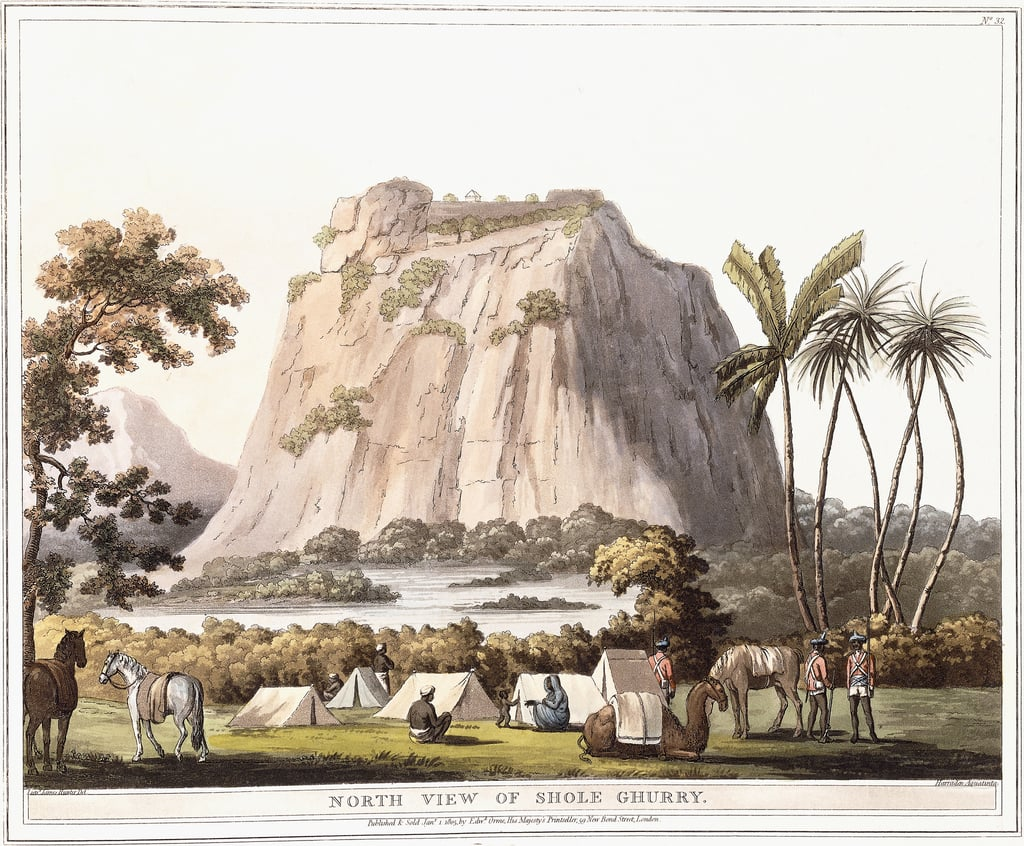
