= Krishnagiri taluk =

Coordinates: 12°31′30.293″N 78°13′0.51″E

Krishnagiri Taluk is a taluk of Krishnagiri district of the Indian state of Tamil Nadu. The headquarters is the municipal town of Krishnagiri which is about 255 km from Chennai, state capital. Taluk office is located on the Bengaluru road-Dharmaraja Temple road junction.

== Demographics ==
According to the 2011 census, the taluk of Krishnagiri had a population of 603,306 with 304,187 males and 299,119 females. There were 983 women for every 1,000 men. The taluk had a literacy rate of 65.59%. Child population in the age group below 6 years were 33,536 Males and 30,989 Females.

== See also ==
- Krishnagiri
- Krishnagiri District
