= Samalpatti =

- Town
- Location in Tamil Nadu, India Samalpatti (India)
- Coordinates: 12°18′40.433″N 78°29′6.187″E
- Country: India
- State: Tamil Nadu
- Region: Kongu Nadu
- District: Krishnagiri
- Elevation: 346 m (1,135 ft)

Population
  - Total: 11,750

Languages
  - Official: Tamil
- Time zone: UTC+5:30 (IST)

Samalpatti is a town in Uthanagarai Taluk in Krishnagiri district, Tamil Nadu, India. Samalpatti is a main railway station in Krishnagiri district. It lies in NH 77. It is 40 km from Krishnagiri and 10 km from Uthangarai.

== Nearest railway stations ==
Samalpatti Railway Station	0.1 km.
Dasampatti railway station	8.3 km.
Tirupattur Jn railway station	22.4 km.
Morappur railway station	23.0 km.
Jolarpettai railway station	29.3 km.

== Nearest villages ==
- Subbramaniya Nagar (NGS Nagar)
- Gullampatti
- Kanichi
- Oddapatti
- Parasanur
- Jogipatti
- Nagalpatti
- S.Motur
- Pasanthi
- Kumarampatti

== Schools ==
- Government Higher Secondary School Samalpatti
- Vijay Christ Primary School Samalpatti
- Gerigapalli Hsr School
- Crist Matric School Suresh
- Vetri Vikas Matriculation School Oddapatti
- Govt Boys Higher Secondary School Uthangarai
- Govt. Girls Higher Secondary School Uthangarai
- Government Higher Sec School Karappattu

== Nearest School ==
- RPS Matriculation School, Pappanur
- Dheeran Chinnamalai School (CBSC)

== Nearest College ==
- Adhiyaman Arts & Science College for Women

== Temples ==
- Sri Vinayagar and Mariyamman Kovil Temple, Samalpatti
- Sri Kanichi Perumal Temple, Kanichi
- Sri Periya Muthu Mariyamman Temple, Subbramaniya Nagar
- Sri Kolkata Kali Amman temple

== Nearest Temple ==
- Sri Ezhur Mariyamman Kovil, Thippampatti X-road

== Banks ==
- Karur Vysya Bank
- Thodakka Velanmai Kooturavu Society (Under Govt of Tamilnadu)
- Tamilnadu Grama Bank (Unit of Indian Bank)

== Offices ==
- Post Office
- VAO office
- Panchayat Office
- RI Office

== Station ==
- Police Station
- Railway station
