= Pochampalli taluk =

Pochampalli Taluk
- Taluk
- Location in Tamil Nadu, India
- Coordinates: 12.33°N 78.36°E
- Country: India
- State: Tamil Nadu
- District: Krishnagiri

Population (2011)
  - Total: 182,119

Languages
  - Official: Tamil
- Time zone: UTC+5:30 (IST)
- PIN: 635 206
- Telephone code: (91)4341
- Vehicle registration: TN-24

Pochampalli taluk is one of the seven taluks of Krishnagiri district in the Indian state of Tamil Nadu. The majority of the population speak Tamil. The headquarters of the district is at Pochampalli.

== Geography ==
Pochampalli taluk is located in the southeast of Krishnagiri district. It is bordered to the north by Bargur town and Tirupathur district, to the east and southeast by Uthangarai taluk, to the south and southwest by Dharmapuri district, and to the northwest by Krishnagiri taluk. Part of its border with the Harur taluk of Dharmpuri district is formed by the Ponnaiyar River.

== Demographics ==
In 2011, when the taluk was only one of five taluks in the district, and included parts of what is today Bargur taluk, it had a population of 182,119 people. There were 967 women for every 1,000 men. The taluk had a literacy rate of 65.3%. 10,018 males and 8,759 females, about 10.3% of the population, were at or below the age of 6.
