= Bargur =

- Town
- Nickname: Mini Surat
- Bargur, Tamil Nadu
- Coordinates: 12.5425°N 78.3572°E
- Country: India
- State: Tamil Nadu
- Region: Kongu Nadu
- District: Krishnagiri
- Taluk: Bargur

Government
  - Type: State Assembly Constituency
  - Body: Town Panchayat and Taluk
  - Member of Legislative Assembly: D. Mathiazhagan (DMK)
  - MP: K. Gopinath (INC).

Area
  - Total: 22.50 km^{2} (8.69 sq mi)
- Elevation: 503 m (1,650 ft)

Population (2011)
  - Total: 16,366
  - Density: 727.4/km^{2} (1,884/sq mi)

Languages
  - Official: Tamil
  - Spoken: Telugu, Tamil, Kannada
- Time zone: UTC+5:30 (IST)
- PIN: 635 104
- Telephone code: (91) 4343
- Vehicle registration: TN-24
- Website: http://www.krishnagiri.tn.nic.in/links.htm

Bargur is a selection-grade town panchayat in the Krishnagiri district of the Indian state of Tamil Nadu, that serves as the headquarters of Bargur taluk, one of the seven taluks in Krishnagiri district.

== History ==
The town panchayat of Bargur was created on 1 October 1969 and was upgraded to a selection grade town panchayat on 14 February 1985.

== Geography ==
Bargur is spread over an area of 22.50 square kilometres (8.69 sq mi) of land in the northeast of Krishnagiri district, at 12.5425°N 78.3572°E, at an average elevation of 532 metres (1,745 ft) above sea level. It is about 15 kilometres (9.3 mi) east of Krishnagiri along National Highway 48, which runs through the town. State Highway 131 begins in Bargur and runs southeast to Tirupattur.

== Demographics ==
As of 2011, there were 3,770 households in Bargur, which had a total population of 16,366 people. 8,316 (50.8%) of the population were male, while 8,050 (50.2%) were female. 1,810 children, about 11.1% of the town's population, were at or below the age of 6. 1,939 people in the town, about 11.8% of the population, were classified as Scheduled Castes or Scheduled Tribes. 70.9% of the population were literate. The official language of Bargur is Tamil, although Kannada and Telugu are also spoken, with Telugu speakers making up the plurality of the town's population as of 2001. In 2001, there were 6,621 Telugu speakers, 5,209 Tamil speakers, and 2,250 Kannada speakers in the town.

== Politics ==
Bargur is part of Bargur state assembly constituency, represented by E. C. Govindarasan of the AIADMK party. Bargur is part of Krishnagiri Lok Sabha constituency, which is represented in by K. Gopinath of the Indian National Congress.
