= Uthangarai =

Neighbourhood in Krishnagiri district, Tamil Nadu, India

- Location in Tamil Nadu, India
- Coordinates: 12.2637°N 78.5353°E
- Country: India
- State: Tamil Nadu
- District: Krishnagiri
- Elevation: 360.28 m (1,182.0 ft)

Languages
  - Official: Tamil language
- Time zone: UTC+5:30 (IST)
- PIN: 635207
- Telephone code: 04341
- Vehicle registration: TN-24
- Sex ratio: 944/1,000 ♂/♀

Uthangarai is a municipality on the border of the Krishnagiri district, located in the state of Tamil Nadu, India. Uthangarai is called an educational city. The SIPCOT Industrial Institute is located in Uthangarai. There are 4 districts in any industry. The districts of Krishnagiri, Dharmapuri, Thiruvannamalai and Vellore depend on any industry. Private educational institutions and public schools here are competing and premiered to be a percentage of pass percentage and statewide marks.

== Demographics ==
As of 2001 India census, Uthangarai had a total population of 15,393.
