= Krishnagiri =

City in Tamil Nadu, India

Krishnagiri கிருஷ்ணகிரி Eyil Nadu, Murasu Nadu, Kowoor Nadu, Karu Malai
- City
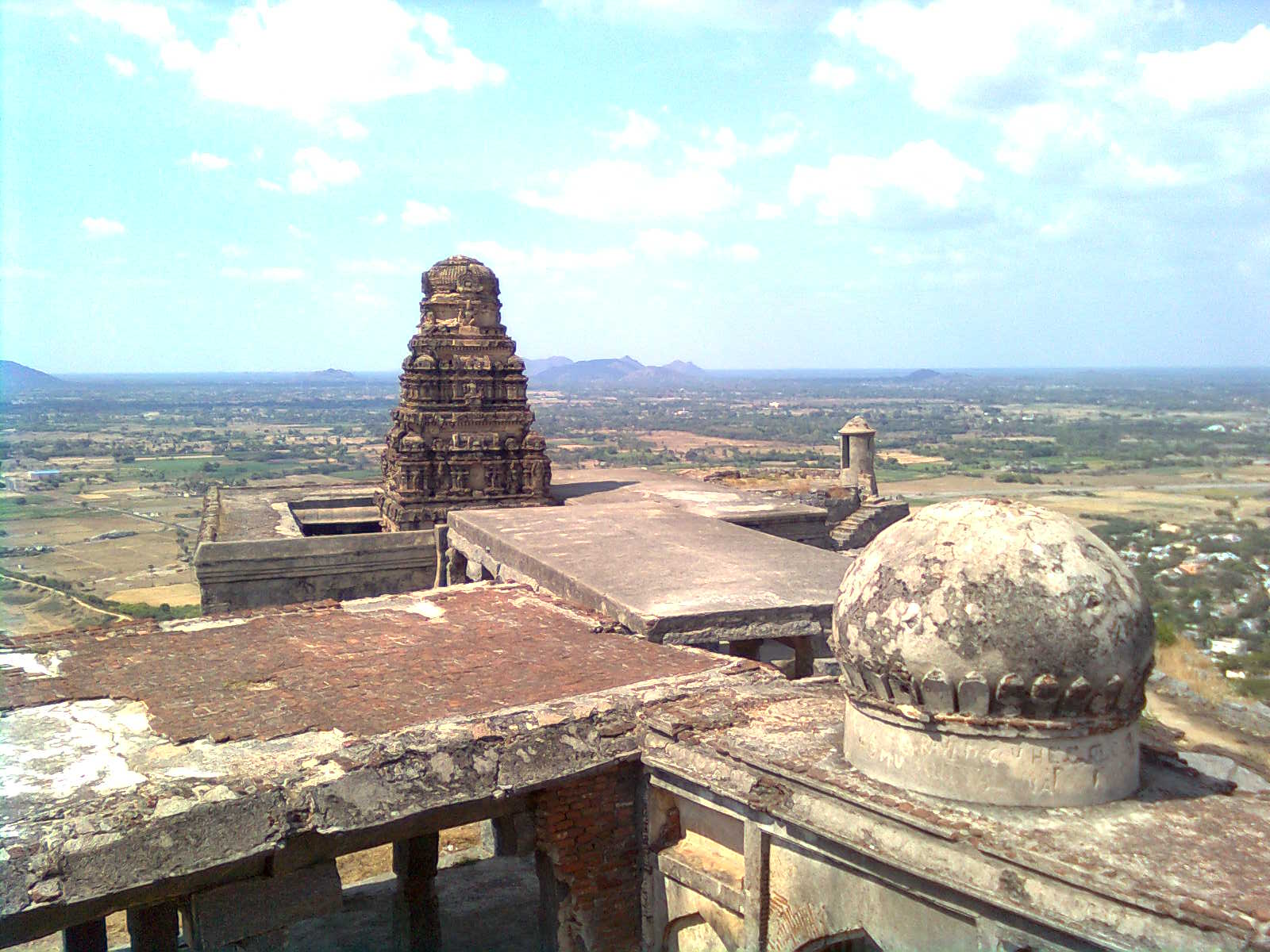
- Remains of the ancient fort on the Krishnadevaraya Hill

- Krishnagiri (Tamil Nadu)
- Coordinates: 12.5195868°N 78.2220300°E
- Country: India
- State: Tamil Nadu
- District: Krishnagiri
- Named for: Krishnadevaraya

Government
  - Type: Special Grade Municipality
  - Body: Krishnagiri Municipality
  - Member of Parliament (Lok Sabha): A. Chellakumar
  - Member of Legislative Assembly: P. Mukundhan
- Elevation: 525 m (1,722 ft)

Population (2011)
  - Total: 71,323

Languages
  - Official: Tamil
- Time zone: UTC+5:30 (IST)
- PIN: 635001,635002,635115,635101,635120
- Telephone code: 4343
- Vehicle registration: TN-24
- Website: www.krishnagiri.tn.nic.in

Krishnagiri (IPA: [kiɾɯʂɳaɡiɾi]) is a city in the state of Tamil Nadu, India, and it serves as the administrative headquarters of Krishnagiri District formed in 2004. It is located at the bottom of Krishnadevaraya Hills, and the city is fully surrounded by hill rocks. It is located 250 km from Chennai, 45 km from Dharmapuri, and 90 km from Bengaluru. Krishnagiri is known as "Mango Capital of India" as mangoes are cultivated as the main crop, and the land here is extremely fertile with rich access to fresh water making it amenable to growing crops. Krishnagiri is the site of significant business and residential development. The Krishnagiri Dam was built in 1967.

== History ==
=== Prehistoric ===
The Krishnagiri district has a prehistoric importance. Archeological sources confirm human habitation during Paleolithic, Neolithic and Mesolithic Ages. Various rock paintings and rock carvings of Indus Valley civilization and Iron Age seen in this district support the historical significance of this district.

=== Classical and modern history ===
Krishnagiri region is a part of the ancient Kongu Nadu and Chera country. Historically it was ruled by Chera rulers. Later the region came under Cholas, Pallavas, Gangas, Nulambas, Hoysalas, Vijaya Nagar and Bijapur emperors, Wodeyars of Mysore and Nayaks of Madurai. This region of Krishnagiri served as "Gateway of Tamil Nadu" and the protective barrier for the southern region defending onslaughts from invaders with motives of imperialism and exploitation. Krishnagiri Fort become the first and foremost defensive place. The majestic fortress, built on Krishnagiri hill by the Vijaya Nagar emperors, stands as testimony still now.

During Mysore war I, the British troops passed through Krishnagiri to attack Hyder Ali's Forces at Kaveripattinam. British army was defeated here. In Mysore war II after the "Treaty of Srirangapattinam" entire region of Salem and Barah Mahal were surrendered to the British. In 1792 CE, Captain Alexander Reed became the first District Collector of this region. Under the diplomacy of Robert Clive, the then Governor of Madras Presidency, Krishnagiri became the headquarters of Bara Mahal.

A mint was established at Krishnagiri in 1794 CE. Gold, silver and copper coins were forged here. Many soldiers from Krishnagiri region took part in the world war and were killed. The historical importance and potential growth in education, economy and tourism of present Krishnagiri made it necessary to create a separate district. Krishnagiri was formed as 30th district by the Government of Tamil Nadu. Krishnagiri district was carved out of Dharmapuri district on 9 February 2004 with five taluks and ten blocks.

== Climate ==
Krishnagiri experiences a borderline hot semi-arid climate (Köppen BSh)/tropical savanna climate (Aw). The temperature here averages 26.5 °C or 79.7 °F and annual rainfall averages 794 millimetres or 31.3 inches. There are three distinct seasons that can be seen in Krishnagiri. Monsoon season brings substantial amount of rainfall in short intervals to this region – Krishnagiri experiences a long though not intense monsoon. Winters are generally very warm but dry, although the morning temperature can fall to 13 °C or 55.4 °F, and clearly the best time to visit. Summer is from the months of March to June. During this time temperatures are hot to sweltering and mercury rise up to around 38 °C or 100.4 °F and dipping a minimum of 32 °C or 89.6 °F. April and May are generally the hottest months of the year and the heat could be uncomfortable.

Climate data for Krishnagiri
| Month | Jan | Feb | Mar | Apr | May | Jun | Jul | Aug | Sep | Oct | Nov | Dec | Year |
|---|---|---|---|---|---|---|---|---|---|---|---|---|---|
| Mean daily maximum °C (°F) | 29.2 (84.6) | 31.6 (88.9) | 33.4 (92.1) | 35.9 (96.6) | 36.1 (97.0) | 34.8 (94.6) | 32.0 (89.6) | 31.6 (88.9) | 31.5 (88.7) | 30.4 (86.7) | 28.8 (83.8) | 28.0 (82.4) | 31.9 (89.5) |
| Mean daily minimum °C (°F) | 17.3 (63.1) | 18.0 (64.4) | 20.7 (69.3) | 23.5 (74.3) | 24.5 (76.1) | 23.3 (73.9) | 22.5 (72.5) | 21.5 (70.7) | 22.4 (72.3) | 21.5 (70.7) | 19.6 (67.3) | 17.5 (63.5) | 21.0 (69.8) |
| Average rainfall mm (inches) | 7 (0.3) | 4 (0.2) | 11 (0.4) | 32 (1.3) | 95 (3.7) | 41 (1.6) | 72 (2.8) | 90 (3.5) | 112 (4.4) | 189 (7.4) | 80 (3.1) | 61 (2.4) | 794 (31.1) |
Source: en.climate-data.org,

== Demographics ==
Historical population
| Year | Pop. | ±% |
|---|---|---|
| 1941 | 15,311 | — |
| 1951 | 19,774 | +29.1% |
| 1961 | 23,827 | +20.5% |
| 1971 | 35,263 | +48.0% |
| 1981 | 48,335 | +37.1% |
| 1991 | 60,381 | +24.9% |
| 2001 | 109,461 | +81.3% |
| 2011 | 199,657 | +82.4% |

Religious census
| Religion | Percent(%) |
| Hindu | 71.37% |
| Muslim | 24.7% |
| Christian | 3.77% |
| Jain | 0.07% |
| Sikh | 0.05% |
| Other | 0.04% |

According to 2011 census, Krishnagiri had a population of 199,657 with a sex-ratio of 1,015 females for every 1,000 males, much above the national average of 929. A total of 7,748 were under the age of six, constituting 4,059 males and 3,689 females. Scheduled Castes and Scheduled Tribes accounted for 10.64% and .18% of the population respectively. The average literacy of the town was 76.79%, compared to the national average of 72.99%. The town had a total of 16386 households. There were a total of 24,559 workers, comprising 187 cultivators, 99 main agricultural labourers, 640 in house hold industries, 22,230 other workers, 1,403 marginal workers, 10 marginal cultivators, 42 marginal agricultural labourers, 207 marginal workers in household industries and 1,144 other marginal workers.

As per the religious census of 2011, Krishnagiri (M) had 71.37% Hindus, 24.7% Muslims, 3.77% Christians, 0.05% Sikhs, 0.07% Jains, 0.03% following other religions and 0.01% following no religion or did not indicate any religious preference.

Tamil is the major language spoken in Krishnagiri. Telugu and Kannada are also spoken here, due to the proximity towards Andhra Pradesh and Karnataka states.

== Economy ==
The major crop of Krishnagiri district with 300.17 km^{2} area of cultivation is mango. The district produces 300,000 tones annually and in Tamil Nadu Krishnagiri District is the leading mango producer. Almost 20% of the mango varieties like 'Thothapuri' and 'Alphonso' that are produced in this district, are processed into pulp. In addition to mango pulp processing, tonnes of mangoes are processed into juice every year in this district. A large-scale mango export zone has been approved for the Krishnagiri district. This will allow growing as well as processing of mangoes thus yielding higher profits for the farmers.

Approximately 25 industries located in this district process mangoes. Much of the population in this district is employed through mango cultivation directly and other labour class benefit through employment in mango processing units. There are about 150 mango nurseries which produce mango saplings in and around 'Santhur Village'. The district exports mango-based products worth over ₹ 8 billion. Under the horticulture development program, government owned horticulture farms are functioning here. Through these units, about 300,000 fruit saplings are produced and distributed under different schemes. Apart from production and export, Krishnagiri also hosts Mango exhibition every year which is the unique in its kind in line with the annual exhibition held at New Delhi.

Krishnagiri is an urbanized city well connected between AP, Karnataka and Tamil Nadu by NH7 (National Highway 7). Arcot Makkan Peda is a traditional sweet. There are shopping malls. There are a boat club and a park on the city's outskirts.

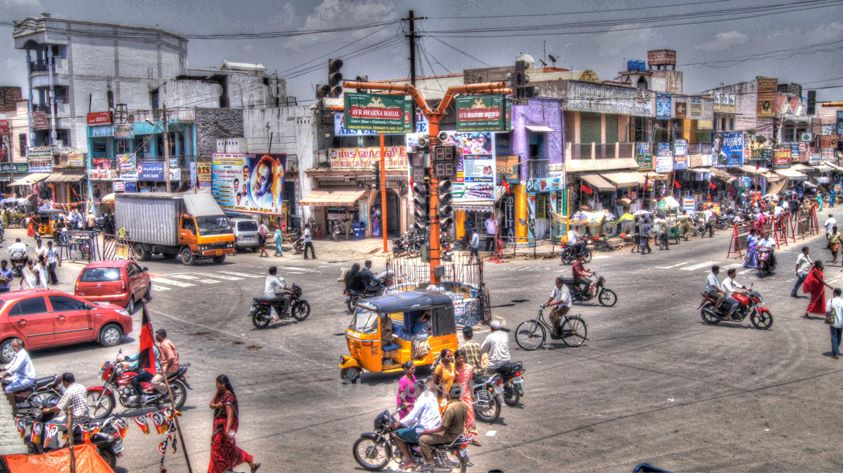
Krishnagiri traffic circle

== Transport ==
Krishnagiri is well connected to various parts of India through several National Highways that include Krishnagiri–Chennai NH 48, Tindivanam–Krishnagiri NH 77, Krishnagiri–Madanapalli NH 42 and Srinagar–Kanyakumari via Krishnagiri NH 44.

Krishnagiri connects 3 different states i.e. Tamil Nadu, Karnataka and Andhra Pradesh.

The National Highway from Hosur to Krishnagiri is currently undergoing expansion from four-lanes to six-lanes.

The new bus stand on the outskirts of the town is well connected by government buses and private carriers to Chennai, Bengaluru, Coimbatore and other major cities and towns in Tamil Nadu, Karnataka, Andhra Pradesh, Kerala and Puducherry.

The nearest railway stations are Dharmapuri (45 km), Kuppam, Andhra Pradesh (35 km), Jolarpet (60 km), and Rayakotta (30 km). A proposal is before the central government -via Jolarpet-Hosur route to build a Railway station in Krishnagiri thus making it part of the Indian railway network. This is set to facilitate trade of textiles and fruits. As per new budget report, the proposed new line would take off from Jolarpet Junction, Tirupattur and pass through Kandili, Bargur, Krishnagiri and Shoolagiri a length of 104 km to join at Rayakottai. Another survey was conducted for a new rail link between Krishnagiri and Dharmapuri in 2004–05.

The nearest commercial airport is Bengaluru International Airport (91 km) and Salem Airport (110 km).

== Tourism ==
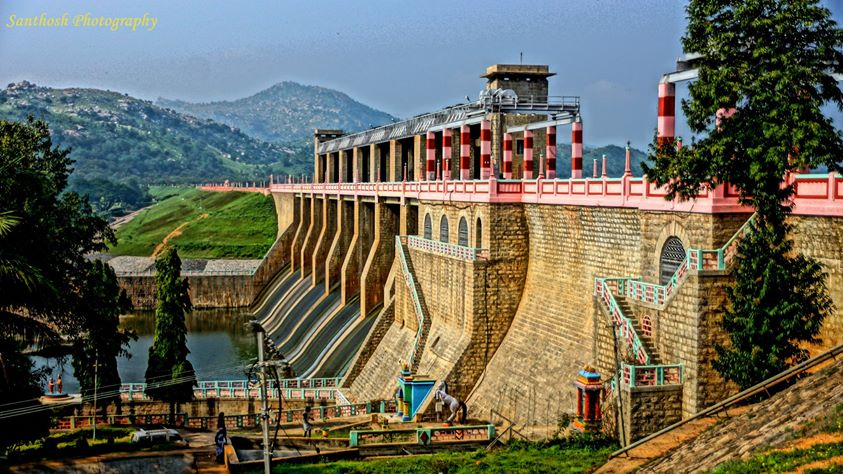
Krishangiri Dam Outside

Most visitors come from Hosur, Bangalore, Dharmapuri, Vaniyambadi, Ambur and Chennai. The Krishnagiri Dam (Krishnagiri Reservoir Project Dam) was constructed in 1958 during the rule of the then Chief Minister Kamarajar and is near the town. Nearby, Krishnagiri hill has the fortress of the ruler, Krishnadevarayar. It is possible to treks to nearby hills and mountains as well as farm houses. The boat house is 8 km from the central bus stand, which also houses a children's park. There is a variety of ancient temples in the vicinity of Krishnagiri. Nearby Ramapuram is the site of a 500-year-old Rama Temple that draws many visitors.

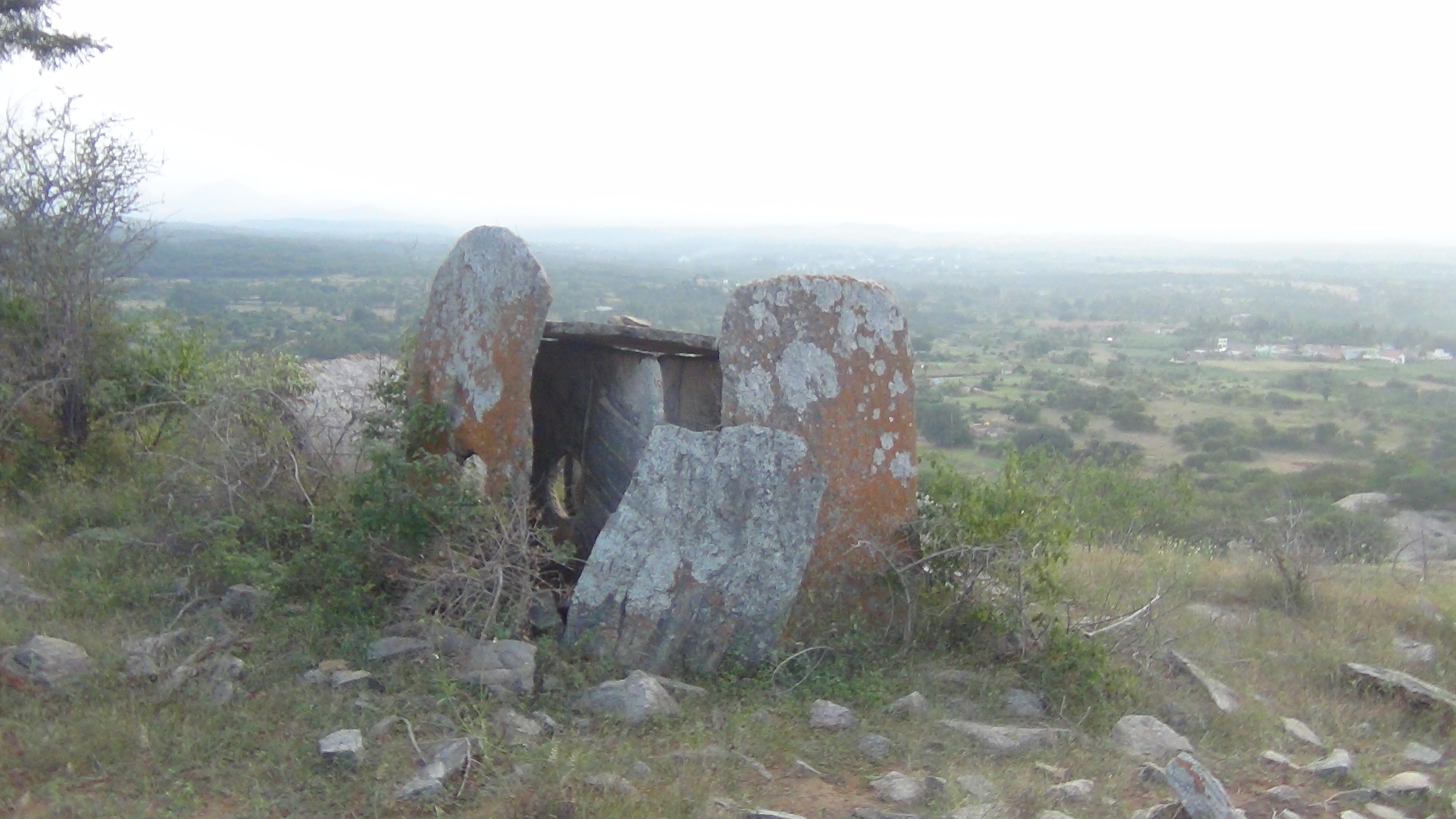
Megalith structure, Mallachandram village, near Krishnagiri

The museum in this District is known for traditional culture, art and architecture, heritage and historical background is a blessing in disguise, to spread the traditional and heritage, culture and art of Tamil Nadu and Krishnagiri District in particular. This museum has operated since 1993 AD, and is on Gandhi Salai in Krishnagiri. Historical monuments are preserved and exhibited here. It is not only a place of tourism but also a center of education. This museum collects the monuments, classifies and preserves them to conduct research on their historical worthiness. The Krishnagiri Mountain is famous for its well preserved fortress of Vijayanagar emperors, which later came under the rule of British empire.

== Politics ==
In the Tamil Nadu Legislature, Krishnagiri state assembly constituency is a part of Krishnagiri Lok Sabha constituency. In the 2026 Tamil Nadu Legislative Assembly election, the assembly seat was won by, P. Mukundhan of Tamilaga Vettri Kazhagam (TVK).

In the Parliament of India, the Krishnagiri Lok Sabha Constituency is held by politician A. Chellakumar.
