= Krishnagiri district =

District in Tamil Nadu, India

- District of Tamil Nadu
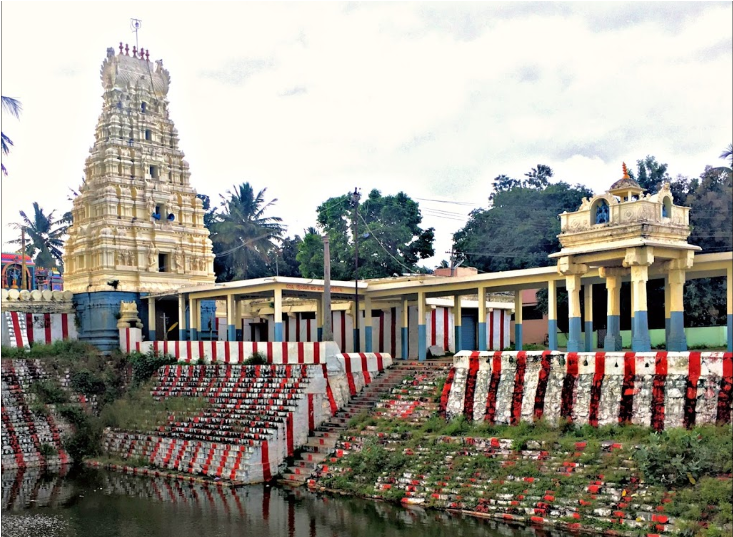
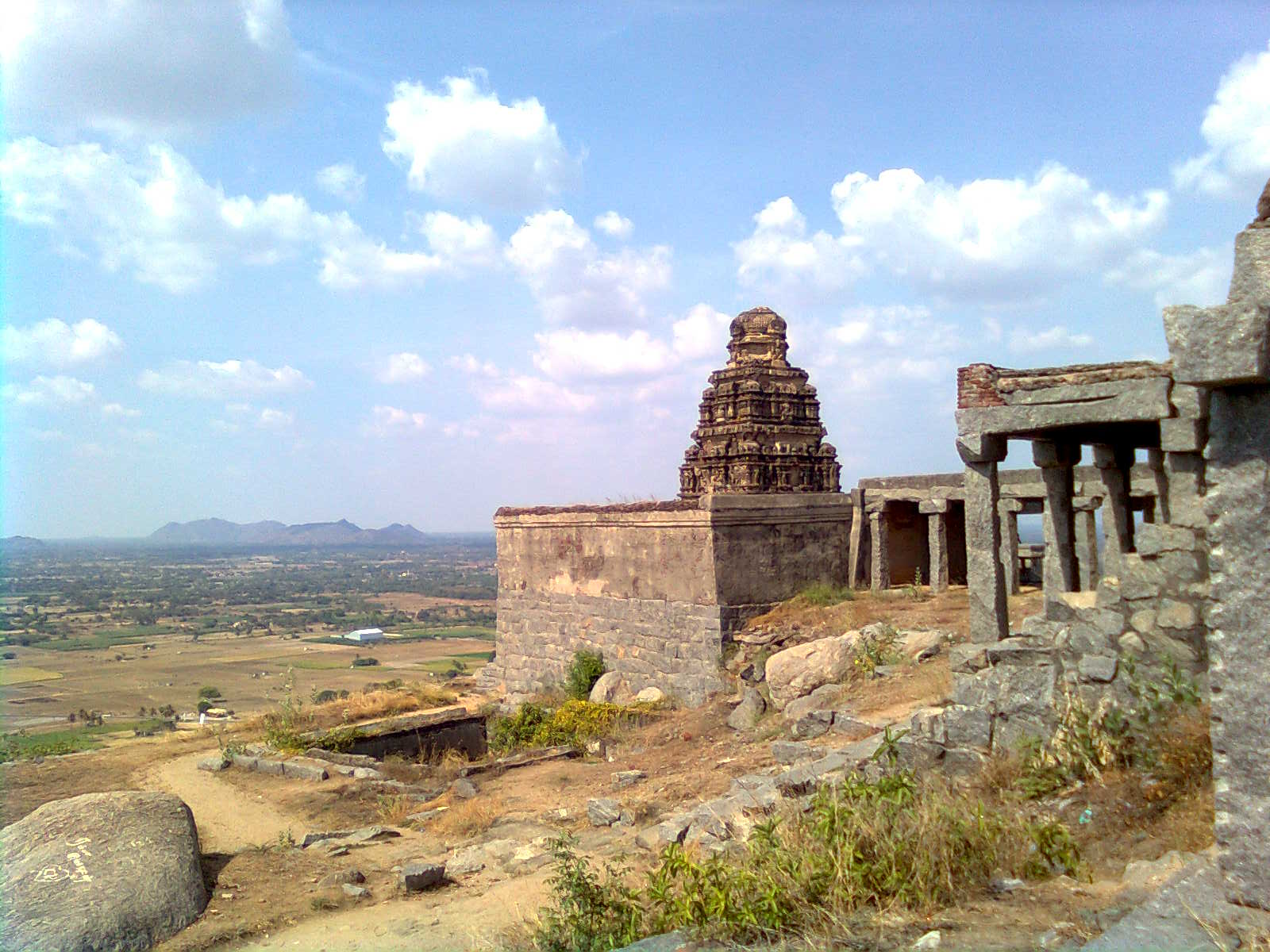
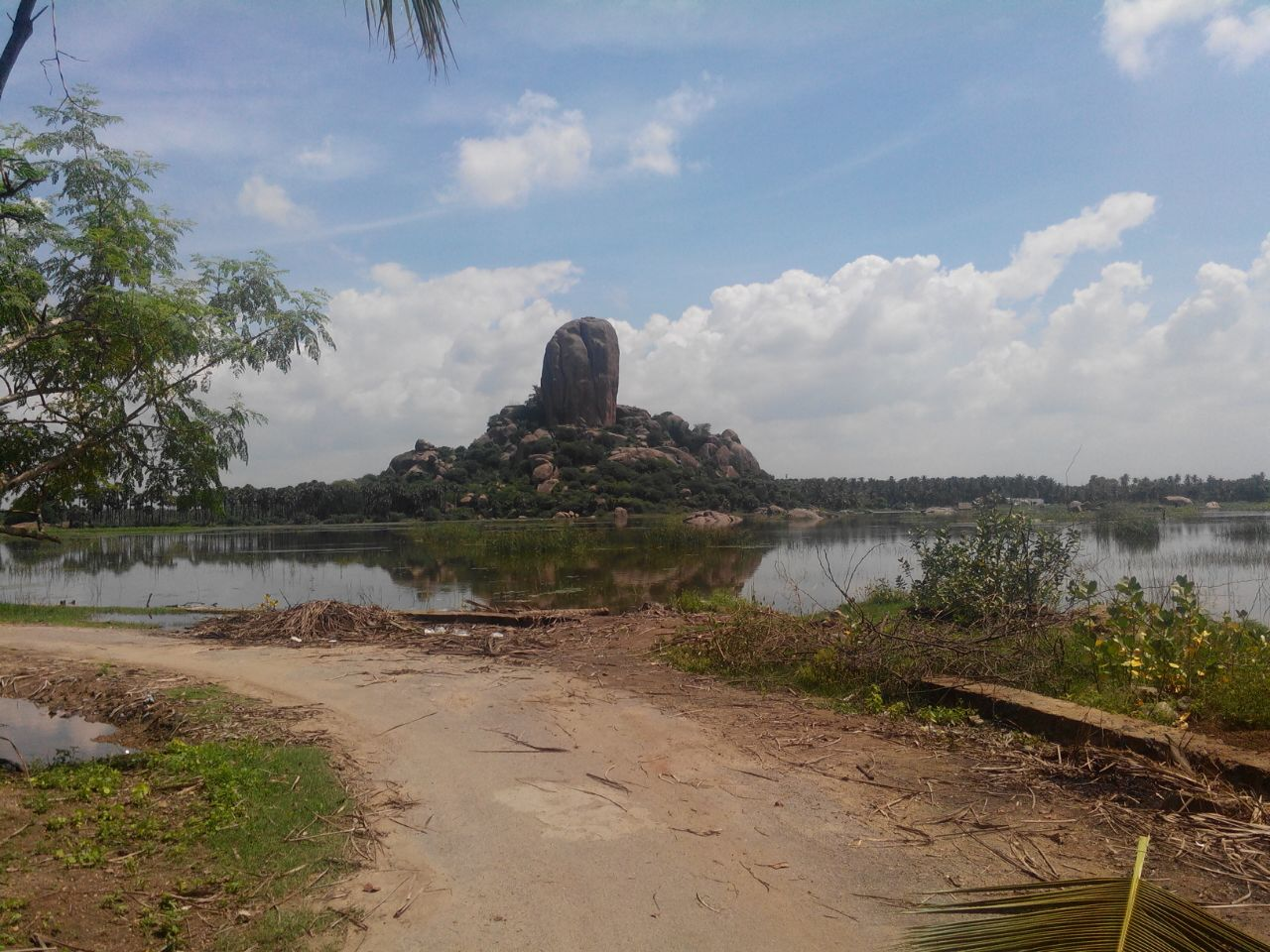
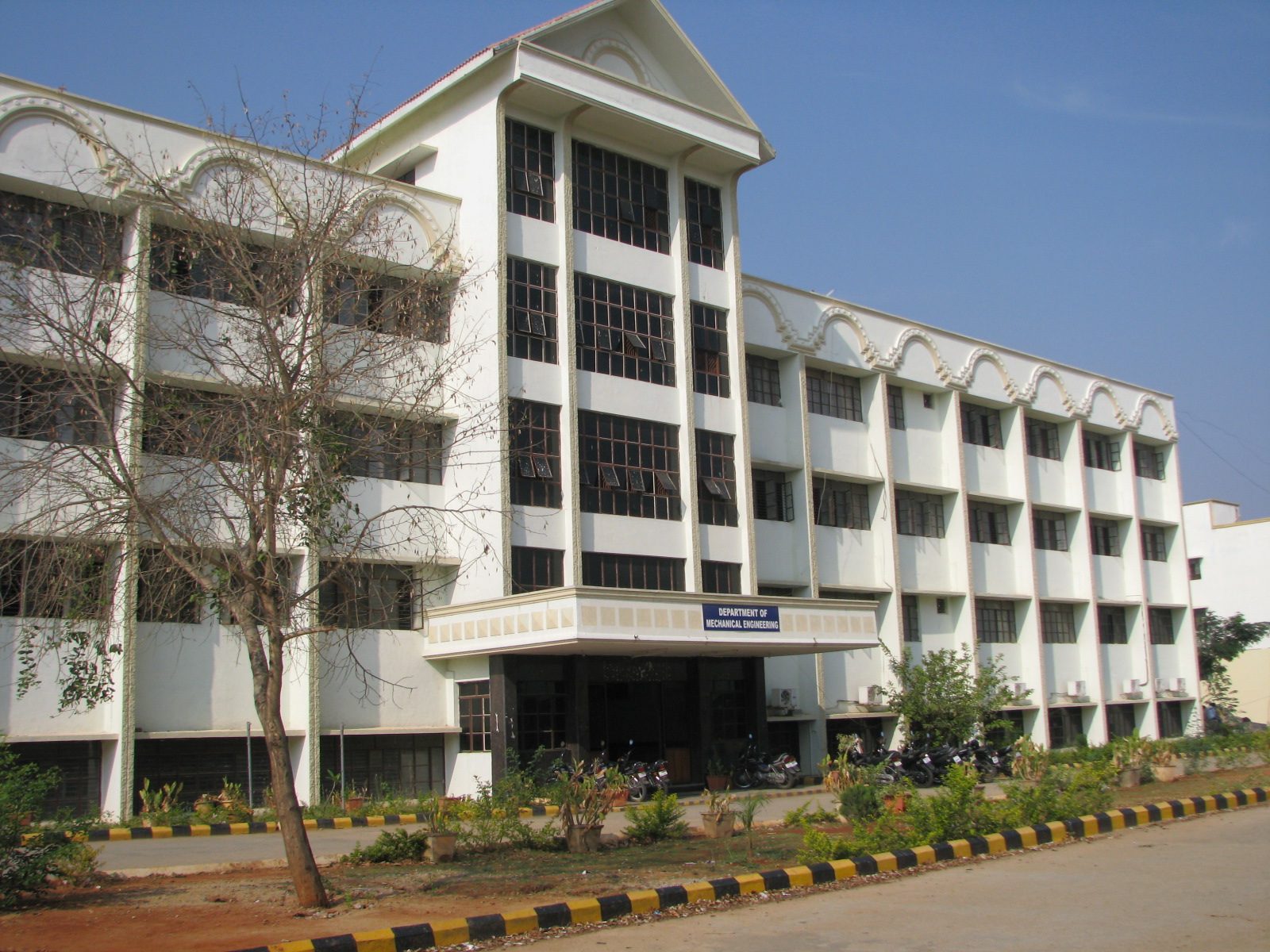
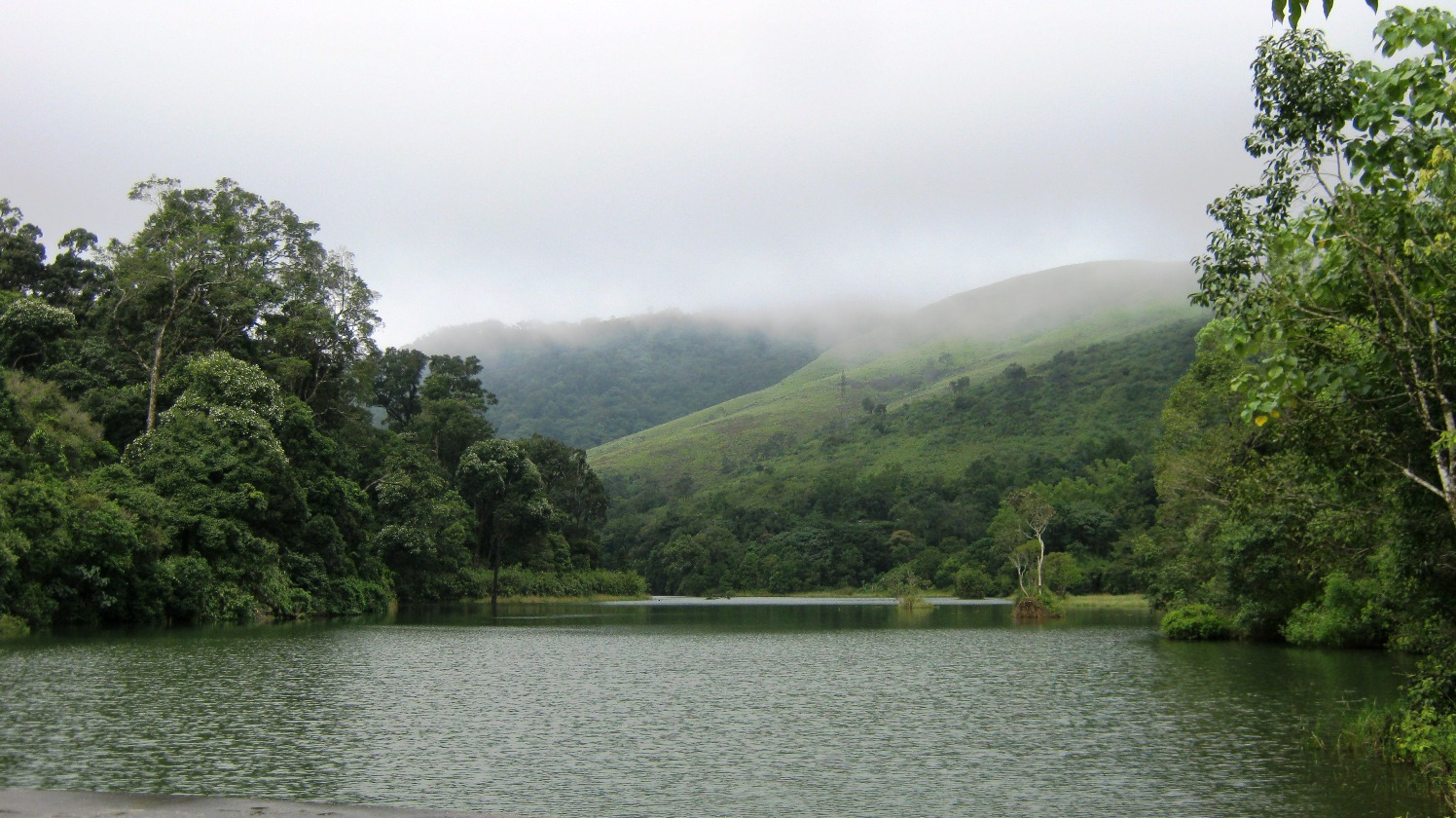
- Betrayswamy Perumal Temple, Denkanikottai, Adhiyamaan College of Engineering, Rock formation in Nedungal town
- Interactive map of Krishnagiri district
- Coordinates: 12.55157°N 78.19759°E
- Country: India
- State: Tamil Nadu
- Established: 9 February 2004
- Founder: J. Jayalalithaa
- Headquarters: Krishnagiri
- Talukas: Krishnagiri, Hosur, Denkanikottai, Shoolagiri, Pochampalli, Uthangarai, Bargur, Anchetty, Thally

Government
  - District Collector: K. M. Sarayu IAS

Population (2011)
  - Total: 1,879,809

Languages
  - Official: Tamil
  - Minority: Telugu, Kannada, Urdu
- Time zone: UTC+5:30 (IST)
- PIN: 635001
- Telephone code: 04343
- ISO 3166 code: ISO 3166-2:IN
- Vehicle registration: TN 24, TN 70
- Website: krishnagiri.nic.in

Krishnagiri district is one of the 38 districts (a district in the northwestern part) of the state of Tamil Nadu, in India. This district was carved out from Dharmapuri District in 2004. The municipal town of Krishnagiri is the district headquarters. In Tamil Nadu, e-Governance was first introduced at Krishnagiri district under the National e-Governance Project (NEGP) in revenue and social welfare departments on a pilot basis. The district is one of the largest producers of mangoes in India. As of 2011, the district had a population of 1,879,809 with a sex-ratio of 958 females for every 1,000 males. Hosur is the most populous city in the district.

== History ==
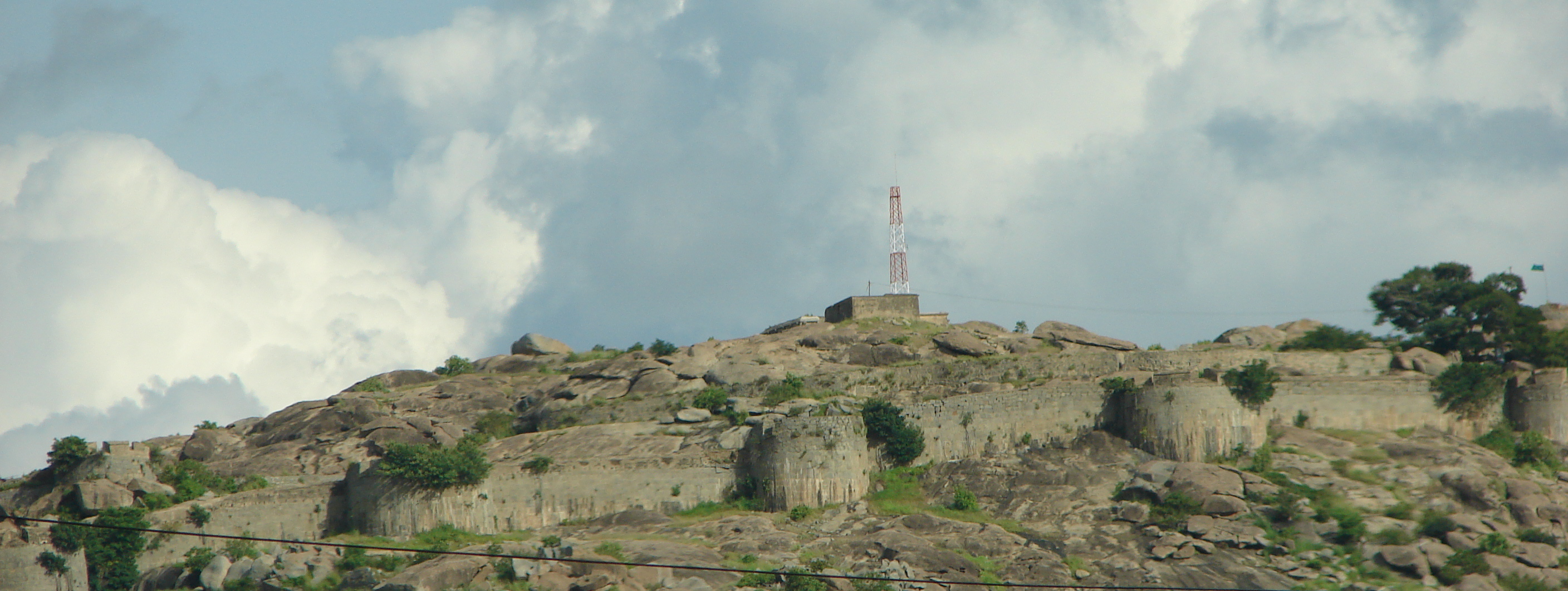
Krishnagiri Fort

Krishnagiri district was formed as the 30th district of Tamil Nadu on 9 February 2004. It was formed by carving out five taluks and ten blocks of the erstwhile Dharmapuri district. The first collector of Krishnagiri was Mangat Ram Sharma.

=== Dolmens ===
Moral Pari near Mallachandram has more than 100 dolmens. The site is located 19 km (12 mi) from Krishnagiri.

== Politics ==
District	No.	Constituency	Name	Party	Alliance	Remarks
Krishnagiri	51	Uthangarai (SC)	N. Elaiyaraja	TVK	TVK+	
Krishnagiri	52	Bargur	E. C. Govindarasan	AIADMK	AIADMK+	Opposed TVK
Krishnagiri	53	Krishnagiri	P. Mukundhan	TVK	TVK+	
Krishnagiri	54	Veppanahalli	P. S. Srinivasan	DMK	SPA	
Krishnagiri	55	Hosur	P. Balakrishna Reddy	AIADMK	AIADMK+	Supported TVK; Later declared support for EPS
Krishnagiri	56	Thalli	T. Ramachandran	CPI	LDF	Won as SPA candidate; party switched to TVK+ post-election; Outside support to TVK government

== District administration ==
A district collector heads the district administration. Krishnagiri district is divided into two divisions and eight taluks for the purpose of revenue administration. A Revenue Divisional Officer heads each division and a Tahsildars are in charge of taluk level administration. Development administration in this district is coordinated by panchayats (or blocks) in rural areas. There are about ten panchayat unions, seven town panchayats, 352 village Panchayats and 874 revenue villages in this district. The two revenue divisions are Krishnagiri and Hosur.

=== Administrative divisions ===
Municipal Corporations:

1. Hosur

Municipality:

1. Krishnagiri

Town Panchayats:

1. Uthangarai
2. Kaveripattinam
3. Kelamangalam
4. Bargur
5. Denkanikottai
6. Nagojanahalli
7. Bagalur
8. Rayakottai
9. Shoolagiri

Proposed Municipal Corporations:

1. Krishnagiri

Proposed Municipality:

1. Uthangarai
2. Kaveripattinam
3. Denkanikottai

Proposed Town Panchayats:

1. Pochampalli, Tamil Nadu
2. Samalpatti
3. Singarapettai
4. Thally

Panchayat Unions

Kelamangalam, Thalli, Krishnagiri, Shoolagiri, Veppanapalli, Hosur, Kaveripattinam, Pochampalli, Mathur, and Uthangarai

Revenue divisions:

Krishnagiri and Hosur.

Revenue taluks:

Krishnagiri, Hosur, Pochampalli, Uthangarai, Shoolagiri, Bargur and Anchetti Denkanikottai

=== Villages ===
- Athimugam
- Govinda Agraharam

== Geography and climate ==
Krishnagiri district covers an area of 5143 km^{2}. Krishnagiri district is bound by Tirupattur to the southeast, Thiruvannamalai districts to the east, Dharmapuri district to the south and Kolar, Bengaluru North (Doddaballapura), Bengaluru Urban, Bengaluru South (Ramanagara) and Chamarajanagar districts of the state of Karnataka to the northwest and west and Chittoor district of the state Andhra Pradesh to the north. This district is elevated from 300 m to 1400 m above the mean sea level. It is located between 11° 12' N and 12° 49' N latitude, 77° 27' E to 78° 38' E longitude.

Taluk HQ	Latitude (N)	Longitude (E)
Krishnagiri Taluk	12^{o}32’44"	78^{o}13’36"
Pochampalli Taluk	12^{o}20’	78^{o}22’
Uthangarai Taluk	12^{o}15’	78^{o}33’
Hosur Taluk	12^{o}48’	77^{o}50’23"
Denkanikottai Taluk	12^{o}02’	77^{o}47’
Bargur Taluk	12^{o}55’	78^{o}37’

It basically has a mountainous terrain. The flatlands are irrigated by the South Pennar River. The eastern part of the district experiences a hot climate and the western part contrastingly has a pleasant climate. The average rainfall is 830 mm per year. March - June is the summer season. July - November is the rainy season and during December - February winter prevails.

Year	Rainfall (in mm)
2001–2002	825.700
2002–2003	521.600
2003–2004	1075.600
2004–2005	230.620
2005–2006	1262.800

Net cultivated, irrigated, double, multiple cropped, cultivable wasteland, water land and forest

Classification	Geo.	Extent (ha)
Forest	202409	39%
Banner and uncultivable waste	24194	5%
Land put to non-agricultural uses	21466	4%
Cultivable waste	6341	1%
Permanent pastures and other grassing lands	7378	1%

== Transportation ==
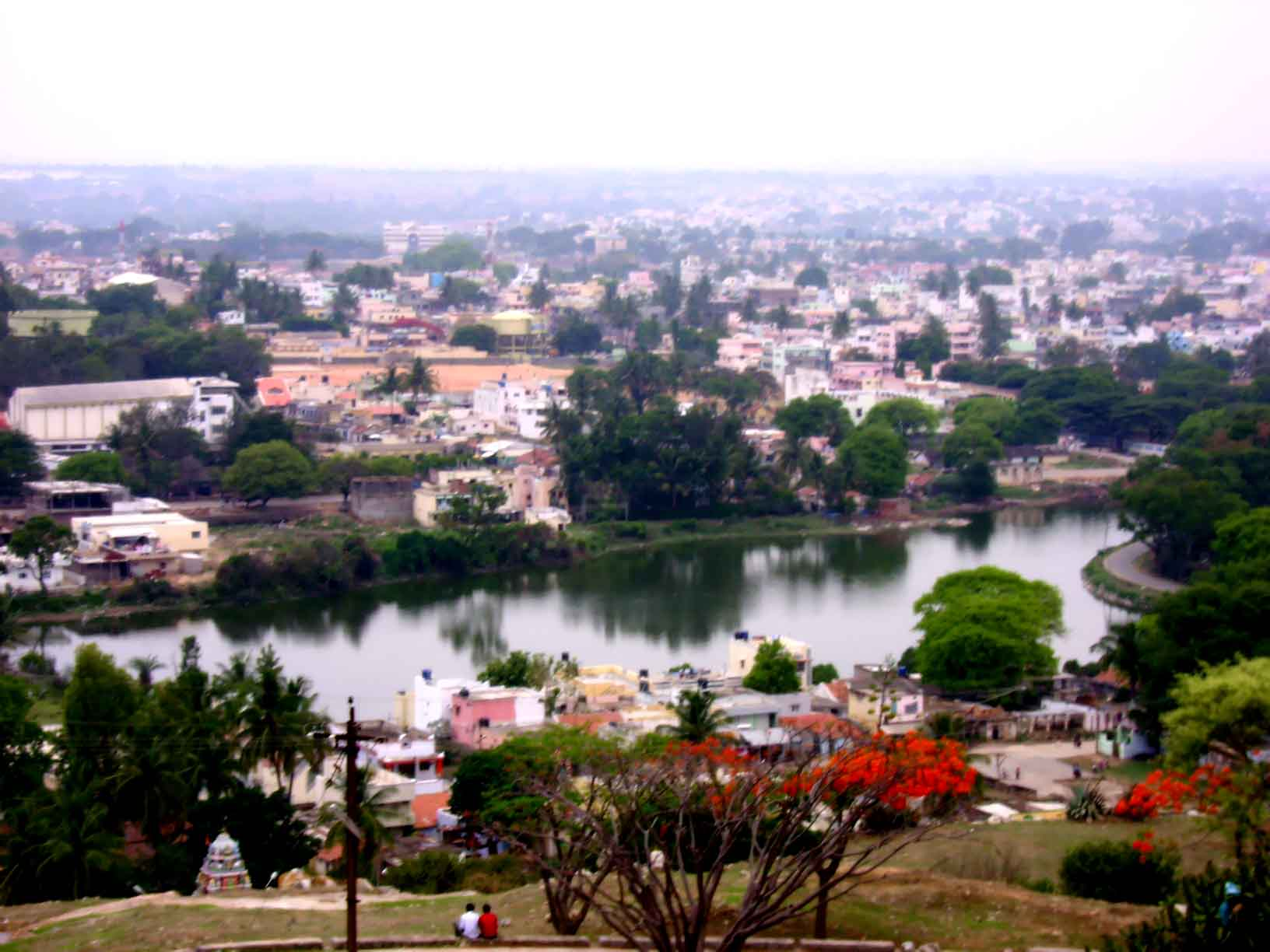
Aerial view of Hosur

The following major national highway roads pass through Krishnagiri district:--

- NH - 44: (old number: NH 7; Srinagar to Kanyakumari; passes through Hosur, Krishnagiri and Kaveripattinam)
- NH - 48: (old number: NH 46; New Delhi to Chennai; passes through Hosur, Krishnagiri and Bargur)
- NH - 42: (old number: NH 219; Krishnagiri to Palamaner; starts from Krishnagiri, passes through Varatanapalli)
- NH - 77 (connecting Krishnagiri to Tindivanam, via Mathur, Uthangarai)
- NH - 648 (old number: NH 207; Hosur to Dobbaspet, via Bagalur)
- NH - 844 (old number: SH 17, Hosur to Adhiyamaankottai)

There are state highways passing through the district.

- SH 17: Malur-Hosur-Adhiyamaan Kottai
- SH 17A: Hosur-Denkanikottai
- SH 17B: Hosur-Denkanikottai (via Thally)
- SH 17C: Bagalur-Berigai
- SH 131: Bargur-Tirupattur
- SH 85: Attibele - Rayakottai (via Hosur and kelamangalam)
- SH 60: Hogenakkal - Tirupattur (via Mathur)
- SH 514: Kuppam - Patchur - Natrampalli
- SH 433: Vepanapalli - Kuppam (via Gudupalle)

Also, several MDRs (Major District Roads) pass through this district. They are as follows:

1. MD-53 Bagalur - Berigai Road

2. MD-91 Denkanikottai - Kelamangalam Road

3. MD-124 Hosur Town to Hosur Railway Station Road

4. MD-157 Kaveripattinam - Kakkangarai Road

5. MD-192 Krishnagiri - Rayakottai Road

6. MD-193 KRP Dam approach Road

7. MD-366 Pondy - Krishnagiri Road

8. MD-422 Shoolagiri - Berigai Road

9. MD-424 Singarapet - Thirupathur Road

10. MD-456 Theertham - Berigai Road

11. MD-517 Uthangarai bypass road

12. MD-588 Denkanikottai - Anchetty - Natrampalayam Road

13. MD-660 Pondy Krishnagiri Road to Hill Round Road

14. MD-703 Thally - Jawalagiri - Karnataka State Border Road

15. MD-754 Kundarapalli - Veppanapalli Road

16. MD-861 Kaveripattinam - Palacode Road

17. MD-862 Kaveripattinam - Pochampalli Road

18. MD-863 Jandamedu - Puliyur Road

19. MD-1000 Veppanapalli - Theertham Road

20. MD-1001 Kurubarapalli - Kothakrishnapalli Road

21. MD 1186 - Perandapalli - Athimugam

=== Railways ===
Salem-Dharmapuri-Bengaluru broad gauge line runs through Hosur. Kovai-Erode-Jolarpettai broad gauge line runs through kallavi and Samalpatti.

== Public amenities ==
=== Irrigation ===
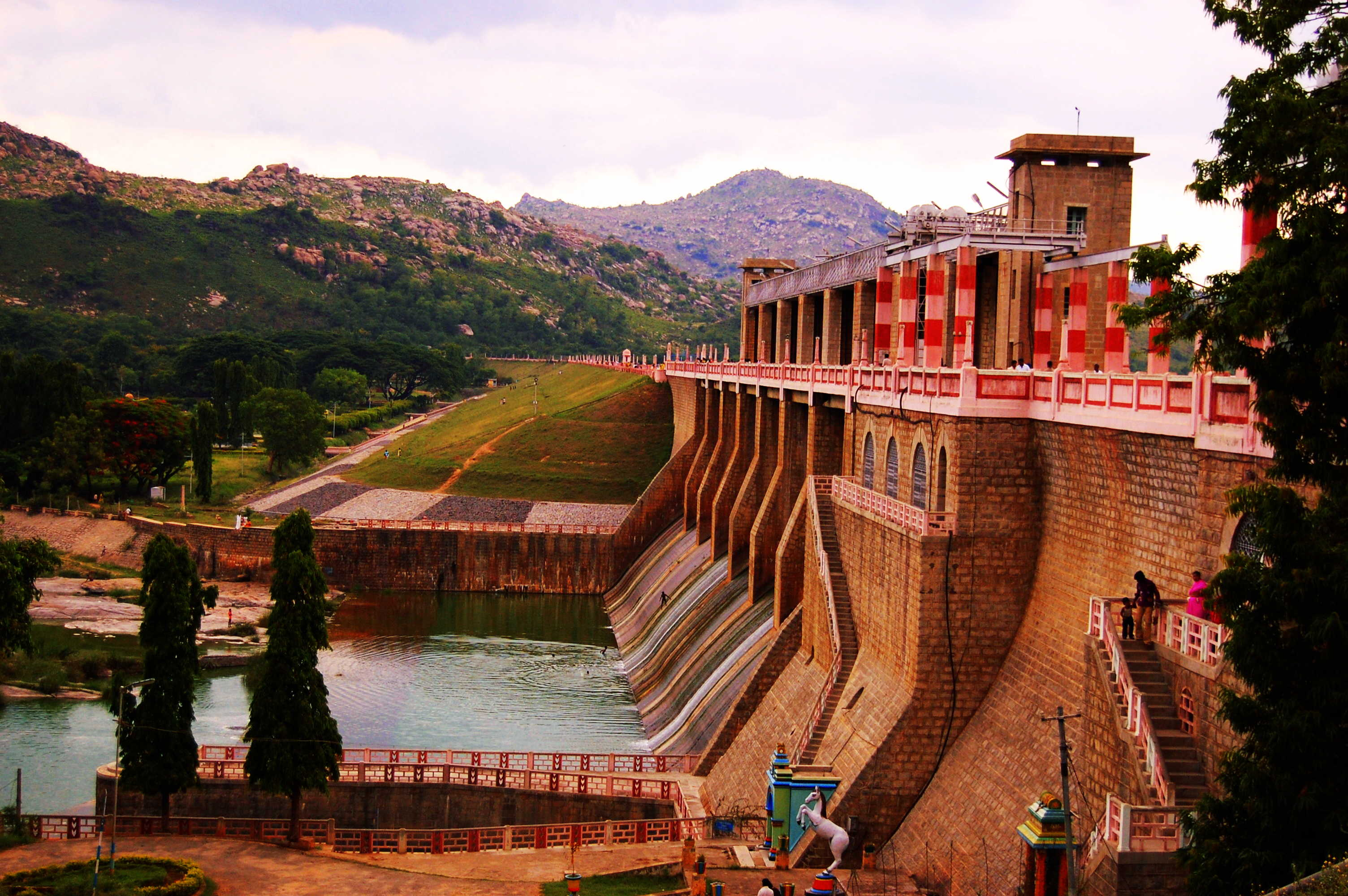
Krishnagiri Reservoir Project Dam

The Public Works Department and Panchayat union tanks, ponds and supply channels play an important role in the irrigation of Krishnagiri district. However, they have to be desilted and strengthened. New check dams and flood protection walls have to be constructed for water conservation.

=== Electricity ===
Street lighting in rural areas is vested with the Panchayat Administration. The panchayats look after the erection of new streetlights in the hamlets, payment of current consumption charges from the panchayat funds. The procurement of tube lights, sodium vapor lights and other electrical appliances is done by the connected panchayat itself. Overall, 95% of the hamlets are covered under rural electrification. Generally the power supply position in Krishnagiri District is normal. However, in some areas the low voltage problem is felt, especially in the hamlets in the ghat section. To minimize the current consumption charges in the panchayats, efforts were taken to utilize solar power lights as an alternate and renewable source in Krishnagiri district.

=== Education ===
There is a Community Polytechnic run by the Government in Krishnagiri district. Also, the TAHDCO (Tamil Nadu Adi Dravidar Housing Development Corporation) offers nursing and catering training under vocational training courses through private training institutions to people belonging to SC/ST communities. To uplift the education of women, St. James Tailoring Institute is striving for the welfare of women in Krishnagiri town. This dress making technology gives self earning at home and makes women to get jobs in ready made garment companies in Krishnagiri itself.

Education centers	No.
Primary schools	988
Middle schools	107
High schools	113
Hr. sec. schools	72
Industrial training institutions	5
Music schools	1
Teachers training schools	2
Polytechnics	8
Engineering colleges	5
Arts and science colleges	8
Computer Training Institutes	5

== Demographics ==
Historical population
Year	Pop.	±% p.a.
1901	389,745	—
1911	407,883	+0.46%
1921	389,723	−0.45%
1931	454,928	+1.56%
1941	526,107	+1.46%
1951	592,009	+1.19%
1961	716,442	+1.93%
1971	881,371	+2.09%
1981	1,056,885	+1.83%
1991	1,305,013	+2.13%
2001	1,561,118	+1.81%
2011	1,879,809	+1.88%

According to the 2011 census, Krishnagiri district had a population of 1,879,809 with a sex-ratio of 958 females for every 1,000 males, much above the national average of 929. A total of 217,323 were under the age of six, constituting 112,832 males and 104,491 females. Scheduled Castes and Scheduled Tribes accounted for 14.22% and 1.19% of the population respectively. The average literacy of the district was 63.2%, compared to the national average of 72.99%. The district had a total of 448,053 households. There were a total of 877,779 workers, comprising 218,600 cultivators, 197,369 main agricultural labourers, 15,237 in house hold industries, 310,795 other workers, 135,778 marginal workers, 17,438 marginal cultivators, 6 45,700 other marginal workers. 22.79% of the population lived in urban areas.

Religions in Krishnagiri district (2011)
Religion	Percent
Hinduism	91.70%
Islam	6.13%
Christianity	1.91%
Other or not stated	0.26%

Hinduism is the major religion and is practiced by 91.7% of the population, followed by Muslim and Christian minorities which are 6.13% and 1.91%.

Languages of Krishnagiri district (2011)
1. Tamil (58.2%)
2. Telugu (21.6%)
3. Kannada (12.7%)
4. Urdu (5.87%)
5. Others (1.64%)

At the time of the 2011 census, 58.23% of the population spoke Tamil, 21.56% Telugu, 12.70% Kannada and 5.87% Urdu as their first language.

The taluks of Krishnagiri individually too has a clear Tamil majority followed by a large minority of telugus and kannadigas.

== Economy ==
=== Agriculture ===
- The important crops of Krishnagiri District are paddy, maize, ragi, banana, sugarcane, cotton, tamarind, coconut, mango, groundnut, vegetables and flowers. The district has an excellent scope for agri-business.
- The Regional Agricultural Research Center of Tamil Nadu Agricultural University has been functioning efficiently at Paiyur in Kaveripattinam union since 1973. This center functions in 18.5 hec. of land. It helps the peasants to develop and adopt the modern technique of cultivation. It has developed hybrid seeds by research which yields more tonnage and good quality.
- Krishnagiri district is famous for mangoes, and for the granite industry with quarries and processing units spread around the district. With a 40% share, the district is the top producer of ragi in Tamil Nadu.
- Hosur, one of the most industrialized places in the state, is located in this district.

Production	Area (hectares)
Paddy	20,687
Ragii	48,944
Other minor crops	11,937
Pulses	48,749
Sugarcane	50,000
Mango	30,017
Coconut	13,192
Tamarind	1,362
Other crops	43,199

=== Mining and forestry based activities ===
- In Krishnagiri district, quarry leases are being granted for granite in Patta lands. Rough stone and earth quarry leases are being granted in government and patta lands under Tamil Nadu Minor Mineral Concession Rules 1959. The Public Works Department (WRO wing) is operating sand quarry in riverbeds. A state owned corporation called Tamil Nadu Metals and Mineral Ltd is also earning quarry and mining grants in government lands. The total mineral revenue realized during 2006-07 was Rs. 7.45 crores. It is ascertained that nearly 7,000 workers are being engaged in quarry activities.
- As Krishnagiri District has 2,02,409 hectares of forest land which constitutes 39% of the total geographical area, there are abundant produce from the forest areas. Bamboo products, honey collection and tamarind production are the forestry land activities found in Anchetty, Denkanikotta, Thally and Berigai areas. This has generated employment opportunities for thousands of rural people in these areas.

=== Animal husbandry and fisheries ===
- Fisheries

(Details about the revenue in fisheries up to 15 July 2007)

Reservoir	Target (MT)	Achievement	Revenue collection (Rs)	Fishermen benefited / amount
Krishnagiri Dam	51.0	6.810	4844	23/4844
Pambaru Dam	30	2.018	13570	16/13570
Kelavarppalli Dam	29.0	15.110	95387	30/95387
Barur Lake	284.0	17.600	124600	37/124600
Chinnaru Dam	6.8	0.931	10410	5/10410
Mayil Ravanan Lake	3.0	0.164	820	1/820
Ramanayakan Lake	4.0	0.273	2305	1/2305
Paraiyur Lake	2.0	0.216	1869	1/1260

- Animal husbandry

In Krishnagiri District the annual income in the animal husbandry sector was as follows for 2006-07.

Classification	Income received
Milk	24,94,926
Egg	3,88,192
Pork	1,54,496
Sale of livestock	4,21,578
Miscellaneous	13,55,244
Artificial insemination	5,79,898
LN 2 (liquid nitrogen)	1,27,819
Total income	55,22,153

== Notable people ==
=== Politicians ===
- K. A. Manoharan
- K. P. Munusamy
- C. R. Narasimhan
- K. Appavu Pillai
- C. Rajagopalachari
- P. Balakrishna Reddy
- N. Ramachandra Reddy
- K. Samarasam
- B. Venkataswamy

=== Writer ===
- Perumal Rasu

=== Sportsperson ===
- Ganapathi Krishnan

=== Cinema ===
- Murali G.

== Gallery ==
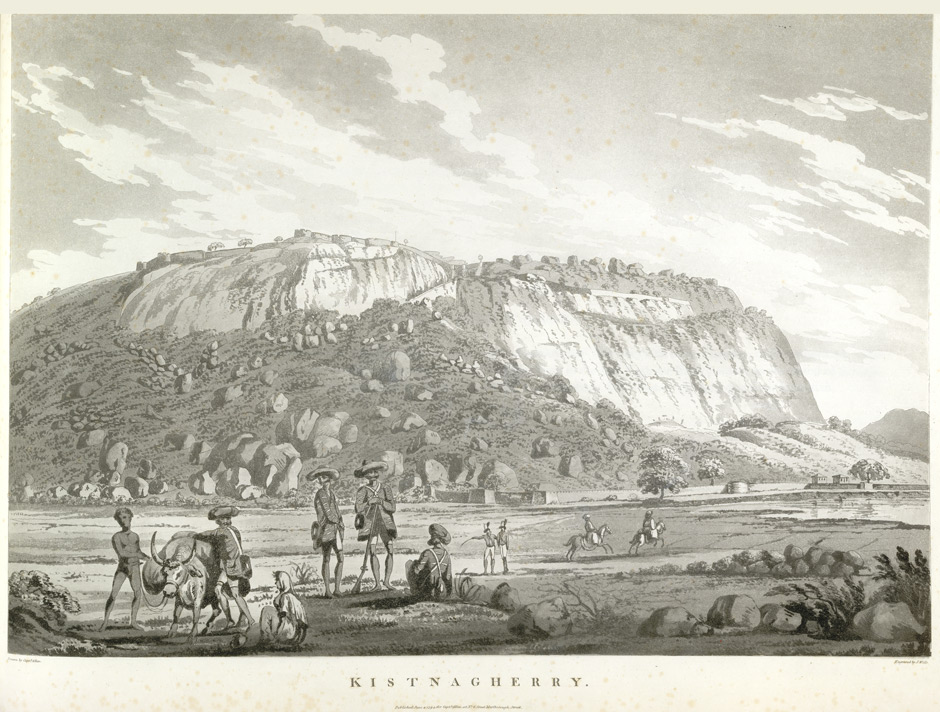
Kistnagherry fort painting by Alexander Allan

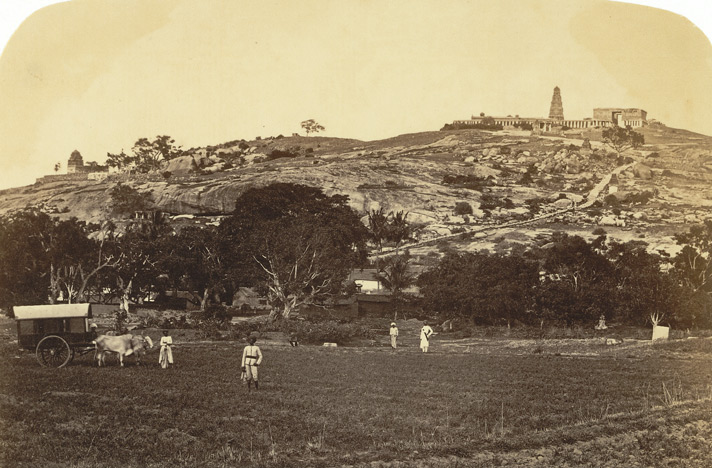
An old photo of Hosur

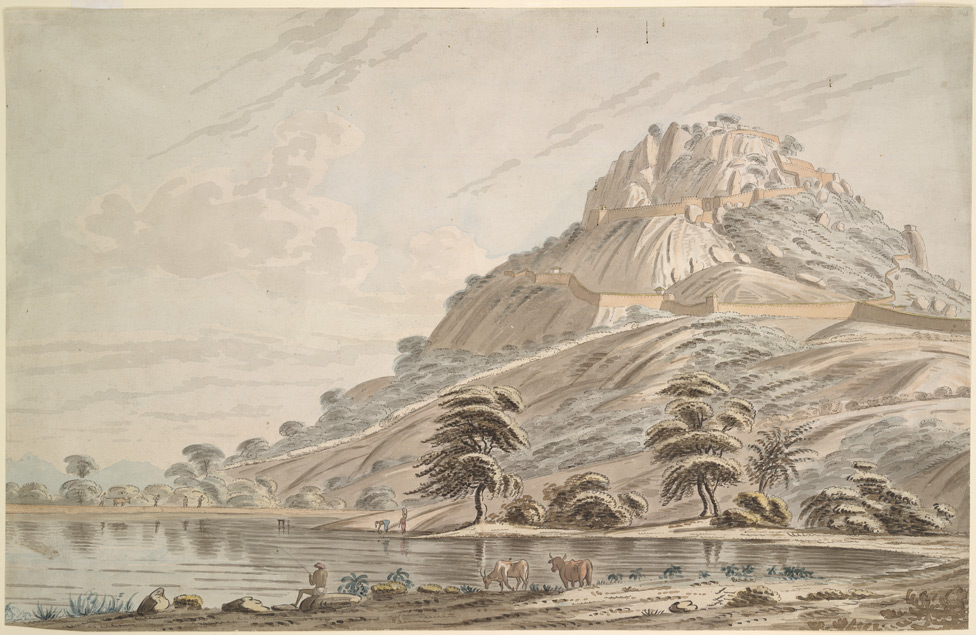
Anchettidurgam painting by Sir Alexander Allan

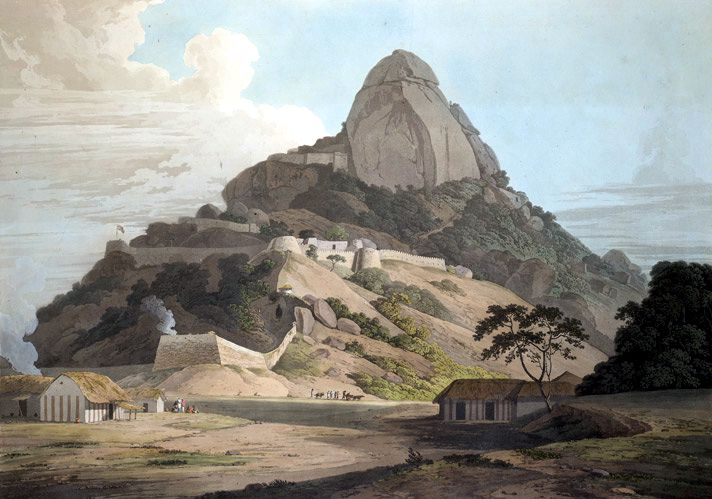
Rayakottai fort painting by Thomas Daniel

== See also ==
- Transport in Krishnagiri
- List of districts of Tamil Nadu
- Baliganur
