= K. P. Munusamy =

Indian politician

Deputy General Secretary of All India Anna Dravida Munnetra Kazhagam
- Incumbent
- Assumed office 11 July 2022 Serving with Natham R. Viswanathan
- General Secretary: Edappadi K. Palaniswami
- Preceded by: T. T. V. Dhinakaran

Deputy Co-ordinator for AIADMK
- In office 21 August 2017 – 23 June 2022 Serving with R. Vaithilingam
- Preceded by: position established
- Succeeded by: position abolished

Minister for Municipal Administration and Rural Development
- In office 16 May 2011 – 20 May 2014
- Chief Minister: J.Jayalalithaa

Member of the Tamil Nadu Legislative Assembly
- In office 12 May 2021 – 5 May 2026
- Preceded by: P. Murugan
- Succeeded by: P. S. Srinivasan
- Constituency: Veppanahalli
- In office 23 May 2011 – 21 May 2016
- Preceded by: T. Senguttuvan
- Succeeded by: T. Senguttuvan
- Constituency: Krishnagiri
- In office 13 May 2001 – 11 May 2006
- Preceded by: P. V. S. Venkatesan
- Succeeded by: T. A. Meganathan
- Constituency: Kavaripattinam
- In office 1991–1996
- Preceded by: V. C. Govindasamy
- Succeeded by: P. V. S. Venkatesan
- Constituency: Kavaripattinam

Member of Parliament
- In office 10 March 1998 – 26 April 1999
- Constituency: Krishnagiri Lok Sabha

Member of Parliament, Rajya sabha
- In office 2 April 2020 – 10 May 2021
- Constituency: Tamil Nadu

Personal details
- Born: Munusamy; 7 June 1952 (age 74) Kaveripattinam, Madras State, India
- Party: All India Anna Dravida Munnetra Kazhagam
- Spouse: Mangayarkarasi
- Children: Sathish Kumar Munusamy, Karthik Munusamy, Uma Maheshwari kannan
- Parent: Poongavanam (father)

Kaveripattinam Poongavanam Munusamy, better known as K. P. Munusamy (born 7 June 1952), is an Indian politician and deputy general secretary of AIADMK and incumbent member of the Tamil Nadu Legislative Assembly from Veppanahalli. Munusamy completed his Bachelor of Arts from Govt. Arts College, Krishnagiri during 1971–1974 and later graduated Bachelor of Law from Government Law College, Chennai. He was a Minister for Municipal Administration and Rural Development in the Government of Tamil Nadu.

Munusamy also serves as district secretary, All India Anna Dravida Munnetra Kazhagam (AIADMK) and secretary of Krishnagiri district Anna employees union.

== Political career ==
He joined the Anna Dravida Munnetra Kazhagam party in the year 1972. He rose to the position of Head of the District Youth wing in the party by 1988. He contested in the 1991 Tamil Nadu state assembly elections where he emerged successful from Kaveripattinam constituency. Later he was elected to the 12th Lok Sabha from Krishnagiri Constituency. During his tenure as Member of Parliament, he was a member in various parliamentary committees including Committee on Agriculture, Committee to review the rate of dividend payable by the Railway Undertakings to General Revenues, Consultative Committee of Ministry of Science and Technology and other Science Departments. Then he won the 2001 Tamil Nadu state assembly elections from the same Kaveripattinam constituency. In January 2011 he became the Krishnagiri District secretary for the Anna Dravida Munnetra Kazhagam party.

In the 2011 Tamil Nadu assembly elections, he was able to gain 89,776 votes against his rival Syed Ghiyas-Ul-Haq of Indian National Congress from Krishnagiri Constituency winning by a margin of 29,097 votes.

== Electoral performance ==
2021 Tamil Nadu Legislative Assembly election: Veppanahalli
| Party | Candidate | Votes | % | ±% |
|---|---|---|---|---|
| AIADMK | K. P. Munusamy | 94,104 | 45.87 | +2.57 |
| DMK | P. Murugan | 91,050 | 44.38 | −1.63 |
| NTK | M. Sakthivel | 8,310 | 4.05 | New |
| DMDK | S. M. Murugesan | 3,601 | 1.76 | −0.65 |
| Independent | Abdul Azeez Amanullah | 3,022 | 1.47 | New |
| NOTA | NOTA | 1,662 | 0.81 | +0.04 |
| Margin of victory | | 3,054 | 1.49 | −1.22 |
| Turnout | | 205,141 | 81.62 | −3.12 |
| Rejected ballots | | 322 | 0.16 | |
| Registered electors | | 251,346 | | |
| AIADMK gain from DMK | | Swing | -0.14 | |

2016 Tamil Nadu Legislative Assembly election: Pennagaram
| Party | Candidate | Votes | % | ±% |
|---|---|---|---|---|
| DMK | P. N. P. Inbasekaran | 76,848 | 38.49% | −3.71 |
| PMK | Anbumani Ramadoss | 58,402 | 29.25% | New |
| AIADMK | K. P. Munusamy | 51,687 | 25.89% | New |
| CPI | N. Nanjappan | 5,624 | 2.82% | −46.5 |
| NOTA | NOTA | 2,081 | 1.04% | New |
| Margin of victory | | 18,446 | 9.24% | 2.13% |
| Turnout | | 199,635 | 88.04% | 5.03% |
| Registered electors | | 226,746 | | |
| DMK gain from CPI | | Swing | -10.82% | |

2011 Tamil Nadu Legislative Assembly election: Krishnagiri
| Party | Candidate | Votes | % | ±% |
|---|---|---|---|---|
| AIADMK | K. P. Munusamy | 89,776 | 55.98% | +19.71 |
| INC | Syed Ghiyas Ul Haq | 60,679 | 37.83% | New |
| BJP | Kotteswaran | 3,025 | 1.89% | +1.31 |
| Ulzaipali Makkal Katchy | R. Raja. | 2,357 | 1.47% | New |
| Independent | G. Latha | 1,561 | 0.97% | New |
| Margin of victory | | 29,097 | 18.14% | 5.17% |
| Turnout | | 160,379 | 79.42% | 8.26% |
| Registered electors | | 201,926 | | |
| AIADMK gain from DMK | | Swing | 6.74% | |

2006 Tamil Nadu Legislative Assembly election: Kaveripattinam
| Party | Candidate | Votes | % | ±% |
|---|---|---|---|---|
| PMK | T. A. Meganathan | 64,878 | 45.96% | |
| AIADMK | K. P. Munusamy | 53,144 | 37.64% | −17.11% |
| DMDK | K. R. Chinnaraj | 14,892 | 10.55% | |
| Independent | V. Venkatesan | 2,509 | 1.78% | |
| Independent | T. Rajamani | 1,511 | 1.07% | |
| BSP | M. Arul Mozhi | 1,173 | 0.83% | |
| Independent | D. Kuppusamy | 1,069 | 0.76% | |
| Independent | S. Kaviarasu | 1,043 | 0.74% | |
| BJP | K. Madappan | 954 | 0.68% | |
| Margin of victory | | 11,734 | 8.31% | −6.77% |
| Turnout | | 141,173 | 77.08% | 11.72% |
| Registered electors | | 183,149 | | |
| PMK gain from AIADMK | | Swing | -8.80% | |

2001 Tamil Nadu Legislative Assembly election: Kaveripattinam
| Party | Candidate | Votes | % | ±% |
|---|---|---|---|---|
| AIADMK | K. P. Munusamy | 67,241 | 54.75% | 22.97% |
| DMK | V. C. Govindasamy Gounder | 48,724 | 39.67% | −22.84% |
| MDMK | T. Subramani | 3,785 | 3.08% | 1.73% |
| Independent | P. Jayaseelan | 3,061 | 2.49% | |
| Margin of victory | | 18,517 | 15.08% | −15.65% |
| Turnout | | 122,811 | 65.36% | −7.06% |
| Registered electors | | 187,940 | | |
| AIADMK gain from DMK | | Swing | -7.76% | |

1996 Tamil Nadu Legislative Assembly election: Kaveripattinam
| Party | Candidate | Votes | % | ±% |
|---|---|---|---|---|
| DMK | P. V. S. Venkatesan | 72,945 | 62.52% | 39.77% |
| AIADMK | K. P. Munusamy | 37,086 | 31.78% | −37.88% |
| PMK | T. A. Meganathan | 3,032 | 2.60% | |
| MDMK | V. C. Govindasamy Gounder | 1,582 | 1.36% | |
| PJP | P. Murugesan | 984 | 0.84% | |
| Independent | T. Ravi | 430 | 0.37% | |
| Independent | T. P. Gnanasekaran | 274 | 0.23% | |
| Independent | T. Thotlan | 195 | 0.17% | |
| Independent | G. Ramachandran | 153 | 0.13% | |
| Margin of victory | | 35,859 | 30.73% | −16.19% |
| Turnout | | 116,681 | 72.42% | 3.48% |
| Registered electors | | 171,738 | | |
| DMK gain from AIADMK | | Swing | -7.15% | |

1991 Tamil Nadu Legislative Assembly election: Kaveripattinam
| Party | Candidate | Votes | % | ±% |
|---|---|---|---|---|
| AIADMK | K. P. Munusamy | 70,136 | 69.67% | 36.43% |
| DMK | V. C. Govindasamy Gounder | 22,900 | 22.75% | −14.42% |
| PMK | N. Gounder Thatha | 6,084 | 6.04% | |
| Independent | C. Nagarajan | 651 | 0.65% | |
| BJP | J. P. Krishnan | 533 | 0.53% | |
| Independent | R. Sankar | 259 | 0.26% | |
| Independent | P. M. Ranganathan | 112 | 0.11% | |
| Margin of victory | | 47,236 | 46.92% | 42.98% |
| Turnout | | 100,675 | 68.94% | −6.22% |
| Registered electors | | 154,730 | | |
| AIADMK gain from DMK | | Swing | 32.50% | |
