= Krishnagiri Lok Sabha constituency =

Parliamentary constituency in Tamil Nadu, India

Coordinates: 12.51669°N 78.22463°E

Krishnagiri
- Lok Sabha constituency
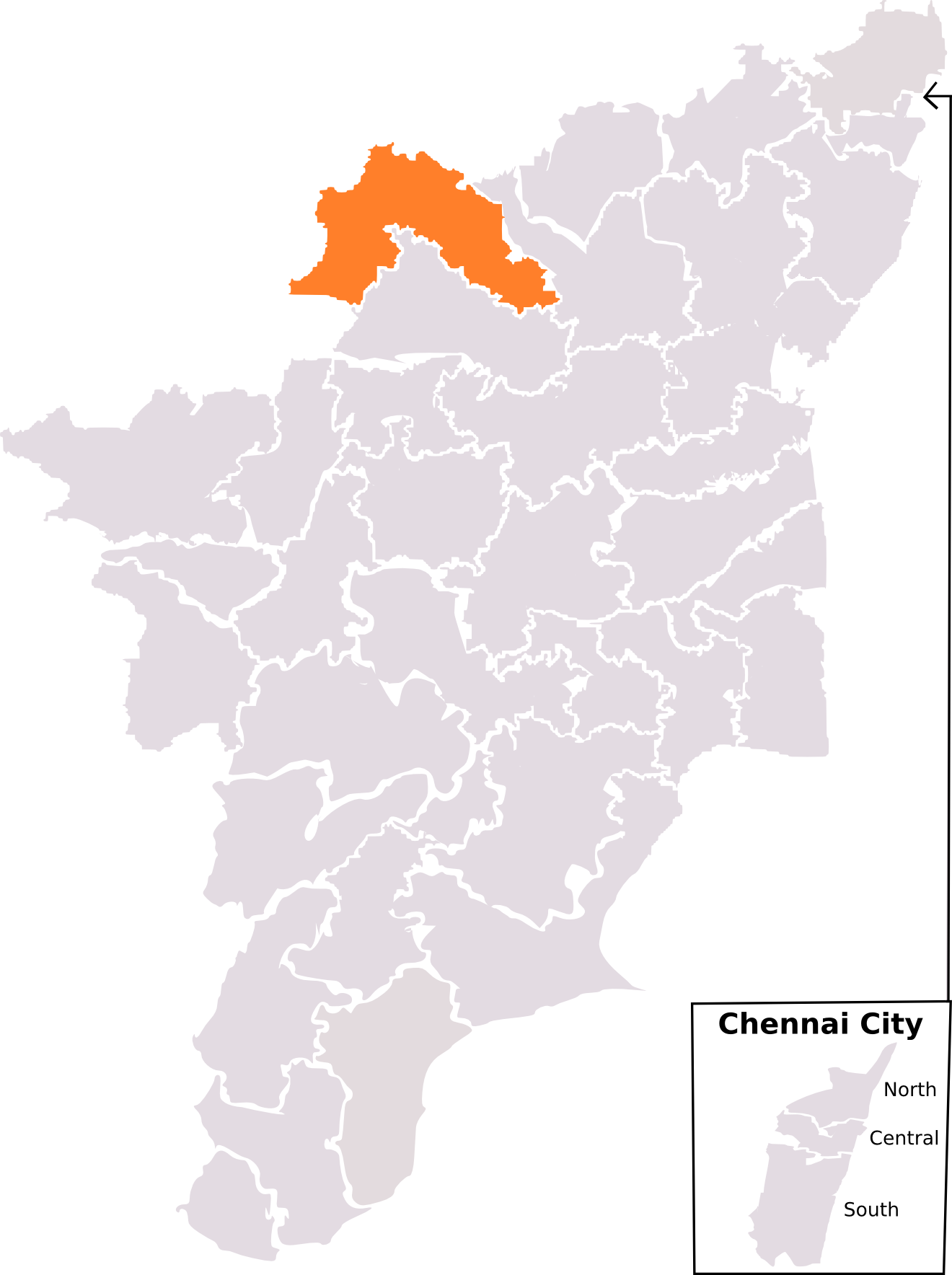
- Krishnagiri constituency, post-2008 delimitation

Constituency details
- Country: India
- Region: South India
- State: Tamil Nadu
- Assembly constituencies: Uthangarai; Bargur; Krishnagiri; Veppanahalli; Hosur; Thalli
- Established: 1951-present
- Total electors: 15,26,348

Member of Parliament
- 18th Lok Sabha
- Incumbent K. Gopinath
- Party: INC
- Alliance: INDIA
- Elected year: 2024

Krishnagiri is a Lok Sabha (Parliament of India) constituency in Tamil Nadu. Its Tamil Nadu Parliamentary Constituency number is 9 of 39.

== Assembly segments ==
=== 2009–present ===
Constituency number	Name	Reserved for (SC/ST/None)	District	Party	2024 Lead
51	Uthangarai	SC	Krishnagiri	TVK	INC
52	Bargur	None	Krishnagiri	AIADMK	INC
53	Krishnagiri	None	Krishnagiri	TVK	INC
54	Veppanahalli	None	Krishnagiri	DMK	INC
55	Hosur	None	Krishnagiri	AIADMK	INC
56	Thalli	None	Krishnagiri	CPI	INC

=== Before 2009 ===
1. Hosur
2. Thalli
3. Kaveripattinam (defunct)
4. Krishnagiri
5. Bargur
6. Palacode (moved to Dharmapuri constituency after 2009)

== Members of Parliament ==
Year	Winning Candidate	Party
1951	C. R. Narasimhan	Indian National Congress
1957	C. R. Narasimhan	Indian National Congress
1962	K. Rajaram	Dravida Munnetra Kazhagam
1967	M. Kamalanathan	Dravida Munnetra Kazhagam
1971	T. Thirthagiri Gounder	Indian National Congress
1971 (by-election)	C. Subramaniam	Indian National Congress
1977	P.V. Periasamy	All India Anna Dravida Munnetra Kazhagam
1980	Vazhappady K. Ramamurthy	Indian National Congress
1984	Vazhappady K. Ramamurthy	Indian National Congress
1989	Vazhappady K. Ramamurthy	Indian National Congress
1991	Vazhappady K. Ramamurthy	Indian National Congress
1996	C. Narasimhan	Tamil Maanila Congress
1998	K. P. Munusamy	All India Anna Dravida Munnetra Kazhagam
1999	V. Vetriselvam	Dravida Munnetra Kazhagam
2004	E.G. Sugavanam	Dravida Munnetra Kazhagam
2009	E.G. Sugavanam	Dravida Munnetra Kazhagam
2014	K. Ashok Kumar	All India Anna Dravida Munnetra Kazhagam
2019	A. Chellakumar	Indian National Congress
2024	K. Gopinath	Indian National Congress

== Election results ==
Vote share of Winning candidates
2024	42.27%
2019	52.60%
2014	44.93%
2009	44.64%
2004	54.59%
1999	51.05%
1998	50.71%
1991	56.08%
1989	61.04%
1984	64.74%
1980	63.03%
1977	65.64%
1971	55.18%
1967	50.78%
1962	48.78%
1957	40.00%
1951	41.88%

=== General Elections 2024 ===
2024 Indian general election: Krishnagiri
Party	Candidate	Votes	%	±%
INC	K. Gopinath	492,883	42.27	−10.33
AIADMK	V. Jayaprakash	3,00,397	25.76	−13.35
BJP	C. Narasimhan	2,14,125	18.36	New
NOTA	None of the above	10,983	0.94	−0.18
Margin of victory		1,92,486	16.51	+3.02
Turnout		11,66,156	72.43	−3.52
Registered electors		16,09,913		
INC hold		Swing	-10.33	

=== General Elections 2019 ===
2019 Indian general election: Krishnagiri
Party	Candidate	Votes	%	±%
INC	Dr. A. Chellakumar	611,298	52.60	48.96
AIADMK	K. P. Munusamy	4,54,533	39.11	−5.83
NOTA	Nota	19,825	1.71	0.21
MNM	Sri Karunya Subrahmanyam	16,995	1.46	
Independent	S. Ganesa Kumar	8,867	0.76	
Margin of victory		1,56,765	13.49	−5.83
Turnout		11,62,273	75.95	−1.55
Registered electors		15,30,404		
INC gain from AIADMK		Swing	7.66	

=== General Elections 2014 ===
2014 Indian general election: Krishnagiri
Party	Candidate	Votes	%	±%
AIADMK	K. Ashok Kumar	480,491	44.93	10.47
DMK	P. Chinna Pillappa	2,73,900	25.61	−19.03
PMK	G. K. Mani	2,24,963	21.04	
INC	Dr. A. Chellakumar	38,885	3.64	
NOTA	None Of The Above	16,020	1.50	
BSP	M. Chanbasha	8,618	0.81	
Margin of victory		2,06,591	19.32	9.14
Turnout		10,69,343	77.49	3.33
Registered electors		13,79,957		
AIADMK gain from DMK		Swing	0.29	

=== General Elections 2009 ===
2009 Indian general election: Krishnagiri
Party	Candidate	Votes	%	±%
DMK	E. G. Sugavanam	335,977	44.64	−9.95
AIADMK	K. Nanje Gowdu	2,59,379	34.47	−3.99
DMDK	D. Anbarasan	97,546	12.96	
BJP	G. Balakrishnan	20,486	2.72	
Independent	K. Venkatesan	8,452	1.12	
Independent	B. S. Chandran	6,396	0.85	
Margin of victory		76,598	10.18	−5.96
Turnout		10,14,758	74.16	15.18
Registered electors		7,52,565		
DMK hold		Swing	-9.95	

=== General Elections 2004 ===
2004 Indian general election: Krishnagiri
Party	Candidate	Votes	%	±%
DMK	E. G. Sugavanam	403,297	54.59	3.55
AIADMK	K. Nanje Gowdu	2,84,075	38.45	−7.92
BSP	H. Sanaulla Shariff	14,055	1.90	
Independent	A. Syed Nikhar	11,830	1.60	
Independent	S. Ameerjan	8,679	1.17	
Independent	P. K. Kuppusamy	6,277	0.85	
Independent	V. M. Krishnamoorthy Rao	6,253	0.85	
Independent	T. V. Krishnachetty	4,271	0.58	
Margin of victory		1,19,222	16.14	11.47
Turnout		7,38,737	58.98	−1.00
Rejected ballots		511	0.07	
Registered electors		12,52,580		
DMK hold		Swing	3.55	

=== General Elections 1999 ===
1999 Indian general election: Krishnagiri
Party	Candidate	Votes	%	±%
DMK	V. Vetriselvan	347,737	51.05	
AIADMK	M. Thambidurai	3,15,913	46.38	−4.33
JD(S)	G. A. Vadivelu	13,154	1.93	
Margin of victory		31,824	4.67	−3.25
Turnout		6,81,212	59.97	1.89
Registered electors		11,63,690		
DMK gain from AIADMK		Swing	0.34	

=== General Elections 1998 ===
1998 Indian general election: Krishnagiri
Party	Candidate	Votes	%	±%
AIADMK	K. P. Munusamy	315,762	50.71	
TMC(M)	D. R. Rajaram	2,66,413	42.78	
INC	Aga. Krishnamurthy	35,229	5.66	−50.42
BSP	R. Muniraj	5,285	0.85	
Margin of victory		49,349	7.93	−40.29
Turnout		6,22,689	58.08	−6.89
Registered electors		11,15,876		
AIADMK gain from INC		Swing	-5.37	

=== General Elections 1991 ===
1991 Indian general election: Krishnagiri
Party	Candidate	Votes	%	±%
INC	Vazhappady K. Ramamurthy	353,033	56.08	−4.96
JD	R. Manickam	1,39,919	22.23%	
BJP	B. Subramanian	49,496	7.86	
PMK	R. Raju	29,511	4.69	
THMM	R. Nanda Kumar	3,887	0.62	
Margin of victory		3,03,537	48.22	14.27
Turnout		6,29,532	64.98	1.63
Registered electors		10,05,354		
INC hold		Swing	-4.96	

=== General Elections 1989 ===
1989 Indian general election: Krishnagiri
Party	Candidate	Votes	%	±%
INC	Vazhappady K. Ramamurthy	362,376	61.04	−3.69
JD	B. Venkataswamy	1,60,882	27.10	
PMK	C. Arumugam	49,814	8.39	
Tamiliar Kazhagam	C. A. Balakrishnan	7,138	1.20	
THMM	R. Nandkumar	4,470	0.75	
Independent	C. Murugesan	4,465	0.75	
Independent	T. Thotlan	2,744	0.46	
Margin of victory		2,01,494	33.94	−1.39
Turnout		5,93,642	63.34	−6.21
Registered electors		9,58,580		
INC hold		Swing	-3.69	

=== General Elections 1984 ===
1984 Indian general election: Krishnagiri
Party	Candidate	Votes	%	±%
INC	Vazhappady K. Ramamurthy	304,854	64.74	
DMK	T. Chandrasekaran	1,38,488	29.41	
Independent	R. Ramakrishna Reddy	8,362	1.78	
Independent	S. Sundararaja Rao	8,121	1.72	
Independent	K. C. Kanmani	6,247	1.33	
Independent	T. Thiyagaraja Reddy	4,850	1.03	
Margin of victory		1,66,366	35.33	6.90
Turnout		4,70,922	69.56	14.35
Registered electors		7,24,417		
INC gain from INC(I)		Swing	1.70	

=== General Elections 1980 ===
1980 Indian general election: Krishnagiri
Party	Candidate	Votes	%	±%
INC(I)	Vazhappady K. Ramamurthy	222,839	63.03	
AIADMK	V. Rajahagopal	1,22,328	34.60	−31.04
INC(U)	Nambiraj	4,806	1.36	
Independent	K. M. Saminathan	3,552	1.00	
Margin of victory		1,00,511	28.43	−6.67
Turnout		3,53,525	55.21	−4.75
Registered electors		6,56,215		
INC(I) gain from AIADMK		Swing	-2.61	

=== General Elections 1977 ===
1977 Indian general election: Krishnagiri
Party	Candidate	Votes	%	±%
AIADMK	P. V. Periasamy	222,979	65.64	
DMK	M. Kamalanathan	1,03,751	30.54	
Independent	A. Shanmugam	4,949	1.46	
Independent	Parasuraman	2,778	0.82	
Independent	S. Seetharama Reddy	2,163	0.64	
Margin of victory		1,19,228	35.10	24.75
Turnout		3,39,698	59.96	−4.95
Registered electors		5,83,179		
AIADMK gain from INC		Swing	10.46	

=== General Elections 1971 ===
1971 Indian general election: Krishnagiri
Party	Candidate	Votes	%	±%
INC	T. Thirthagiri Gounder	186,114	55.18	10.03
SWA	T. M. Thirupathy	1,51,194	44.82	
Margin of victory		34,920	10.35	4.73
Turnout		3,37,308	64.91	−2.05
Registered electors		5,49,124		
INC gain from DMK		Swing	4.40	

=== General Elections 1967 ===
1967 Indian general election: Krishnagiri
Party	Candidate	Votes	%	±%
DMK	M. Kamalanathan	165,079	50.78	1.99
INC	T. S. Pattabiraman	1,46,785	45.15	−0.34
Independent	S. A. Pandit	13,247	4.07	
Margin of victory		18,294	5.63	2.34
Turnout		3,25,111	66.96	9.69
Registered electors		5,03,298		
DMK hold		Swing	1.99	

=== General Elections 1962 ===
1962 Indian general election: Krishnagiri
Party	Candidate	Votes	%	±%
DMK	K. Rajaram	127,508	48.78	
INC	C. R. Narasimhan	1,18,907	45.49	5.49
Independent	T. D. Balakrishnan	14,965	5.73	
Margin of victory		8,601	3.29	3.04
Turnout		2,61,380	57.27	25.00
Registered electors		4,73,080		
DMK gain from INC		Swing	8.78	

=== General Elections 1957 ===
1957 Indian general election: Krishnagiri
Party	Candidate	Votes	%	±%
INC	C. R. Narasimhan	57,683	40.00	−1.88
Independent	Gopalswamy Doraiswamy Naidu	57,316	39.75	
Independent	R. Muthulingam	15,607	10.82	
Independent	R. Jagannathan	13,588	9.42	
Margin of victory		367	0.25	−3.95
Turnout		1,44,194	32.26	−9.18
Registered electors		4,46,928		
INC hold		Swing	-1.88	

=== General Elections 1951 ===
1951–52 Indian general election: Krishnagiri
Party	Candidate	Votes	%	±%
INC	C. R. Narasimhan	61,672	41.88	41.88
Independent	C. Doraisami Gounder	55,478	37.68	
KMPP	K. Shamanna	15,929	10.82	
Independent	M. G. Natesa Chettiar	14,174	9.63	
Margin of victory		6,194	4.21	
Turnout		1,47,253	41.44	
Registered electors		3,55,317		
INC win (new seat)				

== See also ==
- Election Commission of India
- Krishnagiri
- List of constituencies of the Lok Sabha
