= V. Govindarasu =

Member, Tamil Nadu Legislative Assembly
- In office 2001–2006
- Preceded by: Kanchana Kamalanathan
- Succeeded by: T. Senguttuvan
- Constituency: Krishnagiri

Personal details
- Born: 1 February 1960 Dwarakapuri
- Party: All India Anna Dravida Munnetra Kazhagam
- Profession: Farmer

V. Govindarasu is an Indian politician and a former member of the Tamil Nadu Legislative Assembly. He hails from Dwarakapuri village in Krishnagiri district. Govindarasu, who has a school education, belongs to the All India Anna Dravida Munnetra Kazhagam (AIADMK). He contested and won the Krishnagiri assembly constituency in the 2001 Tamil Nadu Legislative Assembly election and became a Member of the Legislative Assembly.

== Electoral performance ==
=== 2001 ===
2001 Tamil Nadu Legislative Assembly election: Krishnagiri
Party	Candidate	Votes	%	±%
AIADMK	V. Govindarasu	65,197	56.59%	+26.13
DMK	T. Senguttuvan	43,424	37.69%	−26.42
Independent	P. Jayaseelan	2,861	2.48%	New
MDMK	K. R. Pandian	2,093	1.82%	+0.07
Independent	M. Krishnamurthy	938	0.81%	New
Independent	M. Arumugasubramani	690	0.60%	New
Margin of victory		21,773	18.90%	−14.75%
Turnout		115,203	59.51%	−5.33%
Registered electors		193,656		
AIADMK gain from DMK		Swing	-7.52%	
