= C. R. Narasimhan =

Indian politician and freedom-fighter

Sri. Chakravarti Rajagopalachari Narasimhan

Member of Parliament, Lok Sabha
- In office 1952–1962
- Prime Minister: Jawaharlal Nehru
- Preceded by: Position established
- Succeeded by: K. Rajaram
- Constituency: Krishnagiri

Personal details
- Born: 1909 Salem, Tamil Nadu
- Died: 1989 (aged 79–80)
- Party: Indian National Congress
- Parent(s): C. Rajagopalachari; Alamelu Mangalamma
- Profession: Politician

Chakravarti Rajagopalachari Narasimhan (1909–1989) was an Indian politician, freedom-fighter and member of the Indian Parliament from 1952 to 1962. He was the son of Indian statesman Chakravarti Rajagopalachari.

== Early life ==
Narasimhan was born in Salem in 1909 to Chakravarti Rajagopalachari and Chakravarti Alamelu Mangamma in a Tamil speaking family. Rajagopalachari was a lawyer and member of the Salem municipality at that time. Narasimhan joined the Indian independence movement in 1920 at the age of 11 and was imprisoned for his participation in the 1930 Vedaranyam Salt Satyagraha.

== Post-independence politics ==
In 1951, Narasimhan stood for the Lok Sabha elections from Krishnagiri parliamentary constituency and was elected by a margin of 6,194 votes over his nearest rival, C. Doraisami Gounder. He was re-elected to the Lok Sabha in 1957 by a close margin of 367 votes over his nearest rival G. D. Naidu and served till 1962 when he lost his seat to K. Rajaram of the Dravida Munnetra Kazhagam. He stayed on in the Indian National Congress even after his father had quit the party and had allied with its opponents quitting the Indian National Congress and joining the Swatantra Party only in the 1960s.

In 1970, Narasimhan was elected to the Corporation of Madras and served till 1975. He was also the leader of the Swatantra Party in the corporation. Narasimhan was at Rajaji's bedside when he died in his hospital bed on 27 December 1972.

Narasimhan also served as Chairman, Gandhi ashram, Tiruchengode and as a member of the Tamil Nadu Prohibition Committee.

== Death ==
Narasimhan died in 1989 at the age of 80 by a stroke.

== Family ==
Narasimhan is the maternal uncle of Rajmohan Gandhi, Gopalkrishna Gandhi, Ramchandra Gandhi and Tara (Bhattacharya).
