= K. Rajaram =

Indian politician

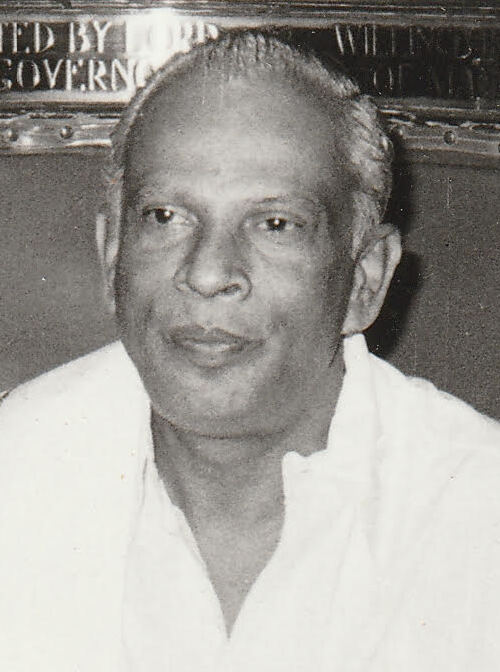
- Rajaram as speaker of the Tamil Nadu Legislative Assembly

Minister for Food and Civil Supplies of Tamil Nadu
- In office 1991–1992
- Chief Minister: J. Jayalalithaa

Member of Tamil Nadu Legislative Assembly for Panamarathupatti
- In office 1991–1996
- Preceded by: S. R. Sivalingam
- Succeeded by: S. R. Sivalingam

Member of Tamil Nadu Legislative Assembly for Panamarathupatti
- In office 1980–1989
- Preceded by: N. Subbarayan
- Succeeded by: S. R. Sivalingam

Tamil Nadu minister for Industries and Irrigation
- In office 1985–1989
- Chief Minister: M. G. Ramachandran

5th Speaker of the Tamil Nadu Legislative Assembly
- In office 1980–1985
- Deputy: P. H. Pandian
- Chief Minister: M. G. Ramachandran
- Preceded by: Munu Adhi
- Succeeded by: P. H. Pandian

Tamil Nadu minister for Labour
- In office 1973–1976
- Chief Minister: M. Karunanidhi

Tamil Nadu minister for Housing and Backward Classes
- In office 1971–1973
- Chief Minister: M. Karunanidhi

Member of Tamil Nadu Legislative Assembly for Salem II
- In office 1971–1976
- Preceded by: E. R. Krishnan
- Succeeded by: M. Arumugam

Member of parliament, Lok Sabha for Salem
- In office 1967–1971
- Prime Minister: Indira Gandhi
- Preceded by: S. V. Ramaswamy
- Succeeded by: E. R. Krishnan

Member of parliament, Lok Sabha for Krishnagiri
- In office 1962–1967
- Prime Minister: Jawaharlal Nehru, Lal Bahadur Shastri, Indira Gandhi
- Preceded by: C. R. Narasimhan
- Succeeded by: M. Kamalanathan

Personal details
- Born: 26 August 1926
- Died: 8 February 2008 (aged 82)
- Party: All India Anna Dravida Munnetra Kazhagam
- Other political affiliations: Dravida Munnetra Kazhagam (until 1977) and Makkal Dravida Munnetra Kazhagam (1977)
- Spouse: Santhakumari Rajaram
- Relations: • K. Jayaseelan (Brother) • K. Rajendran ( Brother) • K. Sulochana (Sister) • K. Manonmani (Sister) • K. Prema (Sister) • K. Kanthraj (Brother) • K. A. Manoharan (co - brother)
- Children: R. Rajasekar
- Parent(s): Father: Kasthuri Pillai; Mother: Vijayambal
- Profession: Politician

Kasthuri Rajaram (26 August 1926 – 8 February 2008) was an Indian politician of the Dravida Munnetra Kazhagam (DMK) and later, All India Anna Dravida Munnetra Kazhagam (AIADMK) and Member of the Legislative Assembly of Tamil Nadu. He served as the Speaker of the Tamil Nadu Legislative Assembly from 1980 to 1985.

Rajaram rose to prominence in 1962 when he defeated C. R. Narasimhan, son of C. Rajagopalachari while contesting from Krishnagiri as a candidate of the Dravida Munnetra Kazhagam. He was elected to the Tamil Nadu Legislative Assembly from Salem II constituency in 1971 as a DMK candidate and from the Panamarathupatti constituency in 1980, 1984 and 1991 as an ADMK candidate. He served as the Minister for Housing and Backward Classes during 1971–73 and as the Minister for Labour during 1973–76 in the M. Karunanidhi cabinet. He was the Minister for Industries during 1985–89 in the M. G. Ramachandran cabinet and the Minister for Food during 1991–92 in the J. Jayalalithaa cabinet. He also served as a Member of Lok Sabha from Krishnagiri during 1962–67 and from Salem during 1967–71.

== Literary works ==
=== Books ===
Year	Type	Work	Publisher
1994	Autobiography	Oru Saamaaniyanin Ninaivugal (Tamil)	Nakkheeran Publications

== Notes ==
Preceded by C. R. Narasimhan	Member of Indian Parliament (Lok Sabha) for Krishnagiri; 1962–1967	Succeeded by M. Kamalanathan
Preceded by S. V. Ramaswamy	Member of Indian Parliament (Lok Sabha) for Salem; 1967–1971	Succeeded by E. R. Krishnan
Preceded by Munu Adhi	Speaker of the Tamil Nadu Legislative Assembly; 1980–1985	Succeeded by P. H. Pandian
