= K. Ashok Kumar =

Indian politician

Krishnamurthy Ashok Kumar

Member of the Tamil Nadu Legislative Assembly
- In office 12 May 2021 – 4 May 2026
- Preceded by: T. Senguttuvan
- Succeeded by: P. Mukundhan
- Constituency: Krishnagiri

Member of Parliament, Lok Sabha
- In office 1 September 2014 – 23 May 2019
- Preceded by: E.G. Sugavanam
- Succeeded by: A. Chellakumar
- Constituency: Krishnagiri

Personal details
- Born: 27 September 1953 (age 72)
- Party: All India Anna Dravida Munnetra Kazhagam
- Parent(s): T. Krishnamurthy Gounder, Son of M. Thayappa Gounder (Vellala Gounder)
- Occupation: Agriculturist & Businessperson
- As of 17 December, 2016

Krishnamurthy Ashok Kumar (born 1953), better known as K. Ashok Kumar, is an Indian politician and Member of Parliament elected from Tamil Nadu. He is elected to the Lok Sabha from Krishnagiri constituency as an Anna Dravida Munnetra Kazhagam candidate in 2014 election.

He is the chairman of the Krishnagiri District Panchayat.

== Electoral performance ==
2021 Tamil Nadu Legislative Assembly election: Krishnagiri
Party	Candidate	Votes	%	±%
AIADMK	K. Ashok Kumar	96,050	45.38%	+4.03
DMK	T. Senguttuvan	95,256	45.01%	+1.21
NTK	V. Nirandari	11,137	5.26%	New
MNM	R. K. Ravishankar	3,455	1.63%	New
NOTA	NOTA	1,837	0.87%	−0.06
NCP	K. M. Chandramohan	1,088	0.51%	New
Margin of victory		794	0.38%	−2.07%
Turnout		211,648	79.52%	−0.88%
Rejected ballots		605	0.29%	
Registered electors		266,167		
AIADMK gain from DMK		Swing	1.58%	
