= Vaithilingam =

Vaithilingam is a family name. People with this name include:

- Daisy Vaithilingam (1925–2014), Singaporean social worker
- M. A. Vaithyalingam, Indian politician
- R. Vaithilingam, Indian politician
- V. Vaithilingam, Indian politician
- Vaithilingam Sornalingam (1949–2001), better known as Shankar (Tamil militant)
