= Tambaram Assembly constituency =

State Legislative Assembly Constituency in Tamil Nadu

Coordinates: 12.92°N 80.12°E

Tambaram
- Constituency No. 31 for the Tamil Nadu Legislative Assembly
- Interactive map outlining Tambaram assembly constituency

Constituency details
- Country: India
- Region: South India
- State: Tamil Nadu
- District: Chengalpattu
- Lok Sabha constituency: Sriperumbudur
- Established: 1977
- Total electors: 330,060
- Reservation: None

Member of Legislative Assembly
- 17th Tamil Nadu Legislative Assembly
- Incumbent Sarathkumar
- Party: TVK
- Elected year: 2026

Tambaram is a state assembly constituency in Chengalpattu district, Tamil Nadu, India. Its State Assembly Constituency number is 31. It includes all wards from Zone 4 and Zone 5, wards comprising the rest of the areas other than Hashinapuram and Nemilichery in Zone 3 of Tambaram City Municipal Corporation and Agaramthen, Madurapakkam and Kovilanchery villages in St. Thomas Mount Panchayat Union. It forms a part of Sriperumbudur Lok Sabha constituency for national elections. It is one of the 234 State Legislative Assembly Constituencies in Tamil Nadu in India.

== Members of Legislative Assembly ==
Year	Member	Political party
1977	Munu Adhi	All India Anna Dravida Munnetra Kazhagam
1980	Pammal Nallathambi	Dravida Munnetra Kazhagam
1984	Ella Rajamanickam	All India Anna Dravida Munnetra Kazhagam
1989	M. A. Vaithyalingam	Dravida Munnetra Kazhagam
1991	S. M. Krishnan	Indian National Congress
1996	M. A. Vaithyalingam	Dravida Munnetra Kazhagam
2001	M. A. Vaithyalingam	Dravida Munnetra Kazhagam
2006	S. R. Raja	Dravida Munnetra Kazhagam
2011	T. K. M. Chinnayya	All India Anna Dravida Munnetra Kazhagam
2016	S. R. Raja	Dravida Munnetra Kazhagam
2021	S. R. Raja	Dravida Munnetra Kazhagam
2026	Sarathkumar	Tamilaga Vettri Kazhagam

== Election results ==
Vote share of winning candidates
2026	42.67%
2021	46.93%
2016	43.27%
2011	51.45%
2006	48.00%
2001	46.86%
1996	64.91%
1991	57.82%
1989	47.03%
1984	51.75%
1977	35.22%

=== 2026 ===
2026 Tamil Nadu Legislative Assembly election: Tambaram
Party	Candidate	Votes	%	±%
TVK	Sarathkumar	118,967	42.67	New
DMK	R. S. Kiruthika Devi	83,346	29.89	▼17.04
AIADMK	C. Rajendran	61,991	22.23	▼9.91
NTK	S. Tamilchelvi	11,627	4.17	▼3.66
NOTA	NOTA	1,512	0.54	▼0.38
Margin of victory		35,621	12.78	▼2.01
Turnout		2,78,809	84.44	▲24.52
Registered electors		3,30,181		▼85,306
TVK gain from DMK		Swing	▲42.67	

=== 2021 ===
2021 Tamil Nadu Legislative Assembly election: Tambaram
Party	Candidate	Votes	%	±%
DMK	S. R. Raja	116,840	46.93%	+3.66
AIADMK	T. K. M. Chinnayya	80,016	32.14%	−4.99
MNM	Elango Siva	22,530	9.05%	New
NTK	T. Sureshkumar	19,494	7.83%	+5.6
AMMK	M. Karikalan	4,207	1.69%	New
NOTA	NOTA	2,284	0.92%	−1.21
Tamil Nadu Ilangyar Katchi	P. A. Abdulnazar	1,351	0.54%	New
Margin of victory		36,824	14.79%	8.65%
Turnout		248,968	59.92%	−1.79%
Rejected ballots		465	0.19%	
Registered electors		415,487		
DMK hold		Swing	3.66%	

=== 2016 ===
2016 Tamil Nadu Legislative Assembly election: Tambaram
Party	Candidate	Votes	%	±%
DMK	S. R. Raja	101,835	43.27%	−0.34
AIADMK	C. Rajendran	87,390	37.13%	−14.32
DMDK	M. Chezhiyan	14,559	6.19%	New
BJP	A. Vedasubramaniam	10,327	4.39%	+2.67
PMK	R. Suresh	7,631	3.24%	New
NTK	B. Naganathan	5,237	2.23%	New
NOTA	NOTA	5,007	2.13%	New
Margin of victory		14,445	6.14%	−1.71%
Turnout		235,355	61.71%	−8.17%
Registered electors		381,359		
DMK gain from AIADMK		Swing	-8.18%	

=== 2011 ===
2011 Tamil Nadu Legislative Assembly election: Tambaram
Party	Candidate	Votes	%	±%
AIADMK	T. K. M. Chinnayya	91,702	51.45%	New
DMK	S. R. Raja	77,718	43.61%	−4.4
BJP	A. Veda Subramaniam	3,061	1.72%	−0.7
MGRTK	D. K. George	1,449	0.81%	New
IJK	M. Raju	955	0.54%	New
Margin of victory		13,984	7.85%	−0.83%
Turnout		178,230	69.89%	5.51%
Registered electors		255,030		
AIADMK gain from DMK		Swing	3.45%	

=== 2006 ===
2006 Tamil Nadu Legislative Assembly election: Tambaram
Party	Candidate	Votes	%	±%
DMK	S. R. Raja	269,717	48.00%	+1.14
MDMK	K. Somu	220,965	39.33%	+33.88
DMDK	K. Dharma	48,522	8.64%	New
BJP	V. R. Sivaraman	13,598	2.42%	New
Margin of victory		48,752	8.68%	6.99%
Turnout		561,888	64.37%	22.86%
Registered electors		872,877		
DMK hold		Swing	1.14%	

=== 2001 ===
2001 Tamil Nadu Legislative Assembly election: Tambaram
Party	Candidate	Votes	%	±%
DMK	M. A. Vaithyalingam	150,961	46.86%	−18.04
TMC(M)	K. Chakkaraipani Reddiar	145,530	45.18%	New
MDMK	K. Somu	17,552	5.45%	−1.32
Margin of victory		5,431	1.69%	−42.76%
Turnout		322,120	41.51%	−13.02%
Registered electors		776,058		
DMK hold		Swing	-18.04%	

=== 1996 ===
1996 Tamil Nadu Legislative Assembly election: Tambaram
Party	Candidate	Votes	%	±%
DMK	M. A. Vaithyalingam	166,401	64.91%	+31.36
INC	K. B. Madhavan	52,442	20.46%	−37.36
MDMK	K. Somasundaram	17,350	6.77%	New
PMK	D. Elumalai	8,500	3.32%	New
BJP	A. Ponsoliappan	7,328	2.86%	+0.2
Margin of victory		113,959	44.45%	20.18%
Turnout		256,370	54.53%	1.50%
Registered electors		481,911		
DMK gain from INC		Swing	7.09%	

=== 1991 ===
1991 Tamil Nadu Legislative Assembly election: Tambaram
Party	Candidate	Votes	%	±%
INC	S. M. Krishnan	111,588	57.82%	+34.96
DMK	M. A. Vaithyalingam	64,740	33.54%	−13.48
PMK	D. Elumalai	9,270	4.80%	New
BJP	M. G. Nanasekaran	5,126	2.66%	+1.95
JP	R. Kailasam	1,085	0.56%	New
Margin of victory		46,848	24.27%	0.10%
Turnout		193,002	53.03%	−10.71%
Registered electors		373,559		
INC gain from DMK		Swing	10.79%	

=== 1989 ===
1989 Tamil Nadu Legislative Assembly election: Tambaram
Party	Candidate	Votes	%	±%
DMK	M. A. Vaithyalingam	90,007	47.03%	+0.2
INC	A. J. Doss	43,746	22.86%	New
Independent	S. Venkatesan	29,583	15.46%	New
AIADMK	Eila. Rajamanickam	21,751	11.36%	−40.38
BJP	M. Gnanasekaran	1,356	0.71%	New
Independent	R. Victor	1,176	0.61%	New
Margin of victory		46,261	24.17%	19.25%
Turnout		191,400	63.74%	−4.26%
Registered electors		305,128		
DMK gain from AIADMK		Swing	-4.72%	

=== 1984 ===
1984 Tamil Nadu Legislative Assembly election: Tambaram
Party	Candidate	Votes	%	±%
AIADMK	Ella Rajamanickam	75,155	51.75%	+5.54
DMK	M. A. Vaithyalingam	68,009	46.83%	−4.69
Margin of victory		7,146	4.92%	−0.40%
Turnout		145,238	68.00%	2.47%
Registered electors		222,649		
AIADMK gain from DMK		Swing	0.23%	

=== 1980 ===
1980 Tamil Nadu Legislative Assembly election: Tambaram
Party	Candidate	Votes	%	±%
DMK	Pammal Nallathambi	59,931	51.52%	+16.77
AIADMK	Munu Adhi	53,746	46.20%	+10.99
JP	M. Gajendran	1,999	1.72%	New
Margin of victory		6,185	5.32%	4.85%
Turnout		116,326	65.53%	6.23%
Registered electors		179,404		
DMK gain from AIADMK		Swing	16.30%	

=== 1977 ===
1977 Tamil Nadu Legislative Assembly election: Tambaram
Party	Candidate	Votes	%	±%
AIADMK	Munu Adhi	32,394	35.22%	New
DMK	Pammal Nallathambi	31,968	34.75%	New
JP	S. Kannan	17,845	19.40%	New
INC	N. Murugesan	9,101	9.89%	New
Independent	R. Chandrasekaran	678	0.74%	New
Margin of victory		426	0.46%	
Turnout		91,986	59.29%	
Registered electors		157,010		
AIADMK win (new seat)				
