= K. Samarasam =

Indian politician

Dr.Ko.Samarasam
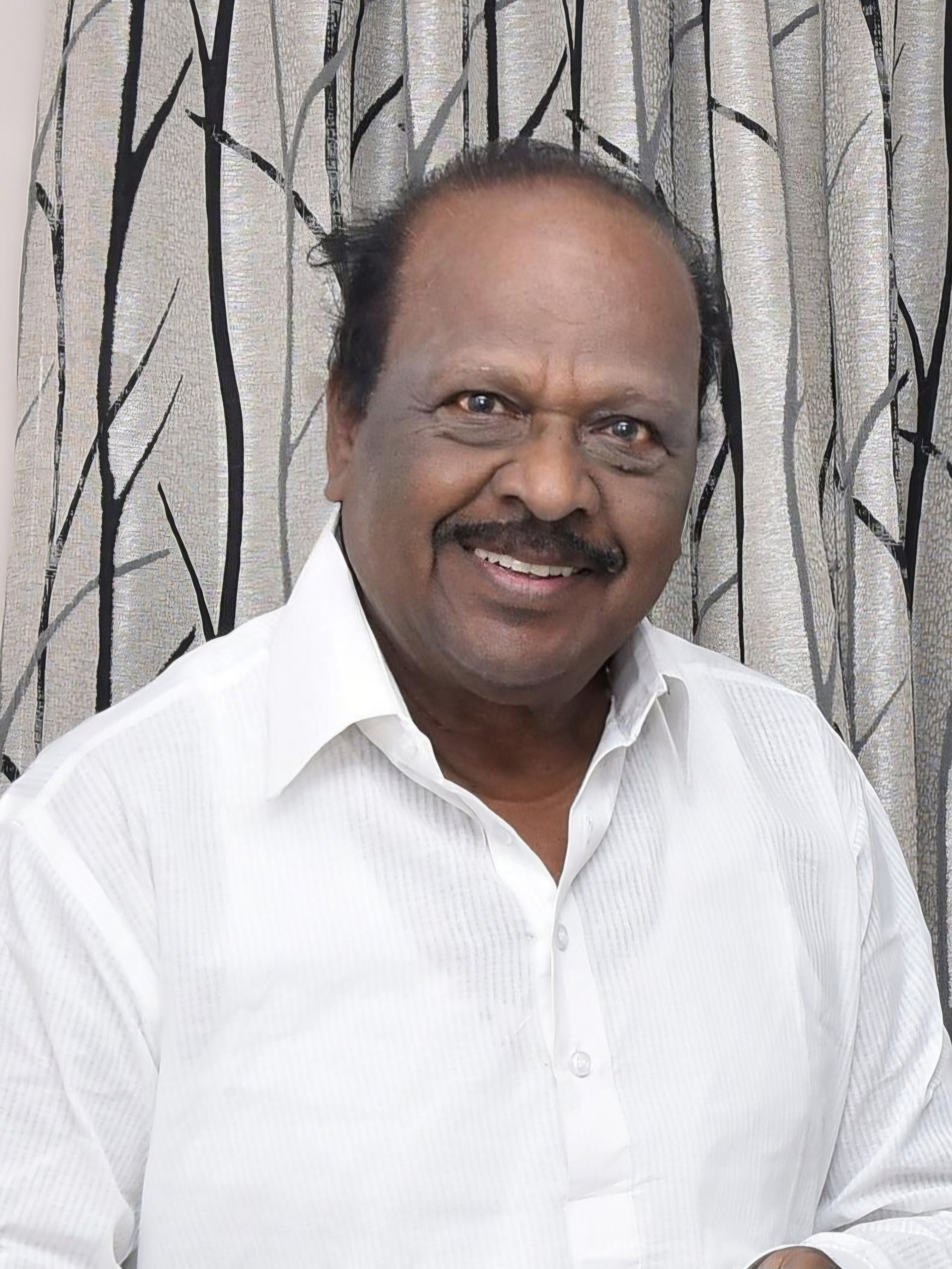

Member of Tamil Nadu Legislative Assembly
- In office 30 June 1977 – 17 February 1980
- Preceded by: V. C. Govindasamy Gounder
- Constituency: Kaveripattinam

Member of Tamil Nadu Legislative Assembly
- In office 9 June 1980 – 15 November 1984
- Succeeded by: Himself
- Constituency: Kaveripattinam

Member of Tamil Nadu Legislative Assembly
- In office 24 December 1984 – 30 January 1988
- Succeeded by: V. C. Govindasamy Gounder
- Constituency: Kaveripattinam

Panel of chairmen in 8th session of 7th Tamil Nadu Legislative Assembly
- Incumbent
- Assumed office 15 February 1984

Senate of Madras University
- Incumbent
- Assumed office 22 February 1984

Tamilnadu Land Improvement Board member
- Incumbent
- Assumed office 19 April 1984

Chairmen in Committee on DELEGATED LEGISLATION
- Incumbent
- Assumed office 30 April 1984

Member in Committee on ESTIMATE and PUBIC ACCOUNTS
- Incumbent
- Assumed office 8 May 1986

Chairman on committee on PUBLIC UNDERTAKINGS
- Incumbent
- Assumed office 9 May 1986

Member in library committee
- Incumbent
- Assumed office 13 May 1986

Chairmen in 4th session of 8th Tamil Nadu Legislative Assembly
- Incumbent
- Assumed office 2 March 1987

Personal details
- Born: 13 November 1937 (age 88) Kaveripattinam, Krishnagiri district, Tamil Nadu, India
- Party: All India Anna Dravida Munnetra Kazhagam (1972 - present)
- Spouse: S.Alamelu
- Children: S.Kameshwari S.Sathiyavani K.S.Arivazhagan
- Education: M.A., Ph.D., D.Lit., D.H.M.P., F.G.M.C. G.C.H.M.
- Occupation: Politician; Homeopath; Actor; Writer

K. Samarasam (also Ko. Samarasam) is an Indian politician and former Member of the Legislative Assembly of Tamil Nadu. He is one of senior most party carde in All India Anna Dravida Munnetra Kazhagam. He has been a member since 1972 when the party formed. He was elected to the Tamil Nadu legislative assembly from Kaveripattinam constituency as an Anna Dravida Munnetra Kazhagam candidate in 1977, 1980 elections and 1984 election. He won three consecutive Tamil Nadu Legislative Assembly elections.

He was currently official spokesperson and speaker of All India Anna Dravida Munnetra Kazhagam. He is a member of the executive and general committees of All India Anna Dravida Munnetra Kazhagam and former All World M.G.R forum secretary'. He was wedded to the ideals of Periyar and Muthuramalinga Thevar. Attracted by his fiery oratorical skill, Dravidian leader Arignar Annadurai changed his name to Samarasam from Krishnan. He was picked by AIADMK founder and former CM late M.G. Ramachandran. He received the Thanthai Periyar award for 2012 from the then CM, J Jayalalithaa in 2013 and Anna Award from CM Edappadi K. Palaniswami, in 2020. Actor Rajnikanth gave him the MGR award during the MGR centenary celebrations in 2018.

== Early life and politics ==
Samarasam was born in Kaveripattinam, Krishnagiri District, Tamil Nadu in a Tamil agricultural family. His father was a member of Forward Bloc and Pasumpon Muthuramalinga Thevar used to stay in their house during campaigns. Since from childhood he was inspired by Periyar and C.N.Annadurai speeches. He got involved in Dravida ideology and rational thinking. In later years he became an ardent M.G. Ramachandran fan and joined the MGR forum. Later became one of trustworthy person to M.G. Ramachandran. In 1977 when Anna Dravida Munnetra Kazhagam faced Tamilnadu assembly election for first time, he was selected as a candidate in Kaveripattinam Assembly constituency and although he belongs to Agamudayar caste which was minority in that constituency, he won and made three consecutive wins in assembly election and became one of powerful politician during the M.G.R regime. In 1987 on that time Chief Minister of Tamil Nadu Ramachandran attended his daughter's marriage in Kaveripattinam which was arranged grand and celebrated like a festival by people of Kaveripattinam on that time and which was last wedding ceremony attended by MGR.

== Election results ==
=== Tamil Nadu Legislative elections ===
Elections	Constituency	Party	Result	% Votes	Opposition candidate	Opposition party	% Votes
1977 Tamil Nadu Assembly election	Kaveripattinam	AIADMK	Won	39.37	E.Pattabi naidu	JP	29.95
1980 Tamil Nadu Assembly election	Kaveripattinam	AIADMK	Won	51.13	S.Venkatesan	DMK	46.05
1984 Tamil Nadu Assembly election	Kaveripattinam	AIADMK	Won	57.18	V.C.Govindhaswamy gounder	DMK	38.19

== Awards and accolades ==
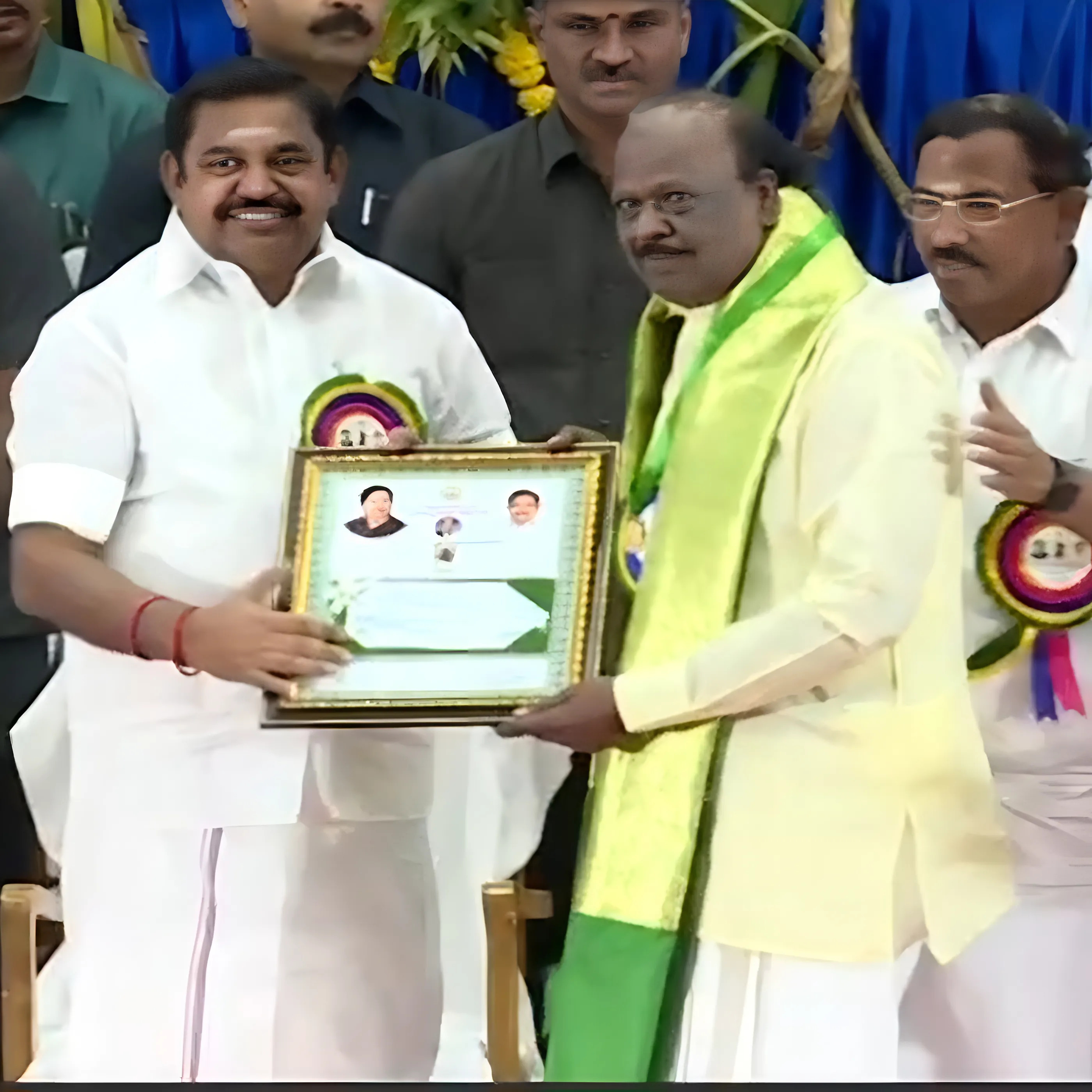
Dr.k.Samarasam receiving Perarignar anna award from Chief minister in 2020

- Recipient of Perarignar Anna Award for 2019 by Tamil valarchi thurai.
- Acted in supporting roles in Tamil movies like Rajinikanth starred Panakkaran and many more.
- Recipient of Thanthai Periyar Award for 2012 on 15 January 2013 from Jayalalithaa, chief minister of Tamil Nadu. The award carries cash reward of Rs. 1 lakh, 8 gram gold medal and a certificate of appreciation.
