= N. Elaiyaraja =

Indian politician (born 1979)

Natesan Elaiyaraja (born 1979) is an Indian politician from Tamil Nadu. He is a Member of the Legislative Assembly from Uthangarai Assembly constituency which is reserved for Scheduled Caste community in Krishnagiri district representing the Tamilaga Vettri Kazhagam.

Elaiyaraja is from Uthangarai, Krishnagiri district, Tamil Nadu. He is the son of Natesan. He is a dentist and his wife is a school teacher. He did BDS at a college affiliated with Annamalai University in 2003. He declared assets worth Rs.2 crore in the affidavit filed with the Election Commission of India.

Elaiyaraja became an MLA for the first time winning the 2026 Tamil Nadu Legislative Assembly election from Uthangarai Assembly constituency representing the Tamilaga Vettri Kazhagam. He polled 70,201 votes and defeated his nearest rival and sitting MLA, T. M. Tamilselvam of the All India Anna Dravida Munnetra Kazhagam, by a margin of 5,198 votes.
