= P. S. Srinivasan (DMK politician) =

Indian politician

Member of the Tamil Nadu Legislative Assembly
- Incumbent
- Assumed office 11 May 2026
- Preceded by: K. P. Munusamy
- Constituency: Veppanahalli

Personal details
- Party: Dravida Munnetra Kazhagam
- Profession: Politician

P. S. Srinivasan (born 1977) is an Indian politician from Tamil Nadu. He is a member of the Tamil Nadu Legislative Assembly from the Veppanahalli Assembly constituency in Krishnagiri district, representing the Dravida Munnetra Kazhagam.

Srinivasan is from Krishnagiri, Tamil Nadu. He is the son of the late Seethappa. He studied Class 12 at R.V. Government Boys Higher Secondary School and passed the board examinations in 1996.

== Career ==
Srinivasan won the Veppanahalli Assembly constituency representing the DMK in the 2026 Tamil Nadu Legislative Assembly election. He polled 74,691 votes and defeated his nearest rival K. P. Munusamy of the All India Anna Dravida Munnetra Kazhagam by a margin of 138 votes.
