= Salem – II Assembly constituency =

Former constituency in Tamil Nadu, India

Coordinates: 11.700°N 78.138°E

Salem-II
- Former constituency for the Tamil Nadu Legislative Assembly

Constituency details
- Country: India
- Region: South India
- State: Tamil Nadu
- District: Salem
- Lok Sabha constituency: Salem
- Established: 1951
- Abolished: 2008
- Reservation: None

Salem-II is a former state assembly constituency in Tamil Nadu.

== History ==
Until 2008, the city of Salem was part of the Salem I and Salem II assembly constituencies. Since 1977, the ADMK won the Salem II assembly seat three times (1980, 1984 and 1991) and the DMK also won three times (1989, 1996 and 2006); the Janata Party (JP) won in 1977 and Pattali Makkal Katchi (PMK) won in 2001.

The constituencies of Salem were redrawn as Salem North, Salem South and Salem West in 2008.

== Members of the Legislative Assembly ==
Year	Winner	Party
Madras State
1951	C. Lakshma Kandan	Indian National Congress
1957	A. Rathnavel Gounder	Indian National Congress
1962	A. Rathnavel Gounder	Indian National Congress
1967	E. R. Krishnan	Dravida Munnetra Kazhagam
Tamil Nadu
1971	K. Rajaram	Dravida Munnetra Kazhagam
1977	M. Arumugam	Janata Party
1980	M. Arumugam	All India Anna Dravida Munnetra Kazhagam
1984	Arumugam	All India Anna Dravida Munnetra Kazhagam
1989	S. Arumugam	Dravida Munnetra Kazhagam
1991	M. Natesan	All India Anna Dravida Munnetra Kazhagam
1996	A. L. Thangavel	Dravida Munnetra Kazhagam
2001	M. Karthe	Pattali Makkal Katchi
2006	S. Arumugam	Dravida Munnetra Kazhagam

== Election results ==
=== 2006 ===
2006 Tamil Nadu Legislative Assembly election: Salem – II
Party	Candidate	Votes	%	±%
DMK	Veerapandy S. Arumugam	85,348	47.27%	
MDMK	Sureshkumar R	70,605	39.11%	
DMDK	Gnanasekaran K V	20,026	11.09%	
BJP	Anandhan P T	1,574	0.87%	
BSP	Ponnusamy V	668	0.37%	
Independent	Sreedhar N	510	0.28%	
Margin of victory		14,743	8.17%	−4.97%
Turnout		180,545	72.20%	11.79%
DMK gain from PMK		Swing	-6.98%	

=== 2001 ===
2001 Tamil Nadu Legislative Assembly election: Salem – II
Party	Candidate	Votes	%	±%
PMK	Karthe M.	62,306	54.25%	
DMK	A. L. Thangavel	47,221	41.11%	
MDMK	G.Arjunam	2,030	1.77%	
Independent	Sethuraman.K.	797	0.69%	
Independent	Venkatachalam.S.V.	640	0.56%	
BSP	Ponnusamy.V.	497	0.43%	
Margin of victory		15,085	13.13%	−6.25%
Turnout		114,855	60.41%	−7.39%
PMK gain from DMK		Swing	9.42%	

=== 1996 ===
1996 Tamil Nadu Legislative Assembly election: Salem – II
Party	Candidate	Votes	%	±%
DMK	A. L. Thangavel	63,588	44.83%	
AIADMK	S. Semmalai	36,097	25.45%	
AIIC(T)	Mohanraj. R.	10,794	7.61%	
BJP	Vennira Aadai Nirmala (Selvi)	1,997	1.41%	
MDMK	Thamarai Kannan. K.S.V.	1,719	1.21%	
Independent	Krishnan. K.	331	0.23%	
Margin of victory		27,491	19.38%	−18.74%
Turnout		141,856	67.8%	9.51%
DMK gain from AIADMK		Swing	-19.08%	

=== 1991 ===
1991 Tamil Nadu Legislative Assembly election: Salem – II
Party	Candidate	Votes	%	±%
AIADMK	Natesan M.	66,904	63.90%	
DMK	Veerapandi S. Arumugam	26,997	25.79%	
PMK	Manickam K.	9,170	8.76%	
JP	Nallahambi M.M.	417	0.40%	
Independent	Ariyan K.P.	151	0.14%	
Independent	Ramasamy M.	131	0.13%	
Margin of victory		39,907	38.12%	18.19%
Turnout		104,695	58.29%	−8.83%
AIADMK gain from DMK		Swing	20.38%	

=== 1989 ===
1989 Tamil Nadu Legislative Assembly election: Salem – II
Party	Candidate	Votes	%	±%
DMK	Veerapandy S. Arumugam	45,358	43.52%	
AIADMK(JL)	Natesan. M.M	24,593	23.60%	
INC	Rajendran. U.M	22,755	21.83%	
AIADMK(JR)	Rajaram. K.M	10,178	9.77%	
Independent	Murali. M.M	348	0.33%	
Independent	Balakrishnan. K.P.M	208	0.20%	
Margin of victory		20,765	19.92%	11.20%
Turnout		104,220	67.12%	−5.10%
DMK gain from AIADMK		Swing	-10.27%	

=== 1984 ===
1984 Tamil Nadu Legislative Assembly election: Salem – II
Party	Candidate	Votes	%	±%
AIADMK	Arumugam	49,339	53.79%	
DMK	Veerpandi S. Arumugam	41,333	45.07%	
Independent	Thiyagarajan. K.S.	224	0.24%	
Independent	Kandasamy. C.	208	0.23%	
Independent	Jayaprakasam. S.	150	0.16%	
Independent	Palanivel. K.	148	0.16%	
Margin of victory		8,006	8.73%	2.76%
Turnout		91,718	72.22%	7.15%
AIADMK hold		Swing	2.22%	

=== 1980 ===
1980 Tamil Nadu Legislative Assembly election: Salem – II
Party	Candidate	Votes	%	±%
AIADMK	Arumugam. M	40,975	51.57%	
INC	Anbalagan. K	36,235	45.61%	
JP	Solai-Erusan	1,594	2.01%	
Independent	Seerangan. M	446	0.56%	
Independent	Dhanamannar. M	200	0.25%	
Margin of victory		4,740	5.97%	3.13%
Turnout		79,450	65.07%	12.17%
AIADMK gain from JP		Swing	21.21%	

=== 1977 ===
1977 Tamil Nadu Legislative Assembly election: Salem – II
Party	Candidate	Votes	%	±%
JP	M. Arumugam	22,636	30.36%	
DMK	K.A. Thangavelu	20,523	27.53%	
CPI(M)	K.S. Arthanari	19,173	25.71%	
CPI	K.V. Ramaswamy	9,731	13.05%	
Margin of victory		2,113	2.83%	−4.71%
Turnout		74,561	52.9%	−19.00%
JP gain from DMK		Swing	-22.41%	

=== 1971 ===
1971 Tamil Nadu Legislative Assembly election: Salem – II
Party	Candidate	Votes	%	±%
DMK	K. Rajaram	37,152	52.77%	
INC	R.Ramakrishnan	31,844	45.23%	
Independent	S. Natarajan	798	1.13%	
ABJS	S. S.Rama Rao	608	0.86%	
Margin of victory		5,308	7.54%	−9.65%
Turnout		70,402	71.9%	−6.15%
DMK hold		Swing	-5.23%	

=== 1967 ===
1967 Madras Legislative Assembly election: Salem – II
Party	Candidate	Votes	%	±%
DMK	E. R. Krishnan	38,781	58.00%	
INC	A. R. Gounder	27,285	40.81%	
ABJS	S. S. R. Rao	799	1.19%	
Margin of victory		11,496	17.19%	2.61%
Turnout		66,865	78.05%	4.01%
DMK gain from INC		Swing	14.91%	

=== 1962 ===
1962 Madras Legislative Assembly election: Salem – II
Party	Candidate	Votes	%	±%
INC	A.Rathanavel Gounder	28,811	43.09%	
CPI	S.M.Ramiah	19,976	29.88%	
SWA	M.Muthusami	10,935	16.35%	
Independent	M.Chockalingam	852	1.27%	
Margin of victory		8,835	14.59%	−9.51%
Turnout		60,574	74.04%	25.38%
INC hold		Swing	13.54%	

=== 1957 ===
1957 Madras Legislative Assembly election: Salem II
Party	Candidate	Votes	%	±%
INC	A.Rathnavel Gounder	19,755	29.54%	
CPI	S.M.Ramiah	11,023	16.49%	
Independent	Thiruvengadam	2,298	3.44%	
Independent	S.Ariaputhran	2,282	3.41%	
Independent	Rajamanickam	883	1.32%	
Margin of victory		8,732	24.09%	22.18%
Turnout		36,241	48.66%	3.23%
INC hold		Swing	6.73%	

=== 1952 ===
1952 Madras Legislative Assembly election: Salem Rural
Party	Candidate	Votes	%	±%
INC	C.Lakshma Kandan	15,254	22.81%	
TTP	A.Subramaniam	14,575	21.80%	
Independent	Ramanathan Chetty	3,345	5.00%	
Independent	R.Manickam	2,340	3.50%	
Margin of victory		679	1.91%	
Turnout		35,514	45.43%	
INC win (new seat)				
