= P. Mukundhan =

Indian politician (born 1985)

Member of the Tamil Nadu Legislative Assembly
- Incumbent
- Assumed office 11 May 2026
- Preceded by: K. Ashok Kumar
- Constituency: Krishnagiri

Personal details
- Party: Tamilaga Vettri Kazhagam

Pandiyan Mukundhan (born 1985) is an Indian politician from Tamil Nadu. He is a member of the Tamil Nadu Legislative Assembly from the Krishnagiri Assembly constituency in Krishnagiri district, representing the Tamilaga Vettri Kazhagam.

== Early life ==
Mukundhan is from Krishnagiri, Krishnagiri district, Tamil Nadu. He is the son of K. R. Pandiyan. He completed his BA and later did LLB at Bangalore Institute of Legal studies, Bengaluru, in 2007. He his an advocate by profession and also does his own rental business. He declared assets worth Rs.8 crore in his affidavit to the Election Commission of India.

== Career ==
Mukundhan won the Krishnagiri Assembly constituency representing the Tamilaga Vettri Kazhagam in the 2026 Tamil Nadu Legislative Assembly election. He polled 89,374 votes and defeated his nearest rival and sitting MLA, K. Ashok Kumar of the All India Anna Dravida Munnetra Kazhagam, by a margin of 18,844 votes.
