= K. E. Krishnamoorthi =

Indian politician

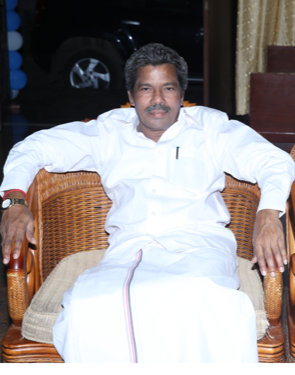

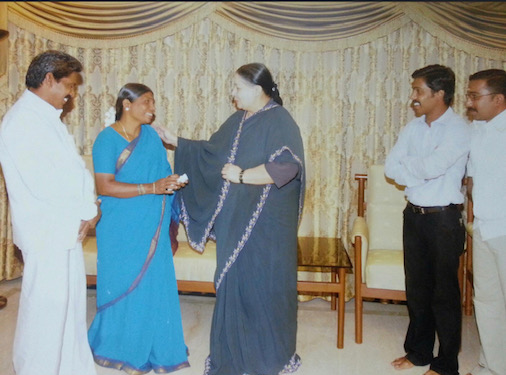

Kommampattu Ellappagounder Krishnamoorthi (Tamil: கே.இ. கிருஷ்ணமூர்த்தி ) is an Indian politician. He served as Member of the Tamil Nadu Legislative Assembly serving the Bargur constituency (2011–2016). He represents the Anna Dravida Munnetra Kazhagam party.

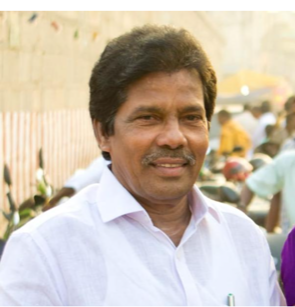

== Early life ==
Krishnamoorthi was born in Kommampattu in Uthangarai taluk, Krishnagiri dt to an agricultural family. He attended school in Periyathallapadi. When he was five years old he lost his father K Ellappagounder. He was raised by his mother K.E Muthuvediammal. Krishnamoorthi has two elder sisters KE Mangai KE Rani.

Krishnamoorthi married K Thangamani in 1974 with whom he raised two sons, KEK Ramesh and KEK Suresh.

== Career ==
He was inspired by MGR Mandram. He started following Mandram while young. After MGR was expelled from DMK, he followed MGR’s political career and he joined ADMK when it formed in 1972. He participated in ADMK's political agenda in Uthangarai. Krishnamoorthi served as a leader of the student wing in 1973 (மாணவரணி தலைவர்) for Harur Constituency. He worked with youngsters on the General Assembly Election in 1977 and 1980.

He held many responsibilities in the AIADMK party, including District Secretary of Dharmapuri, Union Secretary of Uthangarai taluk, Union Chairman of Uthangarai taluk, District Counselor for Uthangarai, Union Counselor for Govindhapuram and Panchayat board President for Govindhapuram.

During the General Assembly election and parliament election in 1980s while MGR was campaigning in Dharmapuri district, Krishnamoorthi and N. Narayanaswamy both were attacking MGRs campaign. They were spotted by MGR in Singarapettai who advised them to drive slowly in front of his convoy until his next meeting at Mathur. MGR followed them to observe how they were driving.

After the 1984 election, he was appreciated by MLA R. Rajamanickam and introduced again to MGR. Later on, Krishnamoorthi was announced as AIADMK Union Secretary for Uthangarai Taluk, in 1984. He served as AIADMK union secretary for almost three decades until he was appointed District Secretary for Dharmapuri in 2007. After MGR's demise in 1987, he followed J. Jayalalitha, was recognized in 1987 and continued as AIADMK Union Secretary for Uthangarai. Krishnamoorthi remained faithful to MGR’s and Jayalalitha’s policies.

=== Achievements ===
He established a statue of MGR in Unthagarai Roundanna in 1987. He was the youngest-ever ADMK union secretary. In the 2006 local body election he won the race for District counselor, beating Venkatachalam (PMK). Because DMK had many alliances, including Congress, two communist parties, PMK, VCK and others, while ADMK was only allied with MDMK.

=== Political career ===
==== Party Responsibilities (AIADMK கழக பொறுப்புகள் ) ====
- 1974 -1981 Leader of Student wing, Harur Constituency (மாணவரணி தலைவர்)
- 1984- 2007 Union Secretary, Uthangarai Taluk (ஒன்றிய கழக செ யலாளர்)
- 1993- 1995 Party Speaker, AIADMK (தலைமை கழக பேச்சாளர்)
- 2007-2009 District Secretary, Dharmapuri (மாவட்ட கழக செயலாளர்)
- 2009 - மாவட்ட இலக்கிய அணி செயலாளர்)

==== General Elections ====
He participated in many elections including local body elections and Assembly elections.

- 1984 - He was elected as a panchayat board president (Govindhapuram Panchayat)
- 1997 - He was elected as a union counselor (Govindhapuram Panchayat)
- 1997 - He was elected as a union chairman (Uthangarai Taluk)
- 2006 – He was elected as district counselor (Unthagarai North)
- 2011 – He was elected as a MLA (Bargur Constituency)
