= Bargur Assembly constituency =

State Legislative Assembly Constituency in Tamil Nadu

Coordinates: 12.55°N 78.37°E

Bargur
- Constituency No. 52 for the Tamil Nadu Legislative Assembly

Constituency details
- Country: India
- Region: South India
- State: Tamil Nadu
- District: Krishnagiri
- Lok Sabha constituency: Krishnagiri
- Established: 1977
- Total electors: 2,40,476
- Reservation: None

Member of Legislative Assembly
- 17th Tamil Nadu Legislative Assembly
- Incumbent E. C. Govindarasan
- Party: AIADMK
- Alliance: NDA
- Elected year: 2026

Bargur is a state assembly constituency in Krishnagiri district in Tamil Nadu, India. Its State Assembly Constituency number is 52. It comprises portions of Krishnagiri and Pochampalli taluks and is a part of Krishnagiri Lok Sabha constituency for national elections to the Parliament of India. Most successful party: AIADMK (nine times). It is one of the 234 State Legislative Assembly Constituencies in Tamil Nadu, in India. Former chief minister Jayalalithaa contested twice in this constituency, won in 1991 and lost in 1996.

== Members of Legislative Assembly ==
| Year | Member | Political party |
|---|---|---|
| 1977 | H. G. Arumugam | All India Anna Dravida Munnetra Kazhagam |
| 1980 | B. N. S. Doraisamy | All India Anna Dravida Munnetra Kazhagam |
| 1984 | T. M. Venkatachalam | All India Anna Dravida Munnetra Kazhagam |
| 1989 | K. R. Rajendran | All India Anna Dravida Munnetra Kazhagam |
| 1991 | J. Jayalalithaa | All India Anna Dravida Munnetra Kazhagam |
| 1996 | E. G. Sugavanam | Dravida Munnetra Kazhagam |
| 2001 | M. Thambidurai | All India Anna Dravida Munnetra Kazhagam |
| 2006 | M. Thambidurai | All India Anna Dravida Munnetra Kazhagam |
| 2009^ | K. R. K. Narasiman | Dravida Munnetra Kazhagam |
| 2011 | K. E. Krishnamoorthi | All India Anna Dravida Munnetra Kazhagam |
| 2016 | V. Rajendran | All India Anna Dravida Munnetra Kazhagam |
| 2021 | D. Mathiazhagan | Dravida Munnetra Kazhagam |
| 2026 | E. C. Govindarasan | All India Anna Dravida Munnetra Kazhagam |

== Election results ==
Vote share of winning candidates
| 2026 | 33.30% |
| 2021 | 49.06% |
| 2016 | 42.89% |
| 2011 | 56.02% |
| 2009 by-election | 0.0% |
| 2006 | 42.67% |
| 2001 | 66.31% |
| 1996 | 50.71% |
| 1991 | 65.18% |
| 1989 | 30.27% |
| 1984 | 69.71% |
| 1980 | 57.26% |
| 1977 | 48.94% |

=== Assembly election 2026 ===
2026 Tamil Nadu Legislative Assembly election : Bargur
| Party | Candidate | Votes | % | ±% |
|---|---|---|---|---|
| AIADMK | E. C. Govindarasan | 71,240 | 33.30% | New |
| TVK | E. Muralidharan | 66,999 | 31.31% | New |
| DMK | D. Mathiazhagan | 65,228 | 30.49% | ▼19.06 |
| NTK | Kavinkumar. S | 5,462 | 2.55% | ▼2.60 |
| NOTA | None of the above | 631 | 0.29% | ▼0.48 |
| Margin of victory | | 4,241 | 1.98% | ▼4.45 |
| Turnout | | 214,129 | 89.04% | ▲9.22 |
| Total valid votes | | 213,960 | | |
| Registered electors | | 240,476 | | ▼3.16 |
| AIADMK gain from DMK | | Swing | ▼16.25 | |

=== Assembly election 2021 ===
2021 Tamil Nadu Legislative Assembly election : Bargur
| Party | Candidate | Votes | % | ±% |
|---|---|---|---|---|
| DMK | D. Mathiazhagan | 97,256 | 49.55% | ▲7.19 |
| AIADMK | A. Krishnan | 84,642 | 43.13% | ▲0.24 |
| NTK | K. Karunakaran | 10,116 | 5.15% | ▲4.79 |
| NOTA | None of the above | 1,518 | 0.77% | ▲0.04 |
| Margin of victory | | 12,614 | 6.43% | ▲5.91 |
| Turnout | | 198,221 | 79.82% | ▼2.37 |
| Total valid votes | | 196,266 | | |
| Rejected ballots | | 437 | 0.22% | ▲0.19 |
| Registered electors | | 248,335 | | ▲8.49 |
| DMK gain from AIADMK | | Swing | ▲6.66 | |

=== Assembly election 2016 ===
2016 Tamil Nadu Legislative Assembly election : Bargur
| Party | Candidate | Votes | % | ±% |
|---|---|---|---|---|
| AIADMK | V. Rajendran | 80,650 | 42.89% | ▼13.13 |
| DMK | E. C. Govindarasan | 79,668 | 42.36% | New |
| PMK | A. Kumar | 18,407 | 9.79% | ▼27.64 |
| TMC(M) | R. Rajendran | 2,948 | 1.57% | New |
| NOTA | None of the above | 1,382 | 0.73% | New |
| BJP | R. Manivannan | 1,273 | 0.68% | ▼0.78 |
| Margin of victory | | 982 | 0.52% | ▼18.07 |
| Turnout | | 188,117 | 82.19% | ▲0.33 |
| Total valid votes | | 188,056 | | |
| Rejected ballots | | 61 | 0.03% | ▼0.01 |
| Registered electors | | 228,893 | | ▲18.27 |
| AIADMK hold | | Swing | | |

=== Assembly election 2011 ===
2011 Tamil Nadu Legislative Assembly election : Bargur
| Party | Candidate | Votes | % | ±% |
|---|---|---|---|---|
| AIADMK | K. E. Krishnamoorthi | 88,711 | 56.02% | New |
| PMK | T. K. Raja | 59,271 | 37.43% | New |
| BJP | K. Asokan | 2,314 | 1.46% | ▲0.33 |
| Ulzaipali Makkal Katchy | K. Venkatesan | 1,611 | 1.02% | New |
| Independent | C. Vijayakumar | 1,512 | 0.95% | |
| Independent | K. Sakthivel | 1,307 | 0.83% | |
| Independent | C. Krishnamoorthy | 1,279 | 0.81% | |
| Independent | R. Govindaraj | 1,106 | 0.70% | |
| Margin of victory | | 29,440 | 18.59% | ▼26.55 |
| Turnout | | 158,420 | 81.86% | ▲10.60 |
| Total valid votes | | 158,363 | | |
| Rejected ballots | | 57 | 0.04% | ▲0.04 |
| Registered electors | | 193,531 | | ▲5.32 |
| AIADMK gain from DMK | | Swing | ▼12.32 | |

=== Assembly by-election 2009 ===
2009 Tamil Nadu Legislative Assembly by-election : Bargur
| Party | Candidate | Votes | % | ±% |
|---|---|---|---|---|
| DMK | K. R. K. Narasiman | 89,481 | 68.34% | ▲27.90 |
| Independent | V. Chandran | 30,378 | 23.20% | |
| Independent | Rajesh. E | 3,482 | 2.66% | |
| Independent | Elango Siva. | 1,958 | 1.50% | |
| CPI | Kannu. S | 1,640 | 1.25% | New |
| BJP | K. Asokan | 1,482 | 1.13% | ▲0.66 |
| Independent | Mageswari. K | 946 | 0.72% | |
| Independent | Radmanrajan Dr. | 852 | 0.65% | |
| Margin of victory | | 59,103 | 45.14% | ▲42.91 |
| Turnout | | 130,942 | 71.26% | ▼1.34 |
| Total valid votes | | 130,940 | | |
| Registered electors | | 183,756 | | ▼7.14 |
| DMK gain from AIADMK | | Swing | ▲25.67 | |

=== Assembly election 2006 ===
2006 Tamil Nadu Legislative Assembly election : Bargur
| Party | Candidate | Votes | % | ±% |
|---|---|---|---|---|
| AIADMK | M. Thambidurai | 61,299 | 42.67% | New |
| DMK | V. Vetriselvan | 58,091 | 40.44% | ▲13.98 |
| DMDK | K. V. Govindaraj | 11,157 | 7.77% | New |
| Independent | C. Narayanasamy | 5,666 | 3.94% | |
| NCP | R. Mani | 2,519 | 1.75% | New |
| Independent | K. Venkatesan | 1,460 | 1.02% | |
| Independent | R. Saravanan | 987 | 0.69% | |
| Margin of victory | | 3,208 | 2.23% | ▼37.62 |
| Turnout | | 143,663 | 72.60% | ▲9.50 |
| Total valid votes | | 143,663 | | |
| Registered electors | | 197,892 | | ▲0.93 |
| AIADMK gain from AIADMK | | Swing | ▼23.64 | |

=== Assembly election 2001 ===
2001 Tamil Nadu Legislative Assembly election : Bargur
| Party | Candidate | Votes | % | ±% |
|---|---|---|---|---|
| AIADMK | M. Thambidurai | 82,039 | 66.31% | ▲22.77 |
| DMK | E. G. Sugavanam | 32,733 | 26.46% | ▼24.25 |
| MDMK | Pon. Gunasekaran | 3,476 | 2.81% | ▲2.03 |
| Independent | S. Elango | 3,047 | 2.46% | |
| Independent | Ra. Chennayan Alias Chenrayan | 1,459 | 1.18% | |
| Independent | R. Govindaraj | 962 | 0.78% | |
| Margin of victory | | 49,306 | 39.85% | ▲32.68 |
| Turnout | | 123,716 | 63.10% | ▼5.97 |
| Total valid votes | | 123,716 | | |
| Registered electors | | 196,078 | | ▲8.92 |
| AIADMK gain from DMK | | Swing | ▲15.60 | |

=== Assembly election 1996 ===
1996 Tamil Nadu Legislative Assembly election : Bargur
| Party | Candidate | Votes | % | ±% |
|---|---|---|---|---|
| DMK | E. G. Sugavanam | 59,148 | 50.71% | ▲49.45 |
| AIADMK | J. Jayalalithaa | 50,782 | 43.54% | New |
| PMK | E. P. Ramalingam | 2,352 | 2.02% | ▲0.27 |
| MDMK | K. Viswanathan | 912 | 0.78% | New |
| BJP | P. Madhavan | 912 | 0.78% | ▲0.33 |
| Margin of victory | | 8,366 | 7.17% | ▼28.67 |
| Turnout | | 124,346 | 69.07% | ▼0.23 |
| Total valid votes | | 116,643 | | |
| Rejected ballots | | 7,828 | 6.30% | ▲1.15 |
| Registered electors | | 180,024 | | ▲13.95 |
| DMK gain from AIADMK | | Swing | ▼14.47 | |

=== Assembly election 1991 ===
1991 Tamil Nadu Legislative Assembly election : Bargur
| Party | Candidate | Votes | % | ±% |
|---|---|---|---|---|
| AIADMK | J. Jayalalithaa | 67,680 | 65.18% | New |
| Thayaga Marumalarchi Kazhagam | T. Rajendar | 30,465 | 29.34% | New |
| PMK | A. C. Chinnasamy | 1,815 | 1.75% | New |
| DMK | E. G. Sugavanam | 1,311 | 1.26% | ▼27.99 |
| Margin of victory | | 37,215 | 35.84% | ▲34.82 |
| Turnout | | 109,478 | 69.30% | ▼2.87 |
| Total valid votes | | 103,841 | | |
| Rejected ballots | | 5,637 | 5.15% | ▲2.56 |
| Registered electors | | 157,980 | | ▲10.04 |
| AIADMK gain from AIADMK | | Swing | ▲34.91 | |

=== Assembly election 1989 ===
1989 Tamil Nadu Legislative Assembly election : Bargur
| Party | Candidate | Votes | % | ±% |
|---|---|---|---|---|
| AIADMK | K. R. Rajendran | 30,551 | 30.27% | New |
| DMK | E. G. Sugavanam | 29,522 | 29.25% | ▼0.61 |
| INC | M. Raman | 20,906 | 20.72% | New |
| AIADMK | D. Udhayakumar | 17,338 | 17.18% | New |
| Independent | V. Chandran | 1,081 | 1.07% | |
| Independent | Ismail | 636 | 0.63% | |
| Margin of victory | | 1,029 | 1.02% | ▼38.84 |
| Turnout | | 103,604 | 72.17% | ▲1.00 |
| Total valid votes | | 100,921 | | |
| Rejected ballots | | 2,683 | 2.59% | ▼2.93 |
| Registered electors | | 143,564 | | ▲17.26 |
| AIADMK gain from AIADMK | | Swing | ▼39.44 | |

=== Assembly election 1984 ===
1984 Tamil Nadu Legislative Assembly election : Bargur
| Party | Candidate | Votes | % | ±% |
|---|---|---|---|---|
| AIADMK | T. M. Venkatachalam | 57,388 | 69.71% | ▲12.45 |
| DMK | P. V. Veeramani | 24,577 | 29.86% | ▼11.83 |
| Margin of victory | | 32,811 | 39.86% | ▲24.29 |
| Turnout | | 87,134 | 71.17% | ▲8.64 |
| Total valid votes | | 82,321 | | |
| Rejected ballots | | 4,813 | 5.52% | ▲4.02 |
| Registered electors | | 122,427 | | ▲8.24 |
| AIADMK hold | | Swing | | |

=== Assembly election 1980 ===
1980 Tamil Nadu Legislative Assembly election : Bargur
| Party | Candidate | Votes | % | ±% |
|---|---|---|---|---|
| AIADMK | B. N. S. Doraisamy | 39,893 | 57.26% | New |
| DMK | K. Murugesan | 29,045 | 41.69% | ▲15.50 |
| Independent | V. Periasamy | 727 | 1.04% | |
| Margin of victory | | 10,848 | 15.57% | ▼7.18 |
| Turnout | | 70,728 | 62.53% | ▲1.48 |
| Total valid votes | | 69,665 | | |
| Rejected ballots | | 1,063 | 1.50% | ▼0.16 |
| Registered electors | | 113,106 | | ▲15.34 |
| AIADMK gain from AIADMK | | Swing | ▲8.32 | |

=== Assembly election 1977 ===
1977 Tamil Nadu Legislative Assembly election : Bargur
| Party | Candidate | Votes | % | ±% |
|---|---|---|---|---|
| AIADMK | H. G. Arumugam | 28,812 | 48.94% | New |
| DMK | V. C. Thimmarayan | 15,420 | 26.19% | New |
| INC | T. Chinnaraju | 8,599 | 14.61% | New |
| JP | G. Sugadev | 6,036 | 10.25% | New |
| Margin of victory | | 13,392 | 22.75% | |
| Turnout | | 59,862 | 61.05% | |
| Total valid votes | | 58,867 | | |
| Rejected ballots | | 995 | 1.66% | |
| Registered electors | | 98,061 | | |
| AIADMK win (new seat) | | | | |
