= T. M. Tamilselvam =

Indian politician

T. M. Tamilselvan

Member of the Tamil Nadu Legislative Assembly
- In office 12 May 2021 – 6 May 2026
- Preceded by: Manoranjitham Nagaraj
- Succeeded by: N. Elaiyaraja
- Constituency: Uthangarai

Personal details
- Party: All India Anna Dravida Munnetra Kazhagam
- Parent: Manickam (father)
- Occupation: Politician

T. Manickam Tamilselvam is an Indian politician. He is a member of the All India Anna Dravida Munnetra Kazhagam party. He was elected as a member of Tamil Nadu Legislative Assembly from Uthangarai Constituency in May 2021.

== Electoral performance ==
2021 Tamil Nadu Legislative Assembly election: Uthangarai
Party	Candidate	Votes	%	±%
AIADMK	T. M. Tamilselvam	99,675	52.96%	+14.21
INC	S. Arumugam	71,288	37.87%	New
NTK	Elangovan	10,424	5.54%	New
DMDK	R. Bakyaraj	2,291	1.22%	New
NOTA	NOTA	1,359	0.72%	−0.23
MNM	K. Murugesan	1,254	0.67%	New
Margin of victory		28,387	15.08%	13.63%
Turnout		188,223	79.15%	−3.45%
Rejected ballots		214	0.11%	
Registered electors		237,810		
AIADMK hold		Swing	14.21%	
