= Krishnagiri Assembly constituency =

State Legislative Assembly Constituency in Tamil Nadu

Coordinates: 12.53°N 78.23°E

Krishnagiri
- Constituency No. 53 for the Tamil Nadu Legislative Assembly

Constituency details
- Country: India
- Region: South India
- State: Tamil Nadu
- District: Krishnagiri
- Lok Sabha constituency: Krishnagiri
- Established: 1951
- Total electors: 2,69,394
- Reservation: None

Member of Legislative Assembly
- 17th Tamil Nadu Legislative Assembly
- Incumbent P. Mukundhan
- Party: TVK
- Elected year: 2026

Krishnagiri is a state assembly constituency in Tamil Nadu, India. Its State Assembly Constituency number is 53. It is a part of the similarly named constituency for national elections to the Parliament of India. This constituency is delimited in the year 2008. It is one of the 234 State Legislative Assembly Constituencies in Tamil Nadu in India.

Krishnagiri was one of 17 assembly constituencies to have VVPAT facility with EVMs in the 2016 Tamil Nadu Legislative Assembly election.

It comprises the following areas.

- Krishnagiri Taluk (Part) - Polupalli, Kurubarapalli, Ragimaganapalli, Junjupalli, Byanapalli, Kothapetta, Kattinayanapalli, Kammaampalli, Boganapalli, Pethathalapalli, Gangaleri, Kondepalli, Kompalli, Sembadamuthur, Gooliam, Bellampalli, Chikkapoovathi, Thandegoundanahalli, Alapatti, Agaram, Marikkampalli, Bellarampalli, Periyamuthur, Devasamudiram, Agasipalli, Chowttahalli, Sundekuppam, Timmapuram, Katteri, Gundalapatti, Sokkadi, Velakalahalli, Chaparthi, Bannihalli, Mittahalli, Errahalli, Kaveripattinam, Paiyur, Jagadab, Kallukurukki and Karadihalli villages.
- Krishnagiri Municipality & Kattiganapalli
- Kaveripattinam Town Panchayat

== Members of Legislative Assembly ==
=== Madras State ===
Year	Winner	Party
1952	D. Krishna Moorthy Gounder	Independent
1957	S. Nagaraja Manigar	Indian National Congress
1962	Sreeramulu	Dravida Munnetra Kazhagam
1967	P. M. M. Gounder	Indian National Congress

=== Tamil Nadu ===
Year	Winner	Party
1971	C. Maniappan	Dravida Munnetra Kazhagam
1977	K. R. Chinnarasu	All India Anna Dravida Munnetra Kazhagam
1980	K. R. Chinnarasu	All India Anna Dravida Munnetra Kazhagam
1984	K. R. Chinnarasu	All India Anna Dravida Munnetra Kazhagam
1989	K. Kanchana	Dravida Munnetra Kazhagam
1991	K. Munivenkatappan	All India Anna Dravida Munnetra Kazhagam
1996	Kanchana Kamalanathan	Dravida Munnetra Kazhagam
2001	V. Govindarasu	All India Anna Dravida Munnetra Kazhagam
2006	T. Senguttuvan	Dravida Munnetra Kazhagam
2011	K. P. Munusamy	All India Anna Dravida Munnetra Kazhagam
2016	T. Senguttuvan	Dravida Munnetra Kazhagam
2021	K. Ashok Kumar	All India Anna Dravida Munnetra Kazhagam
2026	P. Mukundhan	Tamilaga Vettri Kazhagam

== Election results ==
Vote share of winning candidates
2026	38.83%
2021	45.38%
2016	43.80%
2011	55.98%
2006	49.24%
2001	56.59%
1996	64.11%
1991	69.92%
1989	39.28%
1984	54.83%
1980	49.75%
1977	32.66%
1971	63.00%
1967	47.31%
1962	58.47%
1957	66.24%
1952	41.27%

=== 2026 ===
2026 Tamil Nadu Legislative Assembly election: Krishnagiri
Party	Candidate	Votes	%	±%
TVK	P. Mukundhan	89,374	38.83	New
AIADMK	K. Ashok Kumar	70,530	30.64	▼14.74
INC	A. Chellakumar	59,597	25.89	New
NTK	Suganthi	6,398	2.78	▼2.48
NOTA	NOTA	1,136	0.49	▼0.38
Margin of victory		18,844	8.19	▲7.81
Turnout		2,30,181	85.44	▲5.92
Registered electors		2,69,394		▲3,227
TVK gain from AIADMK		Swing	New	

=== 2021 ===
2021 Tamil Nadu Legislative Assembly election: Krishnagiri
Party	Candidate	Votes	%	±%
AIADMK	K. Ashok Kumar	96,050	45.38%	+4.03
DMK	T. Senguttuvan	95,256	45.01%	+1.21
NTK	V. Nirandari	11,137	5.26%	New
MNM	R. K. Ravishankar	3,455	1.63%	New
NOTA	NOTA	1,837	0.87%	−0.06
NCP	K. M. Chandramohan	1,088	0.51%	New
Margin of victory		794	0.38%	−2.07%
Turnout		211,648	79.52%	−0.88%
Rejected ballots		605	0.29%	
Registered electors		266,167		
AIADMK gain from DMK		Swing	1.58%	

=== 2016 ===
2016 Tamil Nadu Legislative Assembly election: Krishnagiri
Party	Candidate	Votes	%	±%
DMK	T. Senguttuvan	87,637	43.80%	New
AIADMK	V. Govindaraj	82,746	41.35%	−14.62
PMK	S. Kumar	15,736	7.86%	New
TMC(M)	R. Jayaprakash	4,199	2.10%	New
NOTA	NOTA	1,855	0.93%	New
Independent	Manager	1,195	0.60%	New
NCP	K. M. Chandramohan	1,151	0.58%	New
Independent	G. Latha	1,082	0.54%	New
Margin of victory		4,891	2.44%	−15.70%
Turnout		200,092	80.40%	0.97%
Registered electors		248,873		
DMK gain from AIADMK		Swing	-12.18%	

=== 2011 ===
2011 Tamil Nadu Legislative Assembly election: Krishnagiri
Party	Candidate	Votes	%	±%
AIADMK	K. P. Munusamy	89,776	55.98%	+19.71
INC	Syed Ghiyas Ul Haq	60,679	37.83%	New
BJP	Kotteswaran	3,025	1.89%	+1.31
Ulzaipali Makkal Katchy	R. Raja.	2,357	1.47%	New
Independent	G. Latha	1,561	0.97%	New
Margin of victory		29,097	18.14%	5.17%
Turnout		160,379	79.42%	8.26%
Registered electors		201,926		
AIADMK gain from DMK		Swing	6.74%	

=== 2006 ===
2006 Tamil Nadu Legislative Assembly election: Krishnagiri
Party	Candidate	Votes	%	±%
DMK	T. Senguttuvan	69,068	49.24%	+11.55
AIADMK	V. Govindaraj	50,873	36.27%	−20.33
DMDK	R. Govindaraj	10,894	7.77%	New
NCP	P. Davit	1,913	1.36%	New
Independent	V. Raju	1,841	1.31%	New
BSP	C. Abimannan	1,672	1.19%	New
Independent	S. Ramesh	1,100	0.78%	New
Independent	C. Chennaiyan	938	0.67%	New
BJP	S. Munavaribegum	812	0.58%	New
Margin of victory		18,195	12.97%	−5.93%
Turnout		140,271	71.17%	11.66%
Registered electors		197,095		
DMK gain from AIADMK		Swing	-7.35%	

=== 2001 ===
2001 Tamil Nadu Legislative Assembly election: Krishnagiri
Party	Candidate	Votes	%	±%
AIADMK	V. Govindarasu	65,197	56.59%	+26.13
DMK	T. Senguttuvan	43,424	37.69%	−26.42
Independent	P. Jayaseelan	2,861	2.48%	New
MDMK	K. R. Pandian	2,093	1.82%	+0.07
Independent	M. Krishnamurthy	938	0.81%	New
Independent	M. Arumugasubramani	690	0.60%	New
Margin of victory		21,773	18.90%	−14.75%
Turnout		115,203	59.51%	−5.33%
Registered electors		193,656		
AIADMK gain from DMK		Swing	-7.52%	

=== 1996 ===
1996 Tamil Nadu Legislative Assembly election: Krishnagiri
Party	Candidate	Votes	%	±%
DMK	Kanchana Kamalanathan	67,849	64.11%	+38.04
AIADMK	K. P. Kathavarayan	32,238	30.46%	−39.46
MDMK	K. R. Pandiyan	1,850	1.75%	New
AIIC(T)	C. R. Thirupathi	1,182	1.12%	New
Independent	Y. Sathiq	592	0.56%	New
Independent	R. Seshagiri	535	0.51%	New
Margin of victory		35,611	33.65%	−10.20%
Turnout		105,829	64.84%	2.58%
Registered electors		173,839		
DMK gain from AIADMK		Swing	-5.81%	

=== 1991 ===
1991 Tamil Nadu Legislative Assembly election: Krishnagiri
Party	Candidate	Votes	%	±%
AIADMK	K. Munivektatappan	63,729	69.92%	+46.32
DMK	T. H. Musta Ahmed	23,761	26.07%	−13.21
BJP	M. Ammal Rukkumani	1,511	1.66%	New
PMK	K. C. Kanmani	991	1.09%	New
JP	S. Ravi	603	0.66%	New
Independent	M. Murugesan	550	0.60%	New
Margin of victory		39,968	43.85%	28.17%
Turnout		91,145	62.26%	−6.05%
Registered electors		155,585		
AIADMK gain from DMK		Swing	30.64%	

=== 1989 ===
1989 Tamil Nadu Legislative Assembly election: Krishnagiri
Party	Candidate	Votes	%	±%
DMK	Kanchana Kamalanathan	35,042	39.28%	−0.67
AIADMK	K. C. Krishnan	21,056	23.60%	−31.23
INC	Barakath-Un-Nisa	20,663	23.16%	New
AIADMK	K. R. Chinnarasu	9,331	10.46%	−44.37
Independent	J. C. Krishnappa	1,854	2.08%	New
Margin of victory		13,986	15.68%	0.80%
Turnout		89,208	68.31%	−0.38%
Registered electors		136,299		
DMK gain from AIADMK		Swing	-15.55%	

=== 1984 ===
1984 Tamil Nadu Legislative Assembly election: Krishnagiri
Party	Candidate	Votes	%	±%
AIADMK	K. R. Chinnarasu	40,585	54.83%	+5.09
DMK	Kanchana Kamalanathan	29,570	39.95%	−6.6
Independent	K. O. Periyannan	2,676	3.62%	New
Independent	K. Angappan	574	0.78%	New
Margin of victory		11,015	14.88%	11.69%
Turnout		74,017	68.69%	14.43%
Registered electors		116,726		
AIADMK hold		Swing	5.09%	

=== 1980 ===
1980 Tamil Nadu Legislative Assembly election: Krishnagiri
Party	Candidate	Votes	%	±%
AIADMK	K. R. Chinnarasu	28,020	49.75%	+17.09
DMK	M. Kamalanathan	26,223	46.55%	+28.63
JP	S. Krishnamurthy	1,901	3.37%	New
Margin of victory		1,797	3.19%	−5.77%
Turnout		56,327	54.26%	−3.42%
Registered electors		106,266		
AIADMK hold		Swing	17.09%	

=== 1977 ===
1977 Tamil Nadu Legislative Assembly election: Krishnagiri
Party	Candidate	Votes	%	±%
AIADMK	K. R. Chinnarasu	17,178	32.66%	New
JP	T. M. Thiruppathy	12,466	23.70%	New
INC	P. M. Muniswamy Gounder	11,667	22.18%	−14.82
DMK	M. M. Karamathullah	9,429	17.93%	−45.07
Independent	C. Munnuswamy	1,860	3.54%	New
Margin of victory		4,712	8.96%	−17.03%
Turnout		52,600	57.68%	−3.33%
Registered electors		93,875		
AIADMK gain from DMK		Swing	-30.34%	

=== 1971 ===
1971 Tamil Nadu Legislative Assembly election: Krishnagiri
Party	Candidate	Votes	%	±%
DMK	C. Manniappan	31,445	63.00%	+16.05
INC	T. G. Selvaraj	18,471	37.00%	−10.31
Margin of victory		12,974	25.99%	25.63%
Turnout		49,916	61.01%	−7.09%
Registered electors		88,479		
DMK gain from INC		Swing	15.68%	

=== 1967 ===
1967 Madras Legislative Assembly election: Krishnagiri
Party	Candidate	Votes	%	±%
INC	P. M. M. Gounder	24,220	47.31%	+5.78
DMK	C. Manniappan	24,035	46.95%	−11.52
Independent	P. Chetti	2,937	5.74%	New
Margin of victory		185	0.36%	−16.58%
Turnout		51,192	68.10%	−0.12%
Registered electors		79,748		
INC gain from DMK		Swing	-11.16%	

=== 1962 ===
1962 Madras Legislative Assembly election: Krishnagiri
Party	Candidate	Votes	%	±%
DMK	Sreeramulu	38,833	58.47%	New
INC	P. M. Munisamy Goundar	27,583	41.53%	−24.71
Margin of victory		11,250	16.94%	−21.73%
Turnout		66,416	68.21%	31.95%
Registered electors		101,069		
DMK gain from INC		Swing	-7.77%	

=== 1957 ===
1957 Madras Legislative Assembly election: Krishnagiri
Party	Candidate	Votes	%	±%
INC	S. Nagaraja Manigar	23,182	66.24%	+30.1
Independent	N. Mohan Ram	9,649	27.57%	New
Independent	M. N. Subharaman	2,166	6.19%	New
Margin of victory		13,533	38.67%	33.54%
Turnout		34,997	36.26%	−12.88%
Registered electors		96,518		
INC gain from Independent		Swing	24.97%	

=== 1952 ===
1952 Madras Legislative Assembly election: Krishnagiri
Party	Candidate	Votes	%	±%
Independent	D. Krishna Moorthy Gounder	14,639	41.27%	New
INC	S. Nagaraia Maniar	12,820	36.14%	New
CPI	N. Annaji	8,016	22.60%	New
Margin of victory		1,819	5.13%	
Turnout		35,475	49.14%	
Registered electors		72,197		
Independent win (new seat)				
