= Veppanahalli Assembly constituency =

State Legislative Assembly Constituency in Tamil Nadu

Coordinates: 12°42′08″N 78°11′34″E

Veppanahalli
- Constituency No. 54 for the Tamil Nadu Legislative Assembly

Constituency details
- Country: India
- Region: South India
- State: Tamil Nadu
- District: Krishnagiri
- Lok Sabha constituency: Krishnagiri
- Established: 2008
- Total electors: 2,46,739

Member of Legislative Assembly
- 17th Tamil Nadu Legislative Assembly
- Incumbent P. S. Srinivasan
- Party: DMK
- Alliance: SPA
- Elected year: 2026

Veppanahalli is a state assembly constituency of Tamil Nadu, India, that was formed after constituency delimitation in 2008. Its State Assembly Constituency number is 54. Located in Krishnagiri district, it comprises portions of Hosur, Denkanikottai, and Krishnagiri taluks. The constituency is part of Krishnagiri Lok Sabha constituency for elections to the Parliament of India. It is one of the 234 State Legislative Assembly Constituencies in Tamil Nadu in India.

== Members of the Legislative Assembly ==
Year	Winner	Party
2011	T. Senguttuvan	Dravida Munnetra Kazhagam
2016	P. Murugan	Dravida Munnetra Kazhagam
2021	K. P. Munusamy	All India Anna Dravida Munnetra Kazhagam
2026	P. S. Srinivasan	Dravida Munnetra Kazhagam

== Election results ==
Vote share of winning candidates
2026	33.55%
2021	45.87%
2016	46.01%
2011	45.09%

=== 2026 ===
2026 Tamil Nadu Legislative Assembly election: Veppanahalli
Party	Candidate	Votes	%	±%
DMK	P. S. Srinivasan	74,691	33.55	▼10.83
AIADMK	K. P. Munusamy	74,553	33.49	▼12.38
TVK	S. R. Sampangi	63,907	28.71	New
NTK	R. Nagaraj	4,519	2.03	▼2.02
NOTA	NOTA	1,570	0.71	▼0.10
Margin of victory		138	0.06	▼1.43
Turnout		2,22,608	90.22	▲8.60
Registered electors		2,46,739		▼4,607
DMK gain from AIADMK		Swing	▼10.83	

=== 2021 ===
2021 Tamil Nadu Legislative Assembly election: Veppanahalli
Party	Candidate	Votes	%	±%
AIADMK	K. P. Munusamy	94,104	45.87	+2.57
DMK	P. Murugan	91,050	44.38	−1.63
NTK	M. Sakthivel	8,310	4.05	New
DMDK	S. M. Murugesan	3,601	1.76	−0.65
Independent	Abdul Azeez Amanullah	3,022	1.47	New
NOTA	NOTA	1,662	0.81	+0.04
Margin of victory		3,054	1.49	−1.22
Turnout		205,141	81.62	−3.12
Rejected ballots		322	0.16	
Registered electors		251,346		
AIADMK gain from DMK		Swing	-0.14	

=== 2016 ===
2016 Tamil Nadu Legislative Assembly election: Veppanahalli
Party	Candidate	Votes	%	±%
DMK	P. Murugan	88,952	46.01	+0.92
AIADMK	A. V. M. Madhu @ M. Hemnath	83,724	43.31	New
PMK	M. Tamil Selvi	5,476	2.83	New
DMDK	N. Nagaraj	4,656	2.41	−37.89
BJP	V. S. Premanathan	1,966	1.02	−2.16
NOTA	NOTA	1,482	0.77	New
FDLP	S. B. Abbas Ali	1,373	0.71	New
Margin of victory		5,228	2.70	−2.09
Turnout		193,325	84.74	−0.60
Registered electors		228,145		
DMK hold		Swing	0.92	

=== 2011 ===
2011 Tamil Nadu Legislative Assembly election: Veppanahalli
Party	Candidate	Votes	%	±%
DMK	T. Senguttuvan	71,471	45.09	New
DMDK	Kandan @ S. M. Murugesan	63,867	40.29	New
Ulzaipali Makkal Katchy	V. Ranganathan	8,943	5.64	New
BJP	V. S. Premanathan	5,035	3.18	New
Independent	N. V. Kalyani	4,766	3.01	New
BSP	C. L. Surya Prakash	2,732	1.72	New
Independent	S. B. Abbas	1,690	1.07	New
Margin of victory		7,604	4.80	
Turnout		158,504	85.33	
Registered electors		185,746		
DMK win (new seat)				
