= A. L. Thangavel =

Indian politician

A. L. Thangavel is an Indian politician and was a Member of the Legislative Assembly of Tamil Nadu. He was elected to the Tamil Nadu legislative assembly as a Dravida Munnetra Kazhagam candidate from Salem-II constituency in the 1996 election.
