= S. R. Raja =

Indian politician

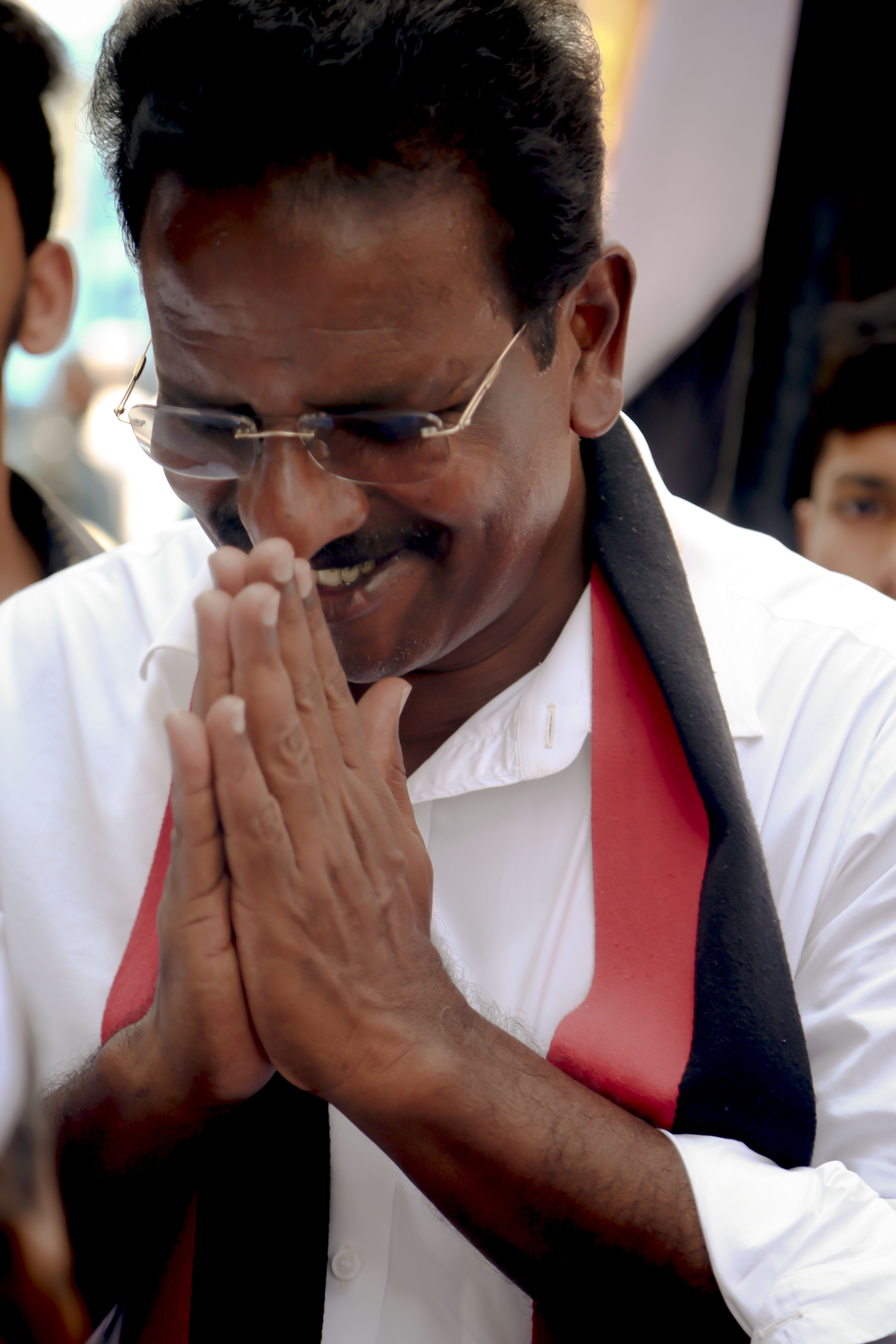

Member of Tamil Nadu Legislative Assembly for Tambaram
- In office 25 May 2016 – 5 May 2026
- Preceded by: T. K. M. Chinnayya
- Succeeded by: D. Sarathkumar

Personal details
- Party: Dravida Munnetra Kazhagam
- Spouse: R. Nithiyakalyani

S. Raghunathan Raja is an Indian politician of Tamil Nadu. He was elected as the Tamil Nadu Member of the legislative assembly from Tambaram constituency as a Dravida Munnetra Kazhagam candidate in the 2016 Tamil Nadu Legislative Assembly election and 2006 Tamil Nadu Legislative Assembly election. He lost the Tambaram constituency to T. K. M. Chinnayya. in the 2011 election, but won back in the 2016 election. Raja, a sitting MLA was dropped as the party's official candidate for the 2026 election

== Electoral performance ==
2021 Tamil Nadu Legislative Assembly election: Tambaram
Party	Candidate	Votes	%	±%
DMK	S. R. Raja	116,840	46.93%	+3.66
AIADMK	T. K. M. Chinnayya	80,016	32.14%	−4.99
MNM	Elango Siva	22,530	9.05%	New
NTK	T. Sureshkumar	19,494	7.83%	+5.6
AMMK	M. Karikalan	4,207	1.69%	New
NOTA	NOTA	2,284	0.92%	−1.21
Tamil Nadu Ilangyar Katchi	P. A. Abdulnazar	1,351	0.54%	New
Margin of victory		36,824	14.79%	8.65%
Turnout		248,968	59.92%	−1.79%
Rejected ballots		465	0.19%	
Registered electors		415,487		
DMK hold		Swing	3.66%	

2016 Tamil Nadu Legislative Assembly election: Tambaram
Party	Candidate	Votes	%	±%
DMK	S. R. Raja	101,835	43.27%	−0.34
AIADMK	C. Rajendran	87,390	37.13%	−14.32
DMDK	M. Chezhiyan	14,559	6.19%	New
BJP	A. Vedasubramaniam	10,327	4.39%	+2.67
PMK	R. Suresh	7,631	3.24%	New
NTK	B. Naganathan	5,237	2.23%	New
NOTA	NOTA	5,007	2.13%	New
Margin of victory		14,445	6.14%	−1.71%
Turnout		235,355	61.71%	−8.17%
Registered electors		381,359		
DMK gain from AIADMK		Swing	-8.18%	

2011 Tamil Nadu Legislative Assembly election: Tambaram
Party	Candidate	Votes	%	±%
AIADMK	T. K. M. Chinnayya	91,702	51.45%	New
DMK	S. R. Raja	77,718	43.61%	−4.4
BJP	A. Veda Subramaniam	3,061	1.72%	−0.7
MGRTK	D. K. George	1,449	0.81%	New
IJK	M. Raju	955	0.54%	New
Margin of victory		13,984	7.85%	−0.83%
Turnout		178,230	69.89%	5.51%
Registered electors		255,030		
AIADMK gain from DMK		Swing	3.45%	

2006 Tamil Nadu Legislative Assembly election: Tambaram
Party	Candidate	Votes	%	±%
DMK	S. R. Raja	269,717	48.00%	+1.14
MDMK	K. Somu	220,965	39.33%	+33.88
DMDK	K. Dharma	48,522	8.64%	New
BJP	V. R. Sivaraman	13,598	2.42%	New
Margin of victory		48,752	8.68%	6.99%
Turnout		561,888	64.37%	22.86%
Registered electors		872,877		
DMK hold		Swing	1.14%	
