= K. R. Chinnarasu =

Indian politician

K. R. Chinnarasu was an Indian politician and a Member of Legislative assembly three times. He was elected to Tamil Nadu legislative assembly from Krishnagiri constituency 1977, 1980 and 1984 elections as an Anna Dravida Munnetra Kazhagam candidate.
