= T. K. M. Chinnayya =

Indian politician

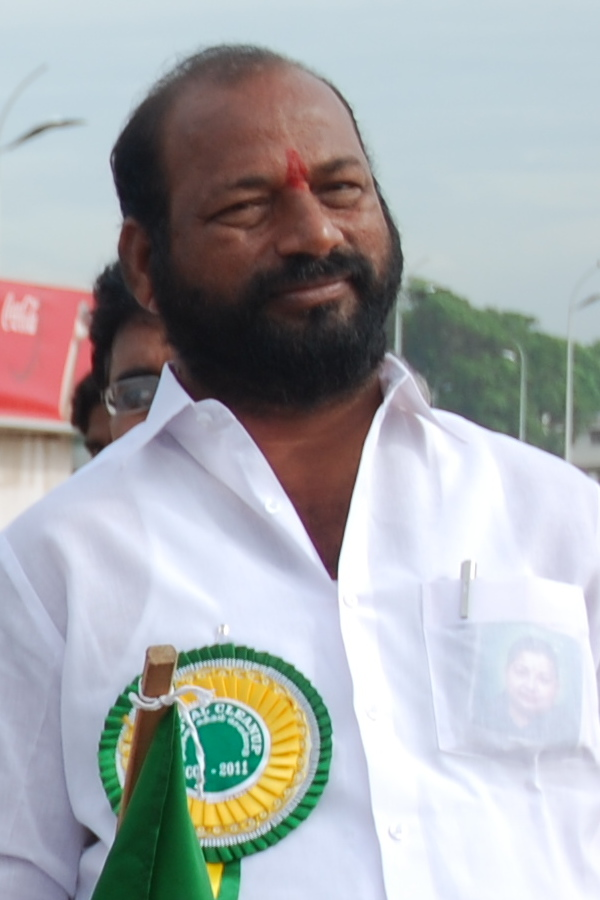
T. K. M. Chinnayya in 2011

T. K. M. Chinnayya is an Indian politician and was a member of the 14th Tamil Nadu Legislative Assembly from Tambaram constituency. He represented the All India Anna Dravida Munnetra Kazhagam party and was a cabinet minister in the Government of Tamil Nadu.

Chinnayya was Minister for Environment until November 2011 when a cabinet reshuffle by Jayalalithaa saw him replace N. R. Sivapathi as Minister for Animal Husbandry.

The elections of 2016 resulted in his constituency being won by S. R. Raja. Chinnayya was one of thirteen AIADMK MLAs in the Greater Chennai area who were deselected by the party, apparently in an attempt to thwart a potential anti-incumbency backlash from the electorate following the recent flooding. It was felt that fresh faces would put some distance between the past and the present. Following his defeat in the elections of 2021 to incumbent DMK MLA S. R. Raja, he was replaced as the AIADMK candidate for the elections of 2026 by former Chennai South MP C. Rajendran. It is noted that Rajendran earlier replaced Chinnayya as the AIADMK candidate in the 2016 elections too.
