= D. Mathiazhagan =

Indian politician

Member of the Tamil Nadu Legislative Assembly
- In office 12 May 2021 – 6 May 2026
- Preceded by: A. Krishnan
- Succeeded by: E. C. Govindharajan
- Constituency: Bargur

Personal details
- Party: Dravida Munnetra Kazhagam

Devarajan Mathiazhagan is an Indian politician who is a Member of Legislative Assembly of Tamil Nadu. He was elected from Bargur as a Dravida Munnetra Kazhagam candidate in 2021.

== Electoral performance ==
Election	Constituency	Political party	Result	Vote %	Opposition			Ref
Election	Constituency	Political party	Result	Vote %	Candidate	Political party	Vote %	Ref
2021	Bargur	DMK	Won	49.55%	A. Krishnan	AIADMK	43.13%	-
2026	Bargur	DMK	Lost	30.49%	E. C. Govindarasan	AIADMK	33.30%	-
