= Uthangarai Assembly constituency =

State Legislative Assembly Constituency in Tamil Nadu

Coordinates: 12.2659119°N 78.5352087°E

Uthangarai
- Constituency No. 51 for the Tamil Nadu Legislative Assembly

Constituency details
- Country: India
- Region: South India
- State: Tamil Nadu
- District: Krishnagiri
- Lok Sabha constituency: Krishnagiri
- Established: 2008
- Total electors: 2,35,925
- Reservation: SC

Member of Legislative Assembly
- 17th Tamil Nadu Legislative Assembly
- Incumbent N. Elaiyaraja
- Party: TVK
- Alliance: TVK+
- Elected year: 2026

Uthangarai is a state assembly constituency in Tamil Nadu, India, that was formed after the constituency delimitation in 2008. Its State Assembly Constituency number is 51. The seat is reserved for candidates from the Scheduled Castes. It comprises a portion. Located in Krishnagiri district, it consists of Uthangarai taluk and a portion of Pochampalli taluk. It is included in Krishnagiri Lok Sabha constituency. It is one of the 234 State Legislative Assembly Constituencies in Tamil Nadu in India.

== Members of Legislative Assembly ==
Year	Winner	Party
2011	Manoranjitham Nagaraj	All India Anna Dravida Munnetra Kazhagam
2016	Manoranjitham Nagaraj	All India Anna Dravida Munnetra Kazhagam
2021	T. M. Tamilselvam	All India Anna Dravida Munnetra Kazhagam
2026	N. Elaiyaraja	Tamilaga Vettri Kazhagam

== Election results ==
Vote share of winning candidates
2026	34.16%
2021	52.96%
2016	38.75%
2011	58.92%

=== 2026 ===
2026 Tamil Nadu Legislative Assembly election: Uthangarai
Party	Candidate	Votes	%	±%
TVK	N. Elaiyaraja	70,201	34.16	New
AIADMK	T. M. Tamilselvam	65,003	31.63	▼21.33
INC	R. Kuppusamy	60,993	29.68	▼8.19
NTK	Mekala	6,629	3.23	▼2.31
NOTA	NOTA	881	0.43	▼0.29
Margin of victory		5,198	2.53	▼12.55
Turnout		2,05,530	87.12	▲7.97
Registered electors		2,35,925		▼1,885
TVK gain from AIADMK		Swing	▲34.16	

=== 2021 ===
2021 Tamil Nadu Legislative Assembly election: Uthangarai
Party	Candidate	Votes	%	±%
AIADMK	T. M. Tamilselvam	99,675	52.96%	+14.21
INC	S. Arumugam	71,288	37.87%	New
NTK	Elangovan	10,424	5.54%	New
DMDK	R. Bakyaraj	2,291	1.22%	New
NOTA	NOTA	1,359	0.72%	−0.23
MNM	K. Murugesan	1,254	0.67%	New
Margin of victory		28,387	15.08%	13.63%
Turnout		188,223	79.15%	−3.45%
Rejected ballots		214	0.11%	
Registered electors		237,810		
AIADMK hold		Swing	14.21%	

=== 2016 ===
2016 Tamil Nadu Legislative Assembly election: Uthangarai
Party	Candidate	Votes	%	±%
AIADMK	Manoranjitham Nagaraj	69,980	38.75%	−20.18
DMK	S. Malathy	67,367	37.30%	New
PMK	T. N. Anguthi	23,500	13.01%	New
VCK	C. Kaniyamudhan	12,669	7.01%	New
NOTA	NOTA	1,717	0.95%	New
BJP	S. A. Pandu	1,591	0.88%	−0.78
KMDK	V. Theerthagiri	1,266	0.70%	New
Margin of victory		2,613	1.45%	−24.08%
Turnout		180,616	82.60%	0.51%
Registered electors		218,671		
AIADMK hold		Swing	-20.18%	

=== 2011 ===
2011 Tamil Nadu Legislative Assembly election: Uthangarai
Party	Candidate	Votes	%	±%
AIADMK	Manoranjitham Nagaraj	90,381	58.92%	New
VCK	Muniyammal	51,223	33.39%	New
Independent	S. Vediyappan	4,134	2.70%	New
BJP	C. K. Sankar	2,549	1.66%	New
Independent	Dr. V. Devarajan	2,138	1.39%	New
Independent	P. Vinothkumar	1,584	1.03%	New
Independent	Murugan	1,382	0.90%	New
Margin of victory		39,158	25.53%	
Turnout		153,391	82.09%	
Registered electors		186,855		
AIADMK win (new seat)				
