= Kanchana Kamalanathan =

Indian politician

Kanchana Kamalanathan is an Indian politician. She was born in Krishnagiri. She is the leader of the women wing in Dravida Munnetra Kazhagam party in Tamil Nadu. She was elected to Tamil Nadu legislative assembly in 1989 and 1996 from Krishnagiri constituency. She is the wife of M. Kamalanathan who was also a politician and member of parliament from Krishnagiri constituency. She is also a graduated doctor.
