= E. C. Govindarasan =

Indian politician

Member of the Tamil Nadu Legislative Assembly
- Incumbent
- Assumed office 11 May 2026
- Succeeded by: D. Mathiazhagan
- Constituency: Bargur

Personal details
- Party: All India Anna Dravida Munnetra Kazhagam

E. C. Govindarasan (born 1970) is an Indian politician from Tamil Nadu. He is a member of the Tamil Nadu Legislative Assembly from Bargur Assembly constituency in Krishnagiri district representing the All India Anna Dravida Munnetra Kazhagam.

Govindarasan is from Bargur, Krishnagiri district, Tamil Nadu. He is the son of Chennappa Naidu. He studied till Class 8 at the Government Boys High School, Barkur and dropped out of Class 9 in 1986. He is into agriculture and declared assets worth Rs. 5 crore in his affidavit to the Election Commission of India.

== Career ==
Govindarasan became an MLA for the first time winning the 2026 Tamil Nadu Legislative Assembly election from Bargur Assembly constituency representing the All India Anna Dravida Munnetra Kazhagam. He polled 71,240 votes and defeated his nearest rival, E. Muralidharan of Tamilaga Vettri Kazhagam, by a margin of votes.

== Electoral performance ==
Election	Constituency	Political party	Result	Vote %	Opposition			Ref
Election	Constituency	Political party	Result	Vote %	Candidate	Political party	Vote %	Ref
2016	Bargur	DMK	Lost	42.36%	V. Rajendran	AIADMK	42.89%	
2026	Bargur	AIADMK	Won	33.30%	E. Muralidharan	TVK	31.31%	-
