= Pammal Nallathambi =

Indian politician

Pammal Nallathambi was an Indian politician and former Member of the Legislative Assembly of Tamil Nadu. He was elected to the Tamil Nadu Legislative Assembly from Tambaram constituency as a Dravida Munnetra Kazhagam candidate in 1980 election.
