= P. V. S. Venkatesan =

Indian politician

P. V. S. Venkatesan was elected to the Tamil Nadu Legislative Assembly from the Kaveripattinam constituency in the 1996 elections. He was a candidate of the Dravida Munnetra Kazhagam (DMK) party.
