= E. G. Sugavanam =

Indian politician

E. Govindarajan Sugavanam (born 13 November 1957) was a member of the 15th Lok Sabha, the lower house of the Parliament of India. He represented the Krishnagiri constituency of Tamil Nadu as a Dravida Munnetra Kazhagam (DMK) party member. He defeated Jayalalithaa in the 1996 State Assembly election in Bargur constituency. He contested and lost the 1989, 1991 and 2001 Tamil Nadu state assembly elections from the same constituency. He won twice during the 2004 and 2009 Indian general elections from the Krishnagiri constituency. He was a member of various committees during the United Progressive Alliance coalition rule from 2004 to 2014.

== Early life ==
Sugavanam was born on 13 November 1957 to T. Govindarajan and Manimekalai in Bargur in Krishnagiri district. He has a Diploma in Pharmacy from K.L.E. Society’s S. Nijalingappa College in Bangalore. He is an agriculturist and pharmacist by profession and developed interest in politics later. He married Amsaveni on 28 October 1992 and the pair have a son and a daughter.

== Elections contested and positions held ==
Elections	Constituency	Result	Vote percentage	Opposition Candidate	Opposition Party	Opposition vote percentage
1989 Tamil Nadu state assembly election	Bargur	Lost	29.25	K.R. Rajendran	ADMK	30.27
1991 Tamil Nadu state assembly election	Bargur	Lost	1.26	J. Jayalalithaa	ADMK	65.18
1996 Tamil Nadu state assembly election	Bargur	Won	50.71	J. Jayalalithaa	ADMK	43.54
2001 Tamil Nadu state assembly election	Bargur	Lost	26.46	M. Thambi Durai	ADMK	66.31
2004 Indian general election	Krishnagiri	Won	54.59	K. Nange Gowdu	ADMK	38.45
2009 Indian general election	Krishnagiri	Won	44.64	K. Nange Gowdu	ADMK	34.47

- 1996: Elected to Tamil Nadu Legislative Assembly for the first time
- 2004-2009: Elected to Lok Sabha (twelfth) for the first time; Member of standing committee on energy, consultative committee of ministry of heavy industries, Central Silk Board and Energy
- May 2009: Elected to Lok Sabha (fifteenth) for the second time; Member of consultative committee of ministry of Road Transport and Highways, Central Silk Board and Energy
