= M. A. Vaithyalingam =

Indian politician

M. A. Vaithiyalingam, is an Indian politician and was a Member of the Legislative Assembly of Tamil Nadu. He was elected to the Tamil Nadu legislative assembly from Tambaram constituency as a Dravida Munnetra Kazhagam (DMK) candidate in the 1989, 1996 and 2001 elections. Three time MLA, who contested 5 times continuesly as DMK Candidate in Undivided Tambaram Constituency (Now Tambaram constituency limits has been spread over and split as Tambaram, Solonganallur, Vellachery & Pallavaram Assembly constituencies) Official Spelling: M.A.Vaidialingam. In Tamil மீ.அ.வைதியலிங்கம்
