= Sriman =

Epithet of Vishnu

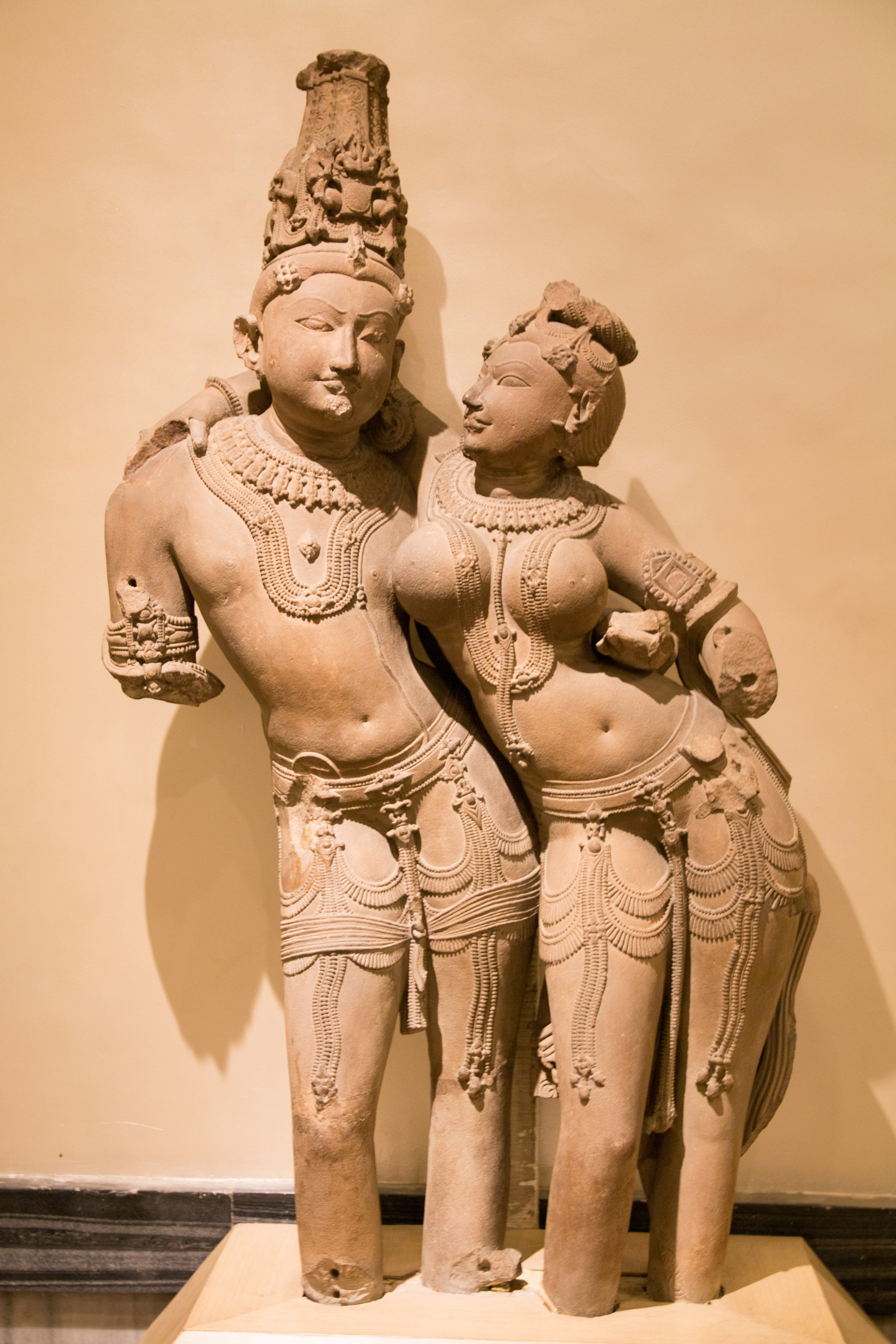
Sculpture of Sri (Lakshmi) embracing Sriman (Vishnu)

Sriman (Sanskrit: श्रीमन्, romanized: Śrīman, lit. 'fortunate') is an epithet of the Hindu deity Vishnu. It refers to the deity being the possessor of Sri, both referring to his consort Lakshmi, the goddess of prosperity, as well as the material and non-material aspects of fortune.

It is more generally used in the form of an honorific, as a prefix for male names.

== Literature ==
Sriman is a name of Vishnu, and appears as the 22nd, 178th, and the 220th names in the Vishnu Sahasranama.

According to Adi Shankara's commentary on the Vishnu Sahasranama, Sriman means "One on whose chest Sri or Lakshmi, mother of the world, always dwells."

Sriman is often used to invoke Vishnu in the mantras of Vedanta Desika.
