= Kaveripattinam Assembly constituency =

Coordinates: 12.42°N 78.22°E

Kaveripattinam
- Former constituency for the Tamil Nadu Legislative Assembly

Constituency details
- Country: India
- Region: South India
- State: Tamil Nadu
- District: Krishnagiri
- Established: 1967
- Abolished: 2008
- Total electors: 1,83,149

Kaveripattinam is a former state assembly constituency in Krishnagiri district in Tamil Nadu.

== Members of the Legislative Assembly ==
Year	Winner	Party
1971	V. C. Govindasamy	Dravida Munnetra Kazhagam
1977	K. Samarasam	All India Anna Dravida Munnetra Kazhagam
1980	K. Samarasam	All India Anna Dravida Munnetra Kazhagam
1984	K. Samarasam	All India Anna Dravida Munnetra Kazhagam
1989	V. C. Govindasamy	Dravida Munnetra Kazhagam
1991	K. P. Munusamy	All India Anna Dravida Munnetra Kazhagam
1996	P. V. S. Venkatesan	Dravida Munnetra Kazhagam
2001	K. P. Munusamy	All India Anna Dravida Munnetra Kazhagam
2006	T. A. Meganathan	Pattali Makkal Katchi

== Election results ==
=== 2006 ===
2006 Tamil Nadu Legislative Assembly election: Kaveripattinam
Party	Candidate	Votes	%	±%
PMK	T. A. Meganathan	64,878	45.96%	
AIADMK	K. P. Munusamy	53,144	37.64%	−17.11%
DMDK	K. R. Chinnaraj	14,892	10.55%	
Independent	V. Venkatesan	2,509	1.78%	
Independent	T. Rajamani	1,511	1.07%	
BSP	M. Arul Mozhi	1,173	0.83%	
Independent	D. Kuppusamy	1,069	0.76%	
Independent	S. Kaviarasu	1,043	0.74%	
BJP	K. Madappan	954	0.68%	
Margin of victory		11,734	8.31%	−6.77%
Turnout		141,173	77.08%	11.72%
Registered electors		183,149		
PMK gain from AIADMK		Swing	-8.80%	

=== 2001 ===
2001 Tamil Nadu Legislative Assembly election: Kaveripattinam
Party	Candidate	Votes	%	±%
AIADMK	K. P. Munusamy	67,241	54.75%	22.97%
DMK	V. C. Govindasamy Gounder	48,724	39.67%	−22.84%
MDMK	T. Subramani	3,785	3.08%	1.73%
Independent	P. Jayaseelan	3,061	2.49%	
Margin of victory		18,517	15.08%	−15.65%
Turnout		122,811	65.36%	−7.06%
Registered electors		187,940		
AIADMK gain from DMK		Swing	-7.76%	

=== 1996 ===
1996 Tamil Nadu Legislative Assembly election: Kaveripattinam
Party	Candidate	Votes	%	±%
DMK	P. V. S. Venkatesan	72,945	62.52%	39.77%
AIADMK	K. P. Munusamy	37,086	31.78%	−37.88%
PMK	T. A. Meganathan	3,032	2.60%	
MDMK	V. C. Govindasamy Gounder	1,582	1.36%	
PJP	P. Murugesan	984	0.84%	
Independent	T. Ravi	430	0.37%	
Independent	T. P. Gnanasekaran	274	0.23%	
Independent	T. Thotlan	195	0.17%	
Independent	G. Ramachandran	153	0.13%	
Margin of victory		35,859	30.73%	−16.19%
Turnout		116,681	72.42%	3.48%
Registered electors		171,738		
DMK gain from AIADMK		Swing	-7.15%	

=== 1991 ===
1991 Tamil Nadu Legislative Assembly election: Kaveripattinam
Party	Candidate	Votes	%	±%
AIADMK	K. P. Munusamy	70,136	69.67%	36.43%
DMK	V. C. Govindasamy Gounder	22,900	22.75%	−14.42%
PMK	N. Gounder Thatha	6,084	6.04%	
Independent	C. Nagarajan	651	0.65%	
BJP	J. P. Krishnan	533	0.53%	
Independent	R. Sankar	259	0.26%	
Independent	P. M. Ranganathan	112	0.11%	
Margin of victory		47,236	46.92%	42.98%
Turnout		100,675	68.94%	−6.22%
Registered electors		154,730		
AIADMK gain from DMK		Swing	32.50%	

=== 1989 ===
1989 Tamil Nadu Legislative Assembly election: Kaveripattinam
Party	Candidate	Votes	%	±%
DMK	V. C. Govindasamy Gounder	37,612	37.17%	−1.02%
AIADMK	P. Minisamy	33,628	33.23%	
INC	S. Kasilingam	20,538	20.30%	
AIADMK	K. V. Venkataraman	9,416	9.30%	
{{{party}}}	{{{candidate}}}	{{{votes}}}	{{{percentage}}}	
Margin of victory		3,984	3.94%	−15.05%
Turnout		101,194	75.16%	1.29%
Registered electors		138,478		
DMK gain from AKD		Swing	-20.01%	

=== 1984 ===
1984 Tamil Nadu Legislative Assembly election: Kaveripattinam
Party	Candidate	Votes	%	±%
AIADMK	K. Samarasam	47,212	57.18%	
DMK	V. C. Govindasamy Gounder	31,533	38.19%	−7.86%
Independent	V. Duri Ramchandran	3,820	4.63%	
Margin of victory		15,679	18.99%	13.91%
Turnout		82,565	73.86%	9.85%
Registered electors		121,109		
AIADMK hold		Swing	6.05%	

=== 1980 ===
1980 Tamil Nadu Legislative Assembly election: Kaveripattinam
Party	Candidate	Votes	%	±%
AIADMK	K. Samarasam	35,434	51.13%	11.17%
DMK	S. Venkatesan	31,911	46.05%	28.95%
Independent	T. Perumal Gounder	1,377	1.99%	
Independent	A. S. Varadarasan	574	0.83%	
Margin of victory		3,523	5.08%	−4.93%
Turnout		69,296	64.02%	−1.13%
Registered electors		110,686		
AIADMK hold		Swing	11.17%	

=== 1977 ===
1977 Tamil Nadu Legislative Assembly election: Kaveripattinam
Party	Candidate	Votes	%	±%
AIADMK	K. Samarasam	25,770	39.97%	
JP	E. Pattabi Naidu	19,312	29.95%	
DMK	P. V. S. Venkatesan	11,025	17.10%	−47.88%
CPI	P. K. Pattabhiraman	8,374	12.99%	
Margin of victory		6,458	10.02%	−19.94%
Turnout		64,481	65.15%	−9.26%
Registered electors		100,732		
AIADMK gain from DMK		Swing	-25.01%	

=== 1971 ===
1971 Tamil Nadu Legislative Assembly election: Kaveripattinam
Party	Candidate	Votes	%	±%
DMK	V. C. Govindasamy Gounder	41,546	64.98%	17.72%
INC	E. Pattabi Naidu	22,391	35.02%	−17.72%
Margin of victory		19,155	29.96%	24.48%
Turnout		63,937	74.41%	−2.06%
Registered electors		93,425		
DMK gain from INC		Swing	12.24%	

=== 1967 ===
1967 Madras Legislative Assembly election: Kaveripattinam
Party	Candidate	Votes	%	±%
INC	P. Naidu	32,953	52.74%	
DMK	P. V. Seeramulu	29,532	47.26%	
Margin of victory		3,421	5.47%	
Turnout		62,485	76.46%	
Registered electors		85,370		
INC win (new seat)				
