= Manoranjitham Nagaraj =

Indian politician

Manoranjitham Nagaraj is an Indian politician, was a chairman of Krishnagiri and was a member of the 14th Tamil Nadu Legislative Assembly from the Uthangarai constituency. She represented the All India Anna Dravida Munnetra Kazhagam party. She was re-elected in the elections of 2016.
