= E. R. Krishnan =

Indian politician

Edappadi Rajagopal Krishnan

Member of Parliament (Rajya Sabha)
- In office 1977–1980

Member of Parliament (Lok Sabha) for Salem
- In office 1971–1977
- Preceded by: K. Rajaram
- Succeeded by: P. Kannan

Personal details
- Born: 21 April 1922
- Died: 13 May 1998 (aged 76)
- Party: All India Anna Dravida Munnetra Kazhagam
- Spouse: Saraswathi
- Children: 3 sons, 1 daughter
- Profession: Politician

Edappadi Rajagopal Krishnan (21 April 1922 – 13 May 1998) was an Indian politician from the All India Anna Dravida Munnetra Kazhagam.

== Family ==
Krishnan was to E. Rajagopal. He served as a member of the Tamil Nadu Legislative Assembly from 1967 to 1971, Lok Sabha from 1971 to 1977 and the Rajya Sabha from 18 July 1977 to 2 April 1980.
