= Munu Adhi =

Indian politician

4th Speaker of the Tamil Nadu Legislative Assembly
- In office 6 July 1977 – 18 June 1980
- Deputy: S. Thirunavukkarasu
- Preceded by: Pulavar K. Govindan
- Succeeded by: K. Rajaram

Personal details
- Born: 4 September 1926
- Died: 21 June 2005 (aged 78)
- Occupation: politician

Munu Adhi (4 September 1926 – 21 June 2005) was an Indian politician of the Anna Dravida Munnetra Kazhagam and Member of the Legislative Assembly of Tamil Nadu. He served as the Speaker of the Tamil Nadu Legislative Assembly from 1977 to 1980.
