= T. A. Meganathan =

Indian politician

T. A. Meganathan was elected to the Tamil Nadu Legislative Assembly from the Kaveripattinam constituency in the 2006 election. He was a candidate of the Pattali Makkal Katchi (PMK) party.
