= V. C. Govindasamy =

Indian politician

V. C. Govindasamy (15 September 1941 - 8 July 2025) was an Indian politician and former Member of the Legislative Assembly of Tamil Nadu. He was elected to the Tamil Nadu legislative assembly from Kaveripattinam constituency as a Dravida Munnetra Kazhagam candidate in 1971, and 1989 elections.

Also he was a District Chairman of Agricultural Marketing Committee from 2007 to 2011

He was a participant in the 1964-65 Anti-Hindi agitation.
