= T. Senguttuvan =

Indian politician

T. Senguttuvan is an Indian politician who is a member of the Dravida Munnetra Kazhagam party. As a candidate of that party, he was elected to the Legislative Assembly of Tamil Nadu from the Krishnagiri constituency in the 2006 elections, but lost his MLA post in 2011 in the same constituency. He was re-elected at the next election, in 2011, from the Veppanahalli constituency and again in the 2016 elections when he returned to the Krishnagiri seat.
