= M. Kamlanathan =

Indian politician

M. Kamlanathan (10 April 1931 – 21 November 1997) was an Indian politician of the Dravida Munnetra Kazhagam.

He was born to K. M. Rao and served as member of the Madras Legislative Assembly from 1962 to 1967, in the panel of Chairmen of the Madras Legislative Assembly from 1963 to 1964 and the 4th Lok Sabha from 1967 to 1970. He also served as a member of the Rajya Sabha from 1971 to 1972 and 1972 to 1978.

== Family ==
Kamlanathan married K. Sakunthala with whom he had one son and two daughters.
