= List of works by C. Rajagopalachari =

Chakravarti Rajagopalachari
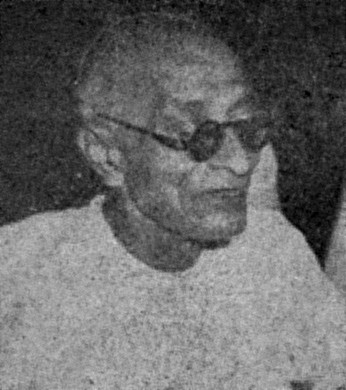
- Born: 10 December 1878; Salem district, Madras Presidency, British India
- Died: 25 December 1972 (aged 94); Madras, Tamil Nadu, India

Chakravarti Rajagopalachari (10 December 1878 – 25 December 1972), informally called Rajaji or C.R., was an Indian lawyer, Indian independence activist, politician, writer, politician and leader of the Indian National Congress who served as the last Governor-General of India. He served as the Chief Minister or Premier of the Madras Presidency, Governor of West Bengal, Minister for Home Affairs of the Indian Union and Chief minister of Madras. He was the founder of the Swatantra Party and the first recipient of India's highest civilian award, the Bharat Ratna. Rajaji vehemently opposed the usage of nuclear weapons and was a proponent of world peace and disarmament.

== Literary works ==
=== In Tamil ===
Rajaji was an accomplished writer both in his mother tongue Tamil, and English. In 1922, he published a book Siraiyil Tavam (Meditation in jail) which was a day-to-day diary about his first imprisonment from 21 December 1921 to 20 March 1922. In 1958, he was awarded the Sahitya Akademi Award for Tamil for his retelling of the Ramayana – Chakravarti Thirumagan.

In 1916, Rajaji started the Tamil Scientific Terms Society. This society coined new words in Tamil for terms connected to botany, chemistry, physics, astronomy and mathematics. At about the same time, he called for Tamil to be introduced as the medium of instruction in schools.

=== In English ===
Rajaji was the founder of the Salem Literary Society and regularly participated in its meetings in which he suggested introducing scholarships for Dalit students. He also edited Mahatma Gandhi's newspaper Young India.

In 1951, Rajaji wrote an abridged retelling of the Mahabharata in English, followed by one of the Ramayana in 1957. Earlier, in 1955, he had translated Kambar's Tamil Ramayana into English. In 1965, he translated the Thirukkural into English. He also wrote books on the Bhagavad Gita, the Upanishads, Socrates, and Marcus Aurelius in English. Rajaji often regarded his literary works as the best service he had rendered to the people. In 1958, he established the Bharatiya Vidya Bhavan.

== Musical compositions ==
Apart from his literary works, Rajaji also composed a devotional song Kurai Onrum Illai devoted to Lord Krishna. This song was set to music and is a regular in most Carnatic concerts. Rajaji composed a benediction hymn which was sung by M. S. Subbulakshmi at the United Nations General Assembly in 1967.

Rajaji was also a strong advocate of Tamil music and lent his support to the Tamil music movement of the 1940s.

== List of works ==
— Tamil —

* சிறையில் தவம்	Siraiyil Tavam		1922
* ஸோக்ரதர் அல்லது	Sōkratar, allatu, Cattiyākkiraka vijayam	Cātu Accukkūṭam	1922
* தம்பி வா	Tampī! vā!	Rōccars and Cans Limited	1939
* ஆத்ம சிந்தனை	Ātma cintan̲ai	Pārati Patippakam	1954
* துறவி லாரென்ஸ்	Tur̲avi Lāren̲s	Campā Nūlakam	1957
* நிரந்தரச் செல்வம்	Nirantarac celvam	Pārati Patippakam	1963
* திருமூலர் தவமொழி	Tirumūlar tavamol̲i	Pārati Patippakam	1964
Translations
* வியாசர் விருந்து	Viyācar viruntu	Tamil̲ppaṇṇai	1946
* திண்ணை இரசாயனம்	Tiṇṇai Racāyaṉam		1946
* கைவிளக்கு	Kaivilakku	Thirumakal	1958
* சக்கரவர்த்தி திருமகன்			1958
* கடோபநிஷத்துப் பொருள் விளக்கம்	Kaṭōpaniṣattu: poruḷ viḷakkam	Pāratīya vityā pavan̲, Cen̲n̲aik kin̲ai	1962

- English –

- India's flag (1923, Ganesh)
- Indian Prohibition Manual (1930)
- Plighted word (1933, Servants of Untouchables Society)
- The way out (1943, Oxford University Press)
- The impending fast of Mahatma Gandhi: the issues explained (1944, Servants of Untouchables Society)
- Reconciliation, why and how: a plea for immediate action (1945, Hind Kitabs)
- Ambedkar Refuted (1946, Hind Kitabs)
- The fatal cart and other stories(1946, Hindustan Times)
- Vedanta, the basic culture of India (1949)
- The Indian communists (1955, Cultural Books)
- The good administrator (1955, Government of India)
- Our democracy and other essays (1957, B.G. Paul & Co.)
- Mankind protests: a collection of speeches and statements on atomic warfare and test explosions (1957, All India Peace Council)
- Satyam eva jayate: a collection of articles contributed to Swarajya and other journals from 1956 to 1961, Volume 1 (1961, Bharathan Publications)
- Hinduism, doctrine and way of life (1959, Bharatiya Vidya Bhavan)
- The Art of translation: a symposium (1962, Government of India)
- The question of English (1962, Bharathan Publications)
- Our Culture (1963, Bharatiya Vidya Bhavan)
- Gandhiji's teachings and philosophy (1963, Bharatiya Vidya Bhavan)
- Swatantra answer to Chinese Communist challenge (1964)
- English for unity (1965, Bharathan Publications)
- The unification of cultures: being an address delivered at the Indian Institute of World Culture on 18 August 1966, under Major-General S.L. Bhatia Endowment Lectureship (1966)
- Stories for the innocent (1967, Bharatiya Vidya Bhavan)
- Bharati, the Tamil poet (Bharathi Tamil Sangam)

Translations

- Bhagavad-gita abridged and explained: setting forth the Hindu creed, discipline and ideals (1949, Hindustan Times)
- Mahabharatha (1951, Bharatiya Vidya Bhavan)
- Sri Ramakrishna Upanishad (1953, Sri Ramakrishna Math)
- Ramayana (1957, Bharatiya Vidya Bhavan)
- Bhaja Govindam (1965, Bharatiya Vidya Bhavan)
- Kural: the great book of Tiru-Valluvar (1965, Bharatiya Vidya Bhavan)
