= INDC =

INDC may refer to:

- Indian National Democratic Congress, an Indian political party
- Iraqi National Dialogue Council, a Sunni Arab political party
- Intended Nationally Determined Contributions
