= Venkatakrishna =

Venkatakrishna is a name. Notable people with the name include:

- K. S. Venkatakrishna Reddiar (1909–1966), Indian politician
- L. Venkatakrishna Iyer, Indian civil engineer
