= Thorapalli =

- village
- Location in Tamil Nadu, India Thorapalli (India)
- Coordinates: 12°41′10.306″N 77°52′51.235″E
- Country: India
- State: Tamil Nadu
- District: Krishnagiri

Population (2011)
  - Total: 9,849

Languages
  - Official: Tamil
- Time zone: UTC+5:30 (IST)

Thorapalli or Thorapalli Agraharam is a village in Hosur taluk, Krishnagiri district, Tamil Nadu. It is located on the banks of the Ponnaiyar river about 6 km south-east of Hosur close to the Hosur-Krishnagiri road (National Highway 44), about 50 kilometres from Bangalore. It is the birthplace of C. Rajagopalachari, the last Governor-General of India and second chief minister of Madras State (now Tamil Nadu).

== Demographics ==
=== 2011 ===
The 2011 Census of India reported that Thorapalli had a population of 9,849 people. The sex ratio was 90.13, with 4,669 males and 5,180 females. The literacy rate was 62.43, with 6,149 literates (3,014 male and 3,135 female) and 3,700 illiterates (1,655 male and 2,045 female).

=== 2001 ===
The 2001 Census of India reported that Thorapalli had a population of 2947, with 1365 males and 1350 females. The sex ratio was 989 and the literacy rate was 53.01.
