= Modified Scheme of Elementary Education 1953 =

The Modified Scheme of Elementary Education or New Scheme of Elementary Education or Madras Scheme of Elementary Education dubbed by its critics as Kula Kalvi Thittam (Hereditary Education Policy), was an abortive attempt at education reform introduced by the Indian National Congress Government of the Madras State, led by C. Rajagopalachari (Rajaji) in 1953. The scheme proposed the introduction of two shifts or sessions in elementary schools. In one session regular teaching would be done and during the second session, the students would be sent home to learn the occupations of their parents. It became controversial and was accused of being a casteist scheme to perpetuate the caste hierarchy as Hindu Professions were caste based. Public opposition and internal dissent within the congress led to the deferment of the scheme. The discontent it triggered among the Congress legislature members forced the resignation of Rajaji as Chief Minister. The scheme was dropped completely by Rajaji's successor Kamaraj in 1954.

== Background ==
According to the 1951 Census of India, the literacy rate in the Madras State was 20.86%. During fiscal year 1950–51, the Madras State Government spent 6.87 crore Rupees (6,870,000) – about 11.5% of total revenues for the state – for Elementary education. The enrollment rate for children of school-going age was around 47.8%. The Directive Principles of the Indian Constitution require the Indian state to provide education to all citizens. In accordance to this directive, in 1950 the Madras State's Directorate of Public Instruction prepared a ten-year plan to provide education to all children of school-going age. This plan called for an allocation of one crore Rs (1,00,00,000) per year for enrolling 500,000 additional students for the next ten years. Against this, the actual allocation in 1950–51 was only Rs. 500,000. The cost of educating a student was estimated to be around Rs.22.80 per year, out of which the government's contribution was Rs.16.30. Out of the 12,22,775 students who had enrolled in standard I in 1946–47, only 4,61,686 (37%) had reached the Standard V in 1950–51. It was against this background, the Congress party with Rajaji as chief minister took power on 10 April 1952.

The opposition to the scheme was largely based on social background. Hindu professions are based on Varna or Caste with the Brahmins the highest in the order and studied while Kshatriya and Vaishya traders received some education. Shudra were denied education. Dalits were considered untouchables and did manual work and also denied education. When the Justice Party came to power in 1920, Brahmins disproportionately occupied over 70% of the high level posts in government, judiciary and in education. The Justice Party introduced caste based reservation and this gradually reversed this trend and allowed non-Brahmins to rise in the government and education in Madras Presidency. The first generation of Dalits, Scheduled Castes and Tribes and Backward Classes also started getting educated and their children had just begun to attend school after centuries of denial of educational opportunities under the rigid Hindu caste system. As per this policy schools were to work in the morning and students had to compulsorily learn the family vocation in the afternoon. This was seen as a ploy to ensure the domination and monopoly of Brahmins. The ulterior motive behind the scheme was understood to be that the children of non-Brahmins should undertake only the manual jobs of their ancestors such as washerman, barber, scavenger, cobbler etc. and they should not aspire for any higher education or for any white collar employment, which only Brahmins could claim as their exclusive privilege. They should follow their parents' professions and remain in their low status and lowly paid professions. Such a step would maintain caste hegemony.

Rajagopalachari argued,

It is a mistake to imagine that the school is within the walls. The whole village is a school. The village polytechnic is there, every branch of it, the dhobi, the wheelwright, the cobbler.

== Earlier attempts at change ==
In 1939, during Rajaji's first term as Chief Minister of the Madras Presidency, the girl students of standards III to V and those belonging to Scheduled Castes had been allowed to attend school for only three hours a day and spend the rest of the day helping their parents. In the academic year 1949–50, during the Chief ministership of P. S. Kumaraswamy Raja, an experimental shift system had been introduced in ten taluks and later expanded to other areas as an optional measure. Schools which adapted this system functioned in two shifts or sessions. Teachers who worked during both sessions were paid an additional allowance of 10 Rupees per month. However this system was not widely adopted and by 1951 only 155 elementary schools (out of a total 38,687) in the state were functioning in shifts.

== Reasons stated for the reform attempt ==
- The cost of educating all children in the 6–12 age group would be enormous. Besides enrollment, more than half of the elementary schools lacked proper infrastructure. The reform attempted to increase the number of school-going children within the financial limitations faced by the Government.
- There was an acute shortage of teachers. The state had an average of less than three teachers for five standards per school. There were 4,108 single-teacher schools and more than 60% of the schools with five standards had less than four teachers.
- This poor student-teacher ratio was putting a strain on the teachers and led to students being made to stay in school for longer hours. This directly contributed to the high drop out ratio. This plural teaching had to be stopped without hiring new teachers.
- Rajaji favoured Gandhi's Basic Education Scheme over the existing elementary education system. He stated that he wanted to reduce the unemployment amongst educated people. The Basic education system called for learning through living and training in self-reliance.
- The retention rate of 37% (between 1947 and 1951) had to be improved by making schools attractive to students of poorer sections.

== Proposals in the new scheme ==
The Modified Scheme of Elementary education proposed the following changes in the school system:

- Reduction of School hours from five hours per day to three.
- Introduction of shifts -the students were to be divided into two batches and the school would function in two sessions. Each session will be of three hours duration, consisting of four periods of 40 minutes each, with not less than two intervals totaling 20 minutes. The sessions will be arranged to suit local conditions. One batch will attend only one session a day. There were to be six working days per week.
- No dilution of the previous syllabus and no reduction in duration for subjects like Language, Elementary Mathematics, Nature Study, Drawing, History, Geography, Hygiene, Civics, Moral Instruction and Singing.
- The second session in which the students would be out of school was to be utilised for obtaining the objectives of the basic education system – learning through living and training in self-reliance.
- During the out of school session, the girl students were to learn house keeping from their mothers in their home environment. The boys were supposed to learn farming or other crafts from their respective fathers.
- Boys whose parents did not belong to occupational groups, were to be sent to work in farms or with other craftsmen in their villages.
- In addition to the learning the students were to be utilised in service to the village like building sheds, laying bricks, attending to village sanitation, improving roads, etc..
- The out of school session would have no strict attendance or work requirements.

== Implementation ==
The Rajaji Government introduced the new elementary education scheme in all schools in the non-municipal (rural) areas for the academic year 1953–54 (from 18 June 1953). It was planned that eventually the scheme would be extended to 35,000 of the total 38,687 schools in the state. However, due to public opposition, it was put on hold on 29 July 1953 and dropped altogether on 18 May 1954.

Rajaji had not even consulted his own cabinet or members of the legislative assembly before the scheme's implementation.

Rajaji said: “Did Shankara or Ramanuja announce their philosophy after consulting others?".

== Opposition ==
From the beginning, the scheme attracted heavy opposition from the Dravidian movement led by Periyar E. V. Ramasamy. The Dravidar Kazhagam organised a conference in Erode protesting the scheme's introduction. The teachers' unions also opposed their move as they were not consulted before implementation. They also resented the increase in working hours without any increase in pay. The DMK seized the opportunity and started a campaign against the scheme. They dubbed the scheme as the Kula kalvi thittam (Hereditary/Caste Education Scheme) and as the Acharyar Education Scheme. The Dravidian movement viewed the scheme as an attempt to preserve and perpetuate caste based discrimination through official means. They used Rajaji's notions about caste and village craftsmen to depict the scheme as a "Brahminist conspiracy". Rajaji had earlier expressed his opinion about castes and crafts as:

The food is grown, the cloth is woven, the sheep are shorn, the shoes are stitched, the scavenging is done, the cartwheels and the ploughs are built and repaired because, thank God, the respective castes are still there and the homes are trade schools as well and the parents are masters as well, to whom the children are automatically apprenticed.

After the scheme was announced, Rajaji gave a speech to the washermen at the Adyar riverbank. In it he referred to Kuladharma, the social obligation of each clan or caste. The opposition used such incidents to lend credence to their "casteist motive" accusation. Rajaji and his education minister MV Krishna Rao responded with a counter campaign in the scheme's defense. They gave speeches and made broadcasts in the All India Radio explaining their position. The month of June 1953 saw aggressive propaganda efforts by both the proponents and opponents of the scheme. On 13 July 1953, the DMK executive committee met and decided to conduct a marial (blockade) agitation outside the Chief Minister's residence. EVK Sampath was nominated to lead the agitation. This agitation was part of a three pronged attack on the Government's policies by the DMK. On 14 July 1953, a procession led by Satyavani Muthu was organised to protest the scheme. Its destination was Rajaji's official residence at Bazullah road, T. Nagar. It was stopped by the police as it was unlicensed. The next day (15 July 1953) the confrontation heated up with the Government introducing a motion in the Legislative Assembly for implementing the scheme from the academic year 1953–54. On the same day another DMK procession was stopped before it could reach T Nagar. In the next fifteen days as many as twenty such processions were attempted by the DMK.

== Deferment ==
By the end of July, public opinion started to turn against the scheme and at least four public petitions were tabled in the Legislative Assembly about the scheme. On 29 July 1953, M.V Krishna Rao, the minister for education moved a motion for considering the new scheme. After a discussion, Communist leader K. P Gopalan moved a motion to drop the scheme. The house was deadlocked with 138 ayes to 138 noes on dropping the scheme. The speaker of the assembly J. Shivashanmugam Pillai used his casting vote to defeat the motion. A second motion to defer the scheme and refer it to a committee of experts was moved by K.R Viswanatham. This motion passed with 138 ayes against 137 noes. The Scheme was stayed and the Parulekar Committee was commissioned to review the scheme.

== Parulekar committee ==
On 20 August 1953, the Government passed an order (Education G.O # 1888) to constitute a committee of experts for reviewing the scheme. The committee was composed of Prof. RV. Parulekar, Director of Indian Institute of Education Bombay, as the Chairman; Dr.B.B. Dey, Retired Director of Public Instruction, Madras; Prof. Mohammad Mujeeb, Vice-Chancellor of the Jamia Millia University as members and S. Govindarajulu Naidu, the former Director of Public Instruction, Madras, and the then Director of Public Instruction, Andhra Pradesh, as the Member Secretary. The Parulekar committee submitted its report on 23 November 1953. It found the scheme to be sound and endorsed the Government's position. It made additional recommendations including extending the scheme to rural areas, opening as many as 4000 new schools, revising the existing curriculum, providing training and remuneration to the craftsmen involved.

== Cancellation ==
The opposition campaign was successful in creating doubts about the scheme in the minds of the general public. There was dissent within the Congress party and Kamaraj wanted Rajaji to withdraw the scheme as it was unpopular amongst the public and with the party members. On 20 October 1953, forty Congress Legislative Assembly members led by P. Varadarajulu Naidu, sent a memorandum to Nehru objecting to Rajaji's unilateral conduct. Among the issues they raised was his refusal to budge on the education scheme issue. But Rajaji refused to drop the scheme. On 8 November 1953, Congress lost the by election for the Kangayam constituency by a narrow margin. Pressure mounted from within the party to drop the scheme. On 9 March 1954, Congress leader and former Chief Minister O. P. Ramaswamy Reddiyar made an open appeal to Rajaji in the legislature:

Please give up the scheme without any more ado. It is a new handle to the Blackshirts [Dravidar Kazhagam]. Persistence will sound only the death knell of the party.

But Rajaji did not relent and his education minister C Subramaniam upped the ante by announcing that the scheme would be extended to urban areas in June 1954. This spurred the Congress legislators into open revolt. They scheduled a meeting of the Congress Legislative Party on 21 March. Faced with certain defeat in the leadership election that was bound to happen in that meeting, Rajaji tried a last minute compromise – he would quit if C. Subramaniam was chosen as his successor and the scheme was kept. But Kamaraj, the leader of the anti-Rajaji camp, refused to accept the deal. The meeting was postponed by a week and when it happened on 31 March, C. Subramaniam was defeated by Kamaraj. Rajaji resigned and Kamaraj took over as chief minister on 13 April 1954. This effectively ended the prospects of the new education scheme. On 18 May 1954, C Subramaniam announced in the assembly that the scheme was being dropped. The reason stated for the dropping was that the necessary acceptance, support and cooperation of the people were not forthcoming for the scheme and the atmosphere was not propitious for the success of the scheme.

Meanwhile, the composite Madras State had been reorganised along linguistic lines. The state of Andhra had split from Madras on 1 October 1953. The Andhra Government constituted an Elementary Education Committee with Dr. B. Kuppuswamy as chairman to review the elementary education situation. The Kuppuswamy committee report recommended the rejection of the Modified Elementary Education Scheme. In 1954 the Andhra state cancelled the scheme.

== Criticism ==
The main arguments made against the Modified Scheme of Elementary Education were :

- That the scheme was casteist by design. According to C. N. Annadurai, it aimed to preserve and perpetuate the caste hierarchy by ensuring that children took up their parents' profession. It was designed to help Brahmins corner positions of authority .
- That it intended to reduce the schooling imparted to children by not monitoring them during out of school sessions.
- That it would increase the workload of teachers as it would increase their working hours and force them to handle more children without the appointment of new teachers and without an increase in their pay.
- That it was undemocratic and dictatorial as Rajaji had not consulted his cabinet or the assembly in his decision to implement the scheme (In Rajaji's own words – This is an executive matter, no law is involved and Did Shankara and Ramanuja announce their philosophy after consulting others?).
- That it was deliberately targeted at rural children alone to keep them from getting an education.

Writing in Viduthalai on 17 November 1953, Periyar denounced the scheme as a Brahiminical conspiracy:

This educational policy is a casteist educational policy. This has to be opposed and abolished...Is this educational scheme not a reconstruction and protection of varnashrama?...who physically labours and slaves in the name of caste? Only we, who are called sudras...should we keep doing the caste occupation while brahmins alone get positions, employment, authority and go higher and higher?...is this justified?..we don't think physical labour is disgraceful, but why should we alone do that work?.... ...How much of opposition to Rajaji’s minister post? Though the situation is such that his post can topple any day. If he can manage all that and still have a tight grip, what is it for? Only to save his race, only for the protection of the Brahmin society. As long as he is in power, he wants to fill up Brahmins in all the places. He wants to repress the Sudras, and with that motive alone he remains in power. Among us we do not have this mind, this feeling, this racial fanaticism! He fights for the welfare of the Brahmin race...

In another Viduthalai article written on 26 February 1954, he vowed to destroy the scheme by any means:

Rajaji says that people in the villages do not need education.He has said that the student in the village should cut hair, he should wash clothes, and he should make pots and pans. The village school is only for three hours duration, the rest of the time our children should graze donkeys, this is called the New Primary Education Scheme. We organized a conference in Erode only to oppose this educational scheme. Can we keep looking at law and democracy in such a situation? The work will be successful only through a great revolution. Though 100, 1000 of us will have to be sacrificed, we need to be prepared. That is why even I gave a three months notice; and said that if they want to shoot, let them shoot. I am going to start a struggle. This educational scheme has to be destroyed by all means.

He kept up his harangue even after Rajaji resigned and C Subramaniam became the new Education minister. On 17 April 1954 he wrote:

Rajaji did this only because of the fear that the position of his society will disappear. If the Vanaan washes clothes, if the Paraiyan beats the drums, if the Chakkili stitches shoes, if the Ambattan shaves, only then they will get the feeling that they are a low caste. If they also get educated and come ahead, the highness of the upper castes will disappear. So, Rajaji interfered in the basics by introducing a 3-hour occupational education... ...The servant of this Rajaji, C. Subramanian was the one who raised his hand to say that Sudras don’t need communal representation. Those who had gone on the merit of our votes were sitting there like the five Pandavas during Draupadi’s disrobing. All this takes place in this country. If it had been another country, four or five (death) anniversaries would have been observed for such people. When it is so, how can we fight legally?

The Andhra Elementary Education Committee Report also rejected the Modified Scheme and recommended an approach similar to the one eventually adopted by the Kamaraj Government.

== Defense and endorsements ==
During and after his tenure as Chief Minister, Rajaji defended his scheme vigorously. He derided the critics as people who did not want to do physical labour:

The opposition to the scheme comes mainly from those who do not want to do any physical labour. There are others who ask whether there will be any examination in the crafts. That may come or may not come. But I would like you to ponder over one factor. Are not the children of parents with an educational tradition at an advantage now over children whose parents have no education at all? Should an examination in crafts be held, will not the children of illiterate artisans score over the other class of children? In that way will not the handicap of the poor man's children be removed? The new system gives a chance to the backward people to progress. I would, therefore, appeal to you all to support the scheme or at least desist from opposing it.

About the casteist angle of the criticism, he reasoned that it was because of him being the author of the scheme:

It is indeed regrettable that it should be said that there is a big conspiracy behind the new scheme. Probably because I am its author, some people suspect there is something behind it..If some other person would have done it, by God's grace, everyone might have accepted it and the scheme might have worked successfully...I made similar suggestions over 30 years ago.

After the Kamaraj Government scrapped the scheme, he again defended it as :

My plan was based on the conviction – which was confirmed by educational officers of highest rank and experience – that three hours attendance was quite adequate for the purpose and would leave nothing out of the present elementary school instruction.

Replying to Papanasam MLA Swayam Prakasam's concerns over the scheme, then Prime Minister, Jawaharlal Nehru offered his endorsement to the scheme:

As for the education policy which Rajaji has sponsored, I cannot speak for conditions in Madras. But that policy is an aspect of Basic Education which is the proved policy of our Government. The Madras proposals, as you know, were referred to a special High-powered Committee of Educationists. They expressed their approval of them. ...At the Governors' Conference recently, the Madras proposals were not directly discussed, but the present system was discussed and thoroughly disapproved of and generally the basic system was approved.

India's President Rajendra Prasad offered his support in a letter written to the Governor of Madras – Sri Prakasa – on 9 June 1953:

I have read with great interest both the speech of Rajaji and the scheme of education in primary schools in rural areas. I have felt great dissatisfaction with the present scheme of things so far as education is concerned... with the large number of graduates and under graduates we are turning out from year to year are without any employment...most of them are unemployable... This scheme fits them at any rate for their parents' work or for the work people have been doing in their own place. With education it may be hoped that they would be able to do that work better. I there look forward with great hope and enthusiasm to this experiment.

The Central Advisory Board of Education, passed a resolution endorsing the scheme during its 21st Meeting held in February 1954:

"The Central Advisory Board of Education has given careful consideration to the Modified Scheme of Elementary Education formulated by the Madras Government. It is of the opinion that the Scheme represents a welcome attempt to bring education within the reach of a large majority of children and thus help in the achievement of the constitutional directive about the provision of universal Primary Education. The Board is also satisfied that the reduction of school hours from five to three will not necessarily affect the education of children adversely, provided the out-of-school activities which are an integral part of the education of children are implemented under controlled conditions. The Board also appreciates the attempt made in the Scheme for bringing education into closer contact with the life of the community and this gives it a practical bias which is at present lacking in ordinary Primary Schools.

The Board would, however, like to point out that the arrangements made for the out-of-school activities of the children need to be carefully supervised on the lines suggested by the Parulekar Committee and their success critically assessed from time to time. Further, the Board would like to place on record its definite opinion that this Scheme is valuable as an interim measure only, because, sufficient funds are not at present available for providing education to all the children and that the proper pattern of education for the country is Basic Education which would offer full-time co-related education to children in which teaching of craft as well as of other school subjects will be provided under proper educative conditions in the school itself, which will serve as a community centre where the school and the community are brought into an organic relationship.

The Board would also recommend that other States may conduct similar experiments under controlled conditions. (The Madras Government have since intimated their decision to discontinue their modified scheme of Elementary Education)

== Legacy ==
The Modified Scheme of Elementary Education even after being dropped had the unintended consequence of bringing primary education to hundreds of thousands of school children in Tamil Nadu. Rajaji's successor Kamaraj was ever mindful of the fact that it was the issue of primary education that caused his predecessor's downfall. Knowing the public opposition to Rajaji's scheme he took the diametrically opposite approach in providing education to Tamil Nadu's children – imparting free and compulsory education till the age of 14. He set up a commission under R.M. Alagappa Chettiar to examine the means for providing compulsory primary education. Instead of sending children away from the school, the committee recommended active Government intervention to bring more children into the schooling system by building new schools and abolishing school fees. This approach was successful and by the end of Kamaraj's tenure as Chief Minister in 1963, enrollment in primary schools had been doubled.

== See also ==
- Child labour in India
