= C. R. formula =

Partition proposal of British India during WWII

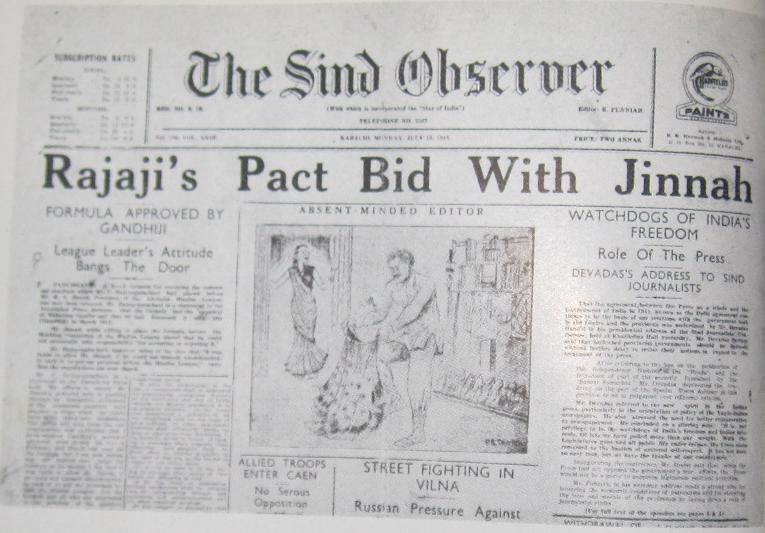
The Sind Observer reports Gandhi's acceptance to the C. R. Formula

C. Rajagopalachari's formula (or C. R. formula or Rajaji formula) was a proposal formulated by Chakravarti Rajagopalachari to solve the political deadlock between the All India Muslim League and the Indian National Congress on the independence of British India. The League's position was that the Muslims and Hindus of British India were of two separate nations and henceforth the Muslims had the right to their own nation. The Congress, which had predominantly Hindu members, opposed to the idea of partitioning the Subcontinent. With the advent of the Second World War the British administration sought to divide the Indian political elite into two factions so as to make sure that the Indian independence movement does not make large progress, taking advantage of the war.

C. Rajagopalachari, a Congress leader from Madras, devised a proposal for the Congress to offer the League the predominantly Muslim region that became Pakistan based on a plebiscite of allowing the people in those regions where Muslims were in the majority. Although the formula was opposed even within the Congress party, Gandhi used it as the basis of his proposal in talks with Jinnah in 1944. However, Jinnah rejected the proposal and the talks failed and thus C.R. Formula did not come into effect.

== Congress and League ==
The All India Muslim League was formed in 1906 to "protect the interests of Muslims" in British India and to "represent their needs and aspirations to the Government". The Indian National Congress, formed in 1885, had demanded self-governance in India. In 1916, the League and the Congress entered into a pact in which the League agreed to support the Congress' efforts for home rule in exchange for the Congress' support for a two electorate system that would create constituencies where only Muslims could contest and vote. In the elections of 1937, Congress emerged as the largest party in seven of the 11 provinces with a clear majority in five (Madras Presidency, Uttar Pradesh, Central Province, Bihar and Orissa). On the whole, Congress won 716 of the 1161 seats it contested. The League secured 4.8% of the total Muslim votes (winning 25% of the seats allotted for Muslims) and did not acquire majority in any of the four Muslim predominant provinces (Punjab, Sind Province, North West Frontier Province and Bengal Presidency). The League had hoped that its candidates would win the votes over the Congress in Muslim electorates, but was disappointed. Since Congress had majority in Hindu majority provinces, it refused to share power with the League in those provinces. The eventual disagreement led to a political tussle between the League and the Congress climaxing with the League's Lahore Resolution in March 1940, calling for an independent Muslim nation carved out of British India.

== Second World War ==
In September 1939, Lord Linlithgow, the then Viceroy of India, announced that India was at war with Germany. The Congress Party resigned its provincial seats in protest, stating that the viceroy's decisions had pushed India into a war not of India's making and without consulting its people or representatives. Nevertheless, many Congress leaders, including Nehru had expressed moral support to the Allies cause against the Nazis. Congress demanded that if Britain was fighting to protect democracy through the war, it should also establish democracy in India. However, both the Viceroy and the Secretary of State for India (Leo Amery) openly disliked Indian National Congress and its leaders including Gandhi and Nehru. Moreover, since the British Indian army was dominated by Muslims and Sikhs, the government in London was keen to get both these parties' support rather than appeasing Congress. While Jinnah's Muslim League wanted a Muslim Pakistan, Sikhs feared that if India were divided, Punjab would come under Pakistan and hence put the Sikhs under Muslim rule. Eventually the British administration concluded that no progress towards Indian statehood could be made unless Congress and the League reached an agreement.

With Japan's attack on Pearl Harbor, the US entered the war. Later the Japanese invasion of South East Asia in 1941 drew the war much closer to India. Congress maintained that it would support the war efforts of Britain provided India was given its freedom. While the Congress demanded a unified India and that the issue of a Muslim nation be resolved after independence, the League preferred that separate dominions be created first. Jinnah claimed that he wanted "Pakistan and that commodity is available not in the Congress market but in the British market". Although the ruling Conservatives had taken a harsh stance on the Congress, the Labour Party and its leaders were sympathetic to its efforts. The war saw an increase in support in Britain for efforts to solve the crisis between the Raj, Congress and League. It was realised that the deadlock meant that the vast resources of India was not available to the war. In addition, America had been sympathetic to India's cause, which if not satisfied by the British administration would have further weakened the Allies. With divided opinion within the British government, Sir Stafford Cripps was sent to India in March 1942. Since Cripps was a well known Congress sympathiser who had earlier advised the Congress leaders to "stand firm as a rock" on their demands of freedom, he was seen as the best choice for negotiations. Cripps' mission however failed as the Congress declared that he was assuming different stances in private and public with regard to Indian self-governance. Cripps' failure

== Chakravarti Rajagopalachari's role ==
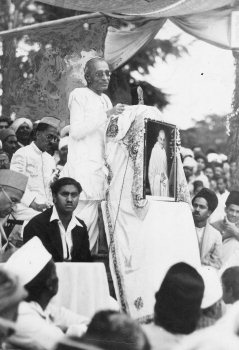
C. Rajagopalachari during a rally in 1939

Chakravarti Rajagopalachari (or Rajaji as he was commonly referred to) was a prominent Congress leader from Madras. He was a well known follower of Gandhi and was sometimes referred to as Gandhi's conscience keeper. Nonetheless, he proposed that if Muslims in India wanted a partition, Congress should not oppose this. Thus he was the earliest Congress leader to acknowledge that partition was inevitable. He considered that, in the then likely scenario of Japanese invasion, India would need the support of the British and hence required the Congress and the League to agree on the constitution of India with urgency. In April 1942, parts of the Madras Presidency were bombed by Japanese warplanes operating from the aircraft carrier Ryūjō. Arthur Hope, the Governor of Madras advised the people to leave Madras and also moved the secretariat inland. Rajaji considered this an act of the British administration forsaking the people of Madras and brought resolutions in Madras Legislature Party of the All India Congress Committee that the Congress should concede the demand of Pakistan if the League insisted on it. With severe opposition to the resolutions from the Congress leadership, he resigned from the Congress as per Gandhi's advice. Thus he did not participate in the Quit India movement and was not arrested with the other Congress leaders. Hence he was able to devise a proposal to negotiate with the League. This proposal, which was called the CR formula by the popular press was to recognise the demand for Pakistan in principle and to act as a basis for talks between the League and the Congress.

== The proposal ==
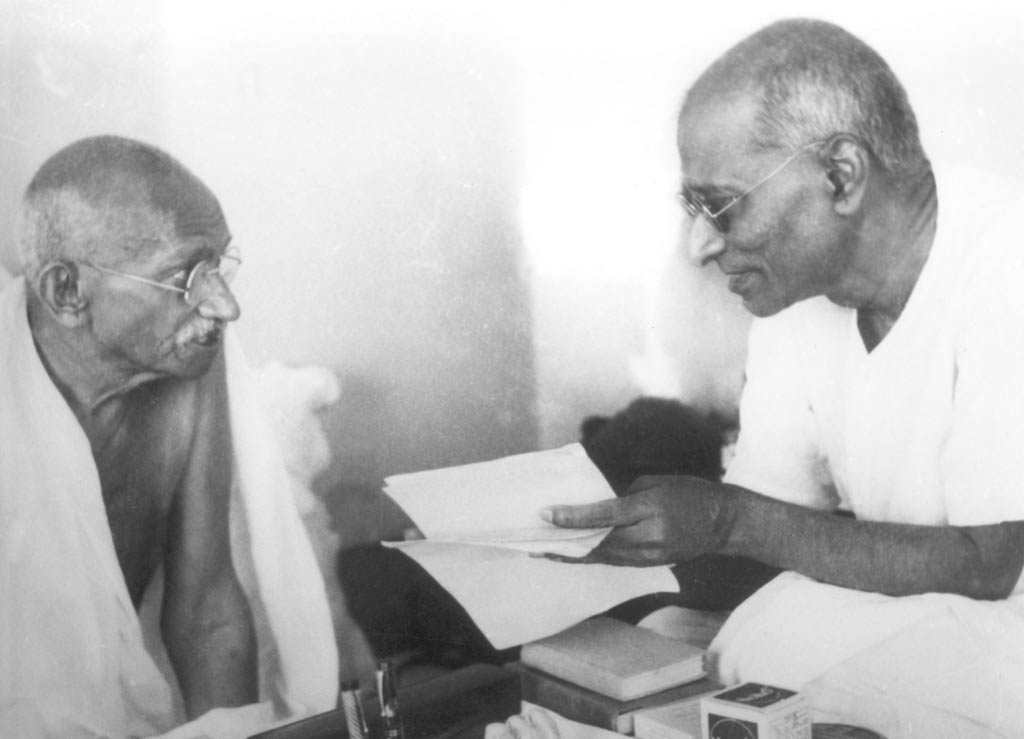
Mohandas Gandhi and C. Rajagopalachari during the Gandhi-Jinnah talks at Birla House, Bombay

The CR formula entailed

i. The League was to endorse the Indian demand for independence and to co-operate with the Congress in formation of Provisional Interim Government for a transitional period.

ii. At the end of the War, a commission would be appointed to demarcate the districts having a Muslim population in absolute majority and in those areas plebiscite to be conducted on all inhabitants (including the non-Muslims) on basis of adult suffrage.

iii. All parties would be allowed to express their stance on the partition and their views before the plebiscite.

iv. In the event of separation, a mutual agreement would be entered into for safeguarding essential matters such as defence, communication and commerce and for other essential services.

v. The transfer of population, if any would be absolutely on a voluntary basis.

vi. The terms of the binding will be applicable only in case of full transfer of power by Britain to Government of India.

== Gandhi–Jinnah talks of 1944 ==
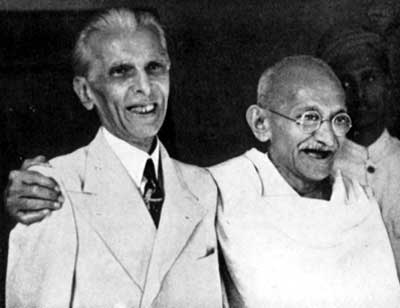
Gandhi and Jinnah in Bombay, September 1944

As the Allies saw more victories, the attitude of British administration towards Congress softened. Moreover, America had been pressing Britain to meet India's demand for self-governance. Although other Congress leaders were still in prison Gandhi was released on 5 May 1944. After his release Gandhi proposed talks with Jinnah on his two-nation theory and negotiating on issue of partition. The CR formula acted as the basis for the negotiations. Gandhi and Jinnah met in September 1944 to ease the deadlock. Gandhi offered the CR formula as his proposal to Jinnah. Nevertheless, Gandhi-Jinnah talks failed after two weeks of negotiations.

== Causes of failure of the proposal ==
Although the formulation supported the principle of Pakistan, it aimed to show that the provinces that Jinnah claimed as Pakistan contained large numbers of non-Muslims. Jinnah had claimed provinces then regarded as Muslim majority regions (in the north-west; Sind, Baluchistan, the North-West Frontier Province and the Punjab, and in the north-east, Assam and Bengal). Thus if a plebiscite was placed, Jinnah ran a risk of partitioning Punjab and Bengal. Moreover, Jinnah considered that the League represented all Muslims and the adult franchise demanded by the formula was redundant. Furthermore, the decision of Muslims to secede from India, according to the CR formula, would be taken not just by Muslims alone but by a plebiscite of the entire population even in the Muslim majority districts. This, according to Ayesha Jalal (a Pakistani-American sociologist and historian), might well have diluted the enthusiasm of the people of these provinces about going partition. Hence Jinnah rejected the initiative, telling his Council that it was intended to 'torpedo' the Lahore resolution; it was the 'grossest travesty', a 'ridiculous proposal', 'offering a shadow and a husk – a maimed, mutilated and moth-eaten Pakistan, and thus trying to pass off having met out Pakistan scheme and Muslim demand'.

While the formula retained most of the essential services, Jinnah wanted a full partition and any relations would be dealt via treaty alone. Although a failure the CR formula was seen as Congress' betrayal of the Sikhs by Akali Dal leaders like Master Tara Singh. Since the formula meant vivisection of Punjab, if agreed the Sikh community would be divided. Sikhs did not hold a majority in any single district. Splitting Punjab would leave many on both sides of the dividing line. The proposal had been attacked by other leaders such as V. D. Sarvarkar and Syama Prasad Mookerjee of the Hindu Mahasabha and Srinivas Sastri of National Liberal Federation. However, Wavell the then viceroy of India who had earlier insisted on the geographic unity of India, stated that the talks based on the CR formula failed because Gandhi himself did "not really believe" in the proposal nor Jinnah was ready to "answer awkward questions" which would reveal that he had "not thought out the implications of Pakistan".
