= K. S. Venkatakrishna Reddiar =

Indian politician and activist

K. S. Venkatakrishna Reddiar (1909 – 14 January 1966) was an Indian politician and activist of the cooperative movement. He served as President of the short-lived Congress Reform Committee from 1957 to 1959.

== Early life ==
Born in South Arcot, Venkatakrishna Reddiar worked to establish cooperative societies. He joined the Indian National Congress and participated in the Indian independence movement.

== Congress Reform Committee ==
Reddiar resigned from the Congress in 1957 when the party ignored him in favour of representatives from its ally, Tamil Nadu Toilers Party (TNT) for the 1957 elections. He formed the Congress Reform Committee along with C. Rajagopalachari and was elected as its first President.

== Later life ==
Reddiar resigned from the Congress Reform Committee (which had been renamed as Indian National Democratic Congress) when Rajagopalachari founded the Swatantra Party in 1959. Reddiar died of heart-attack on 14 January 1966 at the age of 56.
