= Kurai Onrum Illai =

Tamil devotional song

"Kurai Onrum Illai" (Tamil: குறை ஒன்றும் இல்லை, meaning No grievances have I) is a Tamil devotional song written by C. Rajagopalachari. The song set in Carnatic music was written in gratitude to Hindu God (Venkateswara and Krishna visualised as one) and compassionate mother.

Kurai Onrum Illai is one of the few songs written by Indian politician, freedom-fighter and Governor-General of India, Chakravarti Rajagopalachari.

The song was sung by M. S. Subbulakshmi in the Sri Venkateswara (Balaji) Pancharatna Mala LP-2 (Long Play Record) (1979/80). This song is unique because it does not assume the tone of devoted grants of prayer but one of thankfulness to God. The song comprises 3 stanzas each set in three different ragas of Shivaranjani, Kapi and Sindhu Bhairavi.

Kurai Onrum Illai is a very popular song in South India and is a regular in many Carnatic concerts. It became very famous after it was sung by M. S. Subbulakshmi.

== History ==
Rajagopalachari, or Rajaji as he was popularly known, was a religious Hindu and a devout Vaishnavite. Apart from his illustrious political career, he is also known to have authored books on history, religion, politics and Hindu mythology. His translations of the Ramayana and Mahabharata are considered classics and are used by American universities as a part of their syllabus on "Oriental Studies".

However, Rajaji is not a popular composer of Carnatic music and "Kurai Onrum Illai" is his sole Carnatic composition (with some help from Tamil scholar M.P.Somasundaram ( மீ.ப.சோமு) ) that has gained widespread recognition. The song depicts his intense devotion to God.

The composition was published in the Tamil magazine Kalki in 1967. The song became popular after it was sung as one of the pieces in the Long Play Record set, known as Sri Venkateswara (Balaji) Pancharatnamala by M. S. Subbulakshmi in 1979/80. Since then, the song has been widely appreciated and sung in most Carnatic concerts.

== Explanation and interpretation ==
This composition by Rajaji is one of its kind, in the sense that the author does not elicit any favour from God but only maintains that he has no regrets or dissatisfaction about anything in life. In this song, he regards both Lord Vishnu or Venkateswara of Tirupathi and his incarnation Lord Krishna to be one and the same and uses the names interchangeably.

== Popular culture ==
The same song was reused with slightly modified lyrics and instrumentation by Vidyasagar for the film Arai En 305-il Kadavul (2008).

The song was used with telling effect in Mudal Mudal Mudal Varai (M3V) and the song sung by Ms. Jaya.
