= Indian National Democratic Congress =

Indian political party

The Congress Reform Committee (CRC) was formed by a group of dissidents that left the Indian National Congress in the Madras State. The CRC was led by C. Rajagopalachari, who had been defeated by Kamaraj in the inner-party disputes over leadership of the Congress in Tamil Nadu. CRC was formed just one month before the 1957 elections to the Lok Sabha and the Madras state legislative assembly.

Soon CRC began cooperation with the All India Forward Bloc of U. Muthuramalingam Thevar. The CRC-AIFB combine contested 59 seats in the assembly election (54 candidates from CRC, 5 candidates from AIFB. One of the five AIFB candidates, P.K. Mookiah Thevar, stood as a CRC candidate). There was also an informal understanding with the Communist Party of India, which decided not to contest against the CRC in some constituencies.

The CRC-AIFB combine formulated a 12-point election manifesto. The CRC-AIFB alliance emerged as the major opposition alliance in these elections, but could not defeat the Congress government. CRC won 14 seats and AIFB three. Half of the seats won were from the Ramnad and Madurai districts.

Following the election, a joint 'CRC opposition' group was formed in the legislative assembly. This was done to counter the bid of the Dravida Munnetra Kazhagam (which had 16 seats) to hold the post of leader of opposition. Soon five independent assembly members joined the CRC opposition group. V.K. Ramaswamy Mudaliar was elected leader of the 'CRC opposition'.

On 28–29 September 1957 CRC held a state conference and reconstituted itself as the Indian National Democratic Congress. Notably, U. Muthuralingam Thevar, one of the inaugural speakers of the event, was arrested just after having delivered his speech.

In March 1959 elections to the Madurai municipality was held. An alliance of INDC, AIFB, CPI and the Dravida Munnetra Kazhagam was formed. Forward Bloc members stood as INDC candidates, denoting that the Tamil Nadu state unit of that party has virtually merged into INDC. 12 INDC candidates, 12 CPI candidates and 2 DMK candidates were elected against only 10 of the Congress. This was the first time the Congress lost its hold over the municipality after Independence. The INDC-AIFB-CPI-DMK front only lost in three constituencies where they had nominated independent candidates.

In July 1959 INDC merged into the Swatantra Party. Albeit representing virtually opposite positions on the left-right scale, the cooperation between the Forward Bloc and the Swatantra Party continued in the state. Forward Bloc members of the Tamil Nadu assembly sat in the Swatantra group and the group was led by Forward Bloc leader P.K. Mookiah Thevar.

== See also ==
- List of Indian National Congress breakaway parties

== Sources ==
- Bose, K.; Forward Bloc. Madras: 1988, Tamil Nadu Academy of Political Science. pp. 94–95, 119, 175–184, 212
