= C. Rajagopalachari =

Indian statesman and writer (1878–1972)

Chakravarti Rajagopalachari
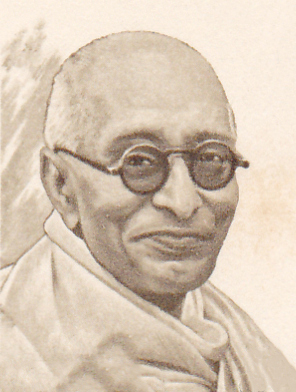
- Formal portrait, c. 1948

Governor-General of India
- In office 21 June 1948 – 26 January 1950
- Monarch: George VI
- Prime Minister: Jawaharlal Nehru
- Preceded by: The Earl Mountbatten of Burma
- Succeeded by: Rajendra Prasad as President of India

Union Minister of Home Affairs
- In office 17 December 1950 – 5 November 1951
- Prime Minister: Jawaharlal Nehru
- Preceded by: Vallabhbhai Patel
- Succeeded by: Kailash Nath Katju

Minister without portfolio
- In office 15 July 1950 – 17 December 1950
- Prime Minister: Jawaharlal Nehru

Governor of West Bengal
- In office 15 August 1947 – 21 June 1948
- Premier: Prafulla Chandra Ghosh; Bidhan Chandra Roy
- Preceded by: Position established Frederick Burrows as Governor of Bengal Presidency
- Succeeded by: Kailash Nath Katju

Chief Minister of Madras State
- In office 10 April 1952 – 13 April 1954
- Preceded by: P. S. Kumaraswamy Raja
- Succeeded by: K. Kamaraj

Premier of Madras Presidency
- In office 14 July 1937 – 9 October 1939
- Governor: The Lord Erskine
- Preceded by: Kurma Venkata Reddy Naidu
- Succeeded by: T. Prakasam
- Constituency: Leader of the State Legislative Council

Personal details
- Born: Chakravarti Rajagopalachari; 10 December 1878 Thorapalli, Madras Presidency, British Raj
- Died: 25 December 1972 (aged 94) Madras, Tamil Nadu, India
- Resting place: Rajaji Memorial
- Party: Swatantra Party (from 1959); Indian National Congress (1906-1942,1944-1957); Indian National Democratic Congress (1957–1959)
- Spouse: Alamelu Mangalamma (m. 1897; died 1916)
- Relations: Devdas Gandhi (son-in-law); Mahatma Gandhi (affinal); Rajmohan Gandhi (grandson); Ramchandra Gandhi (grandson); Gopalkrishna Gandhi (grandson)
- Children: 5, including C. R. Narasimhan
- Education: Bangalore University; Presidency College, Chennai
- Profession: Lawyer; Statesman; Writer; Indian independence activist
- Writing career
- Language: Tamil; English
- Notable works: Chakravarti Thirumagan (Ramayana); Vyasar Virundhu (Mahabharata); Stories for the Innocent; Hinduism; Doctrine and Way of Life
- Notable awards: See below

Chakravarti Rajagopalachari (10 December 1878 – 25 December 1972), popularly known as Rajaji or C.R., also known as Mootharignar Rajaji (Rajaji, the Scholar Emeritus), was an Indian statesman, writer, lawyer, and Indian independence activist. Rajagopalachari was the last Governor-General of India, serving until the abolition of that office upon India becoming a republic in 1950. He was the only Indian-born Governor-General or Viceroy of India; all previous holders of these posts had been British nationals. He was an accomplished writer and one of the first recipients of India's highest civilian award, the Bharat Ratna. He was close to both Gandhi and Nehru. He vehemently opposed the use of nuclear weapons, and was a proponent of world peace and disarmament, until his death at the age of 94 in 1972.

Rajagopalachari also served—at different times—as leader of the Indian National Congress, Premier of the Madras Presidency, Governor of West Bengal (he was serving in this post when appointed by the King to take over from Lord Mountbatten), a member of the national cabinet as Minister for Home Affairs of the Indian Union, and as Chief Minister of Madras State. Rajagopalachari founded the Swatantra Party in 1959.

Rajagopalachari was born in the Thorapalli village of Hosur taluk in the Krishnagiri district of Tamil Nadu. He was a sickly child, and his parents constantly feared that he might not live long. He was educated at Central College, Bengaluru, and Presidency College, Madras. In the 1900s he started legal practice at the Salem court. On entering politics, he became a member and later Chairperson of the Salem municipality. One of Mahatma Gandhi's earliest political lieutenants, he joined the Indian National Congress and participated in the agitations against the Rowlatt Act, joining the non-cooperation movement, the Vaikom Satyagraha, and the Civil Disobedience movement. In 1930, Rajagopalachari risked imprisonment when he led the Vedaranyam Salt Satyagraha in response to the Dandi March. In 1937, Rajagopalachari was elected Prime minister of the Madras Presidency and served until 1940, when he resigned due to Britain's declaration of war on Germany. He later advocated co-operation over Britain's war effort and opposed the Quit India Movement. He favoured talks with both Muhammad Ali Jinnah and the Muslim League and proposed what later came to be known as the C. R. formula. In 1946, Rajagopalachari was appointed Minister of Industry, Supply, Education and Finance in the Interim Government of India, and then as the Governor of West Bengal from 1947 to 1948, Governor-General of India from 1948 to 1950, Union Home Minister from 1951 to 1952 and as Chief Minister of Madras State from 1952 to 1954. In 1959, he resigned from the Indian National Congress and founded the Swatantra Party, which fought against Congress in the 1962, 1967 and 1971 elections. Rajagopalachari was instrumental in setting up a united Anti-Congress front in Madras State under C. N. Annadurai, which swept the 1967 elections. He died on 25 December 1972 at the age of 94 and received a state funeral.

Rajagopalachari was an accomplished writer who made lasting contributions to Indian English literature and is also credited with the composition of the song Kurai Onrum Illai set to Carnatic music. He pioneered temperance and temple entry movements in India and advocated Dalit upliftment. He has been criticized for introducing the compulsory study of Hindi and the Madras Scheme of Elementary Education in Madras State, which have been criticised as hereditary education policy designed to perpetuate caste hierarchy. Critics have often attributed his pre-eminence in politics to his standing as a favourite of both Mahatma Gandhi and Jawaharlal Nehru. Rajagopalachari was described by Gandhi as the "keeper of my conscience". During his lifetime, he also acquired the nickname 'Mango of Salem'.

== Early life ==
Rajagopalachari was born to Chakravarti Venkatarya Achari (Iyengar) and his wife Singaramma on 10 December 1878 in Thorapalli village on the outskirts of Hosur, in Hosur taluk, Krishnagiri district, Madras Presidency, British Raj. His father was the munsiff of Thorapalli. He hailed from a Hindu Brahmin family belonging to the Sri Vaishnava sect. The couple already had two sons, Narasimhachari and Srinivasa.

A weak and sickly child, Rajagopalachari was a constant worry to his parents who feared that he might not live long. As a young child, he was admitted to a village school in Thorapalli then at the age of five moved with his family to Hosur where Rajagopalachari enrolled at R. V. Government Boys Higher Secondary School. He passed his matriculation examinations in 1891 and graduated in arts from Central College, Bangalore in 1894. Rajagopalachari graduated in law from Presidency College, Madras in 1897.

Rajagopalachari married Alamelu Mangalamma in 1897 when she was ten years old and she gave birth to her son a day after her thirteenth birthday. The couple had five children, three sons: C. R. Narasimhan, C. R. Krishnaswamy, and C. R. Ramaswami, and two daughters: Lakshmi Gandhi (née Rajagopalachari) and Namagiri Ammal. Mangamma died in 1916 whereupon Rajagopalachari took sole responsibility for the care of his children. His son Chakravarti Rajagopalachari Narasimhan was elected to the Lok Sabha from Krishnagiri in the 1952 and 1957 elections and served as a member of parliament for Krishnagiri from 1952 to 1962. He later wrote a biography of his father. Rajagopalachari's daughter Lakshmi married Devdas Gandhi, son of Mahatma Gandhi while his grandsons include biographer Rajmohan Gandhi, philosopher Ramchandra Gandhi and former governor of West Bengal Gopalkrishna Gandhi. Rajagopalachari's great-grandson, Chakravarti Rajagopalachari Kesavan, is a spokesperson of the Congress Party and Trustee of the Tamil Nadu Congress Committee.

== Indian Independence Movement ==
Rajagopalachari's interest in public affairs and politics began when he commenced his legal practice in Salem in 1900. At the age of 28, he joined the Indian National Congress and participated as a delegate in the 1906 Calcutta session. Inspired by Indian independence activist Bal Gangadhar Tilak, he later became a member of the Salem municipality in 1911. In 1917, he was elected chairman of the municipality and served from 1917 to 1919 during which time he was responsible for the election of the first Dalit member of the Salem municipality. In 1917, he defended Indian independence activist P. Varadarajulu Naidu against charges of sedition and two years later participated in the agitations against the Rowlatt Act. Rajagopalachari was a close friend of the founder of Swadeshi Steam Navigation Company V. O. Chidambaram Pillai as well as greatly admired by Indian independence activists Annie Besant, Subramania Bharati and C. Vijayaraghavachariar.

After Mahatma Gandhi joined the Indian independence movement in 1919, Rajagopalachari became one of his followers. He participated in the non-cooperation movement and gave up his law practice. In 1921, he was elected to the Congress Working Committee and served as the General Secretary of the party before making his first major breakthrough as a leader during the 1922 Indian National Congress session at Gaya when he strongly opposed collaboration with the colonial administration and participation in the diarchial legislatures established by the Government of India Act 1919. While Gandhi was in prison, Rajagopalachari led the group of "No-Changers", individuals against contesting elections for the Imperial Legislative Council and other provincial legislative councils, in opposition to the "Pro-changers" who advocated council entry. When the motion was put to the vote, the "No-changers" won by 1,748 to 890 votes resulting in the resignation of important Congress leaders including Pandit Motilal Nehru and C. R. Das, the President of the Indian National Congress. When the Indian National Congress split in 1923, Rajagopalachari was a member of the Civil Disobedience Enquiry Committee. He was also involved in the Vaikom Satyagraha movement against untouchability during 1924–25. In a public speech on 27 May 1924, he reassured the anxious upper caste Hindus in Vaikom, "Mahatmaji does not want the caste system abolished but holds that untouchability should be abolished...Mahatmaji does not want you to dine with the Thiyyas or the Pulayas. What he wants is that we must be prepared to go near or touch other human beings as you go near a cow or a horse".

In the early 1930s, Rajagopalachari emerged as one of the major leaders of the Tamil Nadu Congress. When Gandhi organised the Dandi march in 1930, Rajagopalachari broke the salt laws at Vedaranyam, near Nagapattinam, along with Indian independence activist Sardar Vedaratnam. Rajagopalachari was sentenced to six-months of rigorous imprisonment and was sent to the Trichinopoly Central Prison. He was subsequently elected President of the Tamil Nadu Congress Committee. Following the enactment of the Government of India Act in 1935, Rajagopalachari was instrumental in getting the Indian National Congress to participate in the 1937 general elections.

== Madras Presidency 1937–1939 ==
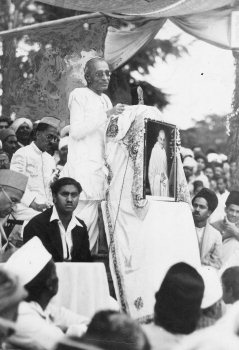
Premier Rajagopalachari at a rally in Ootacamund, 1939.

The Indian National Congress first came to power in the Madras Presidency (also called Madras Province by the British), following the Madras elections of 1937. Except for a six-year period when Madras was under the Governor's direct rule, the Congress administered the Madras Presidency until India became independent on 15 August 1947 as the Dominion of India. At the age of 59, Rajagopalachari won the Madras University seat and entered the Assembly as the first Premier of the Madras Presidency from the Congress party.

In 1938, when Dalit members of the Madras Legislative Council proposed a Temple Entry Bill, Congress Prime Minister Rajagopalachari asked them to withdraw it. Rajagopalachari issued the Temple Entry Authorization and Indemnity Act 1939, under which restrictions were removed on Dalits and Shanars entering Hindu temples. In the same year, the Meenakshi temple at Madurai was also opened to the Dalits and Shanars. In March 1938, Rajagopalachari introduced the Agricultural Debt Relief Act, to ease the burden of debt on the province's peasant population.

He also introduced prohibition, along with a sales tax to compensate for the loss of government revenue that resulted from the ban on alcohol. The Provincial Government shut down hundreds of government-run primary schools, citing lack of funds. His opponents said that this deprived many low-caste and Dalit students of their education. His opponents also attributed casteist motives to his government's implementation of Gandhi's Nai Talim scheme into the education system.

Rajagopalachari's tenure as Prime Minister of Madras is largely remembered for the compulsory introduction of Hindi in educational institutions, which made him highly unpopular. This measure sparked off widespread anti-Hindi protests, which led to violence in some places and the jailing of over 1,200 men, women and children who took part in the unrest. Two protesters, Thalamuthu Nadar and Natarasan, were killed during the protests. Dravidar Kazhagam founder Periyar E.V. Ramasamy opposed the decision of C. Rajagopalachari to make learning Hindi compulsory in schools in 1937. During the anti-Hindi agitations, Rajagopalachari was constantly identified as an enemy and destroyer of Tamil thai. The opposition to Rajagopalachari grew because he continued to openly criticize the Anti-Hindi agitation of 1937–40 in the most elitist terms and casually ignored the death of a young protester in 1938 when he was asked about it.

In 1940, Congress ministers resigned in protest over the declaration of war on Germany without their consent, leaving the governor to take over the reins of the administration. On 21 February 1940, the unpopular new law on the use of Hindi was quickly repealed by the Governor of Madras. Despite its numerous shortcomings, Madras under Rajagopalachari was still considered by political historians as the best-administered province in British India.

== Second World War ==
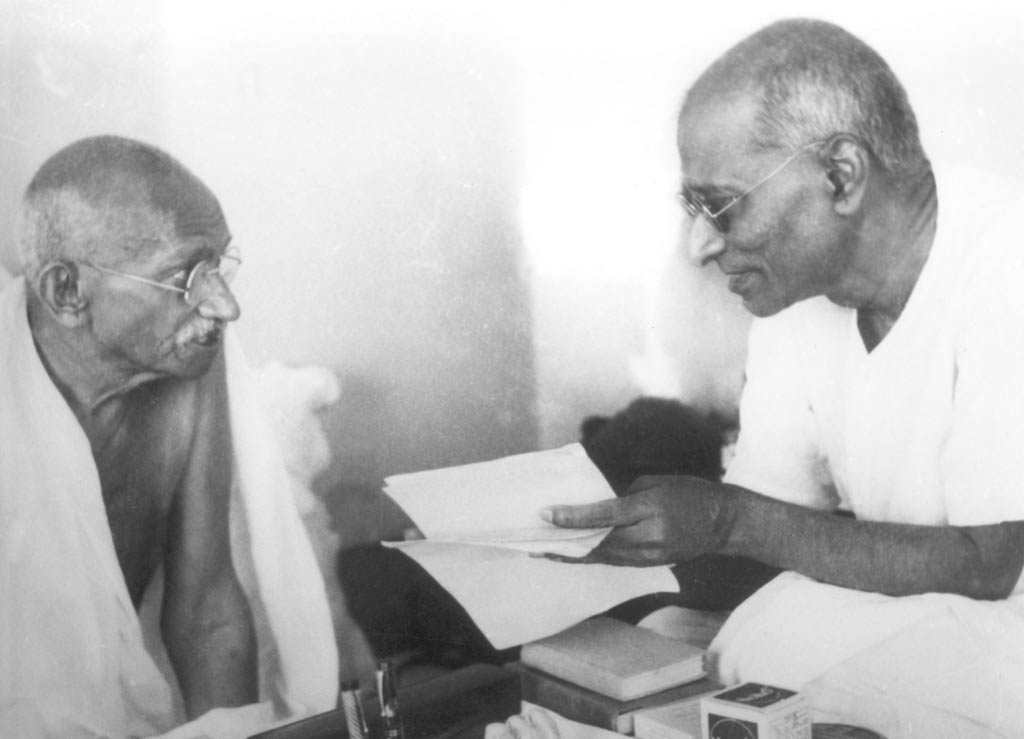
Chakravarti with Mahatma Gandhi during the Gandhi-Jinnah talks, 1944. Gandhi described Chakravarti as his "keeper of my conscience"

Some months after the outbreak of the Second World War, Rajagopalachari resigned as premier along with other members of his cabinet in protest at the declaration of war by the Viceroy of India. Rajagopalachari was arrested in December 1940, in accordance with the Defence of India rules, and sentenced to one year in prison. However, subsequently, Rajagopalachari differed in opposition to the British war effort. He also opposed the Quit India Movement and instead advocated dialogue with the British. He reasoned that passivity and neutrality would be harmful to India's interests at a time when the country was threatened with invasion. He also advocated dialogue with the Muslim League, which was demanding the partition of India. He subsequently resigned from the party and the assembly following differences over resolutions passed by the Madras Congress legislative party and disagreements with the leader of the Madras provincial Congress K. Kamaraj.

Following the end of the war in 1945, elections followed in the Madras Presidency in 1946. During the last years of the war, Kamaraj was requested by Nehru, Sardar Vallabhbhai Patel and Maulana Abul Kalam Azad to make Rajagopalachari the Premier of Madras Presidency. Kamaraj, President of the Tamil Nadu Congress Committee, was forced to make Tanguturi Prakasam as Prime Ministerial candidate, by the elected members, to prevent Rajagopalachari from winning. However, Rajagopalachari did not contest the elections, and Prakasam was elected.

Rajagopalachari was instrumental in initiating negotiations between Gandhi and Jinnah. In 1944, he proposed a solution to the Indian Constitutional tangle. In the same year, he proposed an "absolute majority" threshold of 55 per cent when deciding whether a district should become part of India or Pakistan, triggering a huge controversy among nationalists.

From 1946 to 1947, Rajagopalachari served as the Minister for Industry, Supply, Education, and Finance in the Interim Government headed by Jawaharlal Nehru.

== Governor of West Bengal 1947–1948 ==
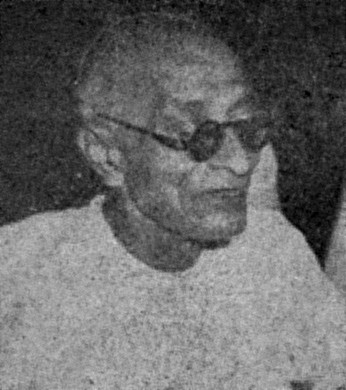
Picture of C. Rajagopalachari in 1948.

When India and Pakistan attained independence, the province of Bengal was partitioned into two, with West Bengal becoming part of India and East Bengal part of Pakistan. At that time, Rajagopalachari was appointed as the first Governor of West Bengal.

Disliked by the Bengali political class for his criticism of Subhas Chandra Bose during the 1939 Tripuri Congress session, Rajagopalachari's appointment as Governor of West Bengal was protested by Bose's brother Sarat Chandra Bose. During his tenure as governor, Rajagopalachari's priorities were to deal with refugees and to bring peace and stability in the aftermath of the Calcutta riots. He declared his commitment to neutrality and justice at a meeting of Muslim businessmen: "Whatever may be my defects or lapses, let me assure you that I shall never disfigure my life with any deliberate acts of injustice to any community whatsoever." Rajagopalachari was also strongly opposed to proposals to include areas from Bihar and Odisha as part of the province of West Bengal. One such proposal by the editor of a newspaper led to the reply:

"I see that you are not able to restrain the policy of agitation over inter-provincial boundaries. It is easy to yield to the current pressure of opinion and it is difficult to impose on enthusiastic people any policy of restraint. But I earnestly plead that we should do all we can to prevent ill-will from hardening into a chronic disorder. We have enough ill-will and prejudice to cope with. Must we hasten to create further fissiparous forces?"

Despite the general attitude of the Bengali political class, Rajagopalachari was highly regarded and respected by Chief Minister Prafulla Chandra Ghosh and his ministry.

== Governor-General of India 1948–1950 ==
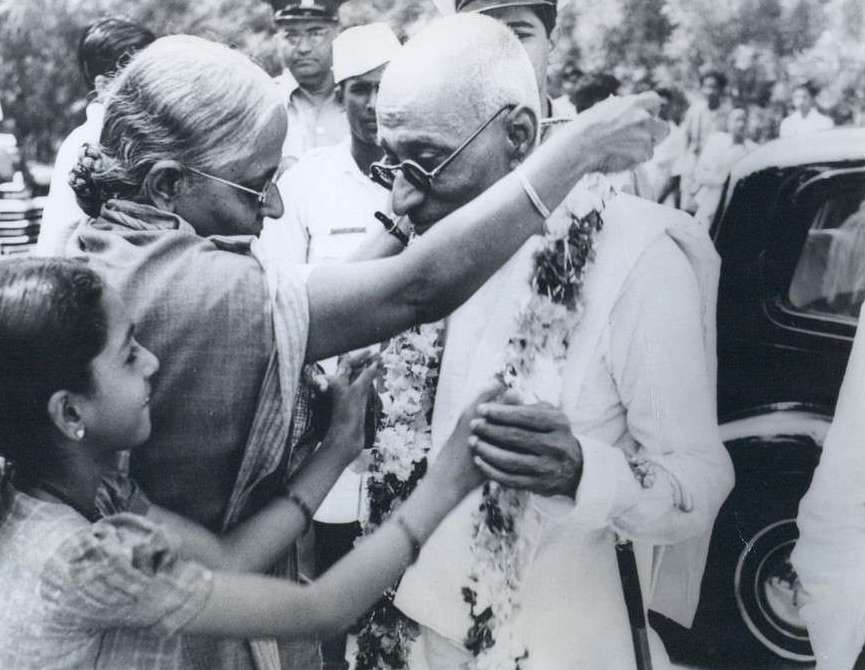
During a 1948 tour of southern India, women in Mysore removing their gold necklaces and giving them to Rajagopalachari as a sign of honour.

From 10 until 24 November 1947, Rajagopalachari served as Acting Governor-General of India in the absence of the Governor-General Lord Mountbatten, who was on leave in England to attend the marriage of Princess Elizabeth to Mountbatten's nephew Prince Philip. Rajagopalachari led a very simple life in the viceregal palace, washing his own clothes and polishing his own shoes. Impressed with his abilities, Mountbatten made Rajagopalachari his second choice to succeed him after Vallabhbhai Patel, when he was to leave India in June 1948. Rajagopalachari was eventually chosen as the governor-general when Nehru disagreed with Mountbatten's first choice, as did Patel himself. He was initially hesitant but accepted when Nehru wrote to him, "I hope you will not disappoint us. We want you to help us in many ways. The burden on some of us is more than we can carry." Rajagopalachari then served as Governor-General of India from June 1948 until 26 January 1950 and was not only the last Governor-General of India but the only Indian citizen ever to hold the office.

By the end of 1949, an assumption was made that Rajagopalachari, already Governor-General, would continue as president. Backed by Nehru, Rajagopalachari wanted to stand for the presidential election but later withdrew, due to the opposition of a section of the Indian National Congress mostly made up of North Indians who were concerned about Rajagopalachari's non-participation during the Quit India Movement.

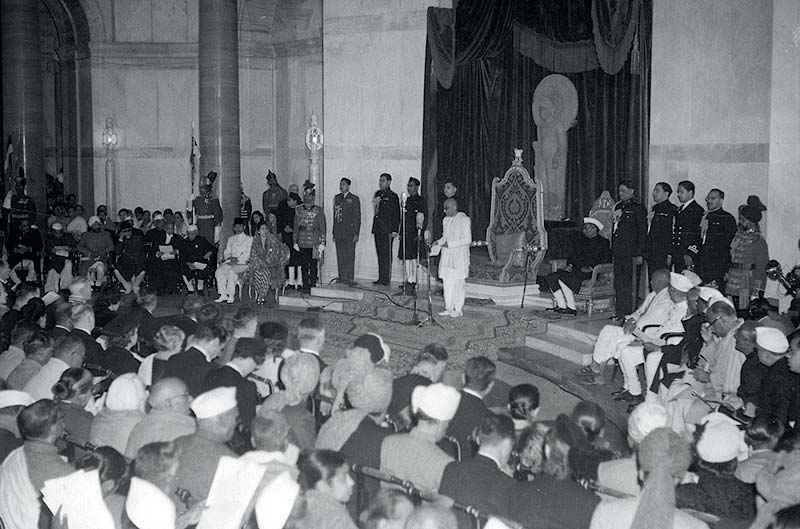
Rajagopalachari as Governor-General of India proclaims the Republic of India on 26 January 1950

== Role in Constituent Assembly ==
He was elected to the Constituent Assembly of India from Madras. He was a part of Advisory Committee and Sub-Committee on Minorities. He debated on issues relating to rights of religious denominations.

== In Nehru's Cabinet ==
At Nehru's invitation, in 1950, Rajagopalachari joined the Union Cabinet as Minister without Portfolio where he served as a buffer between Nehru and Home Minister Sardar Patel and on occasion offered to mediate between the two. Following Patel's death on 15 December 1950, Rajagopalachari was finally made Home Affairs Minister and went on to serve for nearly 10 months. As had his predecessor, he warned Nehru about the expansionist designs of China and expressed regret over the Tibet problem. He also expressed concern over demands for new linguistically based states, arguing that they would generate differences amongst the people.

By the end of 1951, the differences between Nehru and Rajagopalachari came to the fore. While Nehru perceived the Hindu Mahasabha to be the greatest threat to the nascent republic, Rajagopalachari held the opinion that the Communists posed the greatest danger. He also adamantly opposed Nehru's decision to commute the death sentences passed on those involved in the Telangana uprising and his strong pro-Soviet leanings. Tired of being persistently over-ruled by Nehru concerning critical decisions, Rajagopalachari submitted his resignation on the "grounds of ill-health" and returned to Madras.

== Madras State 1952–1954 ==
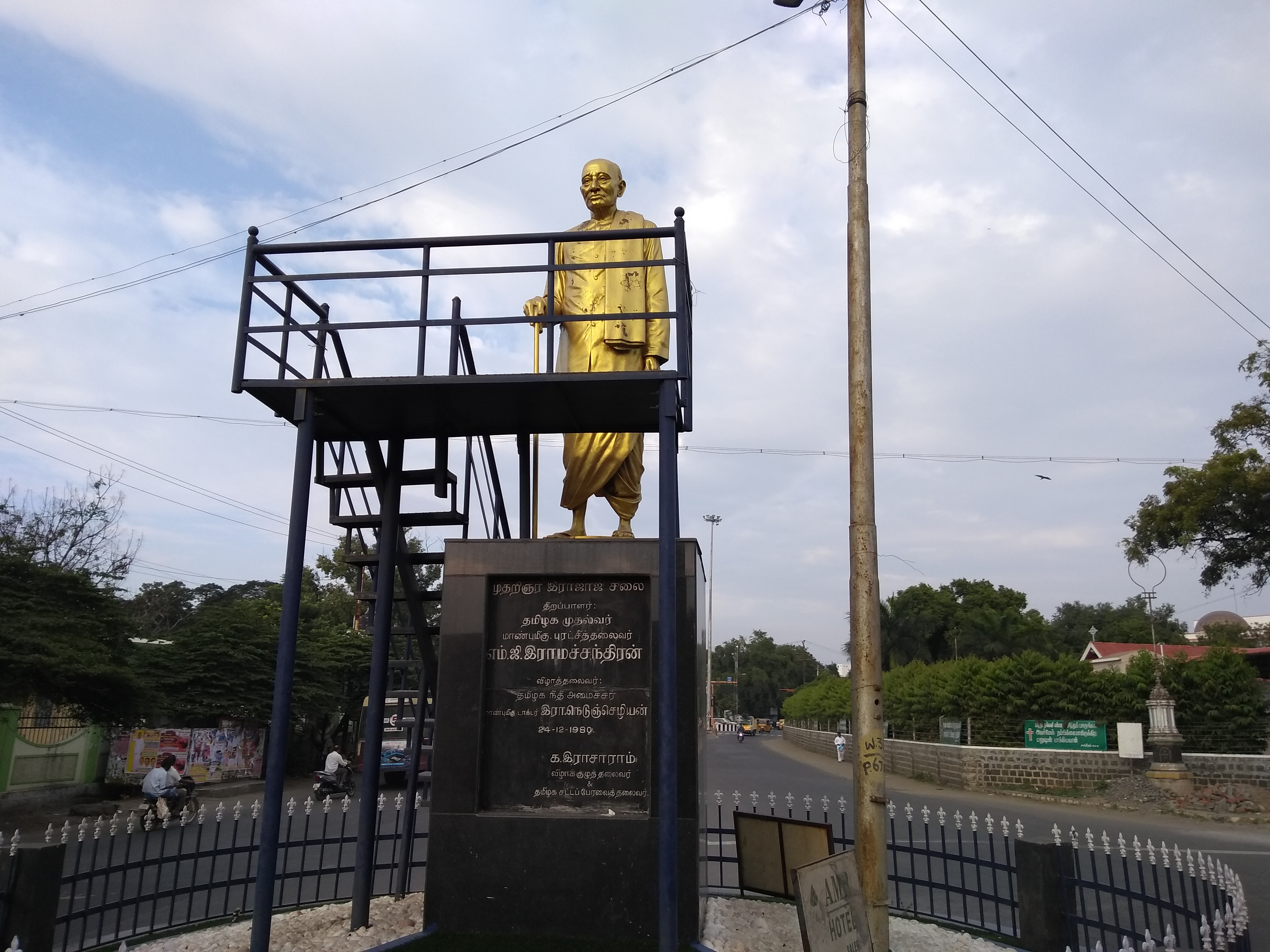
C. Rajagopalachari's Statue in Salem.

In the 1952 Madras elections, the Indian National Congress was reduced to a minority in the state assembly with a coalition led by the Communist Party of India winning most of the seats. The Congress did not want the Communists taking power or to impose Governor's rule in the state. It brought Rajagopalachari out of retirement to form the government as a consensus candidate. On 31 March 1952, Kamaraj presented a resolution, proposing the election of Rajagopalachari as the leader of the Madras Legislature Congress party. The resolution was approved by the party and Kamaraj revealed that Rajagopalachari had been reluctant to accept the responsibility as Chief Minister and the leader of the Madras Legislature Congress party as his health was fragile and added that by acceding to the request of the party, Rajagopalachari had put country before self. Rajagopalachari did not contest the by-election and on 10 April 1952, Madras Governor Sri Prakasa appointed him as Chief Minister by nomination as MLC without consulting either the Prime Minister Nehru or the ministers in the Madras state cabinet. It was the first time when the governor office was accused of acting inappropriately after independence. P. C. Alexander, a former governor of Tamil Nadu and Maharashtra wrote about the appointment of Rajagopalachari as "The most conspicuous case of constitutional impropriety by the Governor in the exercise of discretion to choose the Chief Minister..."

On 3 July 1952, Rajagopalachari was then able to prove that he had a majority in the assembly by luring MLAs from opposition parties and independents to join the Indian National Congress. 19 members of the Tamil Nadu Toilers Party led by S. S. Ramasami Padayachi, 5 members of the Madras State Muslim League and 6 members of Commonweal Party also provided their support to Rajagopalachari to prevent the Communists from gaining power. Nehru was furious and wrote to Rajagopalachari saying "the one thing we must avoid giving is the impression that we stick to office and we want to keep others out at all costs." Rajagopalachari, however, refused to contest a by-election and remained as a nominated member of the Legislative Council.

During Rajagopalachari's tenure as Chief Minister, a powerful movement for a separate Andhra State, comprising the Telugu-speaking districts of the Madras State, gained a foothold. On 19 October 1952, an Indian independence activist and social worker from Madras named Potti Sriramulu embarked on a hunger strike reiterating the demands of the separatists and calling for the inclusion of Madras city within the proposed state. Rajagopalachari remained unmoved by Sriramulu's action and refused to intervene. After fasting for days, Sriramulu eventually died on 15 December 1952, triggering riots in Madras city and the Telugu-speaking districts of the state. Initially, both Rajagopalachari and Prime Minister Nehru were against the creation of linguistically demarcated states but as the law and order situation in the state deteriorated, both were forced to accept the demands. Andhra State was thus created on 1 October 1953 from the Telugu-speaking districts of Madras, with its capital at Kurnool. However, the boundaries of the new state were determined by a commission which decided against the inclusion of Madras city. Though the commission's report suggested the option of having Madras as the temporary capital of Andhra State to allow smooth partitioning of the assets and the secretariat, Rajagopalachari refused to allow Andhra State to have Madras even for a day.

On 7 June 1952, Rajagopalachari ended the procurement policy and food rationing in the state, abolishing all price and quota controls. His decision was a rejection of a planned economy in favour of a free market economy. He also introduced measures to regulate the running of universities in the state.

In 1953, he introduced a new education scheme known as the "Modified Scheme of Elementary education 1953", which reduced schooling for elementary school students from five hours to three hours per day and suggested that boys to learn the family crafts from their father and girls housekeeping from their mothers. Rajaji had not even consulted his own cabinet or members of the legislative assembly before the scheme's implementation. He said: "Did Shankara or Ramanuja announce their philosophy after consulting others?". The scheme came in for sharp criticism and evoked strong protests from the Dravidian parties. Two amendments were proposed against the scheme at the Madras State legislative assembly. One advocated for a study by an expert group, while another advocated for the scheme's abolition. Both sides launched publicity campaigns in June 1953. At the Adyar riverside, Rajaji made a speech to the washermen. He stated kuladharma, or each clan's or caste's social obligation. He delivered talks and made radio broadcasts to clarify his views. The Dravida Munnetra Kazhagam dubbed the scheme Kula Kalvi Thittam or Hereditary Education Policy which was put forward with the intention of perpetuating the caste system. and attempted to organize massive demonstrations outside Rajagopalachari's house on 13 and 14 July 1953. The scheme was criticized from political leaders from all sides as casteist. Opponents and critics claimed that the system would reinforce deep-seated, caste-based inequality in society. They regarded the plan as an attempt to place children from the upper caste in an advantageous place than children from oppressed groups, who were simply supposed to learn their father's job. Rajagopalachari argued,

It is a mistake to imagine that the school is within the walls. The whole village is a school. The village polytechnic is there, every branch of it, the dhobi, the wheelwright, the cobbler.

The Scheme was stayed by the house and the Parulekar Committee was commissioned to review the scheme. The committee found the scheme to be sound and endorsed the Government's position. India's President Rajendra Prasad and Prime Minister Jawaharlal Nehru also offered their support to the scheme.

Rajagopalachari closed down 6000 schools, citing financial constraints. Kamaraj opposed this policy and eventually opened 12,000 schools in his tenure.

Despite his government's efforts to postpone the Modified Scheme of Elementary Education 1953, public resistance grew, particularly in response to initiatives that sought to establish Hindi as the national language. The rising unpopularity of his government forced Rajagopalachari to resign on 26 March 1954, as the President of the Madras Congress Legislature Party (CLP) thereby precipitating new elections. Kamaraj's name was proposed by P. Varadarajalu Naidu for the post of CLP leader. M. Bakthavatsalam, another senior Congress leader, fielded C. Subramaniam. On 30 March 1954, the election took place, Subramaniam could garner only 41 votes to Kamaraj's 93 and lost the elections. Rajagopalachari eventually resigned as Chief Minister on 13 April 1954, attributing the decision to poor health.

== Split from Congress – parting of ways ==
Following his resignation as Chief Minister, Rajagopalachari took a temporary break from active politics and instead devoted his time to literary pursuits. He wrote a Tamil re-telling of the Sanskrit epic Ramayana which appeared as a serial in the Tamil magazine Kalki from 23 May 1954 to 6 November 1955. The episodes were later collected and published as Chakravarti Thirumagan, a book which won Rajagopalachari the 1958 Sahitya Academy award in Tamil language.

Rajagopalachari tendered his official resignation from the Indian National Congress and along with a number of other dissidents organised the Congress Reform Committee (CRC) in January 1957. K. S. Venkatakrishna Reddiar was elected president and the party fielded candidates in 55 constituencies in the 1957 state assembly elections, to emerge as the second largest party in Madras state with 13 seats in the legislative assembly. The Congress Reform Committee also contested 12 Lok Sabha seats during the 1957 Indian elections. The committee became a fully-fledged political party and was renamed the Indian National Democratic Congress at a state conference held in Madurai on September 28–29, 1957.

On 4 June 1959, shortly after the Nagpur session of the Indian National Congress, Rajagopalachari, along with Murari Vaidya of the newly established Forum of Free Enterprise (FFE) and Minoo Masani, a classical liberal and critic of socialist Nehru, announced the formation of the new Swatantra Party at a meeting in Madras. Conceived by disgruntled heads of former princely states such as the Raja of Ramgarh, the Maharaja of Kalahandi and the Maharajadhiraja of Darbhanga, the party was conservative in character. Later, N. G. Ranga, K. M. Munshi, Field Marshal K. M. Cariappa and the Maharaja of Patiala joined the effort. Rajagopalachari, Masani and Ranga also tried but failed to involve Jayaprakash Narayan in the initiative.

In his short essay "Our Democracy", Rajagopalachari explained the necessity for a right-wing alternative to the Congress by saying:

since... the Congress Party has swung to the Left, what is wanted is not an ultra or outer-Left [viz. the CPI or the Praja Socialist Party, PSP], but a strong and articulate Right

Rajagopalachari also insisted that the opposition must:

operate not privately and behind the closed doors of the party meeting, but openly and periodically through the electorate.

He outlined the goals of the Swatantra Party through twenty one "fundamental principles" in the foundation document. The party stood for equality and opposed government control over the private sector. Rajagopalachari sharply criticised the bureaucracy and coined the term "licence-permit Raj" to describe Nehru's elaborate system of permissions and licences required for an individual to set up a private enterprise. Rajagopalachari's personality became a rallying point for the party.

In 1961, Rajagopalachari criticized Operation Vijay, the Indian military action in which Portuguese rule in Goa was forcibly ended and the territory was incorporated into India, writing that India had "totally lost the moral power to raise her voice against militarism" and had undermined the power and prestige of the United Nations Security Council. According to Rajagopalachari, while Portuguese rule in Goa had been an "offense to Indian nationalism", it was not a greater offense than the Chinese occupation of territories claimed by India or the social evil of untouchability, and the "great adventure" of seizing Goa undermined India's devotion to Gandhian principles of non-violence.

Rajagopalachari's efforts to build an anti-Congress front led to a patch up with his former adversary C. N. Annadurai of the Dravida Munnetra Kazhagam. During the late 1950s and early 1960s, Annadurai grew close to Rajagopalachari and sought an alliance with the Swatantra Party for the 1962 Madras legislative assembly elections. Although there were occasional electoral pacts between the Swatantra Party and the Dravida Munnetra Kazhagam (DMK), Rajagopalachari remained non-committal on a formal tie-up with the DMK due to its existing alliance with Communists whom he dreaded. The Swatantra Party contested 94 seats in the Madras state assembly elections and won six as well as won 18 parliamentary seats in the 1962 Lok Sabha elections.

== 1965 Anti-Hindi agitations in Madras ==
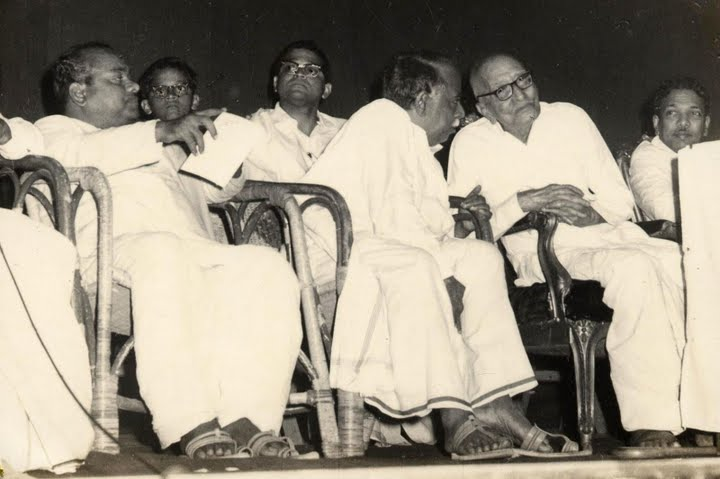
DMK leaders K. A. Mathiazhagan, V.P. Raman, C.N. Annadurai and M. Karunanidhi with Swatantra Party founder C. Rajagopalachari.

On 26 January 1950, the Government of India adopted Hindi as the official language of the country, but because of objections in non-Hindi-speaking areas, it introduced a provision tentatively making English the second official language on a par with Hindi for a stipulated fifteen-year period to facilitate a switch to Hindi in non-Hindi speaking states. From 26 January 1965 onwards, Hindi was to become the sole official language of the Indian Union and people in non-Hindi speaking regions were compelled to learn Hindi. This led to vehement opposition and just before Republic Day, severe anti-Hindi protests broke out in Madras State. Rajagopalachari had earlier been sharply critical of the recommendations made by the Official Languages Commission in 1957. On 28 January 1956, Rajagopalachari signed a resolution along with Annadurai and Periyar endorsing the continuation of English as the official language. At an All-India Language Conference held on 8 March 1958, he declared: "Hindi is as much foreign to non-Hindi speaking people as English [is] to the protagonists of Hindi". When the Anti-Hindi agitations broke out in 1965, Rajagopalachari completely reversed his 1938 support for the introduction of Hindi and took a strongly anti-Hindi stand in support of the protests, coining the slogan 'English Ever, Hindi Never'. On 17 January 1965, he convened the Madras state Anti-Hindi conference in Tiruchirapalli. angrily declaring that Part XVII of the Constitution of India which declared that Hindi was the official language should "be heaved and thrown into the Arabian Sea."

== 1967 elections ==
The fourth elections to the Madras Legislative assembly were held in February 1967. At the age of 88, Rajagopalachari worked to forge a united opposition to the Indian National Congress through a tripartite alliance between the Dravida Munnetra Kazhagam, the Swatantra Party and the Forward Bloc. The Congress party was defeated in Madras for the first time in 30 years and the coalition led by Dravida Munnetra Kazhagam came to power. C. N. Annadurai served as Chief Minister from 6 March 1967 until his death on 3 February 1969. Rajagopalachari delivered a moving eulogy to Annadurai at his funeral.

The Swatantra Party also did well in elections in other states and to the Lok Sabha, the directly elected lower house of the Parliament of India. It won 45 Lok Sabha seats in the 1967 general elections and emerged as the single largest opposition party. The principal opposition party in the states of Rajasthan and Gujarat, it also formed a coalition government in Odisha and had a significant presence in Andhra Pradesh, Tamil Nadu and Bihar.

== Later years and death ==
In 1971, Annadurai's successor M. Karunanidhi relaxed prohibition laws in Tamil Nadu due to the poor financial situation of the state. Rajagopalachari pleaded with him not to repeal prohibition but to no avail and as a result, the Swatantra Party withdrew its support for the state government and instead allied with the Congress (O), a breakaway faction of the Indian National Congress led by Kamaraj.

In January 1971, a three-party anti-Congress coalition was established by the Congress (O), Jan Sangh and the Samyukta Socialist Party then on 8 January, the national executive of the Swatantra Party took the unanimous decision to join the coalition. The dissident parties formed an alliance called the National Democratic Front and fought against the Indian National Congress led by Indira Gandhi in the 1971 Indian general elections. However, the alliance fared badly. The Swatantra Party's tally was reduced to 8 seats from 23 in the 1967 elections. The decline of the Swatantra Party was also visible in the 1971 Tamil Nadu Legislative assembly elections in which it won just 19 seats down from 27 in the 1967 elections.

By November 1972, Rajagopalachari's health had begun to decline and on 17 December the same year, a week after his 94th birthday, he was admitted to the Government Hospital, Madras suffering from uraemia, dehydration and a urinary infection. In the hospital, he was visited by Chief Minister M. Karunanidhi, V. R. Nedunchezhiyan, V. V. Giri, Periyar and other state and national leaders. Rajagopalachari's condition deteriorated in the following days as he frequently lost consciousness and he died at 5:44 pm on 25 December 1972 at the age of 94. His son, C. R. Narasimhan, was at his bedside at the time of his death reading him verses from a Hindu holy book. He was a widower for 56 years, and also outlived a son and both his sons-in-law. At the funeral of C. Rajagopalachari, Periyar E. V. Ramasamy, seated in his wheelchair and visibly emotional, remained until the end, reflecting the cordial personal relationship the two shared despite their ideological differences.

On his death, condolences poured in from all corners of the country. Indira Gandhi, the then Prime Minister of India commented:

Mr. Rajagopalachari was one of the makers of new India, a sincere patriot, a man whose penetrating intellect and moral sense added depth to national affairs. His analysis, his anticipation, his administrative acumen and his courage to steer an unpopular course if he felt the need, marked him as a statesman and made an impact on the national history at several crucial junctures. He had held the highest positions and lent distinction to every office.

— Swarajya, 27 January 1973

== Contributions to literature and music ==
An accomplished writer both in his mother tongue Tamil as well as English, Rajagopalachari was the founder of the Salem Literary Society and regularly participated in its meetings. In 1922, he published Siraiyil Tavam (Meditation in jail), a day-to-day account of his first imprisonment by the colonial government from 21 December 1921 to 20 March 1922.

Rajagopalachari started the Tamil Scientific Terms Society in 1916, a group that coined new words in Tamil for terms connected to botany, chemistry, physics, astronomy and mathematics. It received a mixed reception because it relied on Sanskrit roots to coin new Tamil words.

In 1951, he wrote an abridged retelling of the Mahabharata in English, followed by one of the Ramayana in 1957. Earlier, in 1961, he had translated Kambar's Tamil Ramayana into English. In 1965, he translated the Thirukkural into English and also wrote books on the Bhagavad Gita and the Upanishads in English as well as works on Socrates and Marcus Aurelius in Tamil. Rajagopalachari often regarded his literary works as the best service he had rendered to the people. In 1958, he was awarded the Sahitya Akademi Award for works in the Tamil language for his retelling of the Ramayana – Chakravarti Thirumagan. He was also one of the founders of the Bharatiya Vidya Bhavan, an organisation dedicated to the promotion of education and Indian culture. In 1959, the Bharatiya Vidya Bhavan published his book: "Hinduism: Doctrine and Way of Life".

Apart from his literary works, Rajagopalachari also composed a devotional song "Kurai Onrum Illai" devoted to Lord Venkateswara, a song set to music and a regular at Carnatic concerts. Rajagopalachari composed a benediction hymn sung by M. S. Subbulakshmi at the United Nations General Assembly in 1967.

== Personal life ==
Rajagopalachari was known for his opposition to self‐indulgence. He was a strict vegetarian and a teetotaller. He was at one time secretary of the Prohibition League of India and managed the Congress party's anti-alcohol campaign. Rajagopalachari attended the 15th World Vegetarian Congress in 1957.

In English he authored several books, Hinduism: Doctrine and Way of Life, The Voice of the Uninvolved and Fables and Short Stories.

== Awards and honours ==
=== National honours ===
- India:
  - Bharat Ratna (1954)

=== Literary awards ===
- Sahitya Akademi Award (1958)
- Sahitya Akademi Fellowship (1969)

== Legacy ==
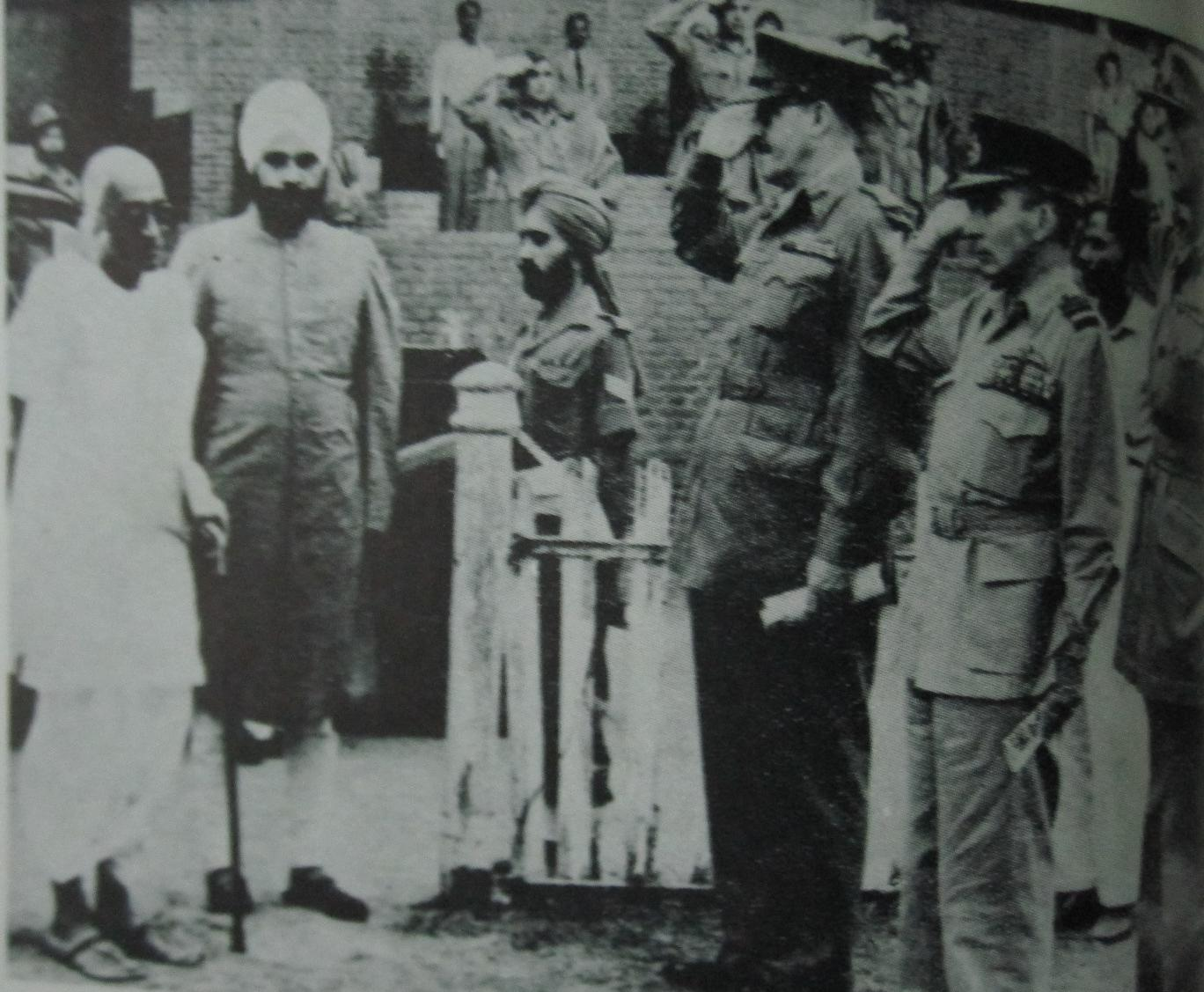
Rajagopalachari with Defence Minister Baldev Singh and the chiefs of Staffs of Indian Armed Forces in 1948.

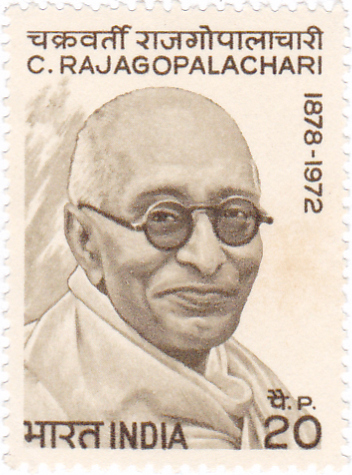
Chakravarthi Rajagopalachari 1973 stamp of India

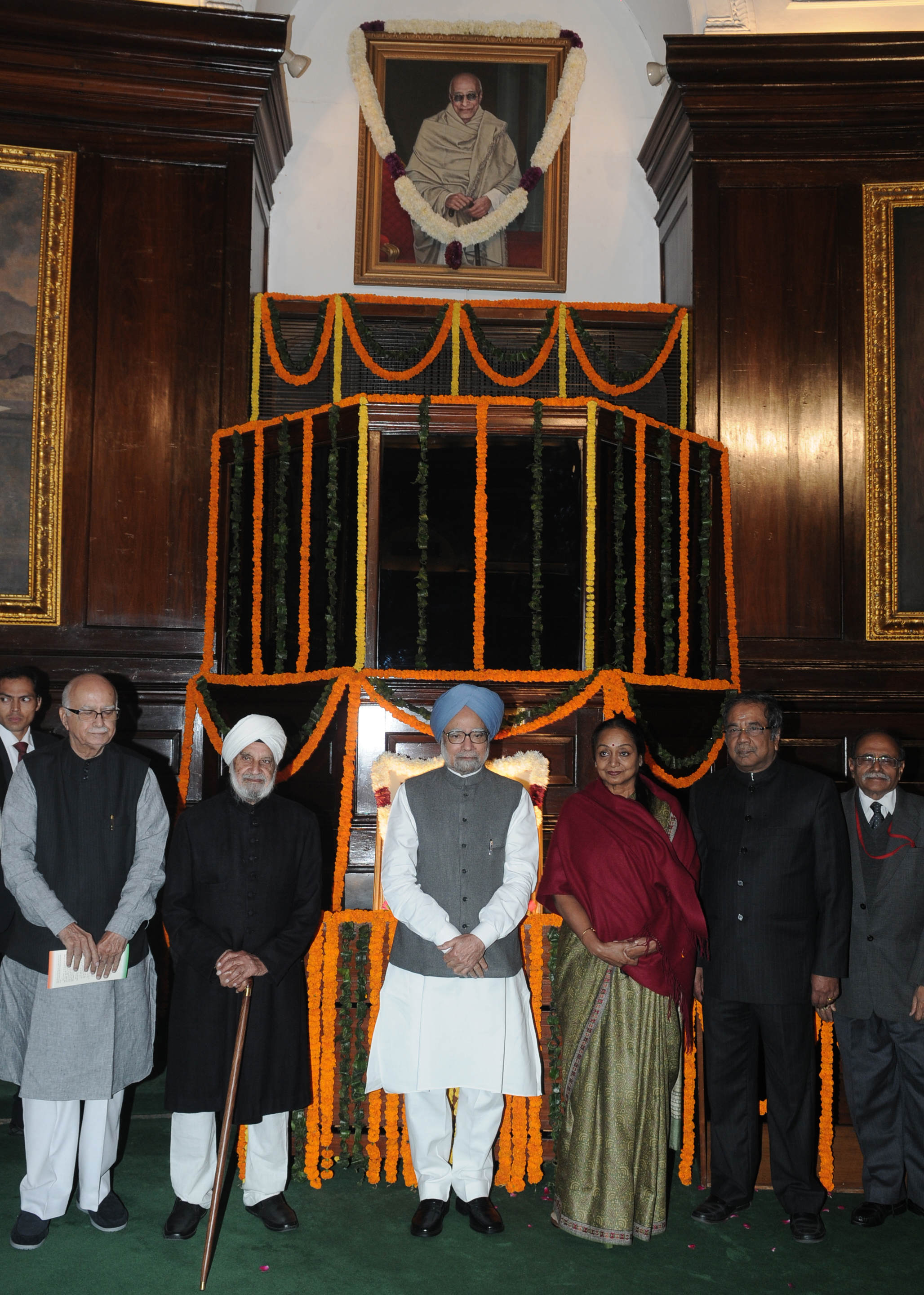
A portrait of C. Rajagopalachari at the Parliament House in New Delhi. Then PM Manmohan Singh, the Speaker, Lok Sabha, Meira Kumar, the chairman, BJP Parliamentary Party, Lal Krishna Advani and other dignitaries paid homage at the portrait of Rajagopalachari, on his Birth Anniversary on 10 December 2011.

In 1954, during US Vice-president Richard Nixon's nineteen country Asian tour, he was lectured by Rajagopalachari on the consuming emotional quality of nuclear weapons. The pair discussed spiritual life, particularly reincarnation and predestination. Nixon wrote three pages of notes recording Rajagopalachari's words, claiming in his memoirs thirty-six years later that the afternoon "had such a dramatic effect on me that I used many of his thoughts in my speeches over the next several years."

While on a tour to the United States as a member of the Gandhi Peace Foundation delegation, in September 1962, Rajagopalachari visited American President John F. Kennedy at the White House. Rajagopalachari warned Kennedy of the dangers of embarking on an arms race, even one which the US could win. At the end of the meeting Kennedy remarked "This meeting had the most civilizing influence on me. Seldom have I heard a case presented with such precision, clarity and elegance of language". On 1 May 1955, Rajagopalachari appealed to the Government of India to cancel receipt of aid from America if the country continued with its nuclear tests. India's use of military force against Portugal to capture the Portuguese enclave of Goa was criticised by Rajagopalachari who said of the operation and subsequent acts of international diplomacy, "India has totally lost the moral power to raise her voice against the use of military power."

E. M. S. Namboodiripad, a prominent Communist Party leader, once remarked that Rajagopalachari was the Congress leader he respected the most despite the fact he was also someone with whom he had the most differences. Of Rajagopalachari, Periyar, one of his foremost political rivals remarked "he was a leader unique and unequaled, who lived and worked for high ideals".

Regarded as a pioneer of social reform, Rajagopalachari issued temple entry proclamations in the Madras Presidency and worked towards the upliftment of Dalits. He played a pivotal role in the conclusion of the Poona Pact between B. R. Ambedkar and the Indian National Congress and spearheaded the Mahabal Temple Entry program in 1938. He was a staunch advocate of prohibition and was elected Secretary of the Prohibition League of India in 1930. On assuming the premiership of the Madras Presidency, he introduced prohibition throughout the province. where it remained in vogue until its removal by M. Karunanidhi over thirty years later in 1971 and again prohibited by Karunanidhi in 1974 until it was reintroduced by M.G. Ramachandran in 1981. Rajagopalachari was also an active member of the All India Spinners Association. and a strong opponent of "linguistic states", which he felt would bring anarchy to India.

He is also remembered for his literary contributions, some of which are considered modern-day classics. He frequently wrote articles for Kalki and his own journal Swarajya, of which Philip Spratt was editor.

Richard Casey, Governor of Bengal from 1944 to 1946, regarded Rajagopalachari as the wisest man in India. The best possible tribute to Rajagopalachari was from Mahatma Gandhi who referred to him as the "keeper of my conscience". Today, his private papers are part of the archives at the Nehru Memorial Museum & Library, at Teen Murti House, Delhi.

On 21 August 1978, a portrait of Rajagopalachari was put in the Central Hall of Parliament House. The portrait of Rajagopalachari, painted by N. S. Subbakrishna, was unveiled by the then President of India, Neelam Sanjiva Reddy. On 23 February 2026, a bust of Rajagopalachari was installed at the Grand Open Staircase near Ashok Mandap of Rashtrapati Bhavan, and unveiled by President, Droupadi Murmu. This was accompanied by the first-ever 'Rajaji Utsav' celebration at the Rashtrapati Bhavan Cultural Centre.

== Reception ==
Critics opine that he failed to gauge the thoughts and feelings of the masses in provincial and then state administrations. His introduction of Hindi and the Modified Scheme of Elementary education 1953 (dubbed by its critics as Hereditary Education Policy) have been the target of extensive criticism. His pacifist stance during the Quit India Movement and his C. R. Formula angered most of his colleagues in the Indian National Congress.

Referring to Rajagopalachari, Sarojini Naidu, who was never on good terms with him, remarked that 'the Madras fox was a dry logical Adi Shankaracharya while Nehru was the noble, compassionate Buddha'.

Although his popularity at the regional level fluctuated greatly, Rajagopalachari was able to exercise his stranglehold over provincial politics mainly because he was favored by national leaders such as Gandhi, Patel and Nehru. The President of the Tamil Nadu Congress Committee, K. Kamaraj, and a majority of the provincial leaders opposed him in the 1940s, Rajagopalachari clung on to a position of influence in regional politics through support from his colleagues at the center.

Rajagopalachari has always been the archetype of the Tamil Brahmin nemesis of the Dravidian movement. He was accused of being pro-Sanskrit and pro-Hindi, despite his fierce support for the Anti-Hindi agitations of 1965. Rajagopalachari claimed that jati was "the most important element in the organization of our society". Christophe Jaffrelot argued that Rajagopalachari and other political leaders including Mahatma Gandhi and Sardar Vallabhbhai Patel praised the caste system both indirectly and directly as a glue that binds the social structure together. As a governor-general, Rajaji stated,

The food is grown, the cloth is woven, the sheep are shorn, the shoes are stitched, the scavenging is done, the cartwheels and the ploughs are built and repaired because, thank God, the respective castes are still there and the homes are trade schools as well and the parents are masters as well, to whom the children are automatically apprenticed.

== See also ==
- List of Sahitya Akademi Award winners for Tamil
- List of Indian writers
- List of Tamil-language writers

== Notes ==
Political offices
Preceded by Kurma Venkata Reddy Naidu	Premier of Madras; 1937–1939	Succeeded by Tanguturi Prakasam
Preceded by Frederick Burrows	Governor of West Bengal; 1947–1948	Succeeded by Kailash Nath Katju
Preceded by Vallabhbhai Patel	Minister of Home Affairs; 1950–1951	Succeeded by Kailash Nath Katju
Preceded by Poosapati Sanjeevi Kumarswamy Raja	Chief Minister of Madras; 1952–1954	Succeeded by Kumarasami Kamaraj
Government offices
Preceded by The Earl Mountbatten of Burma	Governor-General of India; 1948–1950	Office abolished
