= Madras State =

Former state of India (1947–1969)

- State of India
- 1950–1969
- Madras State (1947–1953)
- Map of Southern India (1953–1956) before the States Reorganisation Act of 1956 with Madras State in yellow
- Capital: Madras (now Chennai)
- Area
  - Coordinates: 13.09°N 80.27°E
- History
  - Madras Province integrated into Union of India: 15 August 1947 1950
  - Establishment of Madras state: 26 January 1950
  - Separation of Andhra: 1 October 1953
  - Separation of Kerala and re-organization: 1 November 1956
  - Renamed as Tamil Nadu: 14 January 1969 1969
Preceded by
Madras Province
Succeeded by
Tamil Nadu
Andhra State
Kerala
Karnataka
Lakshadweep
- States of India since 1947

Madras State was a state in the Indian Republic, which was in existence during the mid-20th century as a successor to the Madras Presidency of British Raj. The state came into existence on 26 January 1950 when the Constitution of India was adopted and included the present-day Tamil Nadu, parts of neighbouring states of Kerala, Andhra Pradesh and Karnataka.

Andhra state was separated in 1953. The state was further re-organized with the Malabar District being merged with the newly formed state of Kerala as well as five Tamil-majority taluks being incorporated into Madras State from the erstwhile Travancore–Cochin when states were redrawn linguistically in 1956. On 14 January 1969, the state was renamed Tamil Nadu.

== Pre-history ==
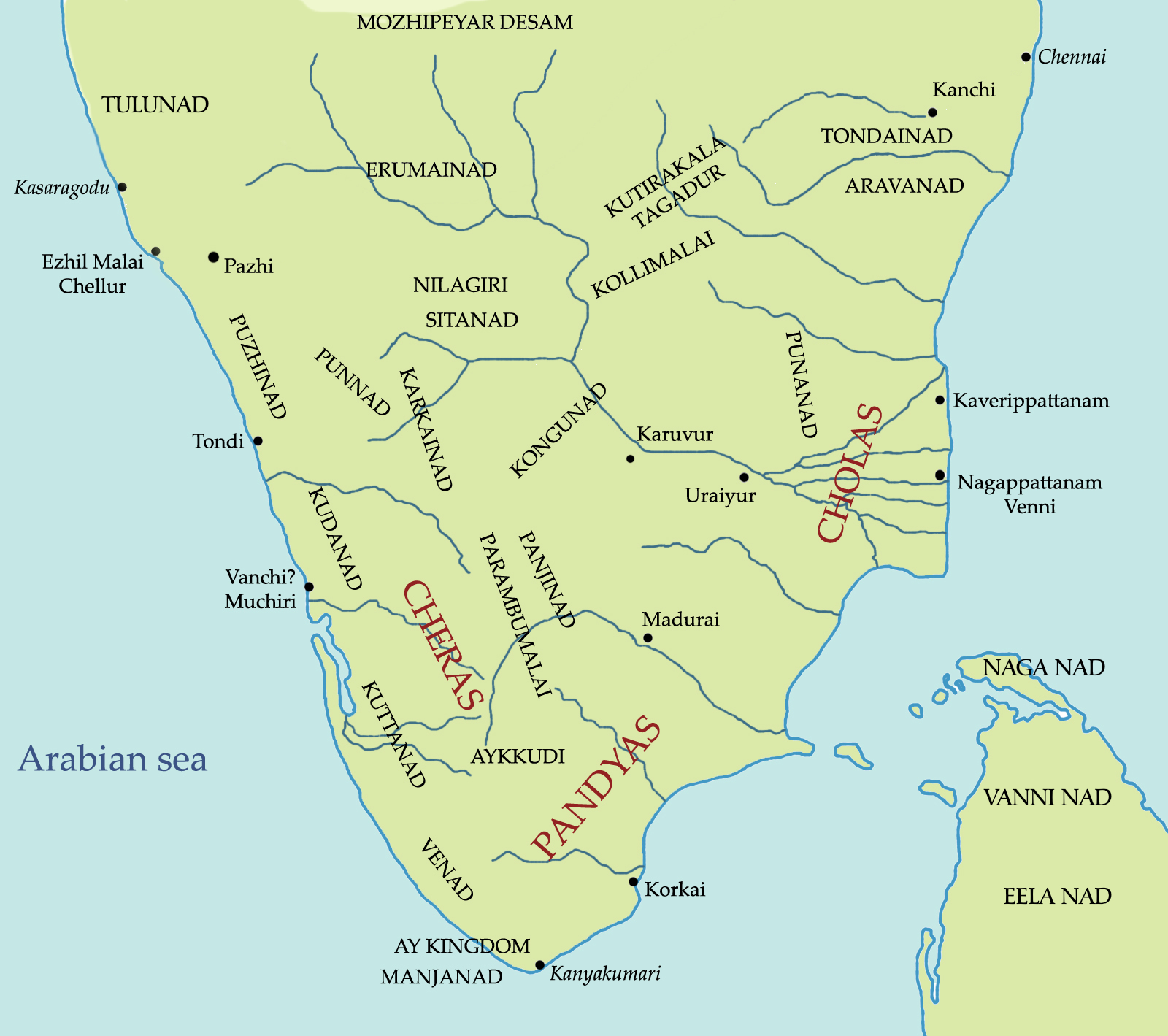
Tamilakam during the Sangam Period (500BCE-300CE)

Archaeological evidence points to the region being inhabited by hominids more than 400 millennia ago. Ancient Tamilakam, a region roughly on par with the Madras state, was ruled by a triumvirate of monarchical states, Cheras, Cholas and Pandyas. The kingdoms had significant diplomatic and trade contacts with other kingdoms to the north and Romans. The region was later ruled by Kalabhras, Pallavas, Hoysalas and Vijayanagara.

Europeans started to establish trade centers from the 16th century along the eastern coast. By the middle of the 18th century, the French and the British were involved in a protracted struggle for military control over South India. After the Fourth Anglo-Mysore War in 1799 and the end of the Second Polygar war in 1801, the British Indians consolidated their power over much of the region and established the Madras State with Madras (Chennai) as the capital. The British Raj took control of the region from the East India Company in 1857. Failure of the summer monsoons and administrative shortcomings of the Ryotwari system resulted in two severe famines in the Madras State, the Great Indian Famine of 1876–1878 and the Indian famine of 1896–97 which killed millions and the migration to other British countries. The Indian Independence Movement gathered momentum in the early 20th century.

== Post-independence ==
After the Indian independence in 1947, the erstwhile Madras Presidency was integrated into the Union of India as Madras Province. The province became Madras state following the adoption of the Constitution of India on 26 January 1950. The state was split in 1953 and further re-organized in 1956. On 14 January 1969, Madras State was renamed Tamil Nadu.

== Geography ==
Madras State covered an area of 127,790 mi^{2} (331,000 km^{2}) and consisted of the present-day Tamil Nadu, Malabar district of Kerala, Rayalaseema and Coastal Andhra of Andhra Pradesh and South Canara of Karnataka. It was located on the south of the Indian peninsula, straddled by the Western Ghats in the west, separated from the Arabian Sea by the Malabar coast, the Eastern Ghats in the northeast, the Eastern Coastal Plains lining the Bay of Bengal in the east, the Gulf of Mannar and the Palk Strait to the southeast, and the Indian Ocean at the southern cape of the peninsula. It enclosed Puducherry and shares an international maritime border with the Northern Province of Sri Lanka at Pamban Island. The Palk Strait and the chain of low sandbars and islands known as Rama's Bridge separate the region from Sri Lanka, which lies off the southeastern coast. The southernmost tip of mainland India is at Kanyakumari where the Indian Ocean meets the Bay of Bengal and the Arabian Sea. Andhra state was split from the state in 1953 and the state was further re-organized in 1956 when Kerala was formed by the merger of Travancore-Cochin state (except Sengottai taluk) with the Malabar district and Kasaragod taluk of South Canara district. The southern part of Travancore-Cochin, Kanyakumari district, along with Taluk, was transferred to Madras State. The Laccadive and Minicoy Islands were separated from Malabar District to form a new Union Territory namely Laccadive, Amindivi, and Minicoy Islands. The area shrank to 60,362 mi^{2} (156,340 km^{2}) and 50,216 mi^{2} (130,060 km^{2}) in 1956.

== Demographics ==
As per the 1951 census, the state had a population of 57,016,002 which later became 35,734,489 in 1953 after the split of Andhra and 30,119,047 in 1956. Hinduism was the major religion with 86.8% followed by Islam at 9% and Christianity at 4%. After 1953, Tamil was the major language followed by Malayalam (spoken in Malabar district before re-organization in 1956) and Telugu.

== Administration and politics ==
=== Early years (1947–1954) ===
O. P. Ramaswamy Reddiyar was the Premier of Madras Presidency during the Independence and served till 6 April 1949. P. S. Kumaraswamy Raja was the chief minister till April 1952 till the first elections were held in 1952. As laid down by the constitution, the state had 375 seats in the assembly. In 1952 elections, the Indian National Congress emerged as the single largest party in the assembly and formed the government with Chakravarti Rajagopalachari as the chief minister. In 1953, Potti Sriramulu went on a fast until death calling for a separate state for Telugu speaking people, which led to riots post his death. Andhra state was carved out of the Madras state in 1953.

Rajaji removed controls on food grains and introduced a new education policy based on family vocation in 1953. According to this policy, students had to go to school in the morning and to compulsorily learn the family vocation practiced by their parents after school. It was opposed as casteist and opposed by Periyar. It was put on hold on 29 July 1953 and dropped altogether on 18 May 1954.

=== Kamaraj Era ===
On 13 April 1954, K. Kamaraj became the chief minister of Madras state. The state boundaries were re-organized further in 1956. Kamaraj opened a primary school for every square mile and eventually made school education free. He expanded the Midday Meal Scheme to cover all public schools. He introduced free school uniforms to weed out caste, creed and class distinctions among school children. The literacy rate went up from 19% to 37% during his tenure. Major irrigation schemes were planned in Kamaraj's period and more than ten dams and irrigation canals were built across the state. He established more than 13 industrial estates and brought many industries and research facilities to the state including Neyveli Lignite Corporation, BHEL at Trichy, Integral Coach Factory and IIT Madras. Kamaraj remained chief minister for three consecutive terms, winning elections in 1957 and 1962. In 1949, C. N. Annadurai, a follower of Periyar, formed the Dravida Munnetra Kazhagam (DMK). On 2 October 1963, he resigned as the chief minister and proposed that all senior Congress leaders should resign from their posts to devote all their energy to the re-vitalization of the congress party which would later be known as the Kamaraj Plan.

=== Later years (1962–1969) ===
M. Bhaktavatsalam became the chief minister post the resignation of Kamaraj. During his tenure, the state witnessed Anti-Hindi agitations in response to the Union Government's Official Languages Act passed in 1963 which planned to introduce Hindi as compulsory language and to rejected the demands to make Tamil the medium of instruction in colleges. On 7 March 1964, Bhaktavatsalam recommended the introduction of a three-language formula comprising English, Hindi and Tamil. The amendment to the original act was passed in November 1967, accepting the three language formula where-in English will continue to be an additional language used for official communications. The Anti-Hindi agitations of Tamil Nadu led to the rise of Dravidian parties that formed Tamil Nadu's first government in 1967.

In 1967, the DMK won the elections and formed the first non-Congress government under Annadurai. The 1967 elections also resulted in an electoral fusion among the non-Congress parties to avoid a split in the Opposition votes with former chief minister Rajagopalachari leaving the Congress to found the right-wing Swatantra Party. In 1967, the state government legalized self-respect marriages and announced the distribution of rice at subsidized prices through the public distribution system. In 1969, the state government proposed renaming the state to Tamil Nadu and on 14 January 1969, the state was renamed Tamil Nadu.

== See also ==
- List of chief ministers of Tamil Nadu
