= K. A. Manoharan =

Indian politician (born 1951)

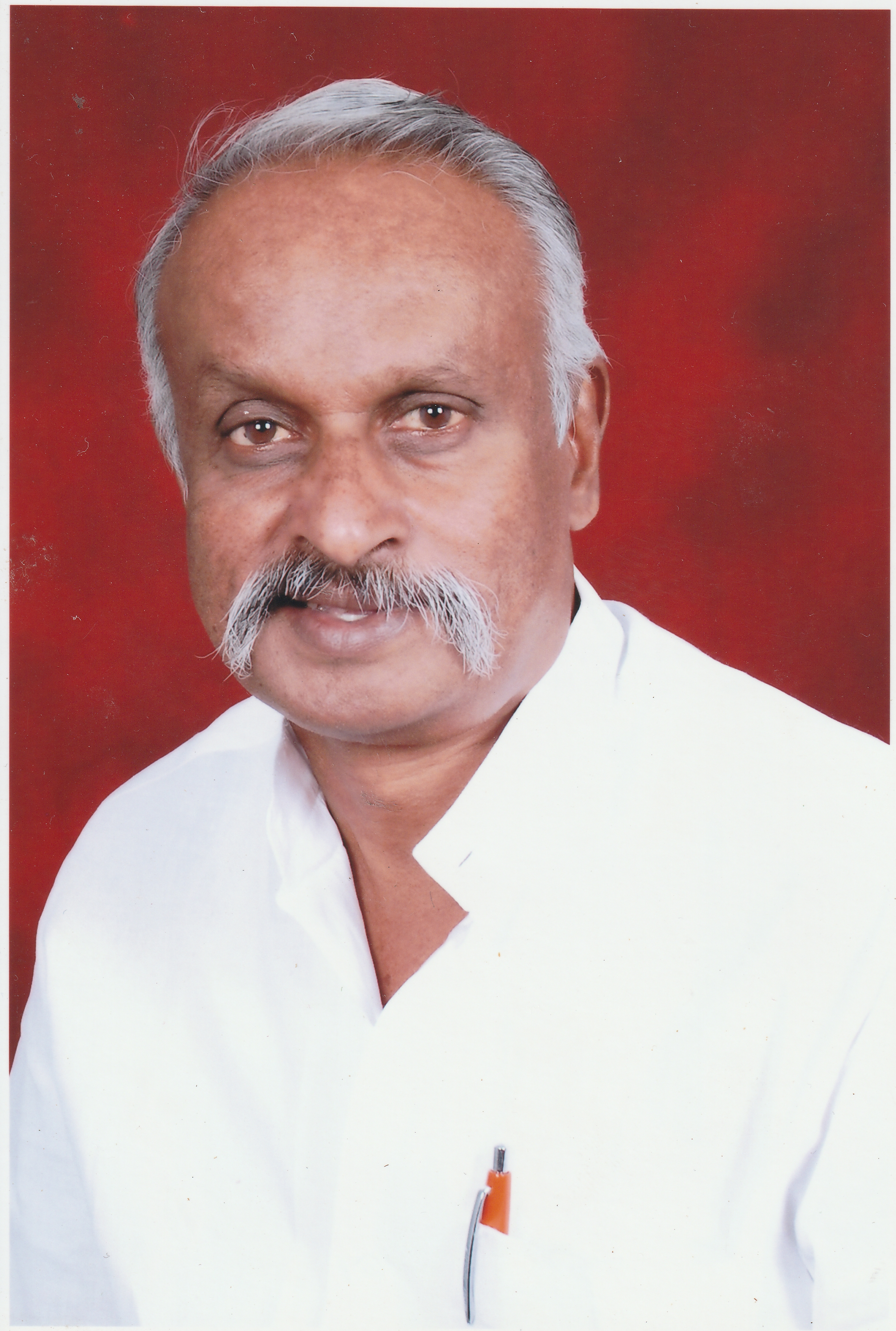

Member Of Legislative Assembly (Hosur)
- In office 1991–1996
- Preceded by: N. Ramachandra Reddy
- Succeeded by: B. Venkatasamy

Working President of Tamilnadu INTUC (Indian National Trade Union Congress)
- Incumbent
- Assumed office 2020

National Secretary INTUC (Indian National Trade Union Congress)

President of Krishnagiri District Historical Research Center

Personal details
- Born: 21 February 1951 (age 75) Hosur, Tamil Nadu, India
- Party: Indian National Congress
- Spouse: Banumathi Manoharan
- Relations: K. A. Jothiprakash (Brother); K. Rajaram (Co-Brother); D. Jothi Jegarajan (cousin)
- Children: 2
- Parent(s): K. Appavu Pillai (Father); Ponnammal Appavu Pillai (Mother)
- Education: PSG College of Arts and Science
- Awards: Honorary Doctorate (2019)
- Website: www.kamanoharan.in
- Nickname: K.A.M

Dr. Kulandaivelu Appavu Manoharan (born 21 February 1951) is an Indian politician and was elected in as a Member of Tamil Nadu Legislative Assembly from Hosur constituency. He has also served as the President of the Hosur municipality in 1978. He is the eldest son of late K. Appavu Pillai. He is currently the Working President of Tamilnadu INTUC and National Secretary of Indian National Trade Union Congress (INTUC).

== Early life and family ==
K.A. Manoharan is the eldest son of veteran politician Mr. K. Appavu Pillai and Mrs. Ponnammal, was born in Hosur on 21 February 1951. Manoharan is married to Banumathi and has two children. He Studied in PSG College of Arts and Science, Coimbatore and completed his bachelor degree. K.A Manoharan has been conferred Honorary Doctorates by the National Virtue University of Peace and Education in March 2019.

== Politics ==
Manoharan was elected as the President of Hosur Town Panchayat at the age of 22. He has been a member of the Indian National Congress since 1990.

In 1991, he was elected to the Tamil Nadu Legislative Assembly from Hosur constituency.

He is a member of the Indian National Trade Union Congress (INTUC) and a National General Secretary of the Indian National Trade Union Congress (INTUC) from 2019.

== Elections contested ==
Year	Election	Party	Constituency	Result	Vote Percentage	Opposition Candidate	opposition party	Opposition Vote Percentage
1984	Tamil Nadu Legislative Assembly Election	IND	Hosur	Lost	17.66 %	T. Venkata Reddy	INC	48.3%
1989	Tamil Nadu Legislative Assembly Election	Not Contested						
1991	Tamil Nadu Legislative Assembly Election	INC	Hosur	Won	47.64 %	B. Venkatasamy	Janata Dal	38.84 %

== Positions held ==
- Former Member Of Legislative Assembly For Hosur (1991 - 1996).
- Working President Of Tamilnadu INTUC (Indian National Trade Union Congress).
- National Secretary Of Indian National Trade Union Congress.
- Vice President of Tamilnadu National Electricity Workers Federation.
- President Of Krishnagiri Historical Research Center.
- President of Hosur Tamil Valartchi Mandram.
- Vice President Of Madras Film Society.
