= Hosur Aerodrome =

Domestic Airport in Hosur, India

Hosur Aerodrome (TAAL Airfield)
- IATA: NIL; ICAO: VO95

Summary
- Airport type: Private licensed aerodrome/airfield
- Owner: Taneja
- Operator: Taneja Aerospace and Aviation
- Serves: Hosur
- Location: Near Hosur
- Elevation AMSL: 3,050 ft (930 m)
- Coordinates: 12°39′40″N 077°46′01″E
- Website: http://www.taalaerodrome.com

Map
- Location within Tamil Nadu

Runways
Direction	Length		Surface
Direction	ft	m	Surface
09/27	7,012	2,168	Paved (lighted)

Hosur Aerodrome is a private aerodrome located in the Belagondapalli suburb, 10 Kilometres southwest of Hosur, Tamil Nadu, India.

The airfield is owned by Taneja Aerospace and Aviation Limited (TAAL), established in 1994 as the first private sector company to manufacture general aviation aircraft in India. TAAL uses the airfield for its aircraft manufacturing, sales, and MRO businesses. This aerodrome is approved and licensed by the Directorate General of Civil Aviation (DGCA) under the private use category. The aerodrome complex also houses MRO facilities of Air Works India and widebody aircraft painting facilities of Air Livery.

== UDAN operations ==
In 2016, the airstrip was identified as one of 13 unserved airstrips in Tamil Nadu as eligible under the Government's Regional Air Connectivity Scheme (RCS), also known as UDAN.

Turbo Aviation had bid for and was awarded the Chennai-Hosur-Chennai route under phase one of the UDAN scheme. However, Hosur airfield lies around 90 kilometres from the Kempegowda International Airport. The Concessionaire Agreement signed between Government of India and BIAL, the operators of Kempegowda International Airport, restricts opening of any new or existing domestic airport within an aerial distance of 150 kms from Bengaluru airport for a period of 25 years. BIAL had informed the Central government that it may consider a one-time concession for the purpose of RCS at Hosur, subject to all involved parties entering into an agreement with specific conditions. Considering the bid received under UDAN Scheme and based on the request of the Government of Tamil Nadu, the DGCA and Airports Authority of India (AAI) conducted a joint feasibility study toward developing RCS flights at Hosur airfield. The study concluded that TAAL, being the owners of the airfield, would require to invest approximately Rs. 30 crores to develop a passenger terminal building and apron for the operation of RCS flights. TAAL expressed their inability to bear this cost. Since the development of private airports is not covered under RCS, the Centre requested the State Government of Tamil Nadu to take up these issue. In February 2023, the Centre said the Hosur airfield has been taken off the UDAN scheme citing the agreement that it signed with BIAL.

== Structure ==
Hosur Aerodrome has one asphalt runway, oriented 09/27, 7012 feet long and 150 feet wide, capable of accepting Airbus A320 and Boeing 737 aircraft, and has night landing facilities which are awaiting approval. At the moment, the airfield is purely VFR lying in the local flying area of the HAL Airport, the former civilian airport in Bengaluru; approach control to aircraft is provided by ATC in Bengaluru and terminal advisory control is provided by Hosur ATC.

Navigational aids at Hosur include PAPI lights and an aerodrome beacon. It has aprons measuring 110 × 90 and 110 × 80 meters for jet aircraft and another one measuring 40 × 19 meters for turboprop and light aircraft.

== Greenfield airport ==
In December 2021, the State-owned Tamil Nadu Industrial Development Corporation (TIDCO), invited proposals from consultants to undertake demand assessment, air traffic forecasting and identification of potential sites for setting up a greenfield airport for Hosur. TIDCO identified five sites, which were narrowed down to two, based on the recommendations of the feasibility study carried out by the AAI. One was about 1.5 km from the Taneja airstrip and the other around 15.5 km near Ulagam (east of Hosur and north of Shoolagiri).

Chief Minister M K Stalin in June 2024 announced in the state assembly that the government was planning to set up a new airport spanning over 2,000 acres of land in Hosur with a capacity to handle 30 million passengers annually. In Feb 2025, the Government of India (GoI) promised to intervene in the existing concession agreement with the Bengaluru International Airport Limited (BIAL), which barred building a new airport within 150 kilometres of aerial distance from Kempegowda International Airport until 2033. The MoCA said that BIAL, GoI and TN have to sit together to arrive at a consensus.

In August 2025, the Tamil Nadu government decided on a site, 15.5 kilometres from the Taneja airstrip, in Shoolagiri Taluk located between Berigai and Bagalur. An estimated 2,300 acres of land will be required for the project. The government already owns about 650 acres in the area .
