= M. Venkatarama Reddy =

Member of the Tamil Nadu Legislative Assembly
- In office 1991–1996
- Preceded by: D. C. Vijayendraiah
- Succeeded by: S. Raja Reddy
- Constituency: Thali

Personal details
- Born: 26 April 1939 Varathareddypalayam
- Party: Indian National Congress
- Profession: Lawyer

M. Venkatarama Reddy is an Indian politician and a former member of the Tamil Nadu Legislative Assembly. He hails from Hosur in the Krishnagiri district. Having completed his postgraduate and Bachelor of Laws (LLB) degrees, Venkatarama Reddy is a member of the Indian National Congress party. He was elected to the Tamil Nadu Legislative Assembly from the Thali Assembly constituency in the 1991 elections.

== Electoral Performance ==
=== 1991 ===
1991 Tamil Nadu Legislative Assembly election: Thalli
Party	Candidate	Votes	%	±%
INC	M. Venkatarama Reddy	38,831	45.88	+24.15
BJP	V. Ranga Reddi	28,270	33.41	New
JD	B. Ramachandra Reddy	14,917	17.63	New
PMK	Abdul Nasar Alias Nasar	1,412	1.67	New
THMM	K. Jaisankar	466	0.55	New
Margin of victory		10,561	12.48	−11.74
Turnout		84,627	59.87	−6.90
Registered electors		147,078		
INC gain from JP		Swing	-0.07	
