= K. Gopinath =

Indian politician

Member of Parliament, Lok Sabha
- Incumbent
- Assumed office 4 June 2024
- Preceded by: A. Chellakumar
- Constituency: Krishnagiri

Member of Legislative Assembly Tamil Nadu
- In office 13 May 2001 – 19 May 2016
- Preceded by: B. Venkataswamy
- Succeeded by: P. Balakrishna Reddy
- Constituency: Hosur constituency

Personal details
- Born: November 19, 1962 (age 63) Hosur, Madras State, India (Now in Tamil Nadu)
- Party: Indian National Congress

K. Gopinath (born 19 November 1962) is an Indian politician and was elected in 2011 as a member of the Tamil Nadu Legislative Assembly from Hosur constituency. As a candidate of Indian National Congress, he was previously elected to the Assembly from the Hosur constituency in the 2001 and 2006 elections.

He lost the Hosur seat to P. Balakrishna Reddy of the All India Anna Dravida Munnetra Kazhagam in the 2016 elections.

== Childhood ==
Gopinath was born in Hosur, Krishnagiri district, on 19 November 1962. He is married.
