= T. Ramachandran (CPI politician) =

Indian politician

Member of Tamil Nadu Legislative Assembly
- Incumbent
- Assumed office 2 May 2021
- Preceded by: Y. Prakaash
- Constituency: Thalli
- In office 11 May 2006 – 19 May 2016
- Preceded by: K. V. Muralidharan
- Succeeded by: Y. Prakaash
- Constituency: Thalli

Personal details
- Born: 1968 (age 57–58) Thalli, Krishnagiri district, Tamil Nadu, India
- Party: Communist Party of India (since 2007)
- Other political affiliations: Independent (2006 - 2007); Communist Party of India (Marxist) (till 2006)
- Occupation: Politician; Social Worker

T. Ramachandran is an Indian politician from Tamil Nadu. He is a four time Member of the Tamil Nadu Legislative Assembly from the Thalli Assembly constituency, first as an independent in 2006 and later representing the Communist Party of India (Marxist) in 2011, 2021 and 2026.

== Political career ==
Ramachandran began getting involved in politics. He joined the Communist Party of India (Marxist). He criticised the state leadership of CPI(M) in public, resigned and contested as independent candidate in 2006 Tamil Nadu Legislative Assembly election. Later, he joined the Communist Party of India in 2007. He represented the Communist Party of India in the Fourteenth Assembly (2011-2016). In the prior Assembly of 2006-2011 he represented the same constituency as an independent member.

== Elections contested ==
| Election | Constituency | Party | Result | Vote % | Runner-up | Runner-up Party | Runner-up vote % |
|---|---|---|---|---|---|---|---|
| 2026 Tamil Nadu Legislative Assembly election | Thalli | CPI | Won | 38.02% | Dr.C.Nageshkumar | BJP | 35.48% |
| 2021 Tamil Nadu Legislative Assembly election | Thalli | CPI | Won | 62.18% | Dr.C.Nageshkumar | BJP | 33.2% |
| 2011 Tamil Nadu Legislative Assembly election | Thalli | CPI | Won | 47.09% | Prakaash. Y | DMK | 43.75% |
| 2006 Tamil Nadu Legislative Assembly election | Thalli | Independent | Won | 43.60% | NAGARAJA REDDY P | CPI | 42.40% |

== Legal allegations ==
On 5 October 2012 Ramachandran faced allegations of instigating violence in connection with a temple festival in Nilgiris village near Uthanapalli near Hosur. Ramachandran was also arrested in the illegal quarry mining case registered in Kelamangalam Police station under Crime No. 201/2012 under sections 379 of IPC and 21 (IV) of Mines and Minerals Act and Section 4 of PPDL. Ramachandran was arrested in connection with all the ten cases registered against him after the murder of PDK functionary T. Palani in Balepuram village on 5 July 2012.

In 2015 Ramachandran was charged under the Goondas Act for his alleged involvement in several murders and other anti-social activities.
