= K. Appavu Pillai =

Indian politician (1911-1973)

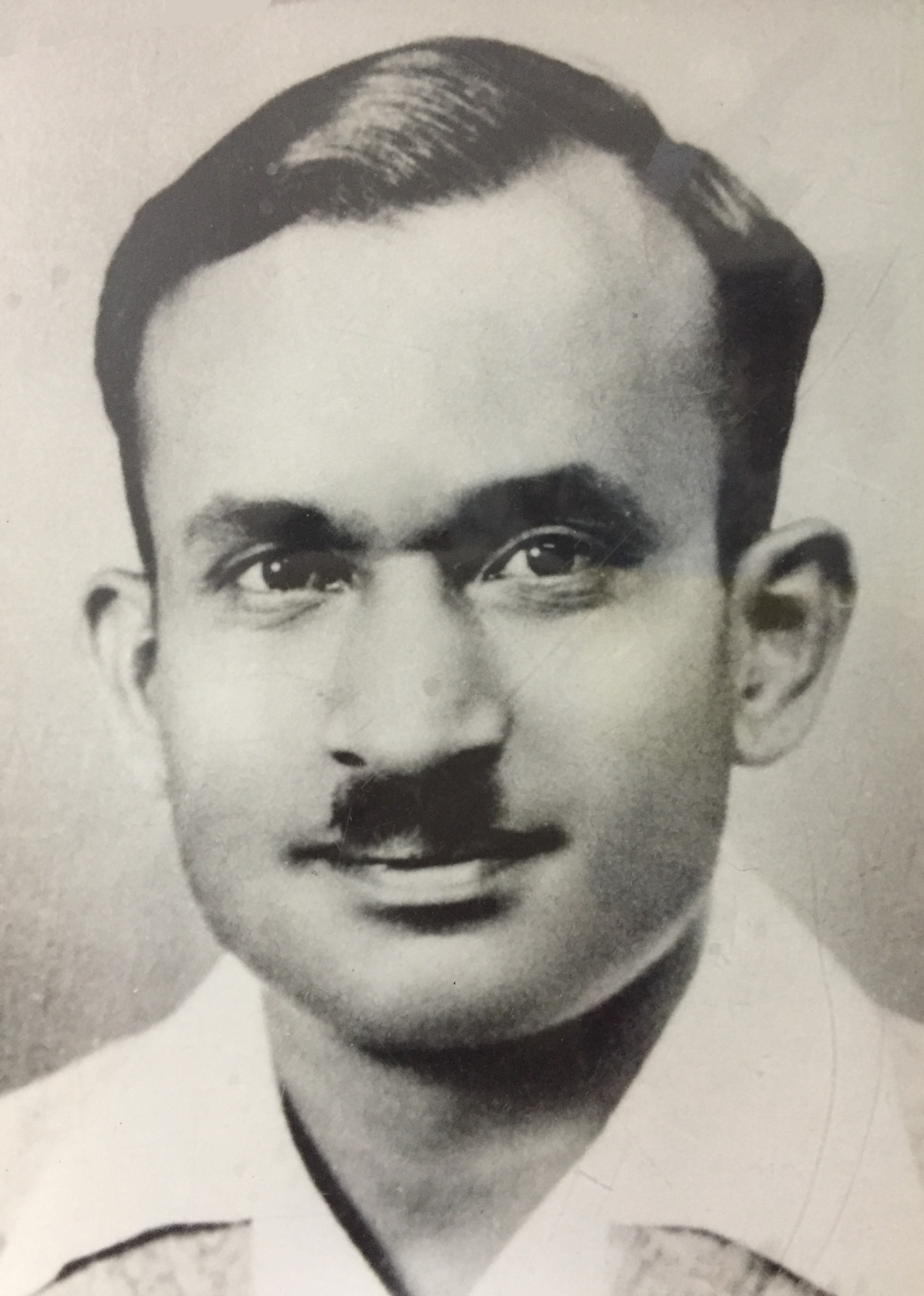

Member Of Legislative Assembly (Hosur)
- In office 1957–1962
- Preceded by: R. Muni Reddy
- Succeeded by: N. Ramachandra Reddy

President of Hosur Panchayat
- In office 1943 – 1973 (30 Years)

President of Co Operative Housing Society
- In office 1948–1973

Managing Director of Salem Central Co-operative bank

Director of Dharmapuri Central Co-operative bank

Personal details
- Born: 15 April 1911 Hosur, Madras Presidency, British India
- Died: 1 October 1973 (aged 62) Hosur, India
- Party: Indian National Congress
- Spouse: Ponnammal Appavu Pillai
- Relations: R.Dayalan (Grandson, Dravida Munnetra Kazhagam); R.Loganathan(Grandson), R.Murugan(Grandson); R.Thangavel(Grandson).
- Children: • JothiPrakash • K. A. Manoharan
- Parent(s): Kulandaivelu Pillai (Father); Dheivanaiyammal (Mother)
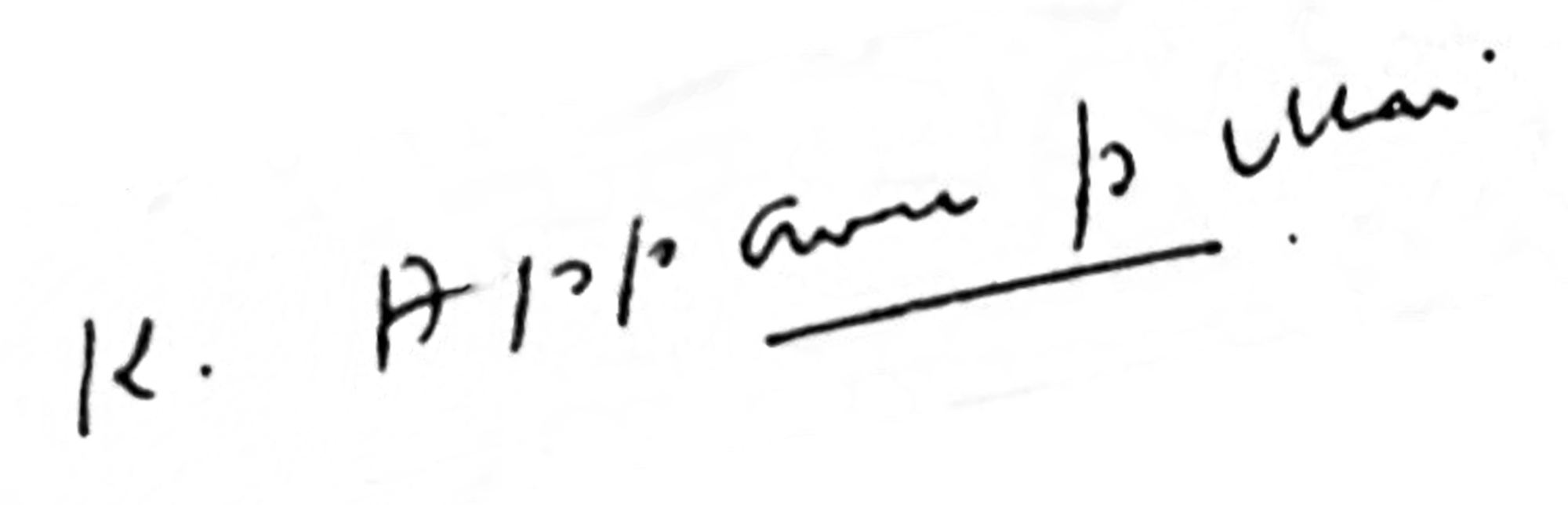
- Signature
- Website: www.kappavupillai.in

Kulandaivelu Appavu Pillai (born 15 April 1911) is an Indian politician and former Member of the Legislative Assembly of Hosur. K. Appavu Pillai, popularly known as K.A.P, was an idealist and farsighted visionary in erstwhile Salem District and in Hosur town particularly. K. Appavu Pillai was elected as a Panchayat President, Hosur during the British regime (1943) for 30 long years till he breath his last on 1 October 1973. He won the 1957 State Assembly Election for Hosur Constituency and was instrumental in establishing SIPCOT in Hosur.

Born at Hosur in a middle-class family got educated in the District Board High School, Hosur. He rose to the position of a legislator, Managing Director Salem Central Co-op bank and Director - Dharmapuri central Co-op Bank.

== Early life ==
K. Appavu pillai is the father of K. A. Manoharan.

== Elections contested ==
Year	Election	Party	Constituency	Result	opposition candidate	opposition party
1952	Tamil Nadu Assembly General Election	INC	Hosur	Lost	R. Muni Reddy	IND
1957	Tamil Nadu Assembly General Election	IND	Hosur	Won	N. Ramachandra Reddy	INC
1967	Tamil Nadu Assembly General Election	INC	Hosur	Lost	B. Venkataswamy	Swatantra Party

== Hosur Bus Stand named after K. Appavu Pillai ==
In 1980s the hosur bus stand was named after K. Appavu Pillai, on the remembrance of his service towards Hosur town panchayat for more than 30 years. In 2007 the new integrated bus terminus was again named after him and inaugurated by M. K. Stalin on 18 July 2010.

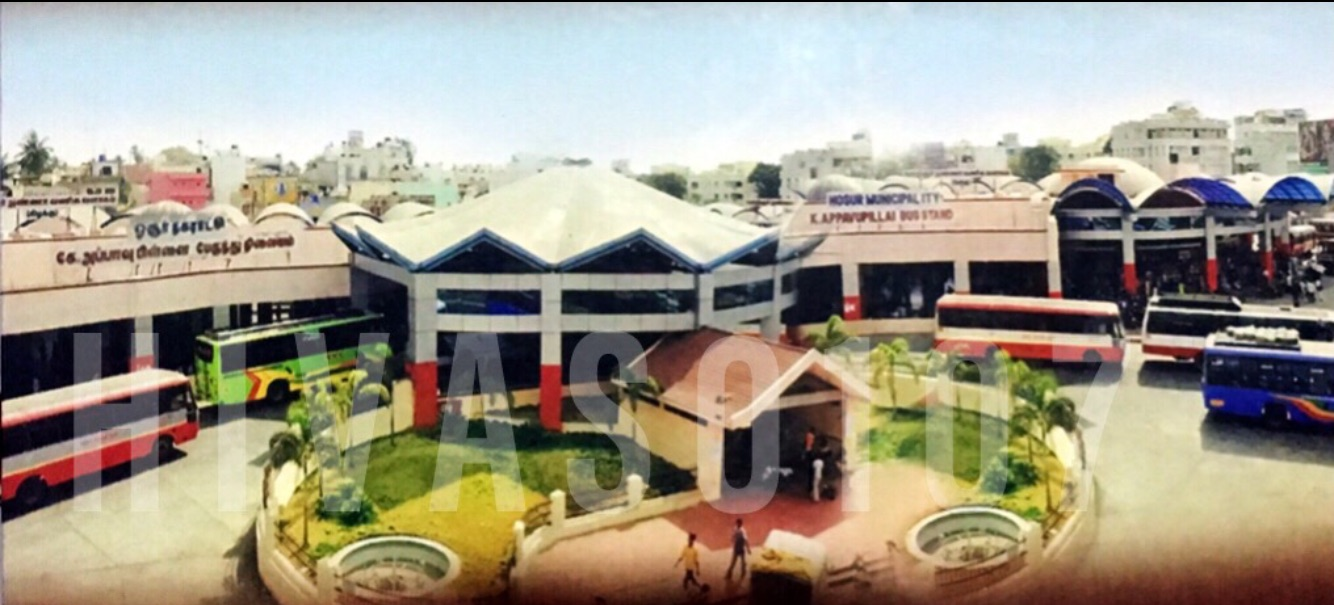
Hosur Bus Stand named after K.Appavu Pillai

== Hosur Appavu Nagar ==
Appavu Nagar is a Locality in Hosur town named after K. Appavu Pillai.

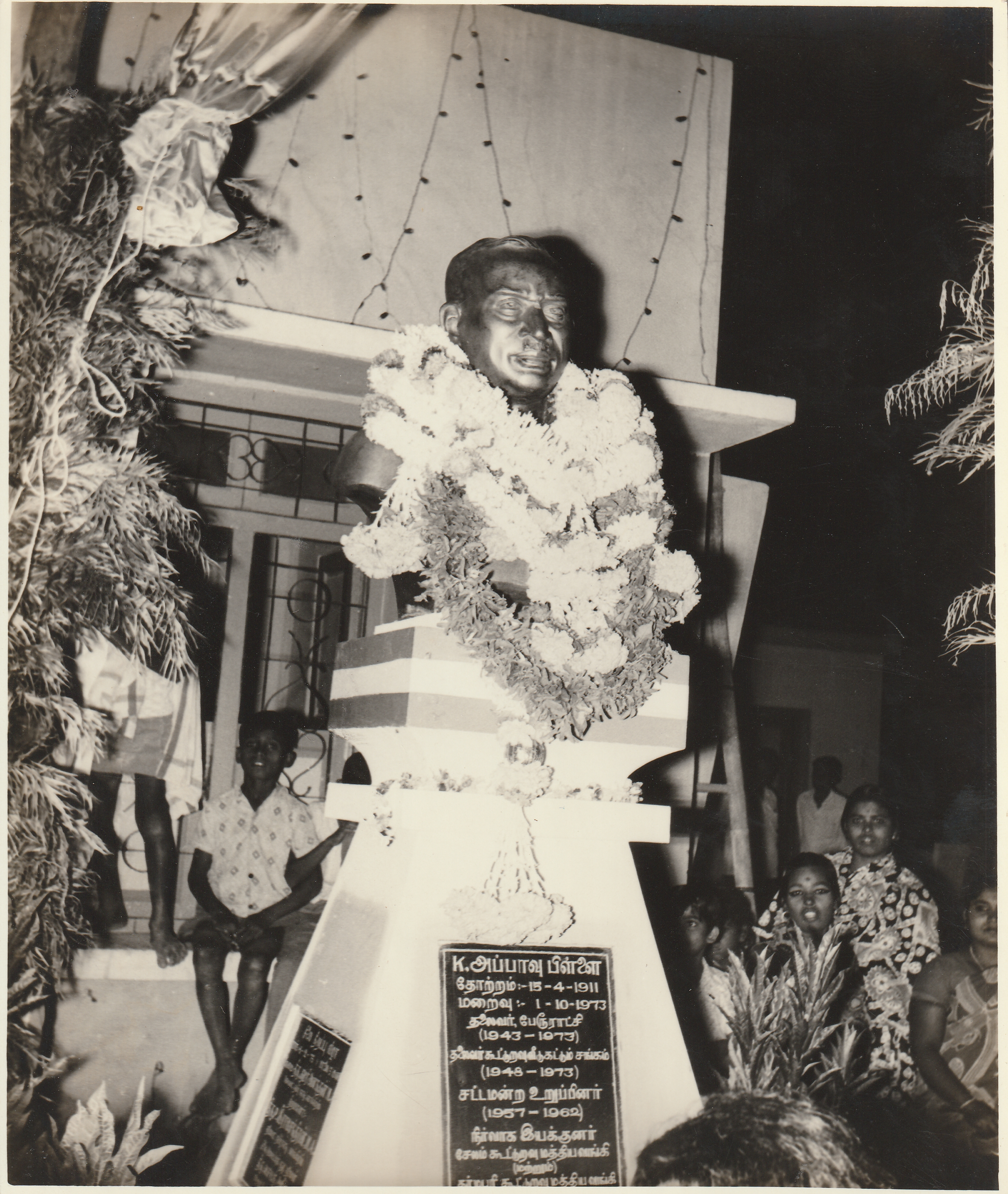
K.A.P Statue at Hosur Municipality Office inaugurated by Former Tamil Nadu Congress Leader Thiru. Ramachandran.
