= Y. Prakaash =

Indian politician

Member of the Tamil Nadu Legislative Assembly
- In office 12 May 2021 – 6 May 2026
- Preceded by: S. A. Sathya
- Succeeded by: P. Balakrishna Reddy
- Constituency: Hosur
- In office 19 May 2016 – 2 May 2021
- Preceded by: T. Ramachandran
- Succeeded by: T. Ramachandran
- Constituency: Thalli

Personal details
- Party: Dravida Munnetra Kazhagam

Yellappa Prakash is an Indian politician who is a Member of Legislative Assembly of Tamil Nadu. He was elected from Hosur as a Dravida Munnetra Kazhagam candidate in 2021.

== Electoral performance ==
2021 Tamil Nadu Legislative Assembly election: Hosur
Party	Candidate	Votes	%	±%
DMK	Y. Prakaash	118,231	47.65	New
AIADMK	S. Jyothi	105,864	42.67	+1.08
NTK	S. Geetha Lakshmi	11,422	4.60	+3.20
MNM	S. Masood	6,563	2.65	New
NOTA	NOTA	1,976	0.80	−0.80
Margin of victory		12,367	4.98	−5.68
Turnout		248,098	70.54	−0.63
Rejected ballots		264	0.11	
Registered electors		351,715		

== Personal life ==
Prakaash is married and had only one son, Karuna Sagar, who died in a large car accident in 2021 near Koramangala. He can speak Tamil, Telugu and Kannada.
