= P. Balakrishna Reddy =

Indian politician

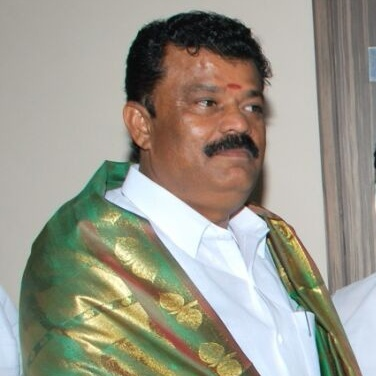

Member of the Tamil Nadu Legislative Assembly
- Incumbent
- Assumed office 11 May 2026
- Preceded by: Y. Prakaash
- Constituency: Hosur
- In office 16 May 2016 – 26 March 2019
- Preceded by: K. Gopinath
- Succeeded by: S. A. Sathya
- Constituency: Hosur

Minister for Youth Welfare and Sports Development
- In office 16 February 2017 – 26 March 2019

Minister for Animal Husbandry
- In office 16 May 2016 – 16 February 2017
- Succeeded by: Udumalai K. Radhakrishnan

Personal details
- Born: Jeemangalam, Hosur, Tamil Nadu, India
- Party: All India Anna Dravida Munnetra Kazhagam
- Spouse: Jyothi Reddy
- Children: 2 (Chirag Reddy and Laasyaa Reddy)

P. Balakrishna Reddy is a politician and former Minister of Tamil Nadu. He was elected as a MLA from Hosur in 2016. He started his political career from Bharatiya Janata Party. He had also served as the chairman of the Hosur municipality. He became Animal Husbandry Minister and later Youth Welfare and Sports Development Minister in Tamil Nadu.

On 7 January 2019, he was convicted under sections 147 (rioting) and 341 (wrongfully restraining any person) of Indian Penal code and section 3 of Tamil Nadu Property Prevention of Damage and Loss Act, 1992 and sentenced to three years imprisonment in a case of rioting in 1998 in Bagalur village in Krishnagiri by the special court.

The court later suspended the sentence imposed on Balakrishna Reddy allowing him to appeal before the Madras High Court. However, on further appealing of the sentence in supreme court, he was granted a suspension on conviction.
