= Hosur metropolitan area =

Hosur City Municipal Corporation is the civic body governing city of industrial hub Hosur in Tamil Nadu state of India. It was the 13th Municipal corporation in Tamil Nadu established on 13 February 2019. It is headed by a Mayor, who presides over a Deputy mayor, 45 councillors who represents over 45 wards of the city, and it has adjoined with Mathigiri town panchayat, Zuzuvadi, Chennathur, Avalapalli and Mookandapalli village panchayat. The annual tax revenue of the corporation is 102.41 crore rupees. Hosur is one of the major industrial city in Tamil Nadu and had a population of 345,354 with an area of 72.41 km².

== History and administration ==
Hosur town was constituted as Selection grade Town Panchayat in the year 1962 and then upgraded to Second Grade Municipality in the Year 1992 and to Selection Grade Municipality in the year 1998. In 2011, vide GO. No. 127 dated 8 September 2011 town panchayat of Mathigiri and village panchayats of Zuzuvadi, Mookandapalli, Avalapalli and Chennathur were included in Hosur Municipality and upgraded as Special Grade municipality.

Then, on 13 February 2019, Hosur Municipality was upgraded to Municipal Corporation by former Chief minister of Tamil Nadu Edappadi K. Palaniswami. and becomes one of the 21 municipal corporations in Tamil Nadu. It was the first corporation to be made without a district's headquarters.

At present Hosur corporation has adjoined with Mathigiri town panchayat, Zuzuvadi, Avalapalli, Chennathur and Mookandapalli village panchayat. In April 2022, plans to expand the city limit upto 740 square kilometres were announced.
