= Hosur Assembly constituency =

State Legislative Assembly Constituency in Tamil Nadu

Coordinates: 12.735°N 77.829°E

Hosur
- Constituency No. 55 for the Tamil Nadu Legislative Assembly

Constituency details
- Country: India
- Region: South India
- State: Tamil Nadu
- District: Krishnagiri
- Lok Sabha constituency: Krishnagiri
- Established: 1951
- Total electors: 3,43,040
- Reservation: None

Member of Legislative Assembly
- 17th Tamil Nadu Legislative Assembly
- Incumbent P. Balakrishna Reddy
- Party: AIADMK
- Alliance: NDA
- Elected year: 2026

Hosur is a state assembly constituency in Krishnagiri district in Tamil Nadu, India. Its State Assembly Constituency number is 55. It consists of a portion of Hosur taluk. It forms a part of Krishnagiri Lok Sabha constituency for national elections to the Parliament of India. It is one of the 234 State Legislative Assembly Constituencies in Tamil Nadu, in India.

== Members of Legislative Assembly ==
Year	Member	Political party
Madras State
1952	R. Muni Reddy	Independent
1957	K. Appavu Pillai	Independent
1962	N. Ramachandra Reddy	Indian National Congress
1967	B. Venkataswamy	Swatantra Party
Tamil Nadu
1971	B. Venkataswamy	Swatantra Party
1977	N. Ramachandra Reddy	Indian National Congress
1980	T. Venkata Reddy	Indian National Congress (I)
1984	T. Venkata Reddy	Indian National Congress
1989	N. Ramachandra Reddy	Indian National Congress
1991	K. A. Manoharan	Indian National Congress
1996	B. Venkatasamy	Janata Dal
2001	K. Gopinath	Indian National Congress
2006	K. Gopinath	Indian National Congress
2011	K. Gopinath	Indian National Congress
2016	P. Balakrishna Reddy	All India Anna Dravida Munnetra Kazhagam
2019^	S. A. Sathya	Dravida Munnetra Kazhagam
2021	Y. Prakaash	Dravida Munnetra Kazhagam
2026	P. Balakrishna Reddy	All India Anna Dravida Munnetra Kazhagam

== Election results ==
Vote share of winning candidates
2026	39.55%
2021	47.65%
2019 by-election	50.30%
2016	41.59%
2011	37.79%
2006	42.08%
2001	35.24%
1996	34.89%
1991	47.64%
1989	39.78%
1984	48.37%
1980	49.80%
1977	58.12%
1971	63.81%
1967	52.69%
1962	64.46%
1957	39.60%
1952	53.90%

=== 2026 ===
2026 Tamil Nadu Legislative Assembly election: Hosur
Party	Candidate	Votes	%	±%
AIADMK	P. Balakrishna Reddy	109,867	39.55	▼3.12
TVK	Vendarkarasan S.	82,064	29.54	New
DMK	Sathya S. A.	73,773	26.56	▼21.09
NTK	Stalin R.	7,632	2.75	▼1.85
NOTA	NOTA	1,614	0.58	▼0.22
Margin of victory		27,803	10.01	▲5.03
Turnout		2,77,770	80.97	▲10.43
Registered electors		3,43,040		▼8,675
AIADMK gain from DMK		Swing	▼3.12	

=== 2021 ===
2021 Tamil Nadu Legislative Assembly election: Hosur
Party	Candidate	Votes	%	±%
DMK	Y. Prakaash	118,231	47.65	New
AIADMK	S. Jyothi Reddy	105,864	42.67	+1.08
NTK	S. Geetha Lakshmi	11,422	4.60	+3.20
MNM	S. Masood	6,563	2.65	New
NOTA	NOTA	1,976	0.80	−0.80
Margin of victory		12,367	4.98	−5.68
Turnout		248,098	70.54	−0.63
Rejected ballots		264	0.11	
Registered electors		351,715		

=== 2019 by-election ===
2019 Tamil Nadu Legislative Assembly by-elections: Hosur
Party	Candidate	Votes	%	±%
DMK	S. A. Sathya	115,027	50.30	+50.30
AIADMK	S. Jyothi	91,814	40.15	−1.44
MNM	P. Jeyapal	8,032	3.51	+3.51
NTK	M. Rajasekar	6,740	2.95	+2.95
NOTA	None of the Above	4,262	1.86	+0.26
Majority		23,213	10.15	−0.52
Turnout		2,28,709	69.87	−1.34
DMK gain from AIADMK		Swing	+8.71	

=== 2016 ===
2016 Tamil Nadu Legislative Assembly election: Hosur
Party	Candidate	Votes	%	±%
AIADMK	P. Balakrishna Reddy	89,510	41.59%	New
INC	K. Gopinath	66,546	30.92%	−6.87
BJP	G. Balakrishnan	28,850	13.40%	+2.24
PMK	P. Muniraj	10,309	4.79%	New
DMDK	V. Chandran	7,780	3.61%	−25.95
NOTA	NOTA	3,445	1.60%	New
NTK	Alex Esther	3,021	1.40%	New
SDPI	N. Shanawaskhan	1,134	0.53%	New
Margin of victory		22,964	10.67%	2.45%
Turnout		215,231	71.17%	−3.83%
Registered electors		302,410		
AIADMK gain from INC		Swing	3.80%	

=== 2011 ===
2011 Tamil Nadu Legislative Assembly election: Hosur
Party	Candidate	Votes	%	±%
INC	K. Gopinath	65,034	37.79%	−4.29
DMDK	S. John Timothy	50,882	29.56%	+22.88
Independent	S. A. Sathya	24,639	14.32%	New
BJP	Bala Krishnan	19,217	11.17%	+0.25
Independent	Chitrambalam	6,325	3.68%	New
Independent	S. Ramadevan	2,018	1.17%	New
Independent	G. C. Ramaswamy	1,517	0.88%	New
BSP	H. Sanaulla Shariff	1,430	0.83%	−0.2
Independent	V. Manjunath	1,044	0.61%	New
Margin of victory		14,152	8.22%	2.40%
Turnout		172,106	75.00%	6.04%
Registered electors		229,478		
INC hold		Swing	-4.29%	

=== 2006 ===
2006 Tamil Nadu Legislative Assembly election: Hosur
Party	Candidate	Votes	%	±%
INC	K. Gopinath	90,647	42.08%	+6.85
AIADMK	V. Sampangi Ramaiah	78,096	36.26%	New
BJP	B. Venkataswamy	23,514	10.92%	−19.34
DMDK	V. Chandiran	14,401	6.69%	New
Independent	G. C. Ramasamy	3,375	1.57%	New
BSP	M. Chitrambalam	2,227	1.03%	New
TNJC	N. Krishna Reddy	1,186	0.55%	New
Independent	A. Basha	1,092	0.51%	New
Margin of victory		12,551	5.83%	0.84%
Turnout		215,406	68.95%	13.77%
Registered electors		312,387		
INC hold		Swing	6.85%	

=== 2001 ===
2001 Tamil Nadu Legislative Assembly election: Hosur
Party	Candidate	Votes	%	±%
INC	K. Gopinath	45,865	35.24%	+25.82
BJP	B. Venkataswamy	39,376	30.25%	+27.39
Independent	V. Sampangi Ramiah	30,909	23.75%	New
Independent	H. K. Srinivasan	4,270	3.28%	New
UCPI	M. S. Ramasamy Reddy	2,087	1.60%	New
Independent	R. Varalakshmi	1,914	1.47%	New
Independent	K. Narayanappa	1,607	1.23%	New
JD(S)	N. M. Sivanna	1,492	1.15%	New
Independent	K. Gowrappa	1,172	0.90%	New
Independent	Dr. V. Rajagopal	772	0.59%	New
JD(U)	M. B. Shanmugasundar	699	0.54%	New
Margin of victory		6,489	4.99%	3.52%
Turnout		130,163	55.19%	−6.19%
Registered electors		235,967		
INC gain from JD		Swing	0.35%	

=== 1996 ===
1996 Tamil Nadu Legislative Assembly election: Hosur
Party	Candidate	Votes	%	±%
JD	B. Venkataswamy	41,456	34.89%	New
TMC(M)	T. Venkata Reddy	39,719	33.43%	New
Independent	V. Sampangiramiah	20,355	17.13%	New
INC	K. Gopinath	11,190	9.42%	−38.23
BJP	M. Govindhareddy	3,399	2.86%	−7.73
JP	G. Gummareddy	851	0.72%	New
Margin of victory		1,737	1.46%	−7.34%
Turnout		118,830	61.37%	3.21%
Registered electors		212,268		
JD gain from INC		Swing	-12.76%	

=== 1991 ===
1991 Tamil Nadu Legislative Assembly election: Hosur
Party	Candidate	Votes	%	±%
INC	K. A. Manoharan	47,346	47.64%	+7.86
JD	B. Venkataswamy	38,600	38.84%	New
BJP	K. S. Narendiran	10,521	10.59%	New
PMK	B. Subramaniyam	1,958	1.97%	New
Margin of victory		8,746	8.80%	6.64%
Turnout		99,377	58.16%	−6.70%
Registered electors		177,739		
INC hold		Swing	7.86%	

=== 1989 ===
1989 Tamil Nadu Legislative Assembly election: Hosur
Party	Candidate	Votes	%	±%
INC	Ramachandra Reddy	37,934	39.78%	−8.59
JP	B. Venkataswamy	35,873	37.62%	New
AIADMK	P. M. Nanjunda Samy	12,613	13.23%	New
AIADMK	S. S. Abubacker	3,491	3.66%	New
Independent	V. K. Venkata Samy	759	0.80%	New
Independent	S. Sugumar	755	0.79%	New
Independent	K. Sundar Raj	599	0.63%	New
Independent	P. Kakiappa	578	0.61%	New
Independent	R. Venkatagiri	549	0.58%	New
Independent	H. Saroja	512	0.54%	New
Margin of victory		2,061	2.16%	−25.52%
Turnout		95,364	64.86%	−1.47%
Registered electors		152,293		
INC hold		Swing	-8.59%	

=== 1984 ===
1984 Tamil Nadu Legislative Assembly election: Hosur
Party	Candidate	Votes	%	±%
INC	T. Venkata Reddy	35,293	48.37%	−1.43
JP	E. Venkatasamy	15,096	20.69%	New
Independent	K. A. Manoharan	12,884	17.66%	New
Independent	N. Sampangiramai	5,921	8.11%	New
Independent	M. B. Shanumga Sudaram	2,199	3.01%	New
Independent	Kakiappan	923	1.26%	New
Independent	K. Krishnamoorthi	649	0.89%	New
Margin of victory		20,197	27.68%	19.18%
Turnout		72,965	66.33%	16.49%
Registered electors		120,813		
INC hold		Swing	-1.43%	

=== 1980 ===
1980 Tamil Nadu Legislative Assembly election: Hosur
Party	Candidate	Votes	%	±%
INC	T. Venkata Reddy	25,855	49.80%	−8.32
Independent	K. S. Kothanda Ramaiah	21,443	41.31%	New
INC(U)	S. Seetharama Reddy	1,889	3.64%	New
JP	K. Krishna Moorthy	1,446	2.79%	New
Independent	Kullappa	744	1.43%	New
Independent	R. Ramakrisha Reddy	536	1.03%	New
Margin of victory		4,412	8.50%	−23.87%
Turnout		51,913	49.85%	−9.11%
Registered electors		106,169		
INC hold		Swing	-8.32%	

=== 1977 ===
1977 Tamil Nadu Legislative Assembly election: Hosur
Party	Candidate	Votes	%	±%
INC	Ramachandra Reddy	30,818	58.12%	New
JP	K. S. Kothandaramiah	13,653	25.75%	New
AIADMK	M. Ramasamy	4,981	9.39%	New
DMK	A. Mohamad Salasa	3,573	6.74%	New
Margin of victory		17,165	32.37%	2.57%
Turnout		53,025	58.96%	0.24%
Registered electors		92,284		
INC gain from SWA		Swing	-5.69%	

=== 1971 ===
1971 Tamil Nadu Legislative Assembly election: Hosur
Party	Candidate	Votes	%	±%
SWA	B. Venkataswamy	28,259	63.81%	New
Independent	T. Venkata Reddy	15,063	34.01%	New
Independent	Kullappa	965	2.18%	New
Margin of victory		13,196	29.80%	24.41%
Turnout		44,287	58.72%	3.46%
Registered electors		80,662		
SWA hold		Swing	11.12%	

=== 1967 ===
1967 Madras Legislative Assembly election: Hosur
Party	Candidate	Votes	%	±%
SWA	B. Venkataswami	21,530	52.69%	New
INC	K. Appavu Pillai	19,329	47.31%	−17.15
Margin of victory		2,201	5.39%	−23.54%
Turnout		40,859	55.25%	9.79%
Registered electors		77,814		
SWA gain from INC		Swing	-11.77%	

=== 1962 ===
1962 Madras Legislative Assembly election: Hosur
Party	Candidate	Votes	%	±%
INC	Ramachandra Reddy	25,577	64.46%	+28.89
SWA	K. Shamanna	14,101	35.54%	New
Margin of victory		11,476	28.92%	24.90%
Turnout		39,678	45.47%	14.46%
Registered electors		92,141		
INC gain from Independent		Swing	24.86%	

=== 1957 ===
1957 Madras Legislative Assembly election: Hosur
Party	Candidate	Votes	%	±%
Independent	K. Appavu Pillai	10,305	39.60%	New
INC	N. Ramachandra Reddy	9,257	35.57%	−6.28
Independent	K. Shamanna	6,460	24.83%	New
Margin of victory		1,048	4.03%	−8.01%
Turnout		26,022	31.01%	−8.76%
Registered electors		83,913		
Independent hold		Swing	-14.30%	

=== 1952 ===
1952 Madras Legislative Assembly election: Hosur
Party	Candidate	Votes	%	±%
Independent	M. Muni Reddi	17,850	53.90%	New
INC	K. Appavu Pillai	13,863	41.86%	New
KMPP	K. Shammanna	1,406	4.25%	New
Margin of victory		3,987	12.04%	
Turnout		33,119	39.77%	
Registered electors		83,284		
Independent win (new seat)				
