= K. Appavu Pillai Memorial Bus Terminus =

Bus station in Hosur, Tamil Nadu, India

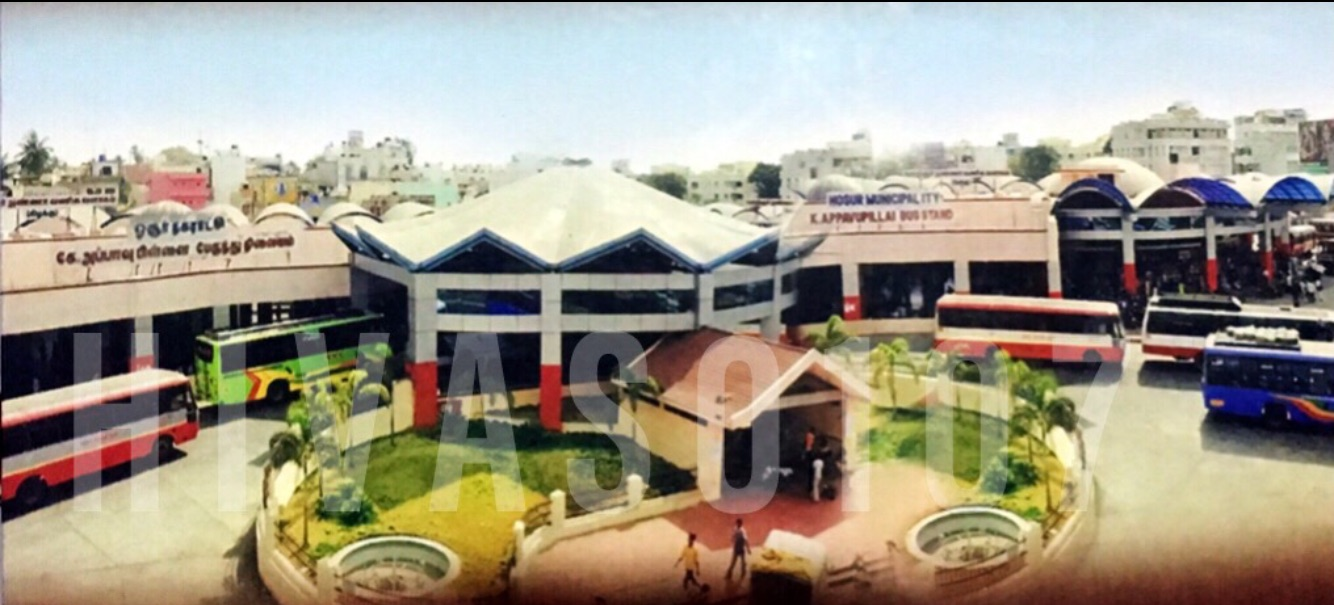
- Front of K Appavupillai Bus Stand

General information
- Location: Hosur; India
- Owner: Hosur Corporation
- Operator: Tamil Nadu State Transport Corporation

Construction
- Parking: yes
- Cycle facilities: yes
- Accessible: Disabled access

Other information
- Station code: TRI State Express Transport Corporation (Tamil Nadu); TRH Karnataka State Road Transport Corporation

History
- Rebuilt: 2010

K. Appavu Pillai Memorial Bus Terminus is located on National Highway 44, Hosur, India. The integrated bus terminus which operates both City and Moffusil Bus Terminus.

== History ==
In the early 1980s, the bus station was built and named after former MLA and Hosur town panchayat president Mr. K. Appavu Pillai. In 2007 due to the National Highway road expansion, the bus terminus was reconstructed, costing 6.80-10.5 crores. The new terminus was again named after Pillai and inaugurated by M. K. Stalin on 18 July 2010.

== Facilities ==
The terminus has 53 bus bays with modern amenities. The associated shopping complex ks named after Former Chief Minister Mr. C. N. Annadurai. It offers 48 shops on the ground floor and 28 shops on the first floor.

The terminus is managed by the municipality of Hosur. Some 2,000 buses operate there daily.

== Services ==
Local and long-distance buses stop there. Bangalore is the most frequent long-distance service. Bengaluru buses have a semi-detached area at the front of the bus stand for easy access to the passengers. Tamil Nadu State Road Transport Corporation, Karnataka, Kerala and Andhra Pradesh State Transport Corporation buses operate there.

== See also ==
- Tamil Nadu State Road Transport Corporation
