= Chandra Choodeswarar Temple =

Shiva temple in Tamil Nadu, India

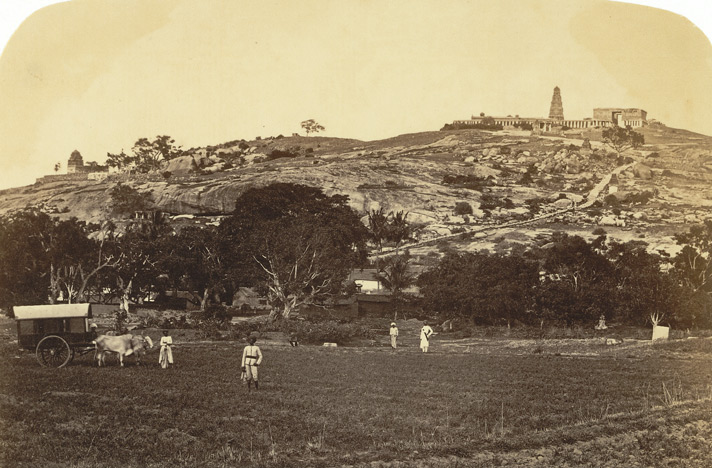
- Chandra Choodeswarar Temple, Hosur - A photo from the year 1860

Religion
- Affiliation: Hinduism
- District: Krishnagiri
- Deity: Chandra Choodeswarar (Shiva) Maragathambal (Parvati)

Location
- Location: Hosur
- State: Tamil Nadu
- Country: India
- Interactive map of Chandra Choodeswarar Temple
- Coordinates: 12.7257938°N 77.8363817°E

The Chandra Choodeswarar Temple is an ancient Shiva temple located on a rocky hill in the city of Hosur, Krishnagiri District, Tamil Nadu.

Due to variations in the local languages (Tamil, Kannada, Telugu) and dialects, the temple is also referred to as 'Chandira Choodeshwarar', 'Chandra Choodeshwara', 'Chandra Choodeshwar', 'Shri Choodeswarar' or 'Arulmigu Chandra Choodeshwarar'.

The main deities of the temple are Shiva, depicted as the Shiva linga and the Goddess Parvati, depicted as 'Maragathambal'.

== Names of the main deities ==
'Chandra Choodeswarar' means the Eshwara who wears the Moon (Chandra) as an ornament on his crest or tuft of hair on top of the head.

Shiva's consort Parvathi is worshiped here as Maragathambal. ‘Maragatham’ means green and ‘Ambal’ means mother. This is in reference to the green plants and trees (Photosynthesis), which provide sustenance to all living beings.

== Temple history ==
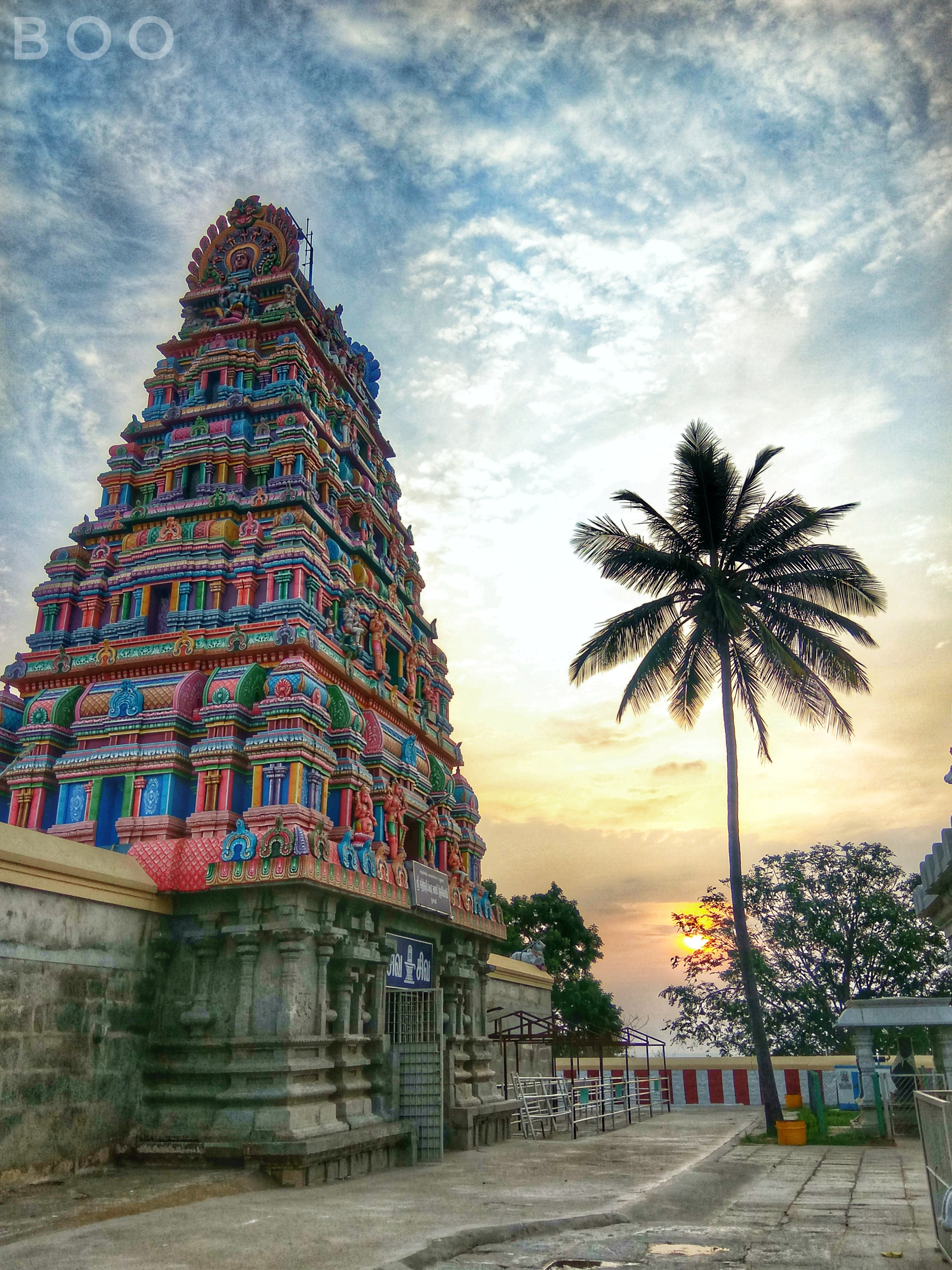
Sri Chandra Choodeswara Temple

The exact history of the temple as to when it was consecrated is not clearly documented. Considering that the Hosur region is mentioned in ancient Hindu texts like the 'Bhadragiri Mahatmyam', a part of Brahmanda Purana, a shrine for Shiva is deemed to have existed here from ancient times.

The temple has grown during the time of the Cholas, Hoysala and Vijayanagara Emperors. The Chandra Choodeshwara Temple structure may have been built by the Hoysala king, Thirupuvanamalla Barvatharaja Anthiyazhvar, in the year 1260. The 13th-century inscription found during Chandra Choodeshwara temple patronage Perumal Temple in Hosur and Bangalore Shiva Temple inscriptions tell the details of donations to Chandra Choodeshwara temple. There are also inscriptions of Rajendra Chola in this ancient temple. The temple was renovated by Azhakiya Perumal Aathimoolam.

== In popular culture ==
The Chandra Choodeshwarar Temple has been the subject of documentary in an episode of TV9's series Heegu Unte in 2013.

Year	Name of Documentary	Produced by	Viewable at
2013	TV9: "Heegu Unte": Arulmigu ChandraChoodeshwarar Temple, Hosur	TV9 Television Channel	

== Gallery ==
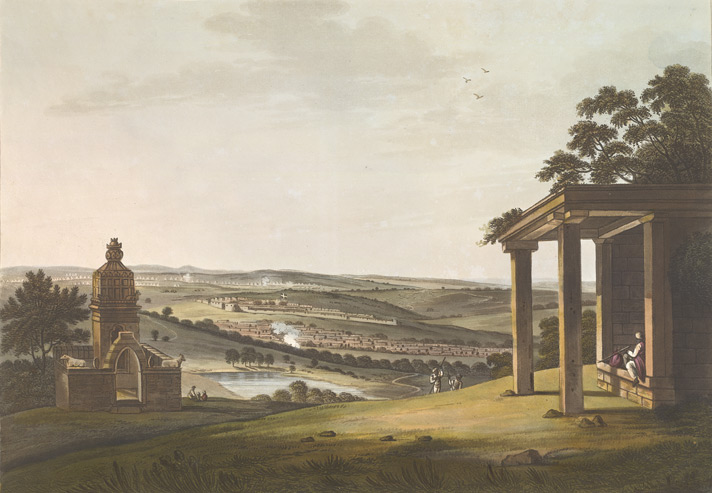

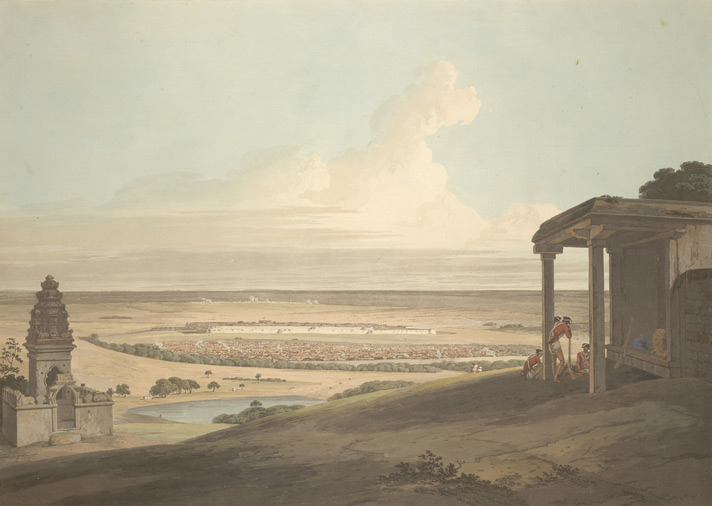

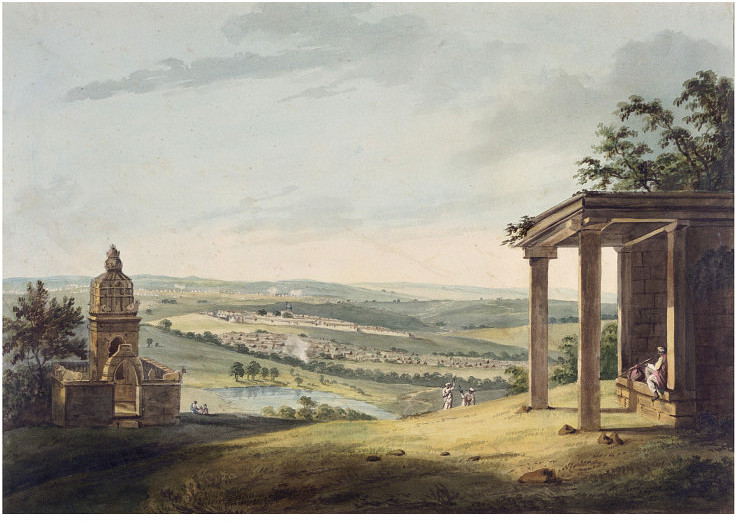

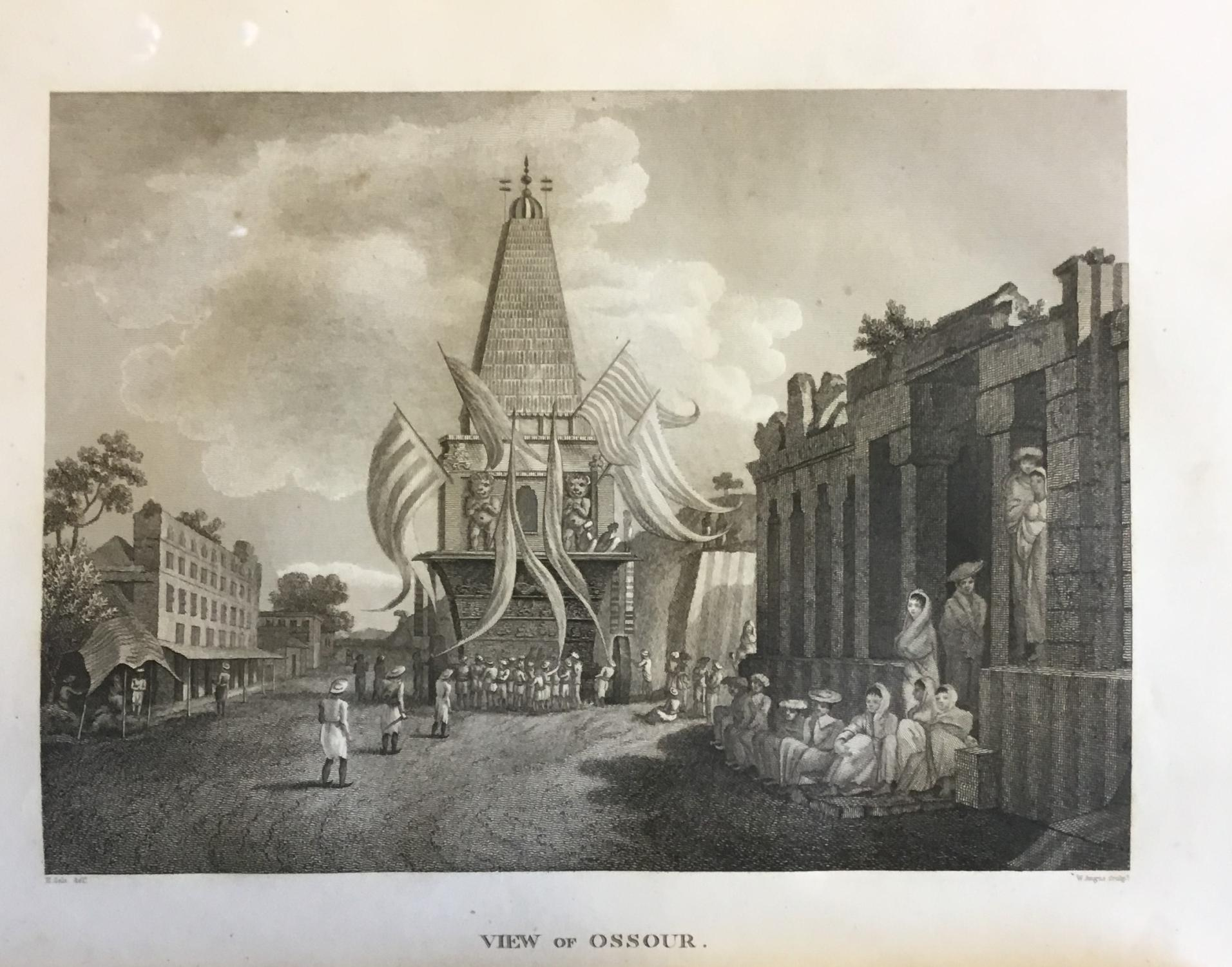
