= D. R. Rajaram =

Indian politician

D. R. Rajaram Naidu is an Indian politician and former Member of the Legislative Assembly of Tamil Nadu. He was elected to the Tamil Nadu legislative assembly from Thalli constituency as an Indian National Congress candidate in 1977 election, and as an Indian National Congress (Indira) candidate in 1980 election. He was also the candidate for parliament elections and won it successfully.
