= Thalli Assembly constituency =

State Legislative Assembly Constituency in Tamil Nadu

Coordinates: 12.59°N 77.65°E

Thalli
- Constituency No. 56 for the Tamil Nadu Legislative Assembly

Constituency details
- Country: India
- Region: South India
- State: Tamil Nadu
- District: Krishnagiri
- Lok Sabha constituency: Krishnagiri
- Established: 1977
- Total electors: 2,37,961
- Reservation: None

Member of Legislative Assembly
- 17th Tamil Nadu Legislative Assembly
- Incumbent T. Ramachandran
- Party: CPI
- Alliance: LF
- Elected year: 2026

Thalli is a state assembly constituency in Krishnagiri district in Tamil Nadu, India. Its State Assembly Constituency number is 56. It comprises a portion of Denkanikottai taluk and is a part of Krishnagiri Lok Sabha constituency for national elections to the Parliament of India. It is one of the 234 State Legislative Assembly Constituencies in Tamil Nadu in India.

== Members of Legislative Assembly ==
Year	Member	Political party
1977	D. R. Rajaram Naidu	Indian National Congress
1980	D. R. Rajaram Naidu	Indian National Congress (I)
1984	K. V. Venugopal	Indian National Congress
1989	D. C. Vijayendraiyah	Janata Party
1991	M. Venkatarama Reddy	Indian National Congress
1996	S. Raja Reddy	Communist Party of India
2001	K. V. Muralidharan	Bharatiya Janata Party
2006	T. Ramachandran	Independent
2011	T. Ramachandran	Communist Party of India
2016	Y. Prakaash	Dravida Munnetra Kazhagam
2021	T. Ramachandran	Communist Party of India
2026	T. Ramachandran	Communist Party of India

== Election results ==
Vote share of winning candidates
2026	38.02%
2021	62.82%
2016	39.31%
2011	47.90%
2006	24.24%
2001	38.33%
1996	28.78%
1991	45.88%
1989	45.96%
1984	49.05%
1980	41.53%
1977	30.53%

=== 2026 ===
2026 Tamil Nadu Legislative Assembly election: Thalli
Party	Candidate	Votes	%	±%
CPI	Ramachandran. T	78,283	38.02	▼24.80
BJP	Dr. Nagesh Kumar. C	73,043	35.48	▲1.94
TVK	Suresh. G	45,245	21.98	New
NTK	Narasimma Reddy	4,107	1.99	▲0.02
NOTA	NOTA	1,550	0.75	▼0.27
Margin of victory		5,240	2.54	▼26.74
Turnout		2,05,878	86.52	▲10.06
Registered electors		2,37,961		
CPI hold		Swing	▼24.80	

=== 2021 ===
2021 Tamil Nadu Legislative Assembly election: Thalli
Party	Candidate	Votes	%	±%
CPI	T. Ramachandran	120,641	62.82	+26.81
BJP	Dr. C. Nagesh Kumar	64,415	33.54	+32.00
NTK	R. Mary Selvarani	3,776	1.97	New
NOTA	NOTA	1,966	1.02	−0.27
Margin of victory		56,226	29.28	25.98
Turnout		192,056	76.46	−5.95
Registered electors		251,178		
CPI gain from DMK		Swing	23.51	

=== 2016 ===
2016 Tamil Nadu Legislative Assembly election: Thalli
Party	Candidate	Votes	%	±%
DMK	Y. Prakaash	74,429	39.31	−4.44
CPI	T. Ramachandran	68,184	36.01	−11.89
AIADMK	C. Nagesh	31,415	16.59	New
PMK	D. Arunrajan	5,253	2.77	New
BJP	B. Ramachandran	2,908	1.54	−1.51
NOTA	NOTA	2,450	1.29	New
Independent	V. Hari	1,722	0.91	New
NCP	R. Roselin	958	0.51	New
Margin of victory		6,245	3.30	−0.85
Turnout		189,350	82.42	−1.78
Registered electors		229,749		
DMK gain from CPI		Swing	-8.59	

=== 2011 ===
2011 Tamil Nadu Legislative Assembly election: Thalli
Party	Candidate	Votes	%	±%
CPI	T. Ramachandran	74,353	47.90	+27.36
DMK	Y. Prakaash	67,918	43.75	New
BJP	K. S. Narendiran	4,727	3.05	−7.38
Independent	F. Ayaz	3,847	2.83	New
Independent	C. Muniraj	2,376	1.53	New
BSP	R. Naseeruden	1,960	1.26	−0.16
Independent	K. Krishnappa	1,057	0.68	New
Margin of victory		6,435	4.15	0.44
Turnout		155,238	84.20	15.63
Registered electors		184,376		
CPI gain from Independent		Swing	23.65	

=== 2006 ===
2006 Tamil Nadu Legislative Assembly election: Thalli
Party	Candidate	Votes	%	±%
Independent	T. Ramachandran	30,032	24.24	New
CPI	P. Nagaraja Reddy	25,437	20.53	−11.31
JD(S)	N. S. M. Gowda	23,628	19.07	New
Independent	Y. Buttanna	20,196	16.30	New
BJP	K. V. Muralidharan	12,912	10.42	−27.91
DMDK	V. Hari	5,356	4.32	New
Independent	V. Vindai Vendan	3,032	2.45	New
BSP	R. Muniraj	1,761	1.42	−2.32
Independent	M. Sakulan	1,534	1.24	New
Margin of victory		4,595	3.71	−2.78
Turnout		123,888	68.57	11.81
Registered electors		180,674		
Independent gain from BJP		Swing	-14.09	

=== 2001 ===
2001 Tamil Nadu Legislative Assembly election: Thalli
Party	Candidate	Votes	%	±%
BJP	K. V. Muralidharan	36,738	38.33	+24.69
CPI	S. Raja Reddy	30,521	31.84	+3.06
Independent	N. Munireddy	15,226	15.88	New
BSP	S. Muni Raj	3,583	3.74	New
JD(S)	N. S. M. Gowda	3,549	3.70	New
Independent	R. Srinivasareddy	3,403	3.55	New
Independent	T. Nallappa	1,490	1.55	New
Independent	P. Krishnappa	1,343	1.40	New
Margin of victory		6,217	6.49	−1.67
Turnout		95,853	56.76	−7.64
Registered electors		168,962		
BJP gain from CPI		Swing	9.55	

=== 1996 ===
1996 Tamil Nadu Legislative Assembly election: Thalli
Party	Candidate	Votes	%	±%
CPI	S. Raja Reddy	26,427	28.78	New
INC	M. Venkatarama Reddy	18,938	20.63	−25.26
CPI(M)	M. Lagumiah	14,073	15.33	New
BJP	V. Ranga Reddi	12,521	13.64	−19.77
Independent	T. Venugopal	6,931	7.55	New
JD	B. Ramachandra Reddi	6,779	7.38	New
Independent	R. Muniraj	2,217	2.41	New
Independent	K. Gulab Jhan	1,517	1.65	New
JP	A. Kannan	1,031	1.12	New
Independent	P. Yallappa	523	0.57	New
Independent	P. Krishnappa	471	0.51	New
Margin of victory		7,489	8.16	−4.32
Turnout		91,819	64.40	4.53
Registered electors		158,379		
CPI gain from INC		Swing	-17.10	

=== 1991 ===
1991 Tamil Nadu Legislative Assembly election: Thalli
Party	Candidate	Votes	%	±%
INC	M. Venkatarama Reddy	38,831	45.88	+24.15
BJP	V. Ranga Reddi	28,270	33.41	New
JD	B. Ramachandra Reddy	14,917	17.63	New
PMK	Abdul Nasar Alias Nasar	1,412	1.67	New
THMM	K. Jaisankar	466	0.55	New
Margin of victory		10,561	12.48	−11.74
Turnout		84,627	59.87	−6.90
Registered electors		147,078		
INC gain from JP		Swing	-0.07	

=== 1989 ===
1989 Tamil Nadu Legislative Assembly election: Thalli
Party	Candidate	Votes	%	±%
JP	D. C. Vijayendriah	39,773	45.96	New
INC	K. V. V. Venugopal	18,810	21.74	−27.31
AIADMK	Then Po. Subramaniam	12,636	14.60	New
Independent	M. Lagumaiah	9,883	11.42	New
AIADMK	V. Ramdas	2,523	2.92	New
Independent	H. P. Krishn Apppa	891	1.03	New
Independent	Mariappa	878	1.01	New
Margin of victory		20,963	24.22	20.96
Turnout		86,539	66.77	−0.71
Registered electors		133,588		
JP gain from INC		Swing	-3.09	

=== 1984 ===
1984 Tamil Nadu Legislative Assembly election: Thalli
Party	Candidate	Votes	%	±%
INC	K. V. Venugopal	36,441	49.05	+7.52
JP	D. C. Vijayendriah	34,017	45.79	New
Independent	K. Nanje Gowda	2,091	2.81	New
Independent	M. Madhe Gounder	1,376	1.85	New
Margin of victory		2,424	3.26	−1.54
Turnout		74,296	67.48	11.42
Registered electors		117,654		
INC hold		Swing	7.52	

=== 1980 ===
1980 Tamil Nadu Legislative Assembly election: Thalli
Party	Candidate	Votes	%	±%
INC	D. R. Rajaram Naidu	25,558	41.53	+11.00
JP	D. C. Vijayendriah	22,601	36.72	New
CPI	N. Munireddi	13,383	21.75	New
Margin of victory		2,957	4.80	−3.70
Turnout		61,542	56.06	−6.66
Registered electors		112,047		
INC hold		Swing	11.00	

=== 1977 ===
1977 Tamil Nadu Legislative Assembly election: Thalli
Party	Candidate	Votes	%	±%
INC	D. R. Rajaram Naidu	18,559	30.53	New
JP	B. Venkataswamy	13,388	22.02	New
Independent	D. C. Vijayendriah	11,256	18.52	New
AIADMK	D. S. Rizwan	9,010	14.82	New
DMK	Then. Ramasamy	8,576	14.11	New
Margin of victory		5,171	8.51	
Turnout		60,789	62.72	
Registered electors		99,012		
INC win (new seat)				
