= K. V. Muralidharan =

Indian politician

K. V. Muralidharan is an Indian politician. He was a former member of the Tamil Nadu legislative assembly elected from Thalli constituency as a Bharatiya Janata Party candidate in 2001.
