= S. Raja Reddy =

Indian politician

S. Raja Reddy is an Indian politician and was a Member of the Legislative Assembly of Tamil Nadu. He was elected to the Tamil Nadu legislative assembly as a Communist Party of India (CPI) candidate from Thalli constituency in the 1996 election.
