= T. Venkata Reddy =

Indian politician

T. Venkata Reddy is an Indian politician and former Member of the Legislative Assembly of Tamil Nadu. He was elected to the Tamil Nadu legislative assembly from Hosur constituency as an Indian National Congress (Indira) candidate in 1980 election, and as an Indian National Congress candidate in 1984 election.
