= Bagalur, Hosur =

Bagalur
- Location within Tamil Nadu
- Coordinates: 12°49′49″N 77°51′58″E
- Country: India
- State: Tamil Nadu
- Region: Kongu Nadu
- District: Krishnagiri

Population (2001)
  - Total: 7,519

Languages
  - Language Official: Tamil
  - Regional: Kannada, Telugu
- Time zone: UTC+5:30 (IST)
- Postal code: 635103
- Vehicle registration: TN-70

Bagalur is a town on the banks of the Ponnaiyar river and is in the Hosur taluk of Krishnagiri district, Tamil Nadu state, India. The nearest city is Hosur, which is located 10 km away. This town is 5 km from the state of Karnataka.

In 2025, TamilNadu government converted Bagalur from Gram Panchayat to Nagar Panchayat. In February 2025, Bagalur also got a new sub-registrar office with jurisdiction over 67 villages.

== Education ==
Bagalur is rich in educational institutions which includes 4 Government Schools and 7 Private educational institutions.
