= Berikai =

Town in Tamil Nadu, India

Berikai shiva temple
- Country: India
- State: Tamil Nadu
- District: Krishnagiri

Languages
  - Official: Tamil
- Time zone: UTC+5:30 (IST)
- Postal code: 635103
- Vehicle registration: TN-70

Berikai is a small town in Tamil Nadu, India, located in Hosur taluk, Krishnagiri district. Berikai is a primarily a farming area.

Berikai is 1 kilometre (1 mi) from the border with the state of Karnataka and approximately 25 kilometres (16 mi) from the border with Andhra Pradesh.

== Religious festivals ==
There are many famous temples in Berikai. A perennial water spring at Dona Muneeswara Swamy temple attracts lakhs of people annually.

Hindu and Muslim festivals held in the town include Rama Navami, Ugadhi, Deepavali, Pongal and Ramajan. Sree Rama Navami is held over two days and attracts visitors from beyond the town, as does a famous 1,000 years old eshwara (Shivan) temple constructed by Cholas located in this village. The village's Siva temple is recently renovated and houses a very powerful Siva. His consort Parvathi Devi is in divine look.

Pongal is celebrated over three days in the town in January and in surrounding villages between January and May.

The fair of "Buttappa Swamy Araadana" is held every August.

== Educational Institutions ==
Schools include the Government Higher Secondary School, Vanaprastha International School, Sree Viddhya Bharathi English Medium and Government Tamil Medium, Telugu Medium and Urdu Medium Schools till 12th standard. Higher education is offered at MGR Arts and Science, Adhiyamaan College Of Engineering, Perumal Manimakkal College Of Engineering and St. John's Women's College for Girls, Sivagamiyammal College, Krishna College of Arts and Science and Arignar Anna College of Arts and Science.

== Agriculture ==
Farms in the villages around the town produce vegetables, spices and flowers.
