= N. Ramachandra Reddy =

Indian politician

N. Ramachandra Reddy is an Indian politician and former Member of the Legislative Assembly of Tamil Nadu. He was elected to the Tamil Nadu legislative assembly from Hosur constituency as an Indian National Congress candidate in 1962, 1977 and 1989 elections Hosur government hospital, ITI and many was built and developed in his time.
