= S. A. Sathya =

Indian politician

S. A. Sathya is an Indian politician and is Member of the Legislative Assembly of Tamil Nadu. He was elected to the Tamil Nadu legislative assembly as a Dravida Munnetra Kazhagam candidate from Hosur constituency in the by-election in 2019.

S. A. Sathya became Mayor of Hosur City Municipal Corporation in 2022.
