= Hosur =

Industrial city in Tamil Nadu, India

- City
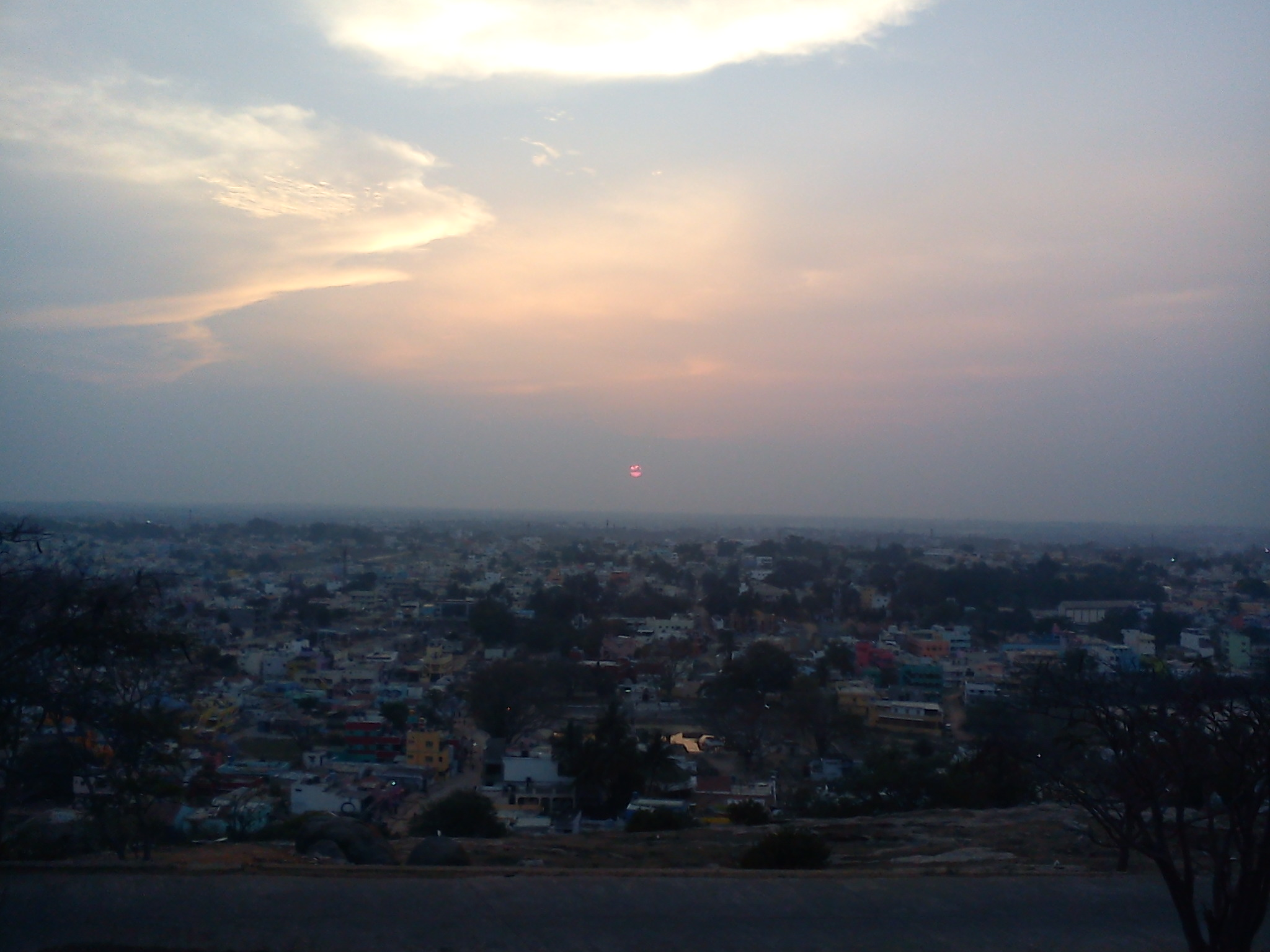
- Skyline view of Hosur city
- Nicknames: Little England, Flower City, Industrial City
- Hosur (Tamil Nadu) Hosur (India)
- Coordinates: 12.740900°N 77.825300°E
- Country: India
- State: Tamil Nadu
- District: Krishnagiri district
- Established: 13 February 2019

Government
  - Type: Mayor–Council
  - Body: Hosur City Municipal Corporation
  - Mayor: S. A. Sathya DMK
  - Corporation Commissioner: Mr. Mohammed Shabeer Alam IAS
  - Sub Collector: R. Saranya IAS

Area
  - City: 72.41 km^{2} (27.96 sq mi)
  - Urban: 59.91 km^{2} (23.13 sq mi)
- Elevation: 880 m (2,890 ft)

Population (2011)
  - City: 245,354
  - Density: 3,388/km^{2} (8,776/sq mi)
  - Urban: 229,528
  - Urban density: 3,831/km^{2} (9,923/sq mi)

Languages
  - Official: Tamil
  - Regional: Tamil, Telugu, Kannada
- Time zone: UTC+5:30 (IST)
- PIN: 635109, 635110,635126,635130
- Area code: 04344
- ISO 3166 code: 04344
- Vehicle registration: TN 70
- Sex ratio: 1000:963 ♂/♀
- Website: https://www.tnurbantree.tn.gov.in/hosur/

Hosur (Note: Tamil: Osūr) is an industrial city located in Tamil Nadu, India. It is one of the 21 municipal corporations in Tamil Nadu. It is located on the bank of the river River Ponnaiyar, 40 kilometres (25 mi) southeast of Bengaluru and 306 kilometres (190 mi) west of Chennai, the state capital. Hosur is home to major manufacturing industries including Stellantis, Ashok Leyland, Titan, TATA Electronics, TVS Motors, Caterpillar, Ather Energy, Schaeffler, and many others.

== History ==
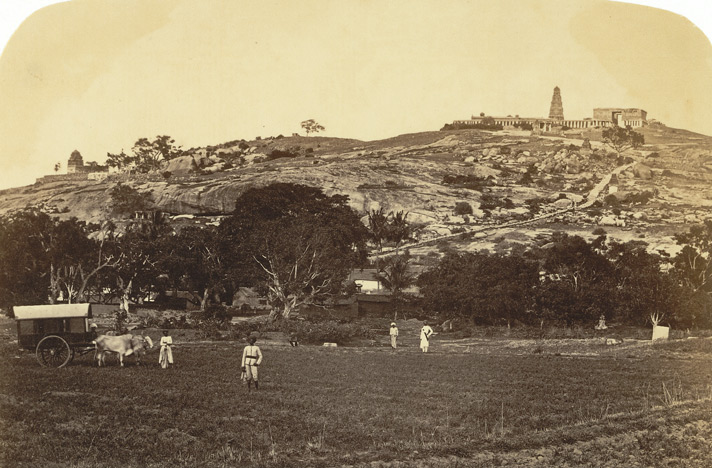
View of Chandra Choodeswarar Temple, Hosur in 1860

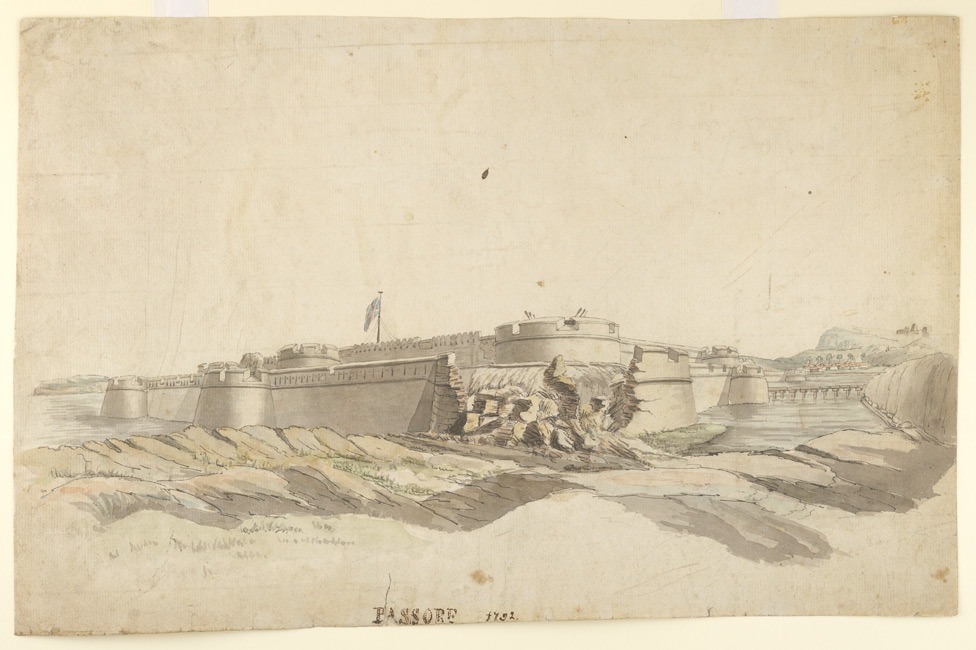
British fort used during the Third Anglo-Mysore War

Hosur was known as Murasu Nadu during the Chola period in the 13th century. From the 16th century onwards, the town has come to be known by its present name. The 11th-century Chandrachoodeshwara Swamy Temple has inscriptions that tell about the contributions made by Hoysalas. Hoysalas ruled Hosur around 1200 CE and contributed to the temple. Then it came under Vijayanagara Empire.

Later, Hosur was part of Kingdom of Mysore. From 1790 to 1792 Tipu Sultan lost the third Anglo-Mysore war to the British. In 1801 he handed over the southern part of the Mysore kingdom as a partial settlement to the Presidencies and provinces of British India. During the British period, Salem collector Walton Illiat Lockardt, made Hosur as the headquarters for Salem district.

James Hunter served as a lieutenant in the Royal Artillery. He was a military painter, and his sketches portrayed aspects of military and everyday life.

During 1980s industrialization began with the help of State Industries Promotion Corporation of Tamil Nadu and Hosur became an Industrial Town. After that the basic development started taking place.

In April 2022, plans to expand the city limit into 740 square kilometres were announced.

== Administration ==
Hosur city is governed by Hosur City Municipal Corporation, which was established in 2019. The city is divided into four administrative zones – East, West, North, and South. The corporation is headed by a mayor. The mayor and councillors of the city are elected through a popular vote by the residents.

Hosur town was constituted as a selection grade town panchayat in 1962. It was upgraded to asecond grade municipality in 1992 and to a selection grade municipality in 1998. Hosur Municipal Corporation formed in 2019 and became one of the 21 municipal corporations in Tamil Nadu.

In 2011, the town panchayat of Mathigiri and village panchayats of Zuzuvadi, Mookandapalli, Avalapalli and Chennathur were included in Hosur Municipality and upgraded as a special grade municipality. On 13 February 2019, Hosur was upgraded as the 13th corporation city of Tamil Nadu, comprising the adjoining areas, and the city limits were expanded to 72.41 square kilometres.

== Climate ==
Hosur experiences a tropical savanna climate (Köppen climate classification) with distinct wet and dry seasons. Due to its high elevation, Hosur usually enjoys salubrious and moderate climate throughout the year, with occasional heat waves. The coolest month is January with an average low temperature of 17.1 °C and the hottest month is May with an average high temperature of 33.6 °C. Winter temperatures rarely drop below 12 °C with the lowest ever recorded temperature of 7.1 °C recorded on 1 February 2018 and summer temperatures seldom exceed 35 °C. Hosur receives rainfall from both the northeast and the southwest monsoons and the wettest months are October, September, and August, in that order. The summer heat is moderated by fairly frequent thunderstorms but with occasional flooding. Average humidity is 31% and average rainfall is 84 cm.

Climate data for Hosur
Month	Jan	Feb	Mar	Apr	May	Jun	Jul	Aug	Sep	Oct	Nov	Dec	Year
Mean daily maximum °C (°F)	26.9 (80.4)	29.4 (84.9)	33.0 (91.4)	33.3 (91.9)	33.2 (91.8)	29.3 (84.7)	28.2 (82.8)	28.4 (83.1)	28.8 (83.8)	28.1 (82.6)	27.4 (81.3)	26.4 (79.5)	29.4 (84.9)
Mean daily minimum °C (°F)	14.8 (58.6)	16.2 (61.2)	18.6 (65.5)	21.1 (70.0)	21.3 (70.3)	20.3 (68.5)	19.6 (67.3)	19.7 (67.5)	19.4 (66.9)	19.1 (66.4)	17.2 (63.0)	15.5 (59.9)	18.6 (65.4)
Average rainfall mm (inches)	7 (0.3)	8 (0.3)	3 (0.1)	62 (2.4)	94 (3.7)	63 (2.5)	78 (3.1)	101 (4.0)	134 (5.3)	179 (7.0)	65 (2.6)	15 (0.6)	809 (31.9)
Source: en.climate-data.org,

== Demographics ==
Religious census
Religion	Percent(%)
Hindu	83.66%
Muslim	11.37%
Christian	4.50%
Other	0.47%

Languages in Hosur City (2011)
1. Tamil (52.0%)
2. Telugu (25.1%)
3. Urdu (10.7%)
4. Kannada (8.13%)
5. Hindi (1.67%)
6. Malayalam (1.19%)
7. Others (1.23%)
Languages in Hosur taluk (2011)
1. Tamil (42.1%)
2. Telugu (32.2%)
3. Kannada (17.1%)
4. Urdu (5.56%)
5. Hindi (1.18%)
6. Malayalam (0.77%)
7. Others (1.09%)

Historical population
Year	Pop.	±%
1901	6,695	—
1911	5,913	−11.7%
1921	6,519	+10.2%
1931	6,071	−6.9%
1941	6,457	+6.4%
1951	8,712	+34.9%
1961		—
1971		—
1981	27,129	—
1991	41,739	+53.9%
2001	84,394	+102.2%
2011	116,821	+38.4%
Sources:https://censusindia.gov.in/nada/index.php/catalog/31753

According to the 2011 census, Hosur had a population of 116,821 with a sex ratio of 968 females for every 1,000 males, much above the national average of 929. A total of 14,307 were under the age of six, constituting 7,274 males and 7,033 females. Scheduled Castes and Scheduled Tribes accounted for 8.08% and 0.17% of the population, respectively. The average literacy of the city was 76.69%, compared to the national average of 72.99%. The city had a total of 29,255 households. There were a total of 43,959 workers, comprising 212 cultivators, 308 main agricultural labourers, 747 in household industries, 38,463 other workers, 4,229 marginal workers, 57 marginal cultivators, 62 marginal agricultural laborers, 189 marginal workers in household industries and 3,921 other marginal workers.

As per the religious census of 2011, Hosur had 83.66% Hindus, 11.37% Muslims, 4.5% Christians, 0.05% Sikhs, 0.02% Buddhists, 0.11% Jains, 0.27% following other religions and 0.02% following no religion or did not indicate any religious preference.

Tamil is the official language and is spoken by the majority of the people. Telugu and Kannada are also widely spoken, since the town was part of Mysore Kingdom prior to linguistic reorganization of states in 1956.

== Economy ==
Hosur is an industrial hub and houses several automobile and manufacturing industries. Major companies include: TVS Motors, Ashok Leyland, Titan, Sundaram Clayton, Harita Seatings, Harita Fehrer, General Electric, Kansai Nerolac Paints, Mylan, GRB Foods, Kamaz Vectra Motors, Alstom, Faiveley Transport, Caterpillar Inc., Carborundum Universal, Exide Industries Ltd, Hindustan Motors, Ion Exchange (India) Limited, Hindustan Unilever, Schaeffler, TTK Prestige, Tab India Granites Pvt Ltd, Bata Shoes, Del Monte Foods, Nippon Electricals, Wendt, Toyota Boshoku, Nilkamal Plastics and Reckitt Benckiser. There are plans for the development of an Information Technology Special Economic Zone near Hosur. ELCOT has called for applications for the allotment of land in the IT Park of Hosur in the month of June 2010. Proximity to Bangalore is seen as an advantage. Many startup IT companies prefer Hosur for their initial operations. In December 2019, electric vehicle manufacturer Ather Energy signed an MoU with Government of Tamil Nadu to set up a 400,000 sq ft (37,000 m^{2}) manufacturing plant., Carborundum Universal Limited

A variety of fruits and vegetables are cultivated around Hosur. The land is very fertile and there is significant access to fresh water as well as labor. Crops consist of tomatoes, cabbages, onions, mangoes, capsicum, carrot, cucumber, beans, coriander leaves, turnips and radishes. Roses are also grown in large numbers. District Livestock Farm was started in 1824. Central Sericultural Germplasm Resources Centre (CSGRC) was established in 1991 to protect and conserve mulberry and silkworm germ plasm resources. In July 2019, the government announced the construction of an international flower auction centre with quality control laboratory, cold storage facility, administrative building and an electronic auction hall at a cost of ₹202 million. It will deal with flowers cultivated on 3,702 hectares in the district, which are also exported to Australia, Singapore, and Malaysia.

== Transport ==
=== Road ===
National Highway AH43 (NH 44) passes through Hosur connecting it with Bangalore, Chennai, Salem, Madurai and Kanyakumari. This stretch of the highway passing through the city is the Chennai–Mumbai arm of the Golden Quadrilateral highway. NH 648 and NH 844 also connect with Hosur to other cities.

=== Rail ===
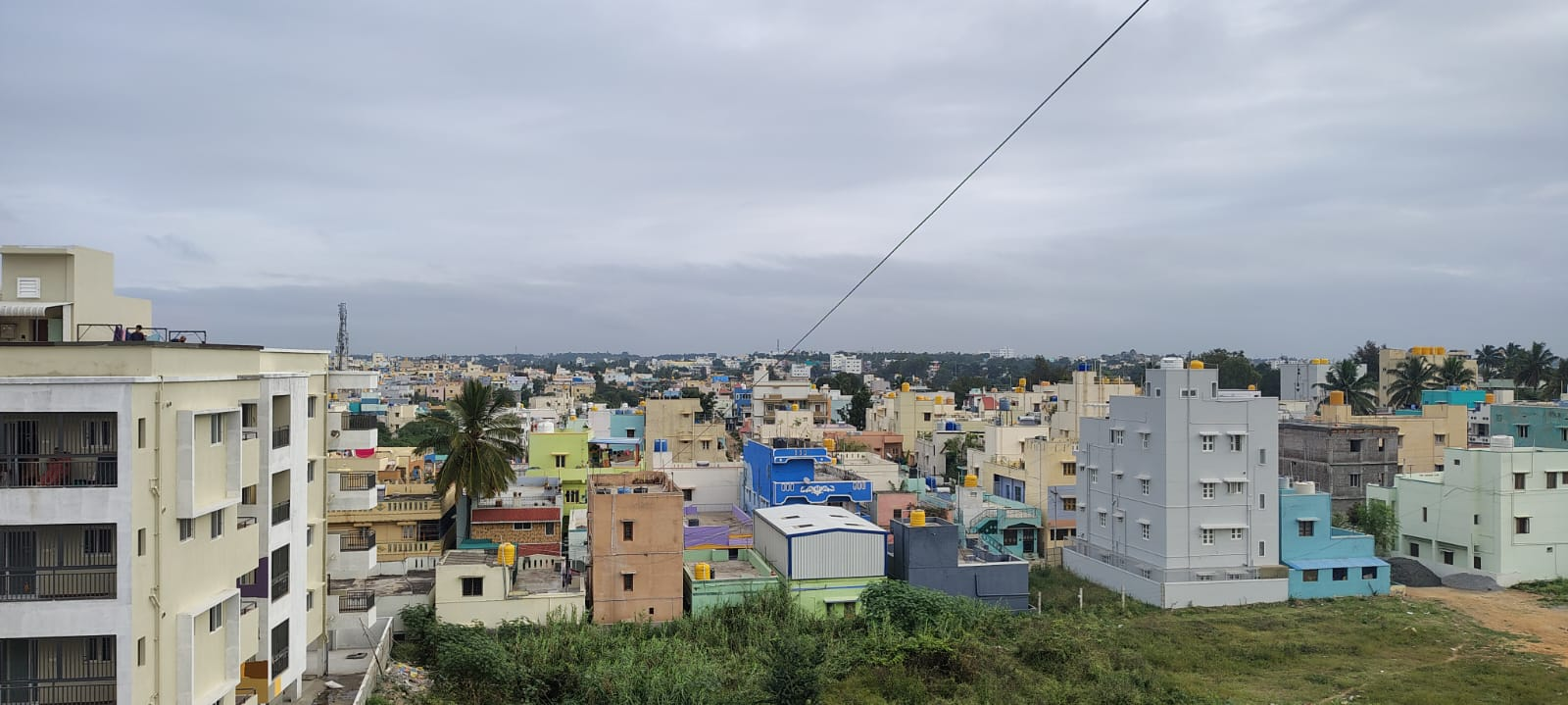
Panoramic view of Hosur city

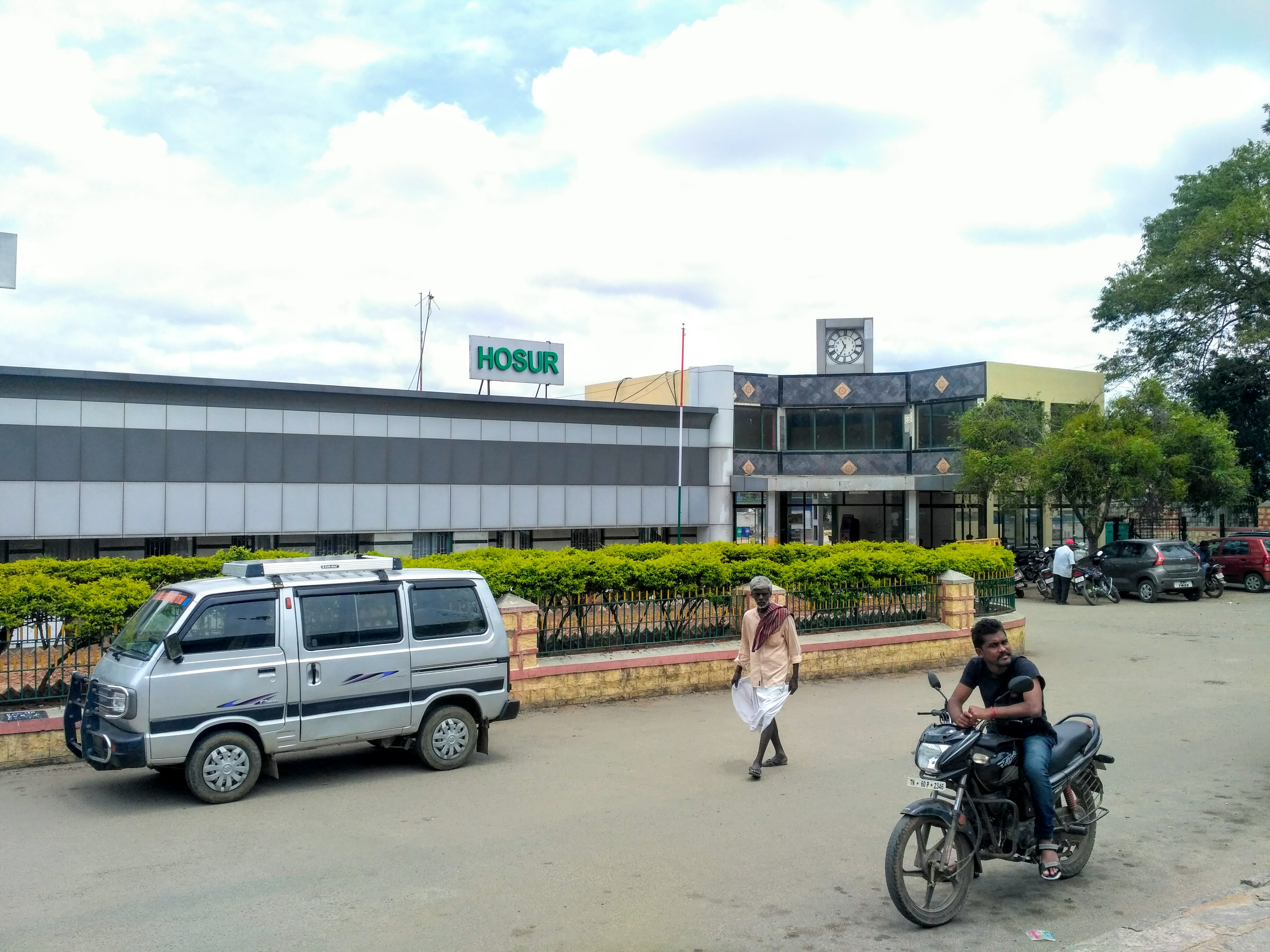
Hosur Railway station

Hosur has a railway station, located on the Bengaluru–Salem railway line and falls under the Bengaluru Division of the South Western Railway. Hosur is well connected to major cities across the country by rail. There are frequent passenger trains between Hosur and Bengaluru. It has three rail tracks, two for passenger trains, intercity, express trains, and another for freight

=== Bus ===
Hosur has a central bus station which was re-constructed and named after Father of Hosur, veteran politician K. Appavu Pillai and inaugurated by M. K. Stalin on 18 July 2010. TNSTC (Tamil Nadu State Transport Corporation) Salem Division buses connect Hosur to major cities and towns in Tamil Nadu and also to neighboring states. Several private bus services, KSRTC (Karnataka State Road Transport Corporation), APSRTC (Andhra Pradesh State Road Transport Corporation), PRTC (Pondicherry Road Transport Corporation) also operate from the city.

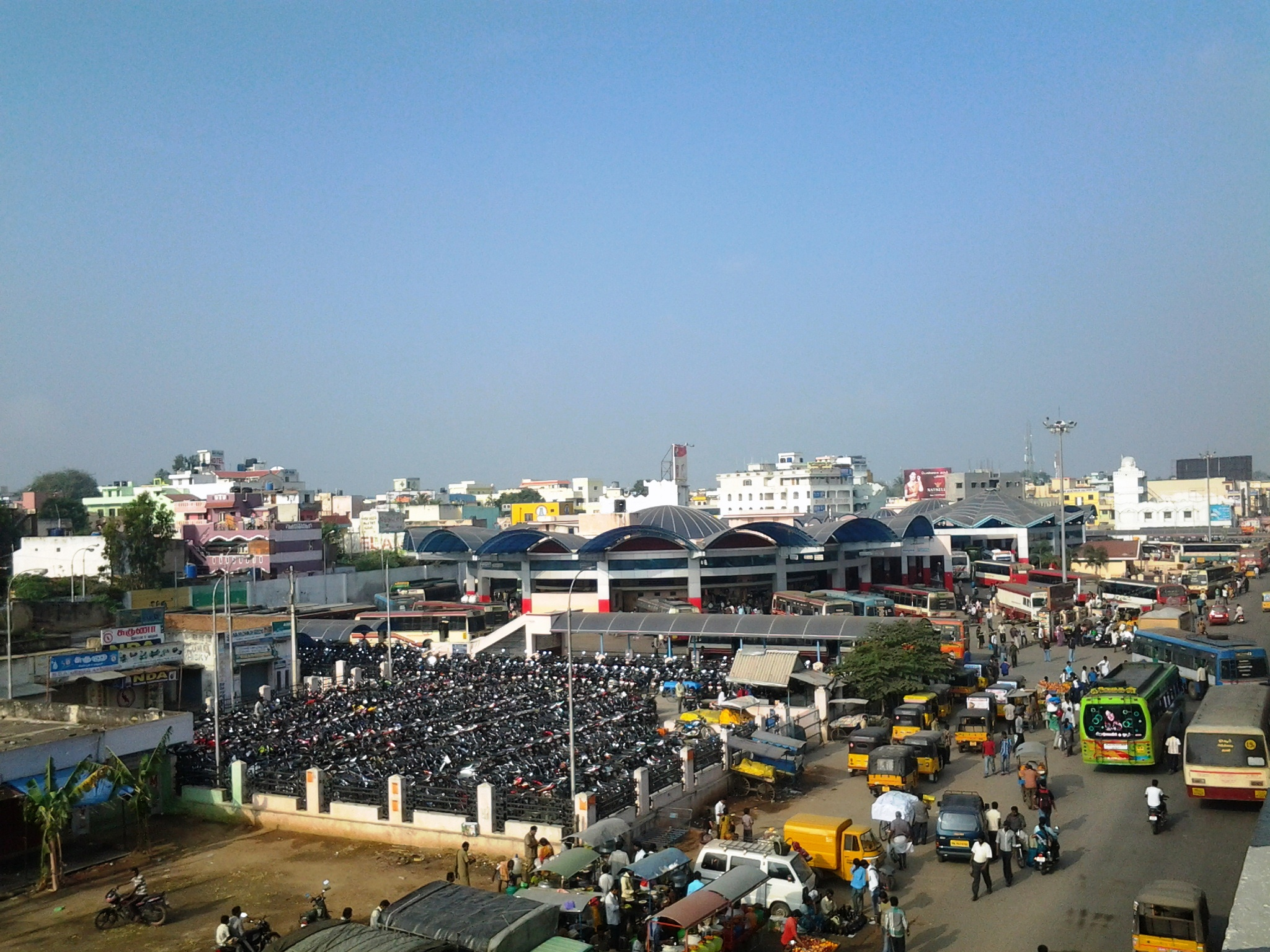
Aerial view of Hosur bus station

=== Air ===
The nearest major airport is the Kempegowda International Airport, about 75 km from Hosur.

In August 2025, the Tamil Nadu government decided to build a greenfield airport for Hosur, located between Berigai and Bagalur in Shoolagiri Taluk. An estimated 2,300 acres of land will be required for the project. The government already owns about 650 acres in the area .

Hosur Aerodrome, established in 1994, is a private aerodrome that is used for routine maintenance and inspections of aircraft.

== Places of interest ==
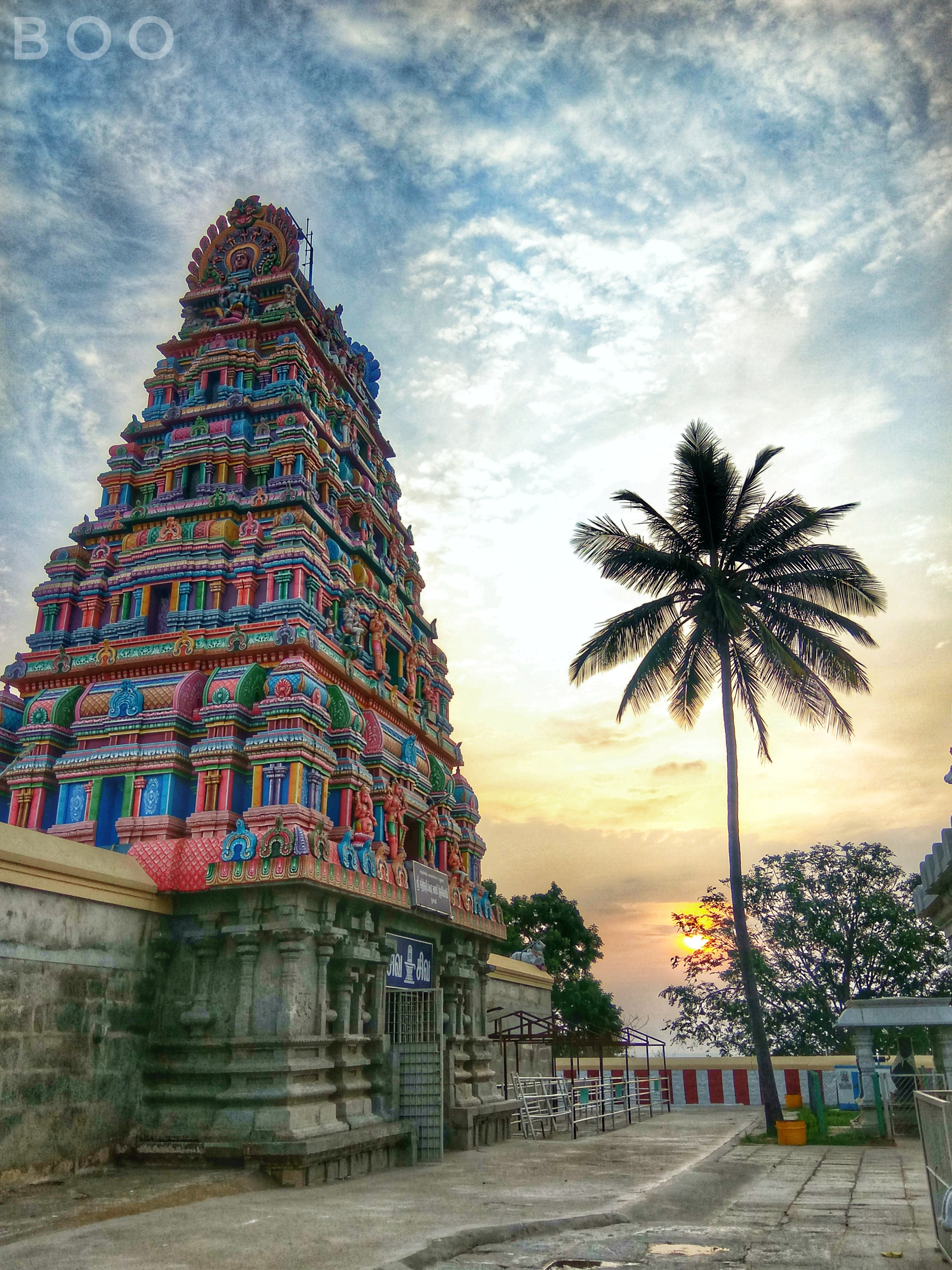
Sri Chandra Choodeswara Temple

- Rajaji Memorial at Thorapalli where Rajaji was born
- Sri Chandrachoodeshwara Temple
- Ecological Park & Walkers Lane at Rama Naicken Lake.
- Kelavarapalli Reservoir Project is one of the prime attractions at Hosur. Kelavarapalli Reservoir Project or Kelavarapalli Dam is 10 km away from Hosur and 8 km from Karnataka, across the River Ponniar, which originates from the eastern slopes of Chennakesava Hills.
- Dakshina Thirupathi Temple at the entrance of Sanamavu forest alongside Bengaluru Highway
- Shree Parshwa Susheel Dham Swetamber Jain Temple - famous Jain temple, 19 km away from Hosur.
