= B. Venkataswamy =

Indian politician

B. Venkataswamy (12 May 1935 – 21 October 2023) was an Indian politician and former Member of the Legislative Assembly of Tamil Nadu. He was born on 12 May 1935. He has completed his intermediate in St Josephs college(Bangalore). He has worked as a teacher between 1956 and 1962 and was president of teachers association of Hosur and Denkanikotta taluks. He was elected to the Tamil Nadu legislative assembly from Hosur constituency as a Swatantra Party candidate in 1967, and 1971 elections and as a Janata Dal candidate in 1996 election
