= Kodiveri Dam =

Dam in Tamil Nadu, India

Kodiveri dam
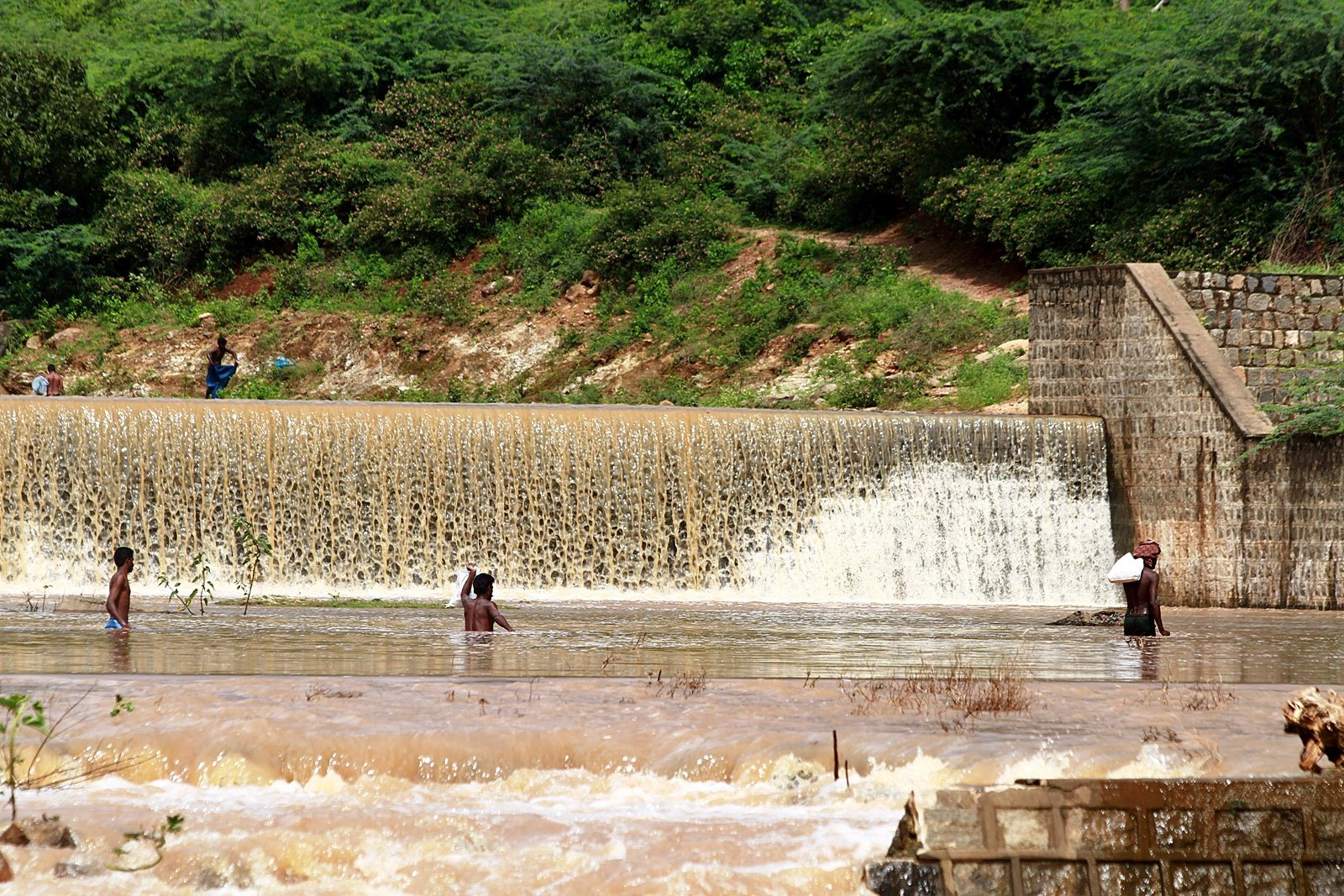
- Interactive map of Kodiveri dam
- Official name: Kodiveri anaicut
- Country: India
- Location: Akkarai Kodiveri, Gobichettipalayam Taluk, Tamil Nadu
- Coordinates: 11°28′23″N 77°17′47″E
- Purpose: Irrigation
- Status: In use
- Opening date: 1125 AD (canal); 17th century (dam)
- Owner: Government of Tamil Nadu

Dam and spillways
- Impounds: Bhavani River

Reservoir
- Creates: Kodiveri

Kodiveri Dam is a masonry dam located on the Bhavani River in Gobichettipalayam taluk, Erode district in the Indian state of Tamil Nadu. The dam is situated along the State Highway 15 about 15 km (9.3 mi) from Gobichettipalayam towards Sathyamangalam in the western region of the state.

== Etymology ==
The name ‘Kodiveri’ originated from ‘kodivari’ meaning tiger in Tamil. This might be due to the presence of the dam in a forest area where a number of tigers lived.

== History ==
The Kodiveri Dam was constructed across the Bhavani River in 1125 CE by Urali Semba Vettuva Jayankonda Chola Kongalvan. He ruled the Vadakarai Nadu—one of the twenty-four regions of the Kongu territory—during the reign of Kulothunga Chola I (1070–1125 CE). As the Kodiveri area lacked the necessary stone for the dam's construction, rocks were quarried at Kalkadambur (near Kambathrayan Hill), located approximately 10 km north of Sathyamangalam, and transported to the site using elephants. Skilled stone sculptors and laborers from the states of Odisha, Karnataka, and Andhra Pradesh were brought in for this massive undertaking. In the construction of the dam, massive stone blocks were stacked upon one another and bonded together using iron and lead.

The construction of the dam was completed in about three years. Arrangements were made for the King to visit and inaugurate it; however, a sudden, massive flood completely washed the dam away. Upon receiving this news, the King ordered the dam to be rebuilt. It was reconstructed in approximately one and a half years. Just as the King was preparing to inaugurate it again, another flood struck. This time, thousands of people lost their lives.

Deeply distressed, the King declared, "Goddess Bannari Amman and Lord Nanjundeshwara are preventing me from visiting that place. Neither I nor my family shall ever go there again." He ordered the dam to be rebuilt once more but instructed that he should not be informed upon its completion. Consequently, the dam was built for the third time. This is the Kodiveri Dam that stands to this day; it was constructed with a length of 151 meters and a width of 30 feet.

== Hydrography ==
The dam is built on the Bhavani River. Two channels arise from the dam, Arrakkankottai on the northern side of Bhavani River and Thadapalli on the southern side. Lands north of Gobichettipalayam are irrigated by Thadapalli channel and cultivation of sugarcane and paddy are predominant in this area. The dam irrigates an area of 24,504 acres (9,916 ha).

== Recreation ==
The dam is a popular tourist spot. The park, associated play area and coracle rides are the main attractions.

== See also ==
- List of reservoirs and dams in India
