= Kadasellipalayam =

Panchayat village in India

- Panchayat village
- Location in Tamil Nadu, India Kadasellipalayam (India)
- Coordinates: 11°21′32″N 77°22′24″E
- Country: India
- State: Tamil Nadu
- Region: Coimbatore (Kongu Nadu)
- District: Erode
- Taluk: Gobichettipalayam

Languages
  - Official: Tamil
- Time zone: UTC+5:30 (IST)
- Telephone code: 91(04285)
- Vehicle registration: TN 36

Kadasellipalayam is a panchayat village in Gobichettipalayam taluk in Erode District of Tamil Nadu state, India. It is about 20 km from Gobichettipalayam and 55 km from district headquarters Erode. The village is located on the road connecting Gobichettipalayam with Nambiyur via Kolappalur. Kadasellipalayam has a population of about 355.
