= Nanjai Puliampatti =

Panchayat village in India

- Panchayat village
- Location in Tamil Nadu, India Nanjai Puliampatti (India)
- Coordinates: 11°29′42″N 77°24′36″E
- Country: India
- State: Tamil Nadu
- Region: Coimbatore (Kongu Nadu)
- District: Erode
- Taluk: Gobichettipalayam

Languages
  - Official: Tamil
- Time zone: UTC+5:30 (IST)
- PIN: 638506
- Telephone code: 91(04285)
- Vehicle registration: TN 36

Nanjai Puliampatti is a panchayat village in Gobichettipalayam taluk in Erode District of Tamil Nadu state, India. It is about 9 km from Gobichettipalayam and 45 km from the district headquarters, Erode. The village is located along the road connecting Gobichettipalayam to Sathyamangalam via Vaniputhur. Nanjai Puliampatti has a population of about 1504.
