= Avalampalayam =

- Panchayat village
- Location in Tamil Nadu, India Avalampalayam (India)
- Coordinates: 11°21′27″N 77°22′4″E
- Country: India
- State: Tamil Nadu
- Region: Coimbatore (Kongu Nadu)
- District: Erode
- Taluk: Gobichettipalayam

Languages
  - Official: Tamil
- Time zone: UTC+5:30 (IST)
- PIN: 638458
- Telephone code: 91(04285)
- Vehicle registration: TN 36

Avalampalayam is a panchayat village in Gobichettipalayam taluk in Erode District of Tamil Nadu state, India. It is about 20 km from Gobichettipalayam and 45 km from district headquarters Erode. The village is located on the road connecting Gobichettipalayam with Nambiyur via Kolappalur. Avalampalayam has a population of about 960.
