= Sinnaripalayam =

Panchayat village in India

- Panchayat village
- Location in Tamil Nadu, India Sinnaripalayam (India)
- Coordinates: 11°21′17″N 77°23′39″E
- Country: India
- State: Tamil Nadu
- Region: Coimbatore (Kongu Nadu)
- District: Erode
- Taluk: Gobichettipalayam

Languages
  - Official: Tamil
- Time zone: UTC+5:30 (IST)
- Telephone code: 91(04285)
- Vehicle registration: TN 36

Sinnaripalayam is a panchayat village in Gobichettipalayam taluk in Erode District of Tamil Nadu state, India. It is about 16 km from Gobichettipalayam and 43 km from district headquarters Erode. The village is located on the road connecting Gobichettipalayam with Nambiyur via Kolappalur. Sinnaripalayam has a population of about 2439.
