= Pullappanaickenpalayam =

Panchayat village in India

- Panchayat village
- Location in Tamil Nadu, India Pullappanaickenpalayam (India)
- Coordinates: 11°29′47″N 77°19′7″E
- Country: India
- State: Tamil Nadu
- Region: Coimbatore (Kongu Nadu)
- District: Erode
- Taluk: Gobichettipalayam

Languages
  - Official: Tamil
- Time zone: UTC+5:30 (IST)
- Telephone code: 91(04285)
- Vehicle registration: TN 36

Pullappanaickenpalayam is a panchayat village in Gobichettipalayam taluk in Erode District of Tamil Nadu state, India. It is about 20 km from Gobichettipalayam and 55 km from district headquarters Erode. The village is located on the road connecting Gobichettipalayam with Sathyamangalam via Vaniputhur. Pullappanaickenpalayam has a population of about 2931.
