= Talguni =

Panchayat village in India

- Panchayat village
- Location in Tamil Nadu, India Talguni (India)
- Coordinates: 11°22′34″N 77°24′5″E
- Country: India
- State: Tamil Nadu
- Region: Coimbatore (Kongu Nadu)
- District: Erode
- Taluk: Gobichettipalayam

Languages
  - Official: Tamil
- Time zone: UTC+5:30 (IST)
- PIN: 638456
- Telephone code: 91(04285)
- Vehicle registration: TN 36

Talguni is a panchayat village in Gobichettipalayam taluk in Erode District of Tamil Nadu state, India. It is about 12 km from Gobichettipalayam and 50 km from district headquarters Erode. The village is located on the road connecting Gobichettipalayam with Nambiyur via Kolappalur. Talguni has a population of about 1456.
