= Punjaithuraipalayam =

Panchayat village in India

Punjaithuraiyampalayam
- Panchayat village
- Location in Punjaithuraiyampalayam, Gobichettipalayam, Tamil Nadu, India Punjaithuraiyampalayam (India)
- Coordinates: 11°30′23″N 77°23′56″E
- Country: India
- State: Tamil Nadu
- Region: Erode (Kongu Nadu)
- District: Erode
- Taluk: Gobichettipalayam

Languages
  - Official: Tamil
- Time zone: UTC+5:30 (IST)
- PIN: 638506
- Telephone code: 91(04285)
- Vehicle registration: TN36

Punjaithuraiyampalayam is a panchayat village in Gobichettipalayam taluk in Erode District of Tamil Nadu state, India. It is about 11 km from Gobichettipalayam and 46 km from district headquarters Erode. The village is located on the road connecting Gobichettipalayam with Sathyamangalam via Vaniputhur. Punjaithuraiyampalayam has a population of about 8312.
