= Kanakampalayam =

Panchayat village in India

- Panchayat village
- Location in Tamil Nadu, India Kanakampalayam (India)
- Coordinates: 11°31′20″N 77°26′53″E
- Country: India
- State: Tamil Nadu
- Region: Coimbatore (Kongu Nadu)
- District: Erode
- Taluk: Gobichettipalayam

Languages
  - Official: Tamil
- Time zone: UTC+5:30 (IST)
- PIN: 638505
- Telephone code: 91(04285)
- Vehicle registration: TN 36

Kanakampalayam is a panchayat village in Gobichettipalayam taluk in Erode District of Tamil Nadu state, India. It is about 10 km from Gobichettipalayam and 47 km from district headquarters Erode. The village is located on the road connecting Gobichettipalayam with Athani, Tamil Nadu. Kanakampalayam has a population of about 6209.
