= Ayalur =

Panchayat village in India

- Panchayat village
- Location in Tamil Nadu, India Ayalur (India)
- Coordinates: 11°24′25″N 77°23′27″E
- Country: India
- State: Tamil Nadu
- Region: Coimbatore (Kongu Nadu)
- District: Erode
- Taluk: Gobichettipalayam

Languages
  - Official: Tamil
- Time zone: UTC+5:30 (IST)
- PIN: 638458
- Telephone code: 91(04285)
- Vehicle registration: TN 36

Ayalur is a panchayat village in Gobichettipalayam taluk in Erode District of Tamil Nadu state, India. It is about 10 km from Gobichettipalayam and 45 km from district headquarters Erode. The village is located on the road connecting Gobichettipalayam with Kolappalur. Ayalur has a population of about 5980.
