= Vemandampalayam =

Panchayat village in India

- Panchayat village
- Location in Tamil Nadu, India Vemandampalayam (India)
- Coordinates: 11°19′24″N 77°14′32″E
- Country: India
- State: Tamil Nadu
- Region: Coimbatore (Kongu Nadu)
- District: Erode
- Taluk: Gobichettipalayam

Languages
  - Official: Tamil
- Time zone: UTC+5:30 (IST)
- Telephone code: 91(04285)
- Vehicle registration: TN 36

Vemandampalayam is a panchayat village in Gobichettipalayam taluk in Erode District of Tamil Nadu state, India. It is about 33 km from Gobichettipalayam and 70 km from district headquarters Erode. The village is located on the road connecting Gobichettipalayam with Avinashi and also Nambiyur to Punjai Puliampatti. Vemandampalayam has a population of about 3610.
