= Perumugai =

Panchayat village in India

- Panchayat village
- Location in Tamil Nadu, India Perumugai (India)
- Coordinates: 11°31′5″N 77°28′33″E
- Country: India
- State: Tamil Nadu
- Region: Coimbatore (Kongu Nadu)
- District: Erode
- Taluk: Gobichettipalayam

Languages
  - Official: Tamil
- Time zone: UTC+5:30 (IST)
- Telephone code: 91(04285)
- Vehicle registration: TN 36

Perumugai is a panchayat village in Gobichettipalayam taluk in Erode District of Tamil Nadu state, India. It is about 12 kilometres (7.5 mi) from Gobichettipalayam and 442 kilometres (275 mi) from the district headquarters Erode. The village is located on the road connecting Gobichettipalayam with Athani via Kallipatti. Perumugai has a population of 8,692.
