= Nanjai Gobi =

Panchayat village in India

- Panchayat village
- Location in Tamil Nadu, India Nanjai Gobi (India)
- Coordinates: 11°28′15″N 77°28′2″E
- Country: India
- State: Tamil Nadu
- Region: Coimbatore (Kongu Nadu)
- District: Erode
- Taluk: Gobichettipalayam

Languages
  - Official: Tamil
- Time zone: UTC+5:30 (IST)
- Telephone code: 91(04285)
- Vehicle registration: TN 36

Nanjai Gobi is a panchayat village in Gobichettipalayam taluk in Erode District of Tamil Nadu state, India. It is about 6 km from Gobichettipalayam and 36 km from district headquarters Erode. The village is located on the road connecting Gobichettipalayam with Athani, Tamil Nadu. Nanjai Gobi has a population of about 1589.
