= Singiripalayam =

Panchayat village in India

- Panchayat village
- Location in Tamil Nadu, India Singiripalayam (India)
- Coordinates: 11°27′36″N 77°18′47″E
- Country: India
- State: Tamil Nadu
- Region: Coimbatore (Kongu Nadu)
- District: Erode
- Taluk: Gobichettipalayam

Languages
  - Official: Tamil
- Time zone: UTC+5:30 (IST)
- PIN: 638454
- Telephone code: 91(04285)
- Vehicle registration: TN 36

Singiripalayam is a panchayat village in Gobichettipalayam taluk in Erode District of Tamil Nadu state, India. It is about 13 km from Gobichettipalayam and 42 km from district headquarters Erode. The village is located on the road connecting Gobichettipalayam with Sathyamangalam. Singiripalayam has a population of about 820.
