= Kongarpalayam =

Panchayat village in India

- Panchayat village
- Location in Tamil Nadu, India Kongarpalayam (India)
- Coordinates: 11°30′58″N 77°21′44″E
- Country: India
- State: Tamil Nadu
- Region: Coimbatore
- District: Erode
- Taluk: Gobichettipalayam

Languages
  - Official: Tamil
- Time zone: UTC+5:30 (IST)
- PIN: 638506
- Telephone code: 91(04285)
- Vehicle registration: TN 36

Kongarpalayam is a panchayat village in Gobichettipalayam taluk in Erode District of Tamil Nadu state, India. It is about 16 km from Gobichettipalayam and km from district headquarters Erode. The village is located on the road connecting Gobichettipalayam with Sathyamangalam via Vaniputhur. Kongarpalayam has a population of about 5346.
