= Karattupalayam =

Village in India

- village
- Country: India
- State: Tamil Nadu
- District: Erode

Government
  - Body: Karattupalayam

Population
  - Total: 7,835

Languages
  - Official: Tamil
- Time zone: UTC+5:30 (IST)
- PIN: 638457
- Vehicle registration: TN 36
- Nearest city: Gobichettipalayam
- Lok Sabha constituency: Tirupur
- Vidhan Sabha constituency: Gobichettipalayam

Karattupalayam is a village in Nambiyur block in Gobichettipalayam taluk of Erode District in Tamil Nadu State in India. Karattupalayam is 11 km distance from Nambiyur. It is situated about 10 km from Gobichettipalayam and 43.8 km distance from Erode. The total population of Karattupalayam is 7835 with 3935 male and 3900 female according to census 2011.
