= Koshanam =

Panchayat village in India

- Panchayat village
- Location in Tamil Nadu, India Koshanam (India)
- Coordinates: 11°22′49″N 77°19′51″E
- Country: India
- State: Tamil Nadu
- Region: Coimbatore (Kongu Nadu)
- District: Erode
- Taluk: Gobichettipalayam

Languages
  - Official: Tamil
- Time zone: UTC+5:30 (IST)
- PIN: 638458
- Telephone code: 91(04285)
- Vehicle registration: TN 36

Koshanam is a panchayat village in Gobichettipalayam taluk in Erode District of Tamil Nadu state, India. It is about 18 km from Gobichettipalayam and 53 km from district headquarters Erode. The village is located on the road connecting Gobichettipalayam with Nambiyur. After Nambiyur declared as an Taluk, Koshanam village is the largest population in nambiyur. Has many small scale garment knitting units, Largest Areca Palm Leaf Plate manufacturer and exporter Ecopath Inc located in this village, Koshanam has a population of about 7397.
