= Gobichettipalayam taluk =

Gobichettipalayam taluk is a taluk of Erode district of the Indian state of Tamil Nadu. The headquarters of the taluk is the town of Gobichettipalayam. Recently, this taluk together with Sathyamangalam Taluk was reorganised to form Nambiyur Taluk.

== Demographics ==
According to the 2011 census, the taluk of Gobichettipalayam had a population of 376,209 with 186,702 males and 189,507 females. There were 1015 women for every 1000 men. The taluk had a literacy rate of 64.97. Child population in the age group below 6 was 13,736 Males and 13,469 Females.

== Constituents ==
Gobichettipalayam taluk consists of one municipality, nine panchayat towns and 55 panchayat villages. The following are the constituents:

=== Municipality ===
- Gobichettipalayam

=== Panchayat towns ===
- Nambiyur
- Periya Kodiveri
- Vaniputhur
- Kuhalur
- Lakkampatti
- Kolappalur
- P.Mettupalayam
- Kasipalayam
- Elathur

=== Panchayat villages ===
- Akkarai Kodiveri
- Alukuli
- Ammapalayam
- Andipalayam
- Anjanur
- Arrakkankottaigramam
- Avalampalayam
- Ayalur
- Chandrapuram
- Emmampoondi
- Gudakkarai
- Irugalur
- K Mettuppalayam
- Kadasellipalayam
- Kadathur
- Kadukkampalayam
- Kalingiyam
- Kanakampalayam
- Karattupalayam
- Kavandampalayam
- Kondayampalayam
- Kongarpalayam
- Koshanam
- Kottupullampalayam
- Kugalur
- Kullampalayam
- Kurumandur
- Lagampalayam
- Mevani
- Modachur
- Mottanam
- Nagadevampalayam
- Nanjai Gobi
- Nanjai Puliampatti
- Nathipalayam
- Nichampalayam
- Odayagoundanpalayam
- Olalakovil
- Pariyur
- Perumugai
- Perundalaiyur
- Polavapalayam
- Polavakalipalayam
- Pullappanaickenpalayam
- Punjaithuraipalayam
- Puthukkarai
- Santhipalayam
- Savandapur
- Singiripalayam
- Sinnaripalayam
- Siruvalur
- Sundakkampalayam
- Talguni
- Vellalapalayam
- Vellankoil
- Vemandampalayam
