= Emmampoondi =

Panchayat village in India

- Panchayat village
- Location in Tamil Nadu, India Emmampoondi (India)
- Coordinates: 11°22′23″N 77°19′15″E
- Country: India
- State: Tamil Nadu
- Region: Coimbatore (Kongu Nadu)
- District: Erode
- Taluk: Gobichettipalayam

Languages
  - Official: Tamil
- Time zone: UTC+5:30 (IST)
- PIN: 638458
- Telephone code: 91(04285)
- Vehicle registration: TN 36

Emmampoondi is a panchayat village in Gobichettipalayam taluk in Erode District of Tamil Nadu state, India. It is about 28 km from Gobichettipalayam and 63 km from district headquarters Erode. The village is located on the road connecting Gobichettipalayam with Nambiyur. Emmampoondi has a population of about 6366.
