= Kalingiyam =

Panchayat village in India

- Panchayat village
- Location in Tamil Nadu, India Kalingiyam (India)
- Coordinates: 11°24′47″N 77°21′38″E
- Country: India
- State: Tamil Nadu
- Region: Coimbatore (Kongu Nadu)
- District: Erode
- Taluk: Gobichettipalayam

Languages
  - Official: Tamil
- Time zone: UTC+5:30 (IST)
- PIN: 638453
- Telephone code: 91(04285)
- Vehicle registration: TN 36

Kalingiyam is a panchayat village in Gobichettipalayam taluk in Erode District of Tamil Nadu state, India. It is about 5 km from Gobichettipalayam and 40 km from district headquarters Erode. The village is located on the road connecting Gobichettipalayam with Nambiyur. Kalingiyam has a population of about 9722. The village is with Koothandi Mariyamman Temple, Sakthi Mariyamman Temple, Kariakaliyamman Temple, Azhaguraya Perumal Temple and Mangalambigai (Aroobam) udanamar Naganathaswamy Temple and a mosque. Every year in the month of January, Kambam festival celebrated with Koothan Ilu function in Koothandi mariyamman temple and Kariakaliyamman Kundam festival in tamil month Panguni.Naganathaswamy temple is famous for Monthly pradhosams and Festivals like Tiruvathirai, Annabhisegam, Karthigai Deepam and Maha Sivarathri.
