= Pudukaraipudur =

Pudukkarai Pudur
- town panchayat
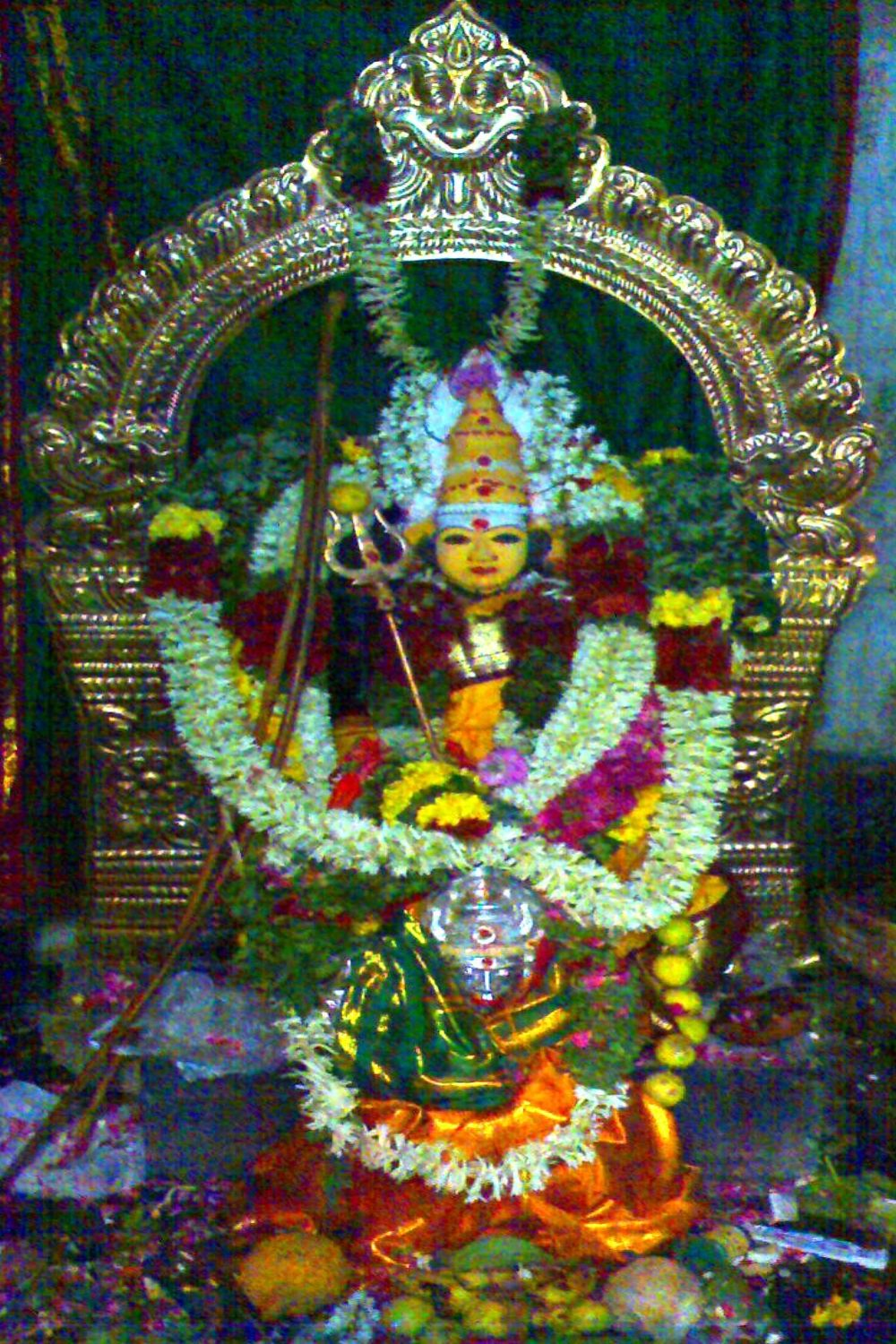
- Suyambu Maakaliamman

- Location in Tamil Nadu, India Pudukkarai Pudur (India)
- Coordinates: 11°29′06″N 77°28′47″E
- Country: India
- State: Tamil Nadu
- Region: Coimbatore (Kongu Nadu)
- District: Erode

Government
  - Member of Legislative Assembly: K. A. Sengottaiyan
  - Member of Parliament: C. Sivasamy

Population (2011)
  - Total: 1,473

Languages
  - Official: Tamil
- Time zone: UTC+5:30 (IST)
- Telephone code: 91(04285)
- Lok Sabha constituency: Tirupur
- Vidhan Sabha constituency: Gobichettipalayam

Pudukkaraipudur is a panchayat in Gobichettipalayam taluk in Erode District of Tamil Nadu state, India. It is about 5 km from Gobichettipalayam and 35 km from district headquarters Erode. The village is surrounded by beautiful paddy fields and canals. The village is located on the road connecting Gobichettipalayam with Anthiyur. Pudukkaraipudur has a population of about 1,473. The Pariyur Kondathu Kaliamman temple is about 2 km from Pudukkaraipudur. Other temples are Karungaradu Murugan Temple, Arulmigu Suyambu Makaliamman Temple, Shri Sangili Muniappan Temple and Arulmigu Vayal Karuppsamy Temple.The Bhavani River is around 2.5 km from the village. Paddy, turmeric, sugar cane, banana, palm and coconuts are cultivated in this region.
