= Kunderipallam Dam =

- Location within India
- Country: India
- Location: Erode district, Tamil Nadu, India
- Coordinates: 11°33′5″N 77°22′0″E
- Purpose: Irrigation
- Status: Operational
- Construction began: 1975
- Opening date: 1980

Kunderipallam Dam is a dam located in Kongarpalayam, Gobichettipalayam Taluk, Erode district, Tamil Nadu, India. Located in the southern part of a dense hill forest, it is a crucial structure for Tamil Nadu's agricultural and hydroelectric power sectors. In addition, it is valuable as a destination for international tourism due to the wide variety of both rare fish and fowl that call it home.

== History ==
Built across the Bhavani River, the dam's construction began in 1975 and was completed in 1980. With a height of 42 feet and a length of 2,174 meters, the dam has a reservoir capacity of 49.2 million cubic meters (1.72 Tmcft) and covers an area of approximately 2,500 hectares. Rainfall in the area can reach up to 1200 mm per day (Dubious: Even Cherrapunji or officially known as Sohra in the Indian state of Meghalaya does not get 1200 mm of rain in a single day)

The dam is built across wild streams at the confluence of Kadambur Hill and an adjacent hill. It is a small dam, supporting agriculture on roughly 3000 acres (~1214 hectares), mostly by increasing the ground water level rather than direct canal irrigation. Steep hills with dense jungle take off on both the right and left (East and West) sides of the dam, where wild varieties of flora and fauna are seen.

== Irrigation and Agriculture ==
Kunderipallam Dam is primarily used for irrigation purposes and provides water to over 2,500 hectares of farmland in the Erode and Tirupur districts. The dam also has a capacity of 5 MW and is used for hydroelectric power generation. [references don't refer to this]
