= Kadathur, Erode =

Panchayat village in India

Kadathur
- Panchayat village
- Location in Tamil Nadu, India Kadathur (India)
- Coordinates: 11°25′9″N 77°17′4″E
- Country: India
- State: Tamil Nadu
- Region: Coimbatore (Kongu Nadu)
- District: Erode
- Taluk: Gobichettipalayam

Languages
  - Official: Tamil
- Time zone: UTC+5:30 (IST)
- PIN: 638454
- Telephone code: 91(04285)
- Vehicle registration: TN 36

Kadathur is a panchayat village in Gobichettipalayam taluk in Erode District of Tamil Nadu state, India. It is about 23 km from Gobichettipalayam and 58 km from district headquarters Erode. The village is located on the road connecting Gobichettipalayam with Kurumandur. Kadathur has a population of about 4171.
