= K Mettuppalayam =

Village in Tamil Nadu, India

K.Mettupalayam is a village located in the Gobichettipalayam Taluk of Erode district of India's Tamilnadu state, situated in the way of Erode-Sathyamangalam main road.

The village is situated on the bank of a canal in Kalichettipalayam, which is why it is called Kalichettipalayam Mettuppalayam (K. Mettuppalayam).

K.Mettupalayam is fully surrounded by fertile land. The backbone of this village is mainly agriculture and handloom weaving.

== People ==
The people are mostly farmers and handloom weavers.

== Education ==
Panchayat Union High School gives basic education.

== School ==
Panchayat Union High School

== College ==
Shree Venkateswara Hitech Engineering College, Shree Venkateswara Hitech Polytechnic College and Shree Venkateshwara College of Arts and Science,

== Library ==
The library is established in the village to enhance the knowledge and current affairs of the people and young students.

== Temple ==
Raja Ganapathy Temple, Arulmigu Kamatchi Amman Temple, Mari Amman Temple, Komalikarai Sellandi Amman Temple, Komalikarai Vinayakar Temple and Komalikarai Perumal Temple, Sai Baba Temple, Swamy Ayyappan Temple

== Market ==
The weekly Market has 100 shops nearly every Thursday. In this market-fresh Fruits, Vegetables are brought directly from agricultural land and sold to villagers.

== Business ==
Vegetables& Hand Loom Weaving Handloom and Power Loom Textiles

== Culture ==
Saree, Half Saree, Churidhar for Women and Shirt and Dhoti for Men......

== Food ==
Rice, Idly, Dosa

== Agriculture ==
The following crops are produced in this village 1. Rice 2. Sugarcane 3. Banana 4. Turmeric 5. Vegetables 6. Sericulture
