= Chandrapuram =

Panchayat village in India

- Panchayat village
- Location in Tamil Nadu, India Chandrapuram (India)
- Coordinates: 11°26′3″N 77°30′49″E
- Country: India
- State: Tamil Nadu
- Region: Coimbatore (Kongu Nadu)
- District: Erode
- Taluk: Gobichettipalayam

Languages
  - Official: Tamil
- Time zone: UTC+5:30 (IST)
- Telephone code: 91(04285)
- Vehicle registration: TN 36

Chandrapuram is a panchayat village in Gobichettipalayam taluk in Erode District of Tamil Nadu state, India. It is about 10 km from Gobichettipalayam and 25 km from district headquarters Erode. The village is located on the road connecting Gobichettipalayam with Erode. Chandrapuram has a population of about 1597.
