= Lakkampatti =

- Panchayat Town
- Location in Tamil Nadu, India
- Coordinates: 11°27′42″N 77°22′44″E
- Country: India
- State: Tamil Nadu
- District: Erode

Area
  - Total: 13.5 km^{2} (5.2 sq mi)

Population (2011)
  - Total: 11,716
  - Density: 868/km^{2} (2,250/sq mi)

Languages
  - Official: Tamil
- Time zone: UTC+5:30 (IST)

Lakkampatti is a panchayat town in Gobichettipalayam taluk of Erode district in the Indian state of Tamil Nadu. It is located in the north-western part of the state. Spread across an area of 13.5 km^{2} (5.2 sq mi), it had a population of 11,716 individuals as per the 2011 census.

== Geography and administration ==
Lakkampatti is located in Gobichettipalayam taluk, Gobichettipalayam division of Erode district in the Indian state of Tamil Nadu. Spread across an area of 13.5 km^{2} (5.2 sq mi), it is one of the 42 panchayat towns in the district. It is located in the north-western part of the state towards the southern end of the Indian peninsula.

The town panchayat is headed by a chairperson, who is elected by the members, who are chosen through direct elections. In 2025, it was proposed to be merged to the Gobichettipalayam Municipality. The town forms part of the Gobichettipalayam Assembly constituency that elects its member to the Tamil Nadu legislative assembly and the Tiruppur Lok Sabha constituency that elects its member to the Parliament of India.

== Demographics ==
As per the 2011 census, Lakkampatti had a population of 11,716 individuals across 3,454 households. The population saw a marginal increase compared to the previous census in 2001 when 11,039 inhabitants were registered. The population consisted of 5,850 males and 5,866 females. About 923 individuals were below the age of six years. The entire population is classified as urban. The town has an average literacy rate of 75.9%. About 12.7% of the population belonged to scheduled castes.

About 49.8% of the eligible population were employed. Hinduism was the majority religion which was followed by 96.5% of the population, with Islam (2.5%) and Christianity (0.7%) being minor religions.
