= Lagampalayam =

Panchayat village in India

- Panchayat village
- Location in Tamil Nadu, India Lagampalayam (India)
- Coordinates: 11°20′18″N 77°14′13″E
- Country: India
- State: Tamil Nadu
- Region: Coimbatore (Kongu Nadu)
- District: Erode
- Taluk: Gobichettipalayam

Languages
  - Official: Tamil
- Time zone: UTC+5:30 (IST)
- PIN: 638462
- Telephone code: 91(04285)
- Vehicle registration: TN 36

Lagampalayam is a panchayat village in Gobichettipalayam taluk in Erode District of Tamil Nadu state, India. It is about 32 km from Gobichettipalayam and 67 km from district headquarters Erode. It had a population of about 1910 as of 2016.
