= Nichampalayam =

Panchayat village in India

- Panchayat village
- Location in Tamil Nadu, India Nichampalayam (India)
- Coordinates: 11°19′56″N 77°30′34″E
- Country: India
- State: Tamil Nadu
- Region: Coimbatore (Kongu Nadu)
- District: Erode
- Taluk: Gobichettipalayam

Languages
  - Official: Tamil
- Time zone: UTC+5:30 (IST)
- Telephone code: 91(04285)
- Vehicle registration: TN 36

Nichampalayam is a panchayat village in Perundurai taluk in Erode District of Tamil Nadu state, India. It is about 25 km from Perundurai and 30 km from district headquarters Erode. The village is located on the road connecting Gobichettipalayam with Perundurai. Nichampalayam has a population of about 1529.
