= Perundalaiyur =

Panchayat village in India

- Panchayat village
- Location in Tamil Nadu, India Perundalaiyur (India)
- Coordinates: 11°27′39″N 77°33′51″E
- Country: India
- State: Tamil Nadu
- Region: Coimbatore (Kongu Nadu)
- District: Erode
- Taluk: Gobichettipalayam

Languages
  - Official: Tamil
- Time zone: UTC+5:30 (IST)
- Telephone code: 91(04285)
- Vehicle registration: TN 36

Perundalaiyur is a panchayat village in Gobichettipalayam taluk in Erode District of Tamil Nadu state, India. It is about 17 km from Gobichettipalayam and 27 km from district headquarters Erode. The village is located on the road connecting Gobichettipalayam with Bhavani. Perundalaiyur has a population of about 3410.

== Gallery ==
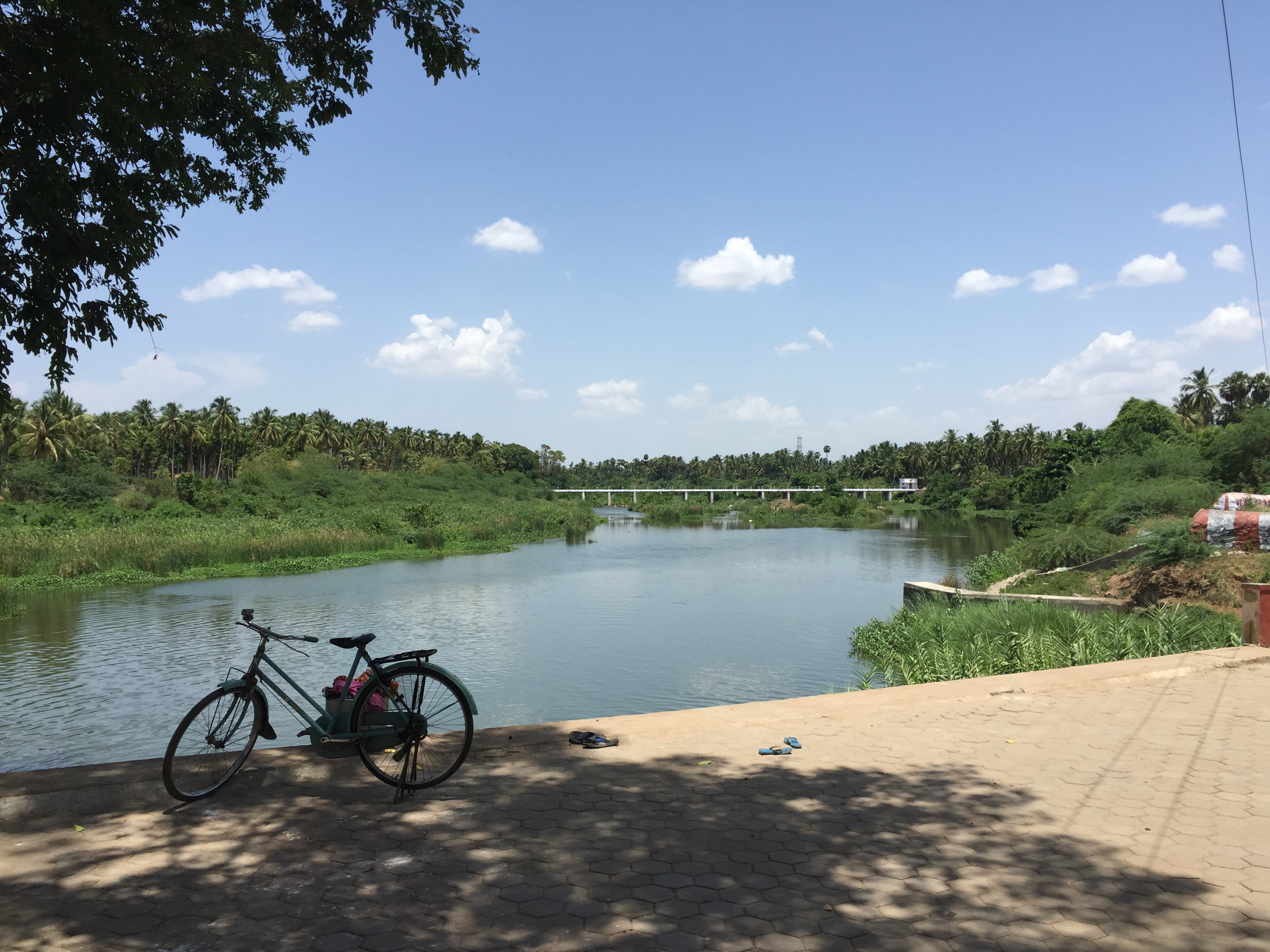
This spot by the river is used by locals for recreation and daily necessities like laundry and bathing.

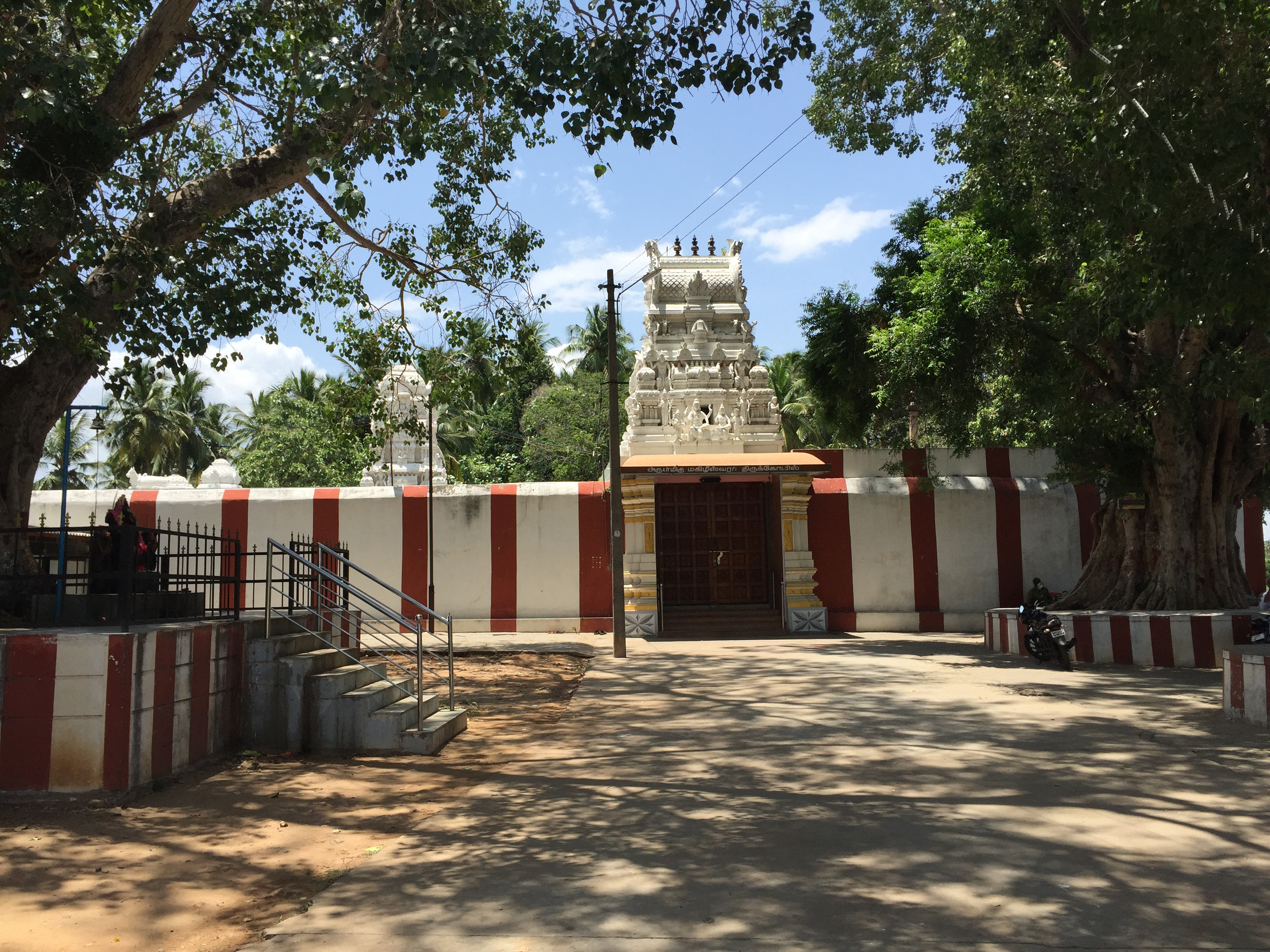
This temple is estimated to be over 50 years old.

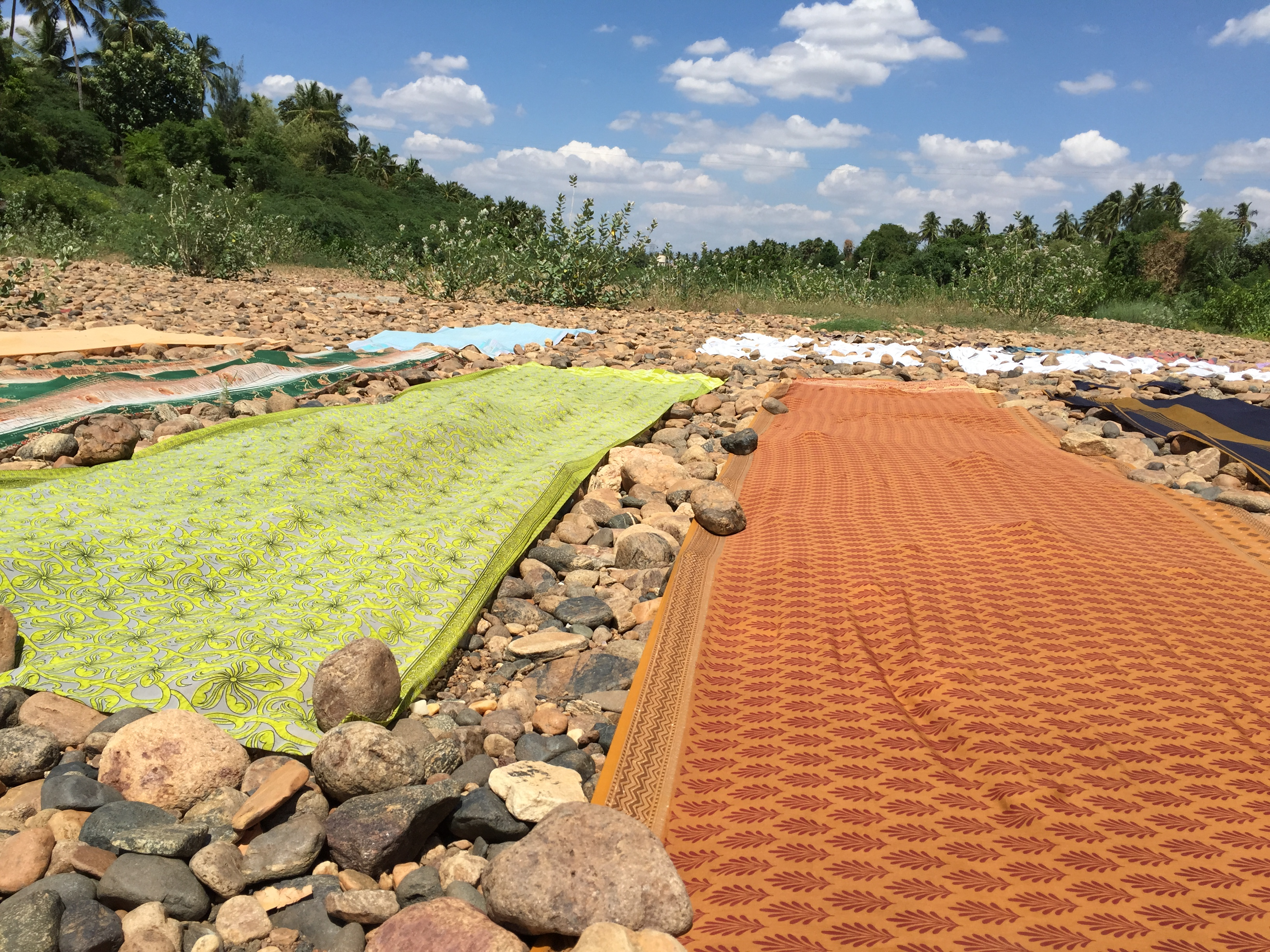
Unlike earlier when locals flocked in droves to the river to do their laundry, the river to this day is used by some for laundry
