= Kadathur (disambiguation) =

Kadathur is a town in Dharmapuri district, Tamil Nadu, India.

Kadathur may also refer to:

- Kadathur, Erode, a village in Erode district, Tamil Nadu, India
- Kadathur, Kallakurichi, a village in the Chinnasalem block in Kallakurichi district, Tamil Nadu, India
- Kadathur, Tiruppur, a village in Tiruppur district, Tamil Nadu, India
