= Polavakalipalayam =

Panchayat village in India

- Panchayat village
- Location in Tamil Nadu, India Polavakalipalayam (India)
- Coordinates: 11°27′1″N 77°28′48″E
- Country: India
- State: Tamil Nadu
- Region: Coimbatore (Kongu Nadu)
- District: Erode
- Taluk: Gobichettipalayam

Languages
  - Official: Tamil
- Time zone: UTC+5:30 (IST)
- PIN: 638476
- Telephone code: 91(04285)
- Vehicle registration: TN 36

Pulavakalipalayam is a panchayat village in Gobichettipalayam taluk in Erode District of Tamil Nadu state, India. The village is located on the road connecting Gobichettipalayam (about 5 km away) and the district headquarters, Erode (30 km). Pulavakalipalayam has a population of about 4,442. It comes under anthiyur assembly constituency and Tiruppur parliamentary constituency.
