= Olalakovil =

Panchayat village in India

- Panchayat village
- Location in Tamil Nadu, India Olalakovil (India)
- Coordinates: 11°16′43″N 77°19′35″E
- Country: India
- State: Tamil Nadu
- Region: Coimbatore (Kongu Nadu)
- District: Erode
- Taluk: Gobichettipalayam

Languages
  - Official: Tamil
- Time zone: UTC+5:30 (IST)
- Telephone code: 91(04285)
- Vehicle registration: TN 36

Olalakovil is a panchayat village in the Gobichettipalayam taluk, in Erode District of Tamil Nadu state, India. It is about 33 km from Gobichettipalayam and 70 km from the district headquarters, Erode. Olalakovil is located on the road connecting Gobichettipalayam with Avinashi. Olalakovil has a population of about 8,805.

The Sri Uthayagiri Muthuvelayudha Swamy Temple is located in Malayapalayam, a village of Olalakovil. Thaipoosam and Mahadharisanam is well celebrated during January month or Tamil month thai.

Malayappalayam is major village olalakovil Panchayat, it alone had population above 4000.Every Tuesday market is opened.

Transport:

Nambiyur - Palagarai ODR passing through this town. Well connected by bus nearby places like Tiruppur (every 20mins), Nambiyur Every 20 mins, Avinasi Every 40 mins, Kunnathur, Sathyamangalam, Erode, Puliyambatti bus also available on timings.

Olalakovil consists of the following villages:

1. A.Nallakattipalayam

2. Thailampalayam

3. China Chettiyapalayam

4. Periya Chettiyapalayam

5. Malayapalayam

6. Komarapalayam

7. Karichipalayam

8. Muthugoundampalayam

9. Chellandampalayam

10. Malayapalayam puthur
