= Modachur =

Panchayat village in India

- Panchayat village and suburb
- Location in Tamil Nadu, India Modachur (India)
- Coordinates: 11°25′55″N 77°26′7″E
- Country: India
- State: Tamil Nadu
- Region: Coimbatore (Kongu Nadu)
- District: Erode
- Taluk: Gobichettipalayam

Languages
  - Official: Tamil
- Time zone: UTC+5:30 (IST)
- PIN: 638452
- Telephone code: 91(04285)
- Vehicle registration: TN 36

Modachur is a panchayat village in Gobichettipalayam taluk in Erode District of Tamil Nadu state, India. It is a suburb of Gobichettipalayam and 36 km from district headquarters Erode. It is located on the southern side of the town of Gobichettipalayam along the SH 81. Modachur has a population of about 6481.
