= Arrakkankottai =

Panchayat village in India

Arakkankottai
- Panchayat village
- Location in Tamil Nadu, India Arakkankottai (India)
- Coordinates: 11°29′53″N 77°20′55″E
- Country: India
- State: Tamil Nadu
- Region: Coimbatore (Kongu Nadu)
- District: Erode
- Taluk: Gobichettipalayam

Languages
  - Official: Tamil
- Time zone: UTC+5:30 (IST)
- Telephone code: 91(04285)
- Vehicle registration: TN 36

Arakkankottai is a panchayat village in Gobichettipalayam taluk in Erode District of Tamil Nadu state, India. It is about 17 km from Gobichettipalayam and 52 km from district headquarters Erode. The village is located on the road connecting Gobichettipalayam with Sathyamangalam. Arakkankottai has a population of about 3690.
