= Vellalapalayam =

Panchayat village in India

- Panchayat village
- Location in Tamil Nadu, India Vellalapalayam (India)
- Coordinates: 11°27′46″N 77°28′2″E
- Country: India
- State: Tamil Nadu
- Region: Kongu Nadu
- District: Erode
- Taluk: Gobichettipalayam

Languages
  - Official: Tamil
- Time zone: UTC+5:30 (IST)
- PIN: 638476
- Telephone code: 91(04285)
- Vehicle registration: TN 36

Vellalapalayam is a panchayat village in Gobichettipalayam taluk in Erode District of Tamil Nadu state, India. It is about 5 km from Gobichettipalayam and 40 km from district headquarters Erode. Vellalapalayam is situated in the vicinity of the Pariyur Kondathu Kaliamman and Pavalamalai Muthukumara Swamy Temples. In 2011, the village had a population of about 4,958 inhabitants.
