= Santhipalayam =

Panchayat village in India

- Panchayat village
- Location in Tamil Nadu, India Santhipalayam (India)
- Coordinates: 11°20′27″N 77°24′52″E
- Country: India
- State: Tamil Nadu
- Region: Coimbatore (Kongu Nadu)
- District: Erode
- Taluk: Gobichettipalayam

Languages
  - Official: Tamil
- Time zone: UTC+5:30 (IST)
- Telephone code: 91(04285)
- Vehicle registration: TN 36

Santhipalayam is a panchayat village in Gobichettipalayam taluk in Erode District of Tamil Nadu state, India. It is about 14 km from Gobichettipalayam and 50 km from district headquarters Erode. The village is located on the road connecting Gobichettipalayam with Kunnathur. Santhipalayam has a population of about 3721.
