= Nathipalayam =

Panchayat village in India

- Panchayat village
- Location in Tamil Nadu, India Nathipalayam (India)
- Coordinates: 11°25′49″N 77°27′10″E
- Country: India
- State: Tamil Nadu
- Region: Coimbatore (Kongu Nadu)
- District: Erode
- Taluk: Gobichettipalayam

Languages
  - Official: Tamil
- Time zone: UTC+5:30 (IST)
- PIN: 638476
- Telephone code: 91(04285)
- Vehicle registration: TN 36

Nathipalayam is a panchayat village in Gobichettipalayam taluk in Erode District of Tamil Nadu state, India. It is about 5 km from Gobichettipalayam and 37 km from district headquarters Erode. The village is located on the road connecting Gobichettipalayam with Perundurai. Nathipalayam has a population of about 1330.
