= Polavapalayam =

Panchayat village in India

- Panchayat village
- Location in Tamil Nadu, India Polavapalayam (India)
- Coordinates: 11°20′54″N 77°17′55″E
- Country: India
- State: Tamil Nadu
- Region: Coimbatore (Kongu Nadu)
- District: Erode
- Taluk: Gobichettipalayam

Languages
  - Official: Tamil
- Time zone: UTC+5:30 (IST)
- PIN: 638458
- Telephone code: 91(04285)
- Vehicle registration: TN 36

Polavapalayam is a panchayat village in Nambiyur taluk in Erode District of Tamil Nadu state, India. It is about 25 km from Gobichettipalayam and 60 km from district headquarters Erode. The village is located on the road connecting Gobichettipalayam with Avinashi. Polavapalayam has a population of about 1789.
