= Mottanam =

Panchayat village in India

- Panchayat village
- Location in Tamil Nadu, India Mottanam (India)
- Coordinates: 11°19′46″N 77°17′47″E
- Country: India
- State: Tamil Nadu
- Region: Coimbatore (Kongu Nadu)
- District: Erode
- Taluk: Gobichettipalayam

Languages
  - Official: Tamil
- Time zone: UTC+5:30 (IST)
- Telephone code: 91(04285)
- Vehicle registration: TN 36

Mottanam is a panchayat village in Gobichettipalayam taluk in Erode District of Tamil Nadu state, India. It is about 26 km from Gobichettipalayam and 62 km from district headquarters Erode. The village is located on the road connecting Gobichettipalayam with Avinashi. Mottanam has a population of about 987.
