= Alukuli =

Panchayat village in India

- Panchayat village
- Location in Tamil Nadu, India Alukuli (India)
- Coordinates: 11°26′51″N 77°21′30″E
- Country: India
- State: Tamil Nadu
- Region: Coimbatore (Kongu Nadu)
- District: Erode
- Taluk: Gobichettipalayam

Languages
  - Official: Tamil
- Time zone: UTC+5:30 (IST)
- PIN: 638453
- Telephone code: 91(04285)
- Vehicle registration: TN 36

Alukuli is a panchayat village in Gobichettipalayam taluk in Erode District of Tamil Nadu state, India. It is about 9 km from Gobichettipalayam and 45 km from district headquarters Erode. The village is located on the road connecting Gobichettipalayam with Coimbatore. Alukuli has a population of about 6974.
