= Perumpallam Dam =

Dam in Tamil Nadu, India

- Location within Tamil Nadu Location within India
- Country: India
- Coordinates: 11°33′43″N 77°18′16″E

Dam and spillways
- Impounds: Perumpallam River, also known as Kousika River
- Length: 2060 m

Perumpallam Dam is a dam in Sathyamangalam, Erode district, Tamil Nadu, southeastern India. It is fed by rainwater from the Kadambur Hills and the Bhavani River. It was built in the 1980s. It measures roughly 2 km long and 40 metres in height and occupies 65.29 hectares of land. The reservoir which the dam inundates is subject to dramatic changes in water levels, from drought to heavy flooding such as in November 2006.
