= Siruvalur =

Siruvalur may refer to:

- Siruvalur (Ariyalur), a village in Ariyalur district, Tamil Nadu, India
- Siruvalur (Gobi), a village in Erode District, Tamil Nadu, India
