= Anjanur =

Panchayat village in India

- Panchayat village
- Location in Tamil Nadu, India Anjanur (India)
- Coordinates: 11°20′45″N 77°16′20″E
- Country: India
- State: Tamil Nadu
- Region: Coimbatore (Kongu Nadu)
- District: Erode
- Taluk: Gobichettipalayam

Languages
  - Official: Tamil
- Time zone: UTC+5:30 (IST)
- Telephone code: 91(04285)
- Vehicle registration: TN 36

Anjanur is a panchayat village in Gobichettipalayam taluk in Erode District of Tamil Nadu state, India. It is about 27 km from Gobichettipalayam and 60 km from district headquarters Erode. The village is located on the road connecting Gobichettipalayam with Punjai Puliampatti. Anjanur has a population of about 4302.
