= Kullampalayam =

Panchayat village in India

- Panchayat village
- Location in Tamil Nadu, India Kullampalayam (India)
- Coordinates: 11°26′49″N 77°27′35″E
- Country: India
- State: Tamil Nadu
- Region: Coimbatore (Kongu Nadu)
- District: Erode
- Taluk: Gobichettipalayam

Languages
  - Official: Tamil
- Time zone: UTC+5:30 (IST)
- PIN: 638476
- Telephone code: 91(04285)
- Vehicle registration: TN 36

Kullampalayam is a panchayat village in Gobichettipalayam taluk in Erode District of Tamil Nadu state, India. It is about 1.2 km from Gobichettipalayam and 34 km from District Capital Erode. The village is located on the road connecting Gobichettipalayam with Erode. Kullampalayam has a population of about 2790.
