= Kuhalur =

Kuhalur Kugalur
- Panchayat town
- Location in Tamil Nadu, India
- Coordinates: 11°29′38″N 77°30′17″E
- Country: India
- State: Tamil Nadu
- District: Erode

Area
  - Total: 20.72 km^{2} (8.00 sq mi)

Population (2011)
  - Total: 11,753
  - Density: 567.2/km^{2} (1,469/sq mi)

Languages
  - Official: Tamil
- Time zone: UTC+5:30 (IST)
- Postal code: 638 313

Kuhalur or Kugalur is a panchayat town in Gobichettipalayam taluk of Erode district in the Indian state of Tamil Nadu. It is located in the north-western part of the state. Spread across an area of 20.72 km^{2} (8.00 sq mi), it had a population of 11,753 individuals as per the 2011 census.

== Geography and administration ==
Kuhalur is located in Gobichettipalayam taluk, Gobichettipalayam division of Erode district in the Indian state of Tamil Nadu. Spread across an area of 20.72 km^{2} (8.00 sq mi), it is one of the 42 panchayat towns in the district. It is located in the north-western part of the state towards the southern end of the Indian peninsula.

The town panchayat is headed by a chairperson, who is elected by the members, who are chosen through direct elections. The town forms part of the Gobichettipalayam Assembly constituency that elects its member to the Tamil Nadu legislative assembly and the Tiruppur Lok Sabha constituency that elects its member to the Parliament of India.

== Demographics ==
As per the 2011 census, Kuhalur had a population of 11,753 individuals across 3,628 households. The population saw a marginal increase compared to the previous census in 2001 when 11,684 inhabitants were registered. The population consisted of 5,765 males and 5,988 females. About 964 individuals were below the age of six years. The entire population is classified as urban. The town has an average literacy rate of 63.6%. About 18.4% of the population belonged to scheduled castes.

About 59.3% of the eligible population were employed. Agriculture is the major contributor to the economy, with a larger proportion of workforce engaged in allied activities. Hinduism was the majority religion which was followed by 98.9% of the population, with Islam (0.9%) and Christianity (0.3%) being minor religions.
