= Kurumandur =

Panchayat village in India

- Panchayat village
- Location in Tamil Nadu, India Kurumandur (India)
- Coordinates: 11°25′19″N 77°21′16″E
- Country: India
- State: Tamil Nadu
- Region: Coimbatore (Kongu Nadu)
- District: Erode
- Taluk: Gobichettipalayam

Languages
  - Official: Tamil
- Time zone: UTC+5:30 (IST)
- PIN: 638457
- Telephone code: 91(04285)
- Vehicle registration: TN 36

Kurumandur is a panchayat village in Gobichettipalayam taluk in Erode District of Tamil Nadu state, India. It is about 11 km from Gobichettipalayam and 47 km from district headquarters Erode. The village is located on the road connecting Gobichettipalayam with Coimbatore. Kurumandur has a population of about 4190.

Kurumandur Panchayat covers five neighbouring villages - Naduppalayam, Molapalayam, Kurumandur, Moonmpalli & Aayepalayam.

Temples Around: - 1. Poongulali Amman Temple 2. Aayepalayam Amman Temple 3. Easwaran Temple and a lot more.

== Palanigoundenpalayam ==
It is a small village famous for agriculture and also many rice mills are here

Indian petrol bunk also placed near in this village(24/7 hrs/days)

Majority of peoples in castewise like konguvellalargounder
