= Kasipalayam-Gobi =

Kasipalayam
- Panchayat Town
- Location in Tamil Nadu, India
- Coordinates: 11°28′25″N 77°23′19″E
- Country: India
- State: Tamil Nadu
- District: Erode

Area
  - Total: 8.48 km^{2} (3.27 sq mi)

Population (2011)
  - Total: 9,093
  - Density: 1,070/km^{2} (2,780/sq mi)

Languages
  - Official: Tamil
- Time zone: UTC+5:30 (IST)

Kasipalayam is a panchayat town in Gobichettipalayam taluk of Erode district in the Indian state of Tamil Nadu. It is located in the north-western part of the state. Spread across an area of 8.48 km^{2} (3.27 sq mi), it had a population of 9,093 individuals as per the 2011 census.

== Geography and administration ==
Kasipalayam is located in Gobichettipalayam taluk, Gobichettipalayam division of Erode district in the Indian state of Tamil Nadu. Spread across an area of 8.48 km^{2} (3.27 sq mi), it is one of the 42 panchayat towns in the district. It is located in the north-western part of the state towards the southern end of the Indian peninsula.

The town panchayat is headed by a chairperson, who is elected by the members, who are chosen through direct elections. The town forms part of the Gobichettipalayam Assembly constituency that elects its member to the Tamil Nadu legislative assembly and the Tiruppur Lok Sabha constituency that elects its member to the Parliament of India.

== Demographics ==
As per the 2011 census, Kasipalayam had a population of 9,093 individuals across 2,838 households. The population saw a marginal increase compared to the previous census in 2001 when 8,570 inhabitants were registered. The population consisted of 4,498 males and 4,595 females. About 764 individuals were below the age of six years. The entire population is classified as urban. The town has an average literacy rate of 67.4%. About 17.9% of the population belonged to scheduled castes.

About 57.3% of the eligible population were employed. Hinduism was the majority religion which was followed by 96.5% of the population, with Islam (2.5%) and Christianity (0.7%) being minor religions.
