= Siruvalur (Gobi) =

Panchayat village in India

- Panchayat village
- Location in Tamil Nadu, India Siruvalur (India)
- Coordinates: 11°21′58″N 77°27′38″E
- Country: India
- State: Tamil Nadu
- Region: Coimbatore (Kongu Nadu)
- District: Erode
- Taluk: Gobichettipalayam

Languages
  - Official: Tamil
- Time zone: UTC+5:30 (IST)
- PIN: 638054
- Telephone code: 91(04285)
- Vehicle registration: TN 36

Siruvalur is a panchayat village in Gobichettipalayam taluk in Erode District of Tamil Nadu, India. It is about 13 km from Gobichettipalayam and 48 km from district headquarters Erode. The village is located on the road connecting Gobichettipalayam with Perundurai. Siruvalur has a population of about 7493.
