= Akkarai Kodiveri =

Panchayat village in Tamil Nadu, India

- Panchayat village
- Location in Tamil Nadu, India Akkarai Kodiveri (India)
- Coordinates: 11°27′30″N 77°17′54″E
- Country: India
- State: Tamil Nadu
- Region: Coimbatore (Kongu Nadu)
- District: Erode
- Taluk: Gobichettipalayam

Languages
  - Official: Tamil
- Time zone: UTC+5:30 (IST)
- Telephone code: 91(04285)
- Vehicle registration: TN 36

Akkarai Kodiveri is a panchayat village in Gobichettipalayam taluk in Erode District of Tamil Nadu state, India. It is about 15 km from Gobichettipalayam and 50 km from district headquarters Erode.The village is located on the road connecting Gobichettipalayam with Sathyamangalam. Akkarai Kodiveri has a population of about 2263.
