= Kavandampalayam =

Panchayat village in India

- Panchayat village
- Country: India
- State: Tamil Nadu
- Region: Coimbatore (Kongu Nadu)
- District: Erode
- Taluk: Gobichettipalayam

Languages
  - Official: Tamil
- Time zone: UTC+5:30 (IST)
- Telephone code: 91(04285)
- Vehicle registration: TN 36

Kavandampalayam is a panchayat village in Gobichettipalayam taluk in Erode District of Tamil Nadu state, India. Kavandampalayam has a population of about 3103.
