= Satyamangalam block =

Satyamangalam block is a revenue block in the Erode district of Tamil Nadu, India. It has a total of 15 panchayat villages.

== Economy ==
In recent years Satyamangalam block, like Bhavanisagar block, has become a notable area of floriculture, with an increasing number of farmers turning to flower cultivation, with an increasing 10-15% of acreage dedicated to it annually according to 2010 reports. Of particular note is marigold cultivation which can earn Rs. 6 to Rs. 10 per kg during the season and are usually purchased by the traders in Sathyamangalam and Coimbatore to companies producing poultry feed and food colouring.
