= Sundakkampalayam =

- Panchayat village
- Location in Tamil Nadu, India Sundakkampalayam (India)
- Coordinates: 11°14′9″N 77°24′55″E
- Country: India
- State: Tamil Nadu
- Region: Coimbatore (Kongu Nadu)
- District: Tiruppur
- Taluk: Uthukuli

Languages
  - Official: Tamil
- Time zone: UTC+5:30 (IST)
- Telephone code: 91(04285)
- Vehicle registration: TN 36

Sundakkampalayam is a panchayat village in Uthukuli taluk in Tiruppur District of Tamil Nadu state, India. It is about 26 km from Gobichettipalayam and 44 km from Erode. The village is located on the State Highway 81 connecting Gobichettipalayam with Kangeyam. Sundakkampalayam has a population of about 4048.
