= Gobichettipalayam Municipality =

Coordinates: 11°27′13″N 77°26′18″E

Type
- Type: Municipality of the City of Gobichettipalayam

Leadership
- Chairman: N. R. Nagaraj, DMK
- Deputy Chairman: P. Deepa, INC

Meeting place
- Gobichettipalayam Municipal Building

Website
- municipality.tn.gov.in/gobi/

The Gobichettipalayam Municipality is the civic body that governs the town of Gobichettipalayam in Tamil Nadu, India.

== History ==
This municipality was constituted on 1 October 1949 as III grade as per G.O. Ms. No. 1948 (Local Administration Department) dated 12 August 1949 with effect from 1 October 1949 and was elevated to Grade II as per G.O. Ms. No. 194 (Local Administration Department) dated 10 February 1970 and to first Grade with effect from 1 October 1977 as per G.O. Ms. No. 1532 (R.D & L.A), 21 September 1977, and to Selection Grade as per G.O. Ms. No. 238 (MA&WS), 2 December 2008.

== Structure ==
This municipality consists of 30 wards and is headed by a Chairman who presides over a Deputy Chairman and 29 other councillors who represent the wards. The Chairman is elected directly through a first past the post voting system and the deputy mayor is elected by the Councillors from among their numbers. The Chairman post is reserved for women in accordance with the 33% reservation for women in local civil bodies.

== Chronological List of Chairmen ==
- M. Palanisamy Mudaliyar (1951)
- P. K. Nalla Gounder (1951-52)
- G. S. Lakshman Iyer (1952-55)
- P. K. Muthuvelappa Gounder (1955-69)
- P. N. Nanjappan (1969-76)
- G. S. Lakshman Iyer (1986-91)
- P. N. Nallasamy Gounder (1996-01)
- K. K. Kandavel Murugan (2001-06)
- M. Revathi Devi (2006-16)
- N. R. Nagaraj (2022-)
