= Athani, Erode =

Atthani
- Town panchayat
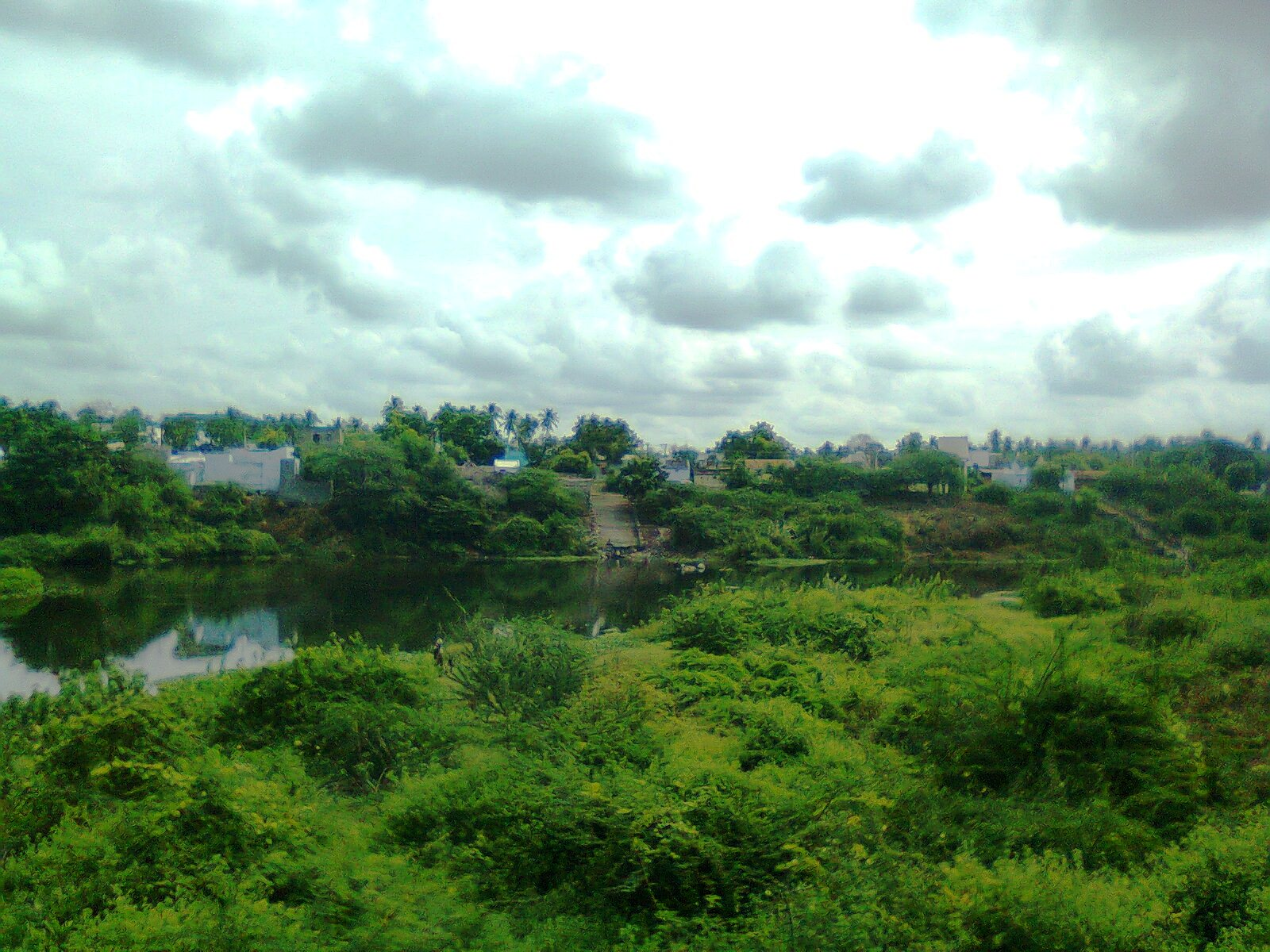
- Athani as seen from Savandapur with Bhavani River separating the regions

- Athani (Tamil Nadu) Atthani (India)
- Coordinates: 11°31′23″N 77°30′43″E
- Country: India
- State: Tamil Nadu
- District: Erode

Population (2011)
  - Total: 8,430
- Postal code: 638502
- Area code: 04256
- Vehicle registration: TN 36

Athani is a panchayat town in Anthiyur taluk of Erode district in the Indian state of Tamil Nadu. It is located in the north-western part of the state. Spread across an area of 8 km^{2} (3.1 sq mi), it had a population of 8,430 individuals as per the 2011 census.

== Geography and administration ==
Athani is located in Anthiyur taluk, Gobichettipalayam division of Erode district in the Indian state of Tamil Nadu. Spread across an area of 8 km^{2} (3.1 sq mi), it is one of the 42 panchayat towns in the district. It is located in the north-western part of the state towards the southern end of the Indian peninsula. It lies on the banks of the Bhavani River.

The town panchayat is headed by a chairperson, who is elected by the members, who are chosen through direct elections. The town forms part of the Anthiyur Assembly constituency that elects its member to the Tamil Nadu legislative assembly and the Tiruppur Lok Sabha constituency that elects its member to the Parliament of India.

== Demographics ==
As per the 2011 census, Athani had a population of 8,430 individuals, a marginal increase compared to the previous census in 2001, when 8,430 inhabitants were registered. The population consisted of 4,207 males and 4,423 females. About 666 individuals were below the age of six years. The entire population is classified as urban. Athani has an average literacy rate of 66.2%. About 23.6% of the population belonged to scheduled castes.

About 61.1% of the eligible population was employed. Nearly 73% of the population was employed in agriculture and allied activities. Hinduism was the majority religion which was followed by 99.2% of the population, with Christianity (0.7%) and Islam (0.1%) being minor religions.
