= Bhavani River =

River in India

Coordinates: 11°26′N 77°41′E

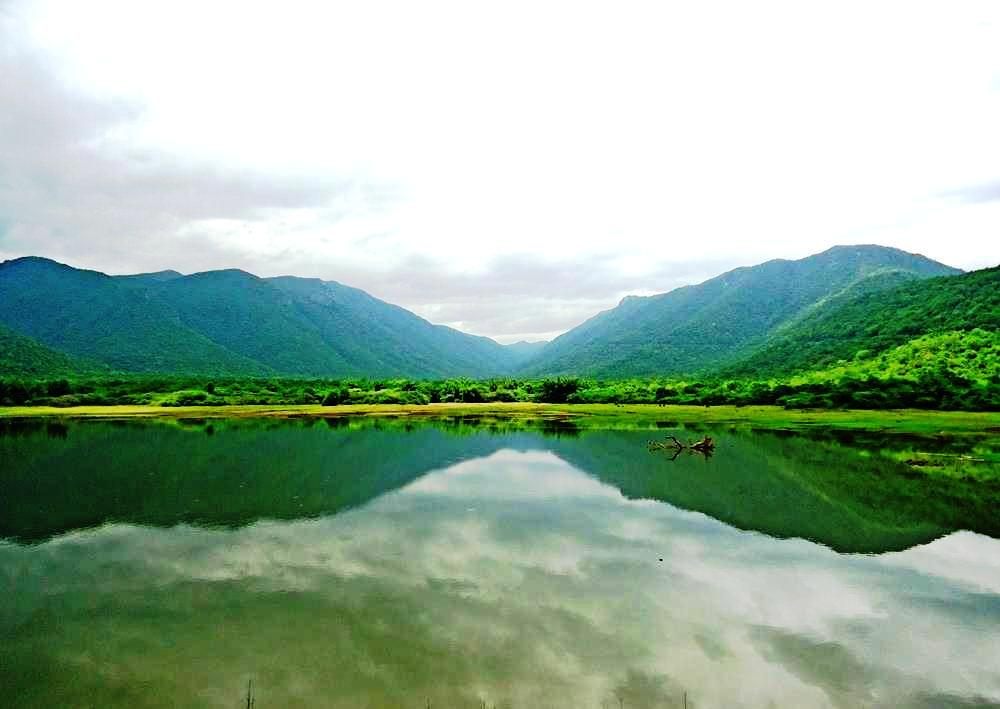
- Bhavani River

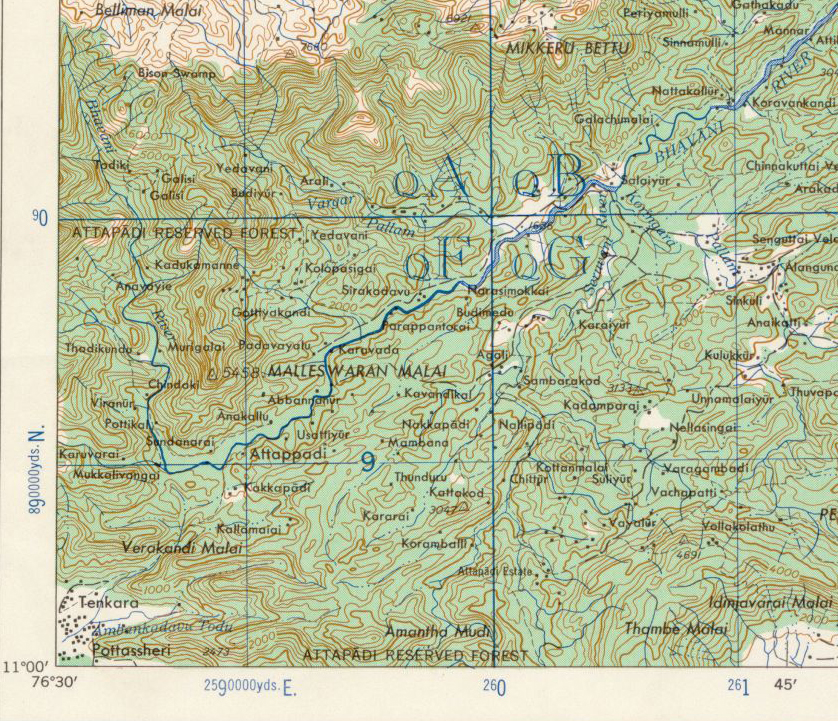
- Headwaters of the Bhavani River

Location
- Country: India
- States: Kerala; Tamil Nadu
- Districts: Palakkad; Nilgiris; Coimbatore; Erode
- Cities: Mettupalayam; Sathyamangalam; Gobichettipalayam; Bhavani

Physical characteristics
- Source
  - location: Western Ghats
- Mouth
  - location: Kaveri
- Length: 234 km (145 mi)

Bhavani is an Indian river which flows through the states of Kerala and Tamil Nadu. It originates in the Nilgiris in the Western Ghats in Tamil Nadu, and flows westwards into Kerala for some distance, before turning east, and flowing back towards Tamil Nadu. It stretches for 234 km (145 mi), and joins the Kaveri at Kooduthurai. The river basin covers an area of 1,410 km^{2} (540 sq mi) across three districts in Tamil Nadu. The major tributaries include the Moyar, and Siruvani Rivers. There are multiple dams across the river, including the Upper Bhavani, Bhavanisagar dam, and Kodiveri dam.

== Hydrography ==
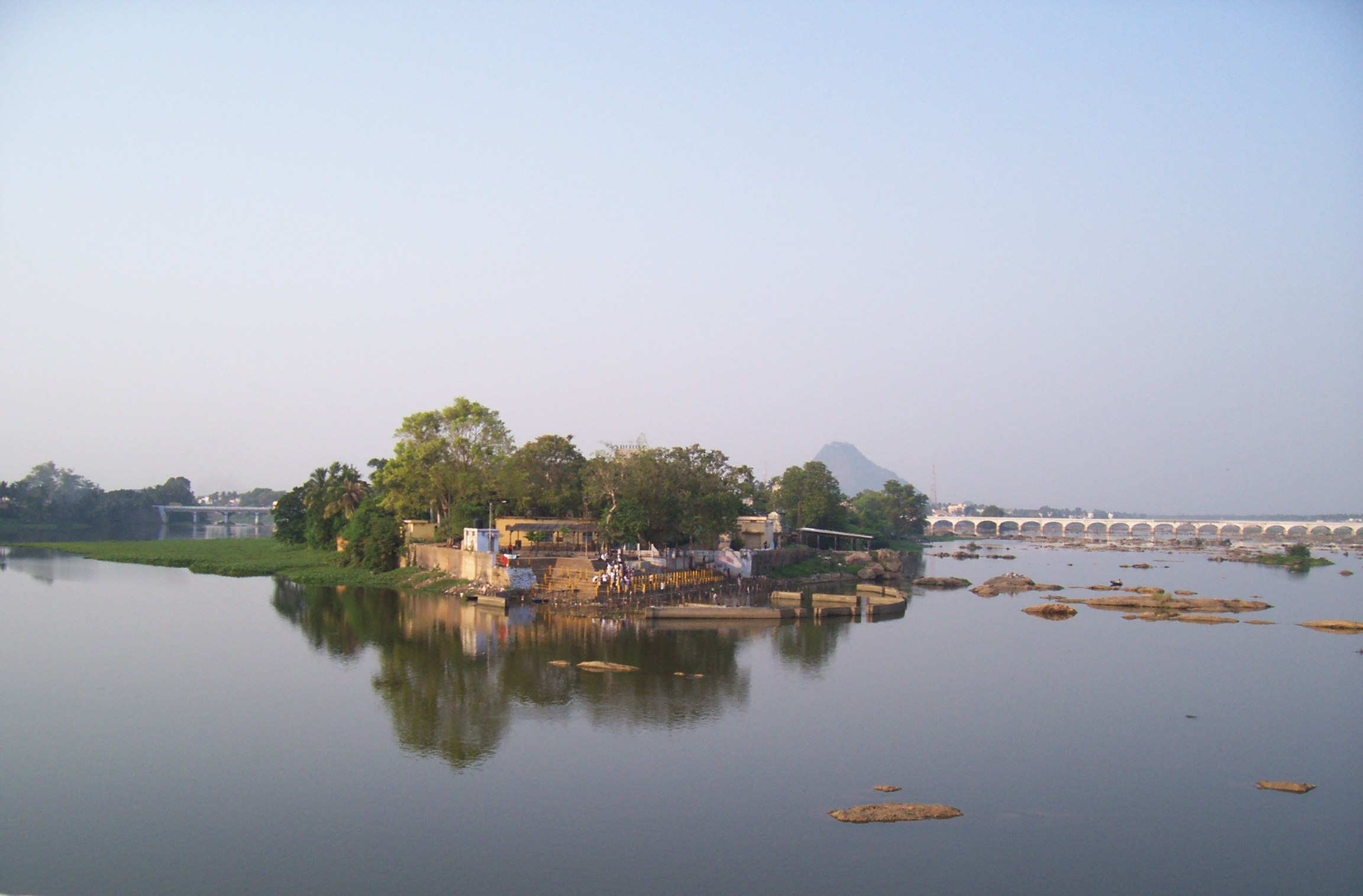
The confluence of the Bhavani and Kaveri rivers at Kooduthurai

The Bhavani is a 234 km (145 mi) long perennial river fed by monsoons. The river originates at an altitude of 2,634 m (8,642 ft) in the Billimala range of the Nilgiris in the Western Ghats in Tamil Nadu. It flows westwards towards the Silent Valley National Park in Kerala, before later turning eastwards and flowing through the Attappadi valley in Palakkad district. Later, it re-enters Tamil Nadu, and flows through the districts of Nilgiris, Coimbatore, and Erode. The river basin covers an area of 1,410 km^{2} (540 sq mi). Various rivulets and tributaries join the Bhavani river during its course. Major tributaries include the Moyar, and Siruvani Rivers. Bhavani is one of the major tributaries of the Kaveri, which it joins at the Kooduthurai near Bhavani.

Industrial, municipal and agricultural pollution of the river results in poor water quality and negative impacts on the health of people, plants and animals dependent on the river water.

== Dams and canals ==
In Tamil Nadu, the Upper Bhavani dam is constructed close to the source of the Bhavani River in Nilgiris, and the Bhavanisagar Dam in the lower reaches of the river in the plains. After multiple proposals since the early 19th century, the upper and lower Bhavani projects were implemented in the mid 20th century. There are multiple minor check dams and irrigation canals constructed across the river in Kerala, largely constructed in the 21st century.

Bhavanisagar

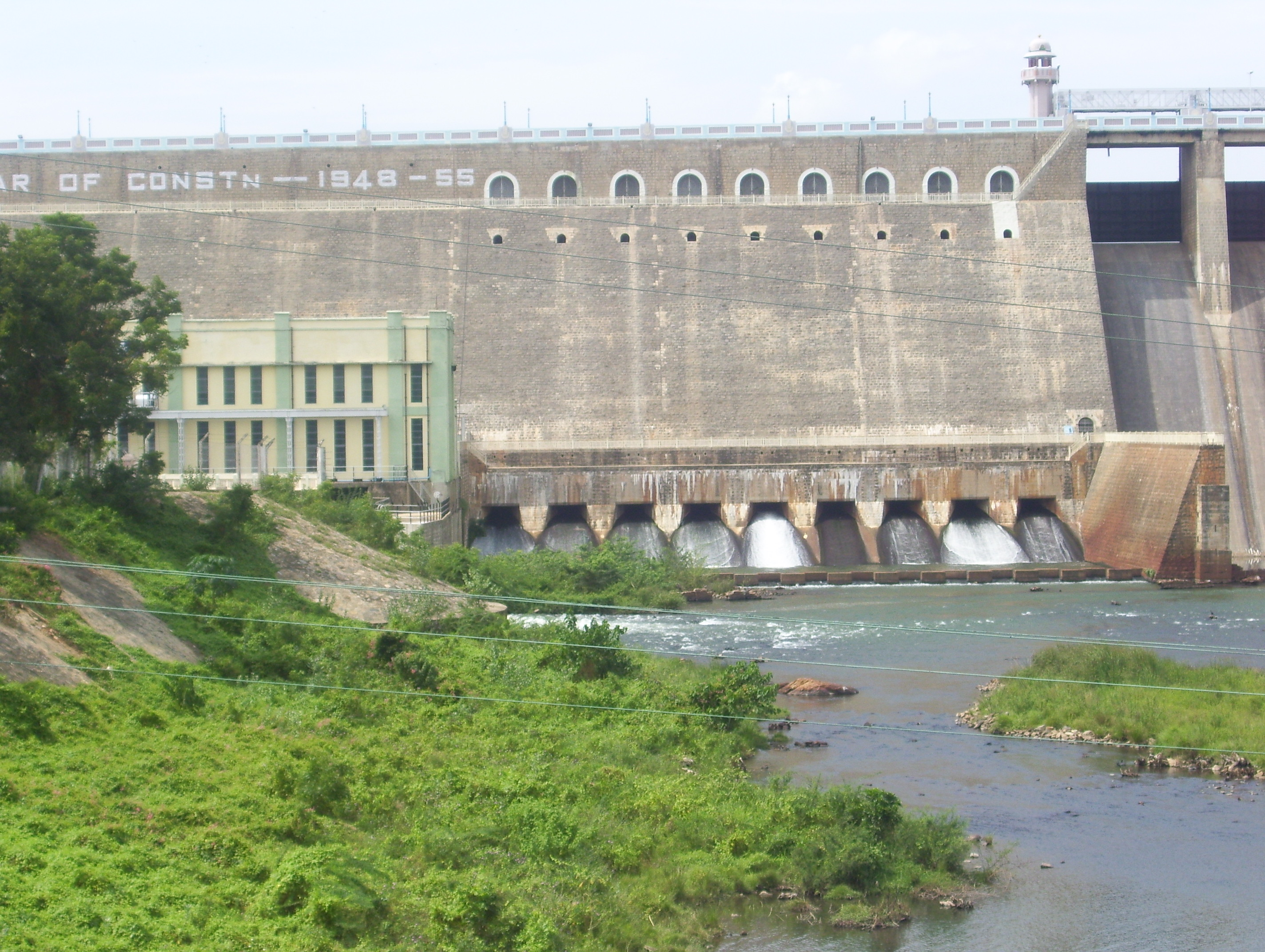
Bhavanisagar Dam

The Bhavanisagar Dam is located on the Bhavani River in Erode district. The dam is one of the largest earthen dams in the world. The dam is situated some 16 km (9.9 mi) west of Sathyamangalam. The Lower Bhavani Project was the first major irrigation project initiated in independent India in 1948. The dam was completed in 1955 at a cost of ₹210 million (equivalent to ₹23 billion or US$240 million in 2023) and was opened in 1956.

The dam is 8 km (5.0 mi) long and 40 m (130 ft) high, with a full reservoir level of 120 ft (37 m) and a capacity of 32.8×10^{9} cu ft (930×10^{6} m^{3}). The dam has two hydel power stations, one on the east bank canal and the other on the river. Each has a capacity of 16 MW (21,000 hp) for a total capacity of 32 MW (43,000 hp).

Kodiveri

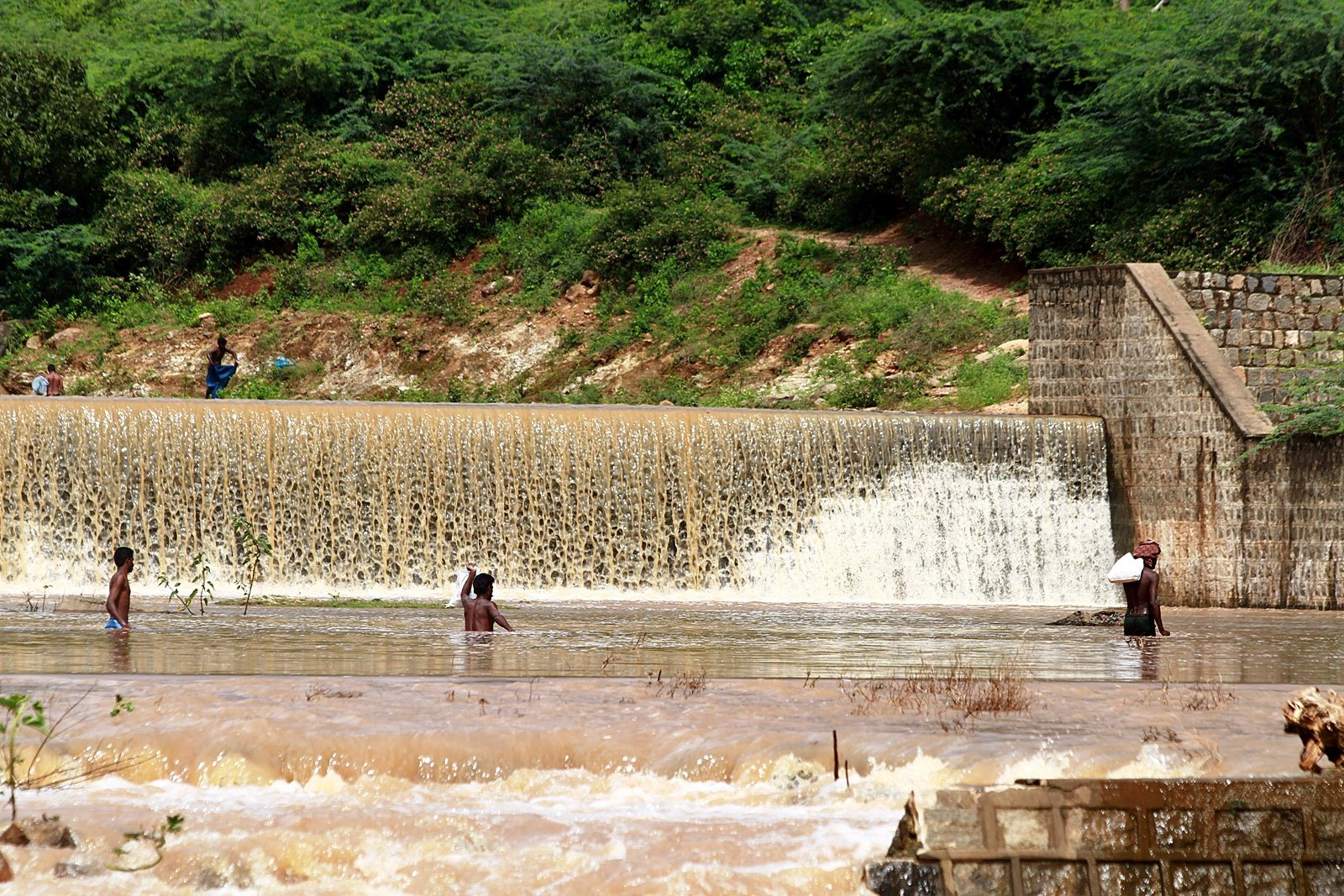
Kodiveri Dam

The Kodiveri Dam is located on the Bhavani River near Gobichettipalayam in Erode district. A channel was excavated at Kodiveri in 1125 CE by Kongalvan, a chieftain under the rule of Chola king Kulottunga I. The dam was constructed in the 17th century by Maharaja of Mysore. The dam feeds the Arakkankottai and Thadappalli canals constructed for irrigation.

Kalingarayan Anicut

Kalingarayan Anicut is located near Bhavani in Erode district. The 90.5 km (56.2 mi) long Kalingarayan Canal, originating from the anicut, irrigates about 15,743 acres (6,371 ha) of agricultural land. The project, including construction of the dam and canal, started in 1271 and was completed in 1283. It was constructed by Kongu chieftain Kalingarayan.
