= Vaniputhur =

- Panchayat town
- Location in Tamil Nadu, India
- Coordinates: 11°30′54″N 77°22′41″E
- Country: India
- State: Tamil Nadu
- District: Erode

Area
  - Total: 8 km^{2} (3.1 sq mi)

Population (2011)
  - Total: 12,044
  - Density: 1,500/km^{2} (3,900/sq mi)

Languages
  - Official: Tamil
- Time zone: UTC+5:30 (IST)

Vaniputhur is a panchayat town in Gobichettipalayam taluk of Erode district in the Indian state of Tamil Nadu. It is located in the north-western part of the state. Spread across an area of 8 km^{2} (3.1 sq mi), it had a population of 12,044 individuals as per the 2011 census.

== Geography and administration ==
Vaniputhur is located in Gobichettipalayam taluk, Gobichettipalayam division of Erode district in the Indian state of Tamil Nadu. Spread across an area of 8 km^{2} (3.1 sq mi), it is one of the 42 panchayat towns in the district. It is located in the north-western part of the state.

The town panchayat is headed by a chairperson, who is elected by the members, who are chosen through direct elections. The town forms part of the Gobichettipalayam Assembly constituency that elects its member to the Tamil Nadu legislative assembly and the Tiruppur Lok Sabha constituency that elects its member to the Parliament of India.

== Demographics ==
As per the 2011 census, Vaniputhur had a population of 12,044 individuals across 3,748 households. The population saw a marginal decrease compared to the previous census in 2001 when 12,207 inhabitants were registered. The population consisted of 5,937 males and 6,107 females. About 904 individuals were below the age of six years. The entire population is classified as urban. The town has an average literacy rate of 67.9%. About 14.1% of the population belonged to scheduled castes.

About 54.9% of the eligible population were employed, of which majority were involved in agriculture and allied activities. Hinduism was the majority religion which was followed by 94.8% of the population, with Islam (3.8%) and Christianity (0.9%) being minor religions.
