= Kolappalur =

- Panchayat town
- Location in Tamil Nadu, India
- Coordinates: 11°23′44″N 77°25′40″E
- Country: India
- State: Tamil Nadu
- District: Erode

Area
  - Total: 11.4 km^{2} (4.4 sq mi)

Population (2011)
  - Total: 9,607
  - Density: 843/km^{2} (2,180/sq mi)

Languages
  - Official: Tamil
- Time zone: UTC+5:30 (IST)

Kolappalur is a panchayat town in Gobichettipalayam taluk of Erode district in the Indian state of Tamil Nadu. It is located in the north-western part of the state. Spread across an area of 11.4 km^{2} (4.4 sq mi), it had a population of 9,607 individuals as per the 2011 census.

== Geography and administration ==
Kolappalur is located in Gobichettipalayam taluk, Gobichettipalayam division of Erode district in the Indian state of Tamil Nadu. Spread across an area of 8.48 km^{2} (3.27 sq mi), it is one of the 42 panchayat towns in the district. It is located in the north-western part of the state.

The town panchayat is headed by a chairperson, who is elected by the members, who are chosen through direct elections. The town forms part of the Gobichettipalayam Assembly constituency that elects its member to the Tamil Nadu legislative assembly and the Tiruppur Lok Sabha constituency that elects its member to the Parliament of India.

== Demographics ==
As per the 2011 census, Kolappalur had a population of 9,607 individuals across 2,979 households. The population saw a marginal increase compared to the previous census in 2001 when 8,570 inhabitants were registered. The population consisted of 4,798 males and 4,809 females. About 753 individuals were below the age of six years. The entire population is classified as urban. The town has an average literacy rate of 69.8%. About 21.8% of the population belonged to scheduled castes. Hinduism was the majority religion which was followed by 96.3% of the population, with Christianity (3.2%) and Islam (0.2%) being minor religions.

About 58% of the eligible population were employed. Kolappalur is known for its murukku, a crunchy savory popular in the region.
