= Nambiyur =

- Taluk headquarters _Town
- Location in Tamil Nadu, India
- Coordinates: 11.3568791°N 77.3189509°E
- Country: India
- State: Tamil Nadu
- Region: Kongu Nadu
- District: Erode

Area
  - Total: 286.09 km^{2} (110.46 sq mi)
- Elevation: 301 m (988 ft)

Population (2011)
  - Total: 26,379
  - Density: 92.205/km^{2} (238.81/sq mi)

Languages
  - Official: Tamil
- Time zone: UTC+5:30 (IST)
- PIN: 638458
- Vehicle registration: TN-36

Nambiyur is a Panchayat town and Panchayat Union in Nambiyur Taluk, Erode district, Tamil Nadu, in India.

"Nambiyur" is one of the new taluks in Erode district;Currently, Taluk office is present near Indian Oil petrol Bunk, in Nambiyur.

The Nambiyur was ruled by a small and proud king named "Nambi"; after his death, the people and the king's family named the town Nambiyur.

== Geography ==
Nambiyur is located at 11.3568791°N 77.3189509°E. It has an average elevation of 301 metres (988 feet).

== Demographics ==
As of 2011 India census, for Nambiyur Statistics Nambiyur had a population of 16,379. Males constitute 49.6% of the population and females 51.4%. Nambiyur has an average literacy rate of 65% (58% in 2001); male literacy is 73% (67% in 2001), and female literacy is 58% (50% in 2001). In Nambiyur, 9% of the population is in the age group 0–6 years.
