= Sathyamangalam =

Sathyamangalam Sathy
- Town
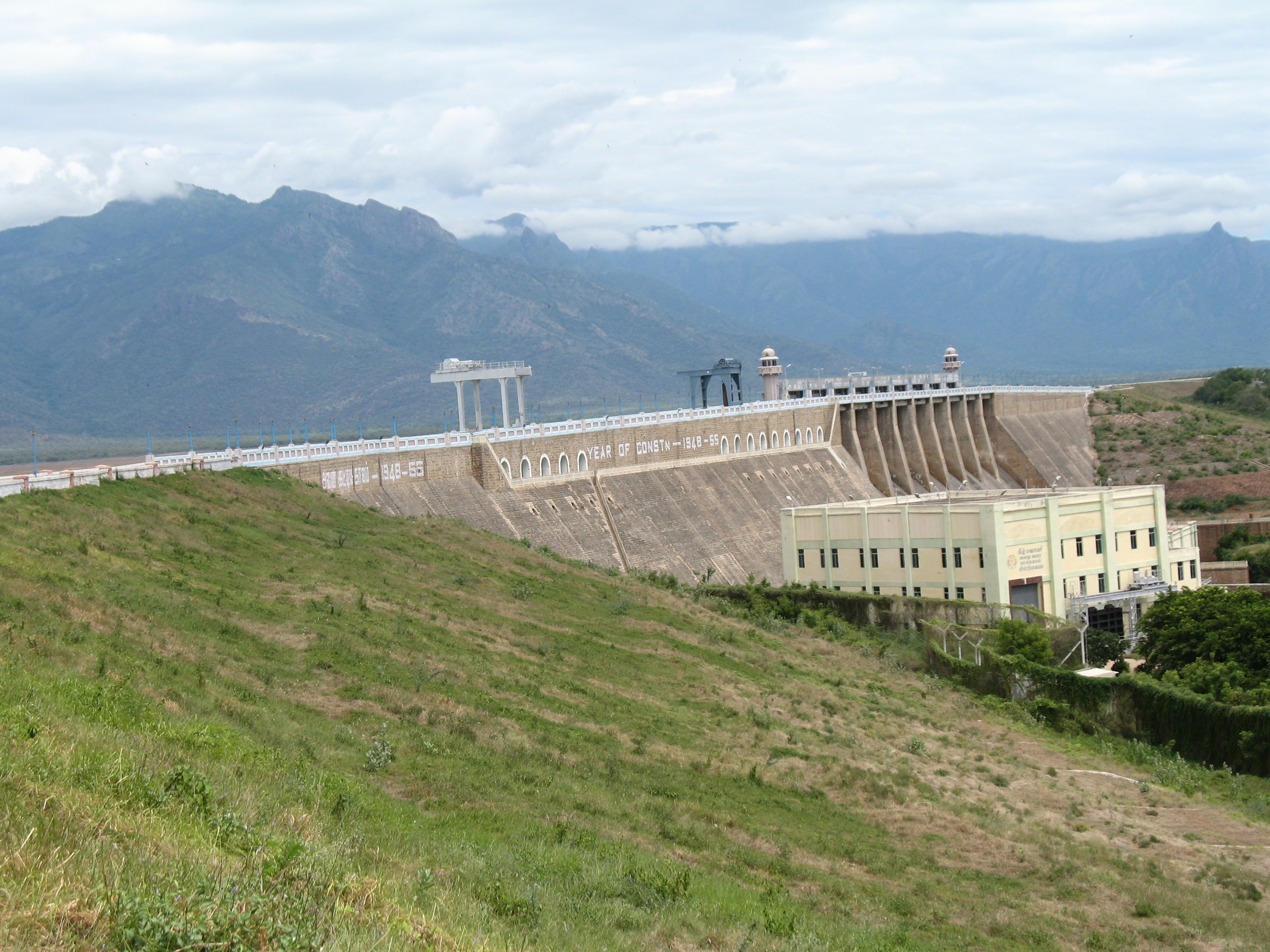
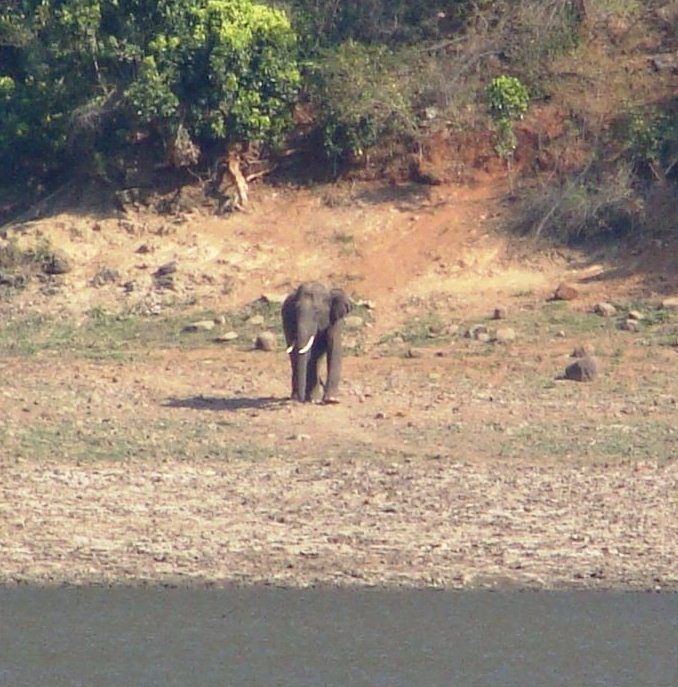
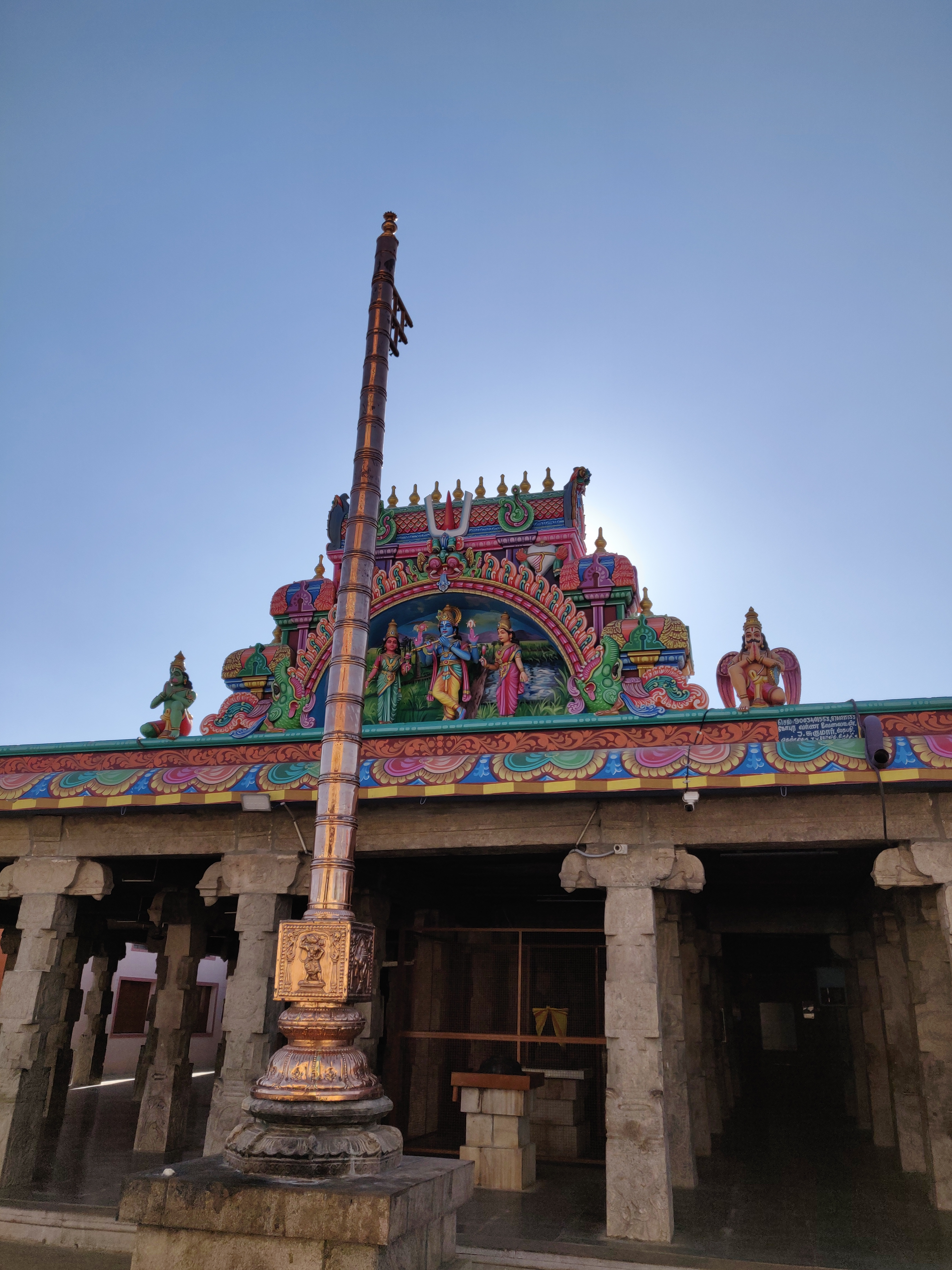
- Bhavanisagar Dam An Indian elephant at Sathyamangalam Tiger Reserve Venugopalaswami temple Sathyamangalam Forest
- Nicknames: Sandal city Tiger city
- Location in Tamil Nadu, India
- Coordinates: 11.5167°N 77.2500°E
- Country: India
- State: Tamil Nadu
- Region: Kongu Nadu
- District: Erode District
- Established: 1970

Government
  - Type: First Grade Municipality
  - Body: Sathyamangalam Municipality
  - Chairman: R. Janaki
  - Member of the Legislative Assembly: V. P. Tamilselvi
  - Member of Parliament: A. Raja

Languages
  - Official: Tamil
- Time zone: UTC+5:30 (IST)
- PIN: 638401, 402
- Telephone code: 04295
- Vehicle registration: TN36

Sathyamangalam (also known as Sathy) is a town and municipality in Erode district in the Indian state of Tamil Nadu. It lies on the banks of the Bhavani River, a tributary of the Kaveri straddling the Eastern and Western Ghats. It is the headquarters of Sathyamangalam taluk. It is located about 65 km (40 mi) from the district headquarters Erode. As of 2011, the town had a population of 37,816.

== History ==
The region was ruled by the Cheras and Vijayanagara Empire. It was captured by Tipu Sultan and after Tipu's defeat, British annexed it to their territory.

== Geography ==
Sathyamangalam is situated in the region between the Eastern and Western Ghats, which are separated by the Moyar River valley in Nilgiris towards the north. The general topography is not flat and covered by sloping lands. Bhavani River flows at the center of the town from west to east. Agricultural wet lands are predominant on both sides of the river and dry lands are predominant on the northern side of the town. The soil mainly consists of black loam, red loam and red sand.

=== Flora and fauna ===
A portion of the Sathyamangalam forests was declared as a wildlife sanctuary in 2008 and as a tiger reserve in 2013. Sathyamangalam was declared as reserve forest under the Wildlife Protection Act, 1972. It is contiguous with the Biligirirangan Temple Wildlife Sanctuary to the north in neighboring Chamarajanagar district of Karnataka, and together forms a vital corridor for elephant movements. The 2009 wildlife survey conducted by Government of Tamil Nadu enumerated 12 Bengal tiger, 836 Indian elephants, 779 blackbucks, and 20 leopards.

== Demographics ==
Religious census
Religion	Percent(%)
Hindu	86.3%
Muslim	10.2%
Christian	3.4%
Other	0.1%

According to 2011 census, Sathyamangalam had a population of 37,816 with a sex-ratio of 1,006 females for every 1,000 males, much above the national average of 929. A total of 3,382 were under the age of six, constituting 1,737 males and 1,645 females. Scheduled Castes and Scheduled Tribes accounted for 10.38% and 0.74% of the population respectively. The average literacy of the town was 72.02%, compared to the national average of 72.99%. The town had a total of 11,148 households. There were a total of 17,451 workers, comprising 1,094 cultivators, 1,882 main agricultural labourers, 741 in house hold industries, 11,272 other workers, 2,462 marginal workers, 26 marginal cultivators, 430 marginal agricultural labourers, 136 marginal workers in household industries and 1,870 other marginal workers. As per the religious census of 2011, Sathyamangalam had 86.3% Hindus, 10.2% Muslims, 3.4% Christians and 0.1% others.

== Administration and politics ==
Sathyamangalam is the headquarters for Sathyamangalam taluka in Erode District. The town was upgraded to a third grade municipality from the status of town panchayat in 1970 and subsequently as a second grade Municipality in 1977. It was elevated to a first grade municipality in 1998. Sathyamanagalam assembly constituency was merged with Bhavani Sagar as a part of delimitation by the Election Commission of India. It was a part of the Gobichettipalayam parliamentary constituency until 2010 before being merged with Nilgiris.

== Economy ==
Sathyamangalam is a town with an agricultural linter land on all sides. Sathyamangalam municipality's area in 29.24 km, comprising four revenue villages. Only 11.46% of the municipal area is developed as urban area and the remaining 89.54% remains undeveloped agricultural land.

== Transport ==
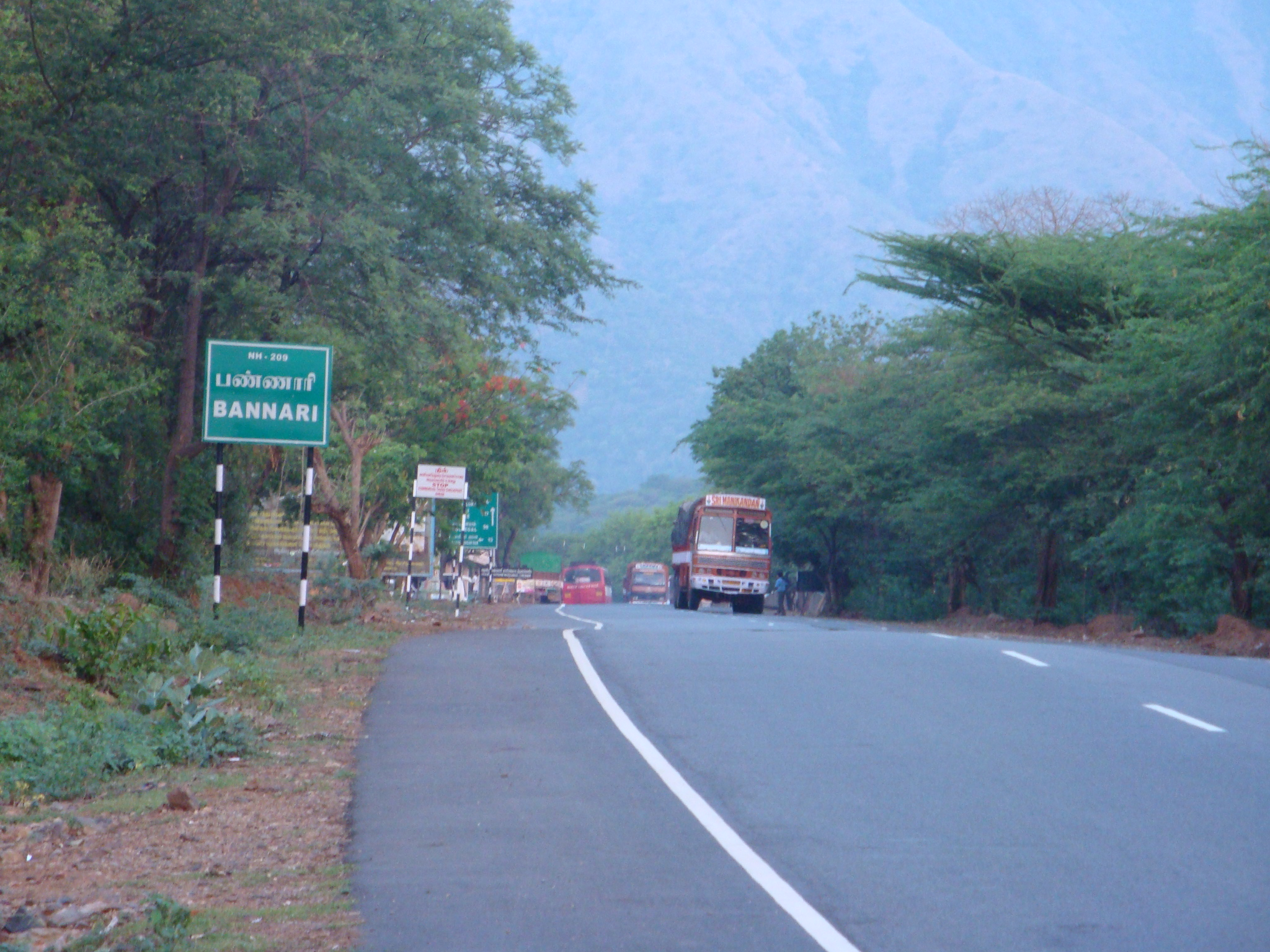
Sathyamanagalam to Mysuru NH 948

The town is situated at a distance of 65 km from district headquarters Erode, connected through State Highway 15 via Gobichettipalayam. The Coimbatore-Bangalore National Highway (NH 948) passes through this town. It is well connected by buses from nearby towns and cities with frequent buses available to/from Coimbatore, Erode, Tiruppur, Gobichettipalayam and Mysore. The nearest railway station is at Tiruppur (57 km). A proposal to construct a railway line connecting Mysore with Erode via Sathyamangalam was mooted during the British rule in 1915. Four official surveys were made in 1922, 1936, 1942 and as recently as 2008, but the plan failed to take off due to the concerns of railway line passing through the Sathyamangalam Wildlife Sanctuary. The nearest airport is Coimbatore International Airport, located 74 kilometres (46 mi) from the town. The airport has regular flights from/to major domestic destinations and international destinations like Sharjah, Colombo and Singapore.

== Places of interest ==
=== Sathyamangalam Tiger Reserve ===
Sathyamangalam Tiger Reserve is a protected area and tiger reserve located along the area straddling both the Western Ghats and Eastern Ghats on the outskirts of the town. The Sathyamangalam Forest Division is part of the Bramhagiri-Nilgiris-Eastern Ghats Elephant Reserve notified in 2003. In 2008, part of the Sathyamangalam Forest Division was declared as a wildlife sanctuary and enlarged in 2011, it covers a forest area of 1,411.6 km^{2} (545.0 mi^{2}) and is the largest wildlife sanctuary in Tamil Nadu. In 2013, an area of 1,408.6 km^{2} (543.9 mi^{2}) of the erstwhile sanctuary was notified as a tiger reserve. It was the fourth tiger reserve established in Tamil Nadu as a part of Project Tiger and is the third largest in the state.

=== Bhavanisagar Dam ===
Bhavanisagar dam is located about 16 km (9.9 mi) west of Sathyamangalam. The dam is constructed on the Bhavani River. It is one of the world's largest earthen dams.

== See also ==
- Satyamangalam block
