= Gobichettipalayam =

Gobichettipalayam Gobi
- Town
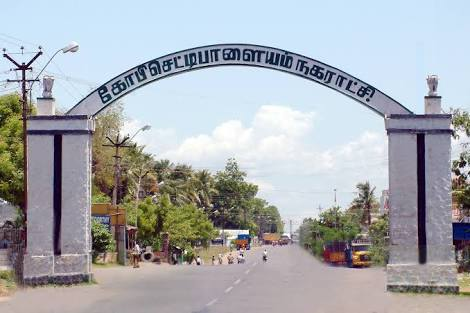
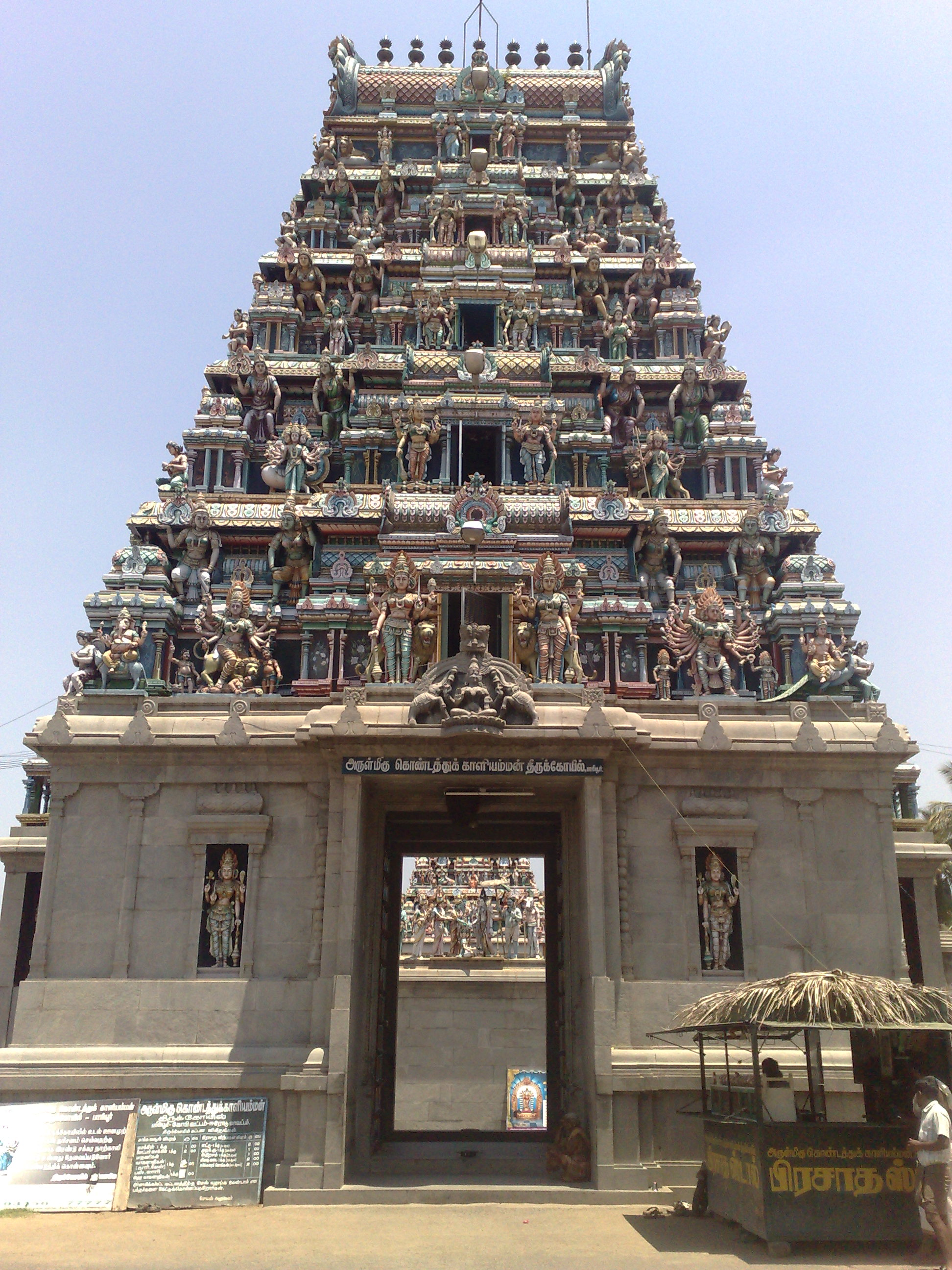
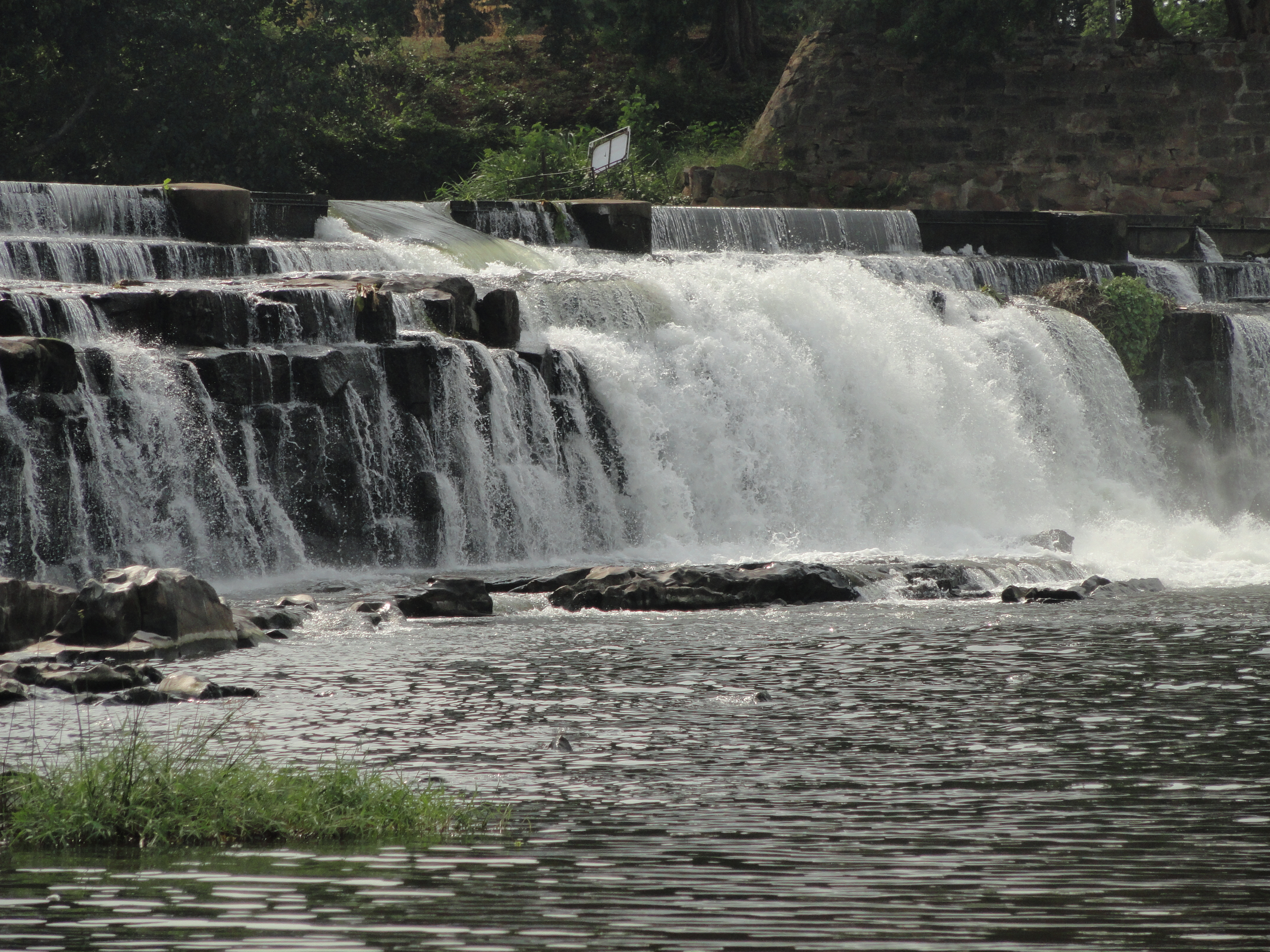
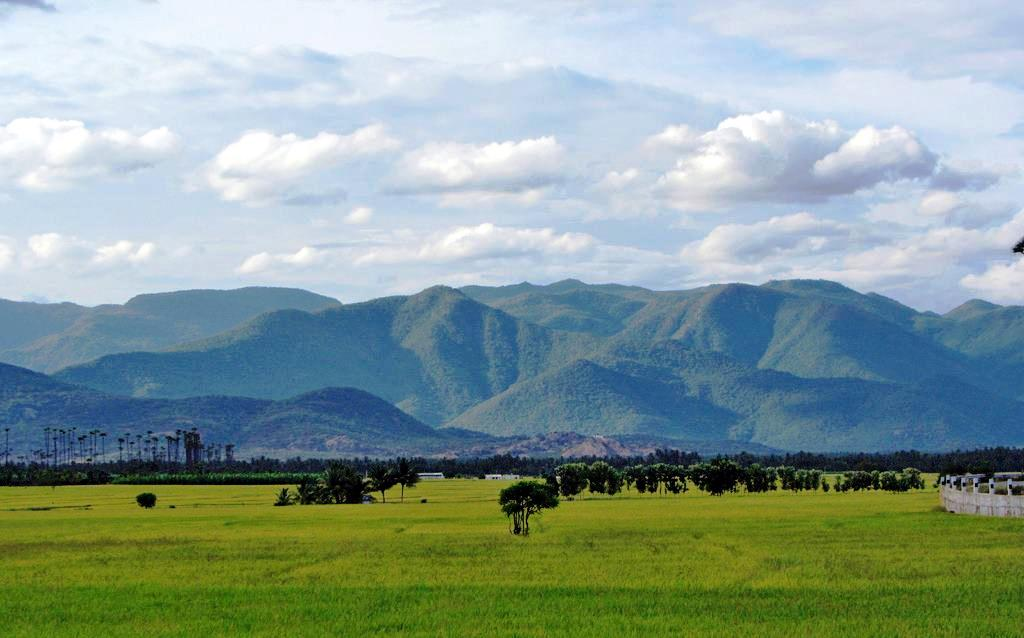
- Arch at entrance Pariyur temple Kodiveri Dam Eastern Ghats
- Nickname: Chinna Kodambakkam (Mini Kollywood)
- Gobichettipalayam, Tamil Nadu
- Coordinates: 11°27′17.6″N 77°26′11.4″E
- Country: India
- State: Tamil Nadu
- Region: Kongu Nadu
- District: Erode District
- Municipality: 1949

Government
  - Body: Gobichettipalayam Municipal Corporation
  - Chairman: N. R. Nagaraj
  - Member of the Legislative Assembly: K. A. Sengottaiyan
  - Member of Parliament: K. Subbarayan
- Elevation: 241 m (791 ft)

Population (2011)
  - Total: 59,523

Languages
  - Official: Tamil
- Time zone: UTC+5:30 (IST)
- PIN: 638452, 638476
- Telephone code: 91(04285)
- Vehicle registration: TN36
- Literacy: 74%
- Lok Sabha constituency: Tiruppur
- Vidhan Sabha constituency: Gobichettipalayam
- Planning agency: GMC
- Climate: Tropical climate (Köppen)
- Avg. annual temperature: 28 °C (82 °F)
- Avg. summer temperature: 34.3 °C (93.7 °F)
- Avg. winter temperature: 24 °C (75 °F)
- Website: Gobi Municipality

Gobichettipalayam (Tamil: [koːbitɕtɕeʈʈippaːɭaɪjam]) is a town and municipality in Erode district of the Indian state of Tamil Nadu. It is the administrative headquarters of Gobichettipalayam taluk. It is situated close to the centre of the South Indian Peninsula at 213 m (699 ft) above sea level, straddled by the Eastern Ghats. It is located 35 km (22 mi) from the district headquarters Erode, 44 km (27 mi) from Tiruppur and 80 km (50 mi) from Coimbatore. Agriculture and textile industries are major contributors to the economy of the town.

The town is a part of Gobichettipalayam constituency that elects its member to the Tamil Nadu legislative assembly and the Tirupur constituency that elects its member of parliament to the Lok Sabha. The town is administered by Gobichettipalayam Municipality, which was established in 1949. Gobichettipalayam has a population of 59,523 as per the 2011 census. It is known as "Mini Kollywood" because of the film production that takes place here and many films in Tamil and other languages have been shot here.

== History ==
A major part of present-day Gobichettipalayam was previously known as "Veerapandi Gramam", and documents and records still use that name. The town was part of the country ruled by king Vēl Pāri, who is regarded as one of the Kadai ēzhu vallal (the last seven great patrons). Pariyur, a temple town near Gobichettipalayam was named after him. The region was later ruled by the Cheras and Vijayanagara Empire with the town deriving its name after Gobi Chetti, a Vijayanagara Polygar. It was captured by Tipu Sultan and after Tipu's defeat, British annexed it to their territory. After Indian Independence, the town became part of Madras State, which was later renamed as Tamil Nadu.

== Geography and climate ==
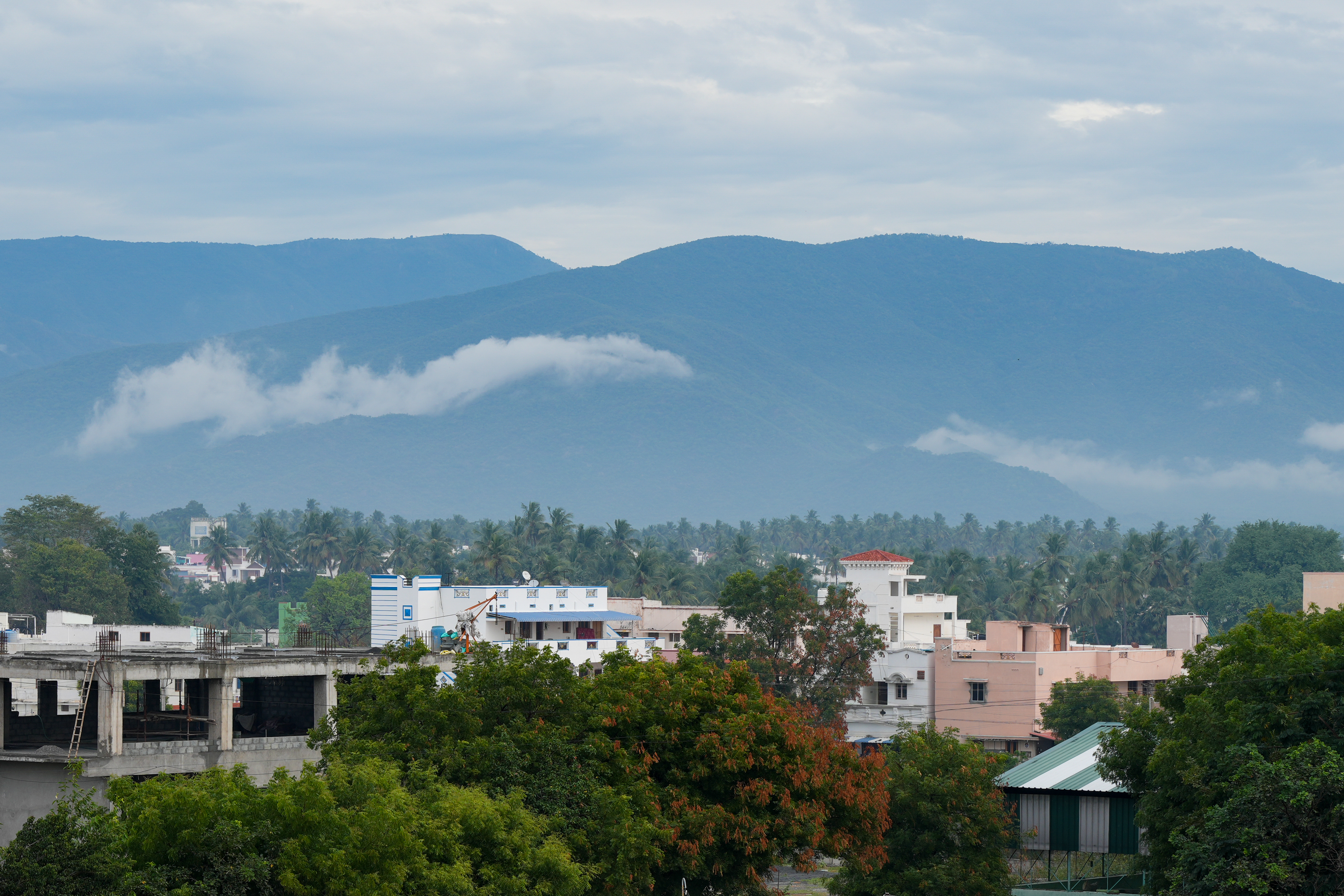
Eastern Ghats north of the town

Gobichettipalayam is located in Kongu Nadu, the northwestern part of Tamil Nadu about 400 km (250 mi) south west of Chennai. The southern slopes of the Eastern Ghats lie north of the town. The Bhavani River traverses across the region. The temperature is moderately warm except during the summer months when it is very hot. Rainfall is moderate to high, unpredictable and unevenly distributed, and the town gets an average annual rainfall of 92 cm (36 in). The soil mainly consists of black loam, red loam and red sand. In general, the soil in and around the city is fertile and good for agriculture and the surrounding water logged rice fields contribute to the high humidity levels.

Climate data for Gobichettipalayam
Month	Jan	Feb	Mar	Apr	May	Jun	Jul	Aug	Sep	Oct	Nov	Dec	Year
Mean daily maximum °C (°F)	30 (86)	32 (90)	35 (95)	35 (95)	34 (93)	31 (88)	30 (86)	31 (88)	32 (90)	31 (88)	29 (84)	29 (84)	32 (90)
Mean daily minimum °C (°F)	18 (64)	19 (66)	21 (70)	23 (73)	23 (73)	22 (72)	22 (72)	22 (72)	22 (72)	22 (72)	21 (70)	19 (66)	22 (72)
Average rainfall mm (inches)	14 (0.6)	12 (0.5)	19 (0.7)	53 (2.1)	76 (3.0)	38 (1.5)	57 (2.2)	42 (1.7)	56 (2.2)	153 (6.0)	123 (4.8)	50 (2.0)	693 (27.3)
Source: Erode district collectorate

== Demographics ==
Religion in Gobichettipalayam (2011)
Religion	Percent(%)
Hindu	90.3%
Muslim	7.1%
Christian	2.5%
Other or not stated	0.1%

According to 2011 census, Gobichettipalayam had a population of 59,523 of which 28,866 are males while 30,657 are females. The town had a sex ratio of 1,062 females for every 1,000 males, much above the national average of 929. It had a literacy rate of 85.2%, higher than the national average of 72.99%. About 4,669 people were under the age of six including 2,364 males and 2,305 females. Scheduled Castes and Scheduled Tribes accounted for 10.74% and 0.08% of the population respectively. The town had a total of 17,064 households and 25,225 engaged workers.

Kongu Vellalar form a major proportion of the population. There are also a significant number of Sengunthar, Vanniyar, Dalit, Nadar and Vettuva Gounder. As per the religious census of 2011, the town had 90.3% Hindus, 7.1% Muslims, 2.5% Christians and 0.1% others.

== Administration and politics ==
Administrative officials
Title	Name
Chairman	N. R. Nagaraj
MLA	K. A. Sengottaiyan
MP	K. Subbarayan

The town is administered by the Gobichettipalayam Municipality. The municipal body was constituted on 1 October 1949 and was elevated to Grade II on 10 February 1970. It was later upgraded to first Grade on 1 October 1977 and Selection Grade on 2 December 2008. In 1952, the municipality under then chairman G. S. Lakshman Iyer, was amongst the foremost in the country to have abolished manual scavenging.

The town is part of the Gobichettipalayam assembly constituency that elects a member to the Tamil Nadu legislative assembly. The town was part of the Gobichettipalayam parliamentary constituency until 2009. After a delimination exercise by the Election Commission of India, the Gobichettipalayam assembly constituency became part of the newly formed Tirupur Lok Sabha constituency.

== Transport ==
The municipality has 67.604 km (42.007 mi) of roads of which 6.6 km (4.1 mi) is owned by the State Highways Department. The town is well connected by roads with the major arterial roads including State Highway 81, State Highway 15, State Highway 15A. The Tamil Nadu State Transport Corporation operates a depot as a part of the Coimbatore division of TNSTC. Buses ply to all major towns and cities within Tamil Nadu and neighboring state of Karnataka. KSRTC buses also connect to the town due to its proximity to Karnataka.

The nearest major railway station is Erode Junction located 38 kilometres (24 mi) from the town. A proposal to construct a railway line connecting Mysore with Erode via Gobichettipalayam was mooted during the British rule in 1915. Four official surveys were made in 1922, 1936, 1942 and as recently as 2008, but the plan failed to take off due to the concerns of railway line passing through the Sathyamangalam Wildlife Sanctuary. The nearest airport is Coimbatore International Airport, located 74 km (46 mi) from the town. The airport has regular flights from/to major domestic destinations and international destinations like Sharjah, Colombo and Singapore.

== Education ==
Gobichettipalayam has a good educational infrastructure. Notable schools include Diamond Jubilee Higher Secondary School, which was established over 100 years ago and was visited by Mahatma Gandhi, and Shree Vidyalaya, which has a full-time dyslexic center. The town is home to Gobi Arts and Science College, one of the oldest arts colleges in the state. The city itself has only a few colleges, but its proximity to Coimbatore and Erode makes it an ideal educational hub.

== Economy ==
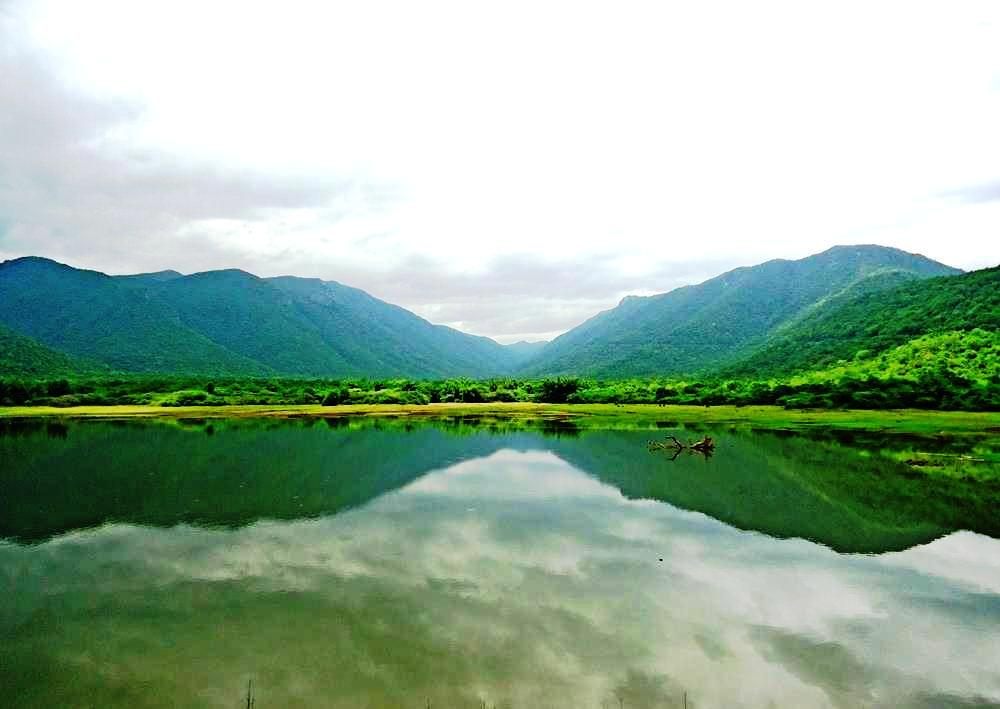
Bhavani River which irrigates most of the lands around the town.

The town has been described by the government as "bi-functional", with 31% of the work force engaged in agriculture, 56% in trading and other activities and 13% in industry. A number of banks have their branches in the town with private banker ICICI Bank establishing its third branch in Tamil Nadu here. The economy is predominantly dependent on agriculture. The economy of Gobichettipalayam centers on agriculture, with paddy, sugarcane, plantain, tobacco and turmeric being the principal crops. There are regulated market places run by the Government of India for the trade of agricultural products mainly turmeric, copra and bananas. The town is known for its greenery which attracts cine industry. It is known as "Mini Kollywood" because of the film production that takes place here and many films in Tamil and other languages have been shot here.

Gobichettipalayam is one of the leading producers of silk cocoon in the country. Mulberry cultivation has increased in the recent years and a silk research extension center was established by the Government of Tamil Nadu in collaboration with the Central Silk Board. India's second automated silk reeling unit was established here in 2008. A large number of spinning mills have come up in to support to the weaving and knitwear to supplement Tirupur. IT and BPO sectors are also developing with a few start up companies based out of the town. Other industries include cotton textiles, motors, pumps, automobile spares, textile machinery manufacturing, castings and machined parts.

== Culture ==
Kongu Tamil, a dialect of Tamil is the language spoken by majority of the people. English is used as an official language along with Tamil. Other languages spoken include Malayalam, Kannada and Telugu. The cuisine is predominantly South Indian with rice as its base. Most locals still retain their rural tradition, with many restaurants still serving food on a banana leaf. Idly, dosa, vada-sambar and biryani are popular among the locals.

== Places of interest ==
- Gunderipallam Dam
- Kodiveri Dam
- Pachaimalai Subramanya Swamy Temple
- Pavalamalai Muthukumara Swamy Temple
- Pariyur Kondathu Kaliamman Temple
- Perumpallam Dam

== Notable people ==
- A. V. Ilango, writer and artist
- G. S. Lakshman Iyer, freedom fighter and philanthropist
- G. V. Loganathan, former professor at Virginia Tech, killed in Virginia Tech shooting
- K. Bhagyaraj, film actor and director
- K. A. Sengottaiyan, former Minister of School Education, Sports and Youth Welfare, Government of Tamil Nadu
- K. S. Ramaswamy Gounder, freedom fighter and former union minister
- S. M. Palaniappan, former Member of Legislative Assembly

== See also ==
- List of Educational Institutions in Gobichettipalayam
- Gobichettipalayam (Lok Sabha constituency)
- Gobichettipalayam Municipal Corporation
