= Second Karunanidhi ministry =

Government of Tamil Nadu, India (1971–76)

- 3rd Ministry of Tamil Nadu

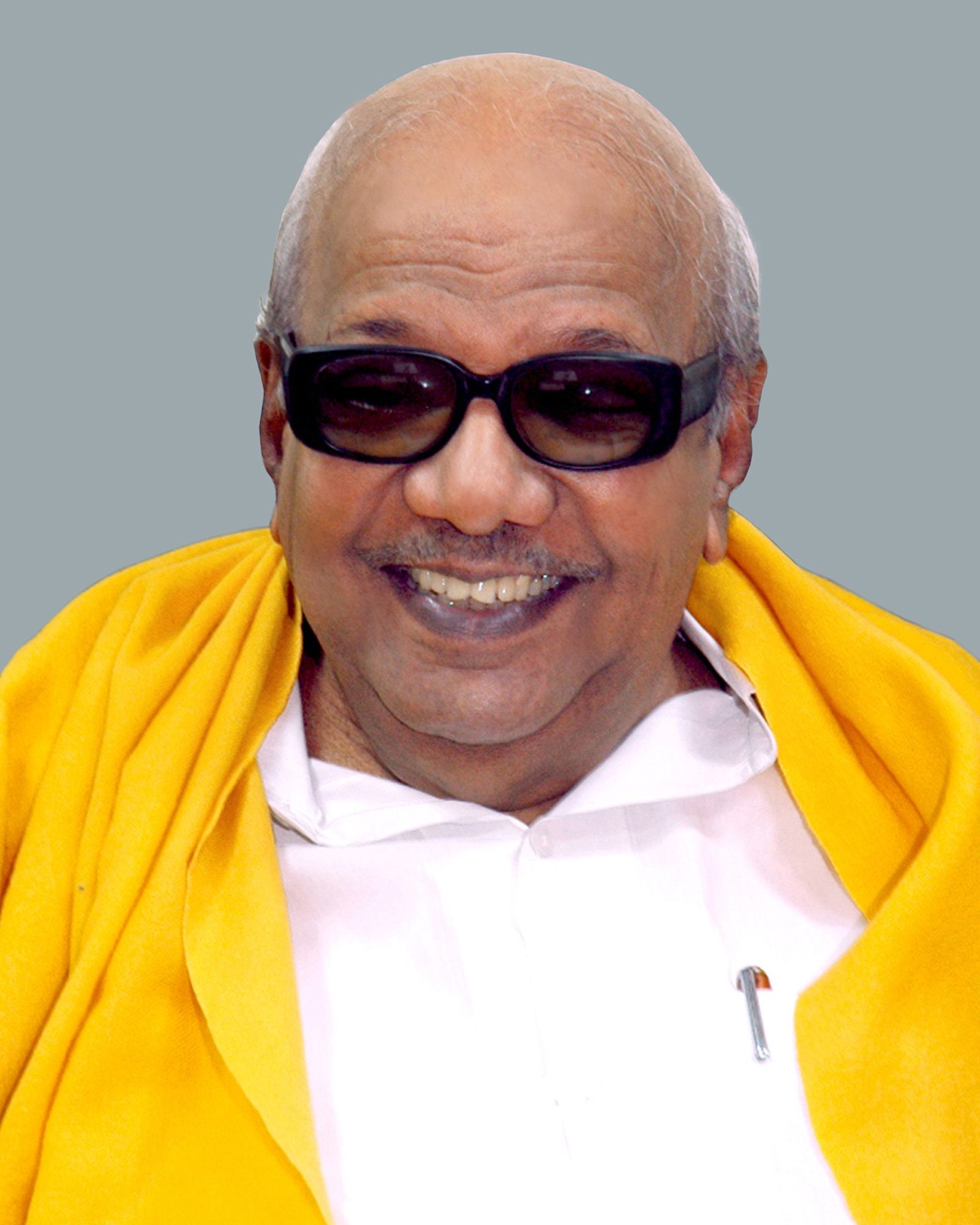
- M. Karunanidhi
- Date formed: 15 March 1971
- Date dissolved: 31 January 1976

People and organisations
- Head of state: Governor Sardar Ujjal Singh
- Head of government: M. Karunanidhi
- Member parties: DMK
- Status in legislature: Majority
- Opposition party: INC
- Opposition leader: R. Ponnappan Nadar(assembly)

History
- Election: 1971
- Legislature term: 5 Years
- Predecessor: First Karunanidhi ministry
- Successor: First Ramachandran ministry

After the Fifth General Elections held in 1971 a new Ministry with M. Karunanidhi as Chief Minister was formed on 15 March 1971.

== Cabinet ministers ==
S.no	Name	Designation	Party
Chief Minister
1.	M. Karunanidhi	Chief Minister: Minister for Finance	DMK
Cabinet Ministers
2.	DR. V. R. Nedunchezhiyan	Minister for Education	DMK
3.	K. Anbazhagan	Minister for Health	DMK
4.	P. U. Shanmugam	Minister for Public Works	DMK
5.	S. Madhavan	Minister for Industries	DMK
6.	S. J. Sadiq Pasha	Minister for Revenue	DMK
7.	Si. Pa. Adithanar	Minister for Agriculture	DMK
8.	Mannai P. Narayanaswamy	Minister for Food and Co-operation	DMK
9.	K. Rajaram	Minister for Labour and Transport	DMK
10.	C. V. M. Annamalai	Minister for Social Welfare	DMK
11.	O. P. Raman	Minister for Electricity	DMK
12.	Panruti S. Ramachandran	Minister for Local Administration	DMK
13.	M. Kannappan	Minister for Religious Endowments	DMK
14.	N. Rajangam	Minister for Harijan Welfare	DMK
