= First Karunanidhi ministry =

Government of Tamil Nadu, India (1969–1971)

- 2nd Ministry of Tamil Nadu

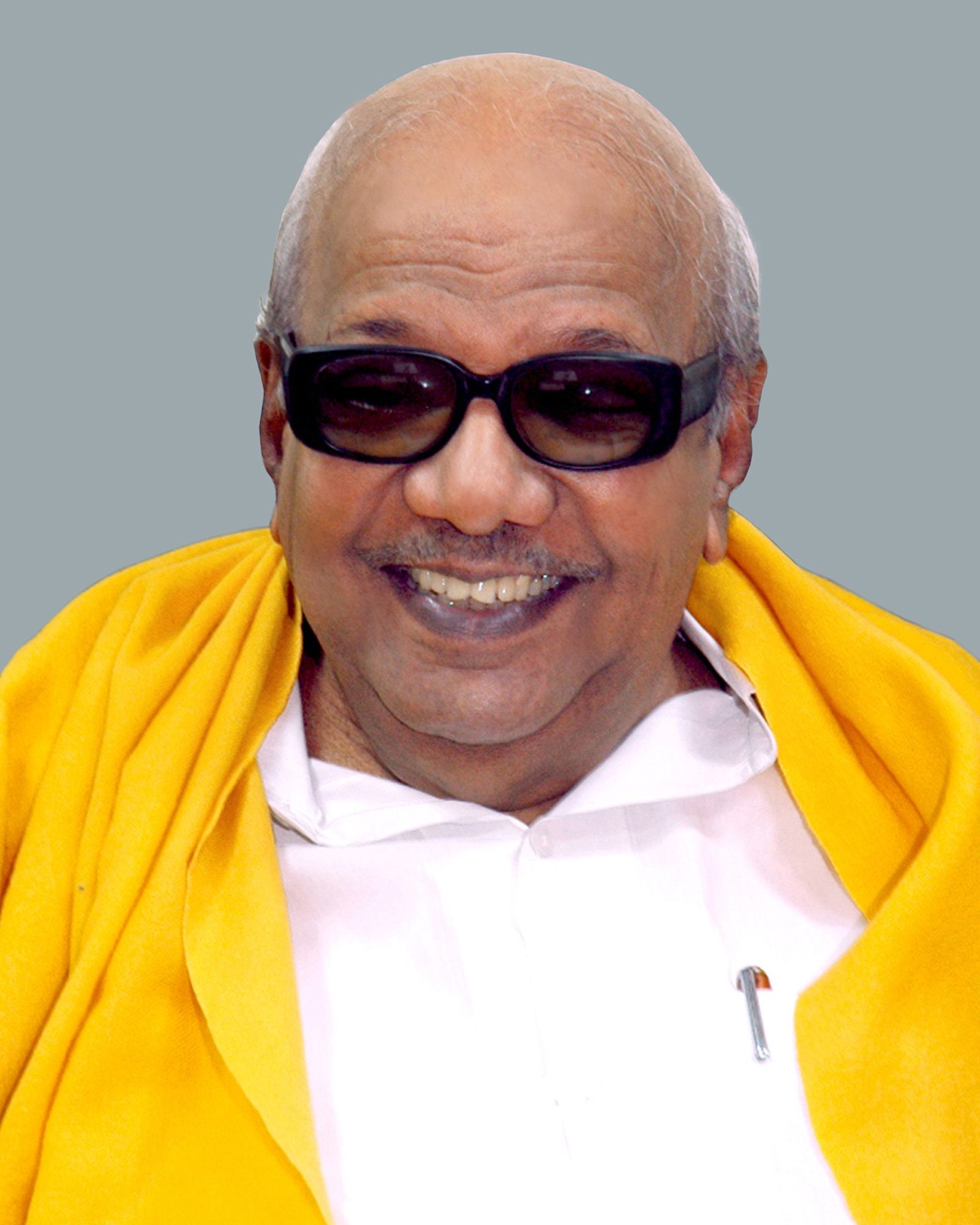
- Date formed: 10 February 1969
- Date dissolved: 14 March 1971

People and organisations
- Head of state: Governor Sardar Ujjal Singh
- Head of government: M. Karunanidhi
- Member parties: DMK
- Status in legislature: Majority
- Opposition party: INC
- Opposition leader: P. G. Karuthiruman(assembly)

History
- Election: 1967
- Legislature term: 5 Years
- Predecessor: (Note: First Nedunchezhiyan ministry(acting)); C. N. Annadurai ministry
- Successor: Second Karunanidhi ministry

After C. N. Annadurai died, an acting ministry was elected. The election of M. Karunanidhi as the leader of the Dravida Munnetra Kazhagam Legislature Party the interim Council of Ministers headed by V. R. Nedunchezhiyan resigned on 10 February 1969 and the Governor appointed M. Karunanidhi as Chief Minister on 10 February 1969.

== Cabinet ministers ==
S.no	Name	Designation	Party
Chief Minister
1.	M. Karunanidhi	Chief Minister	DMK
Cabinet Ministers
2.	DR. V. R. NEDUNCHEZHIYAN	Minister for Education and Health	DMK
3.	SATYAVANIMUTHU	Minister for Agriculture and Harijan Welfare	DMK
4.	N. V. NATARAJAN	Minister for Backward Classes	DMK
5.	P. U. SHANMUGAM	Minister for Commercial Taxes	DMK
6.	S. MADHAVAN	Minister for Industries	DMK
7.	S. J. SADIQ PASHA	Minister for Public Works	DMK
8.	SI. PA. ADITANAR	Minister for Co-operation	DMK
9.	K. V. SUBBIAH	Minister for Religious Endowments	DMK
10.	O. P. RAMAN	Minister for Electricity	DMK
