= Annadurai ministry =

Government of Madras/Tamil Nadu, India (1967–69)

Annadurai Ministry
- 1st Ministry of Tamil Nadu
- Head of the government
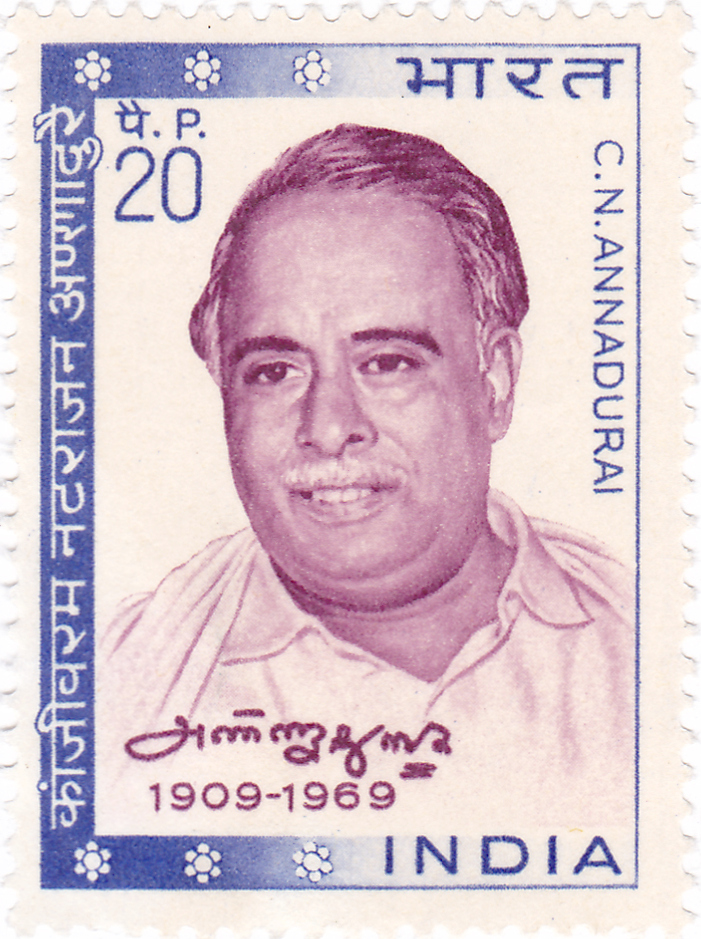
- Dr. C. N. Annadurai; Former Chief Minister of Tamil Nadu
- Date formed: 6 March 1967
- Date dissolved: 3 February 1969

People and organisations
- Governor: Ujjal Singh
- Chief Minister: C. N. Annadurai
- Chief Minister's history: Teacher
- Total no. of members: 9
- Member party: Dravida Munnetra Kazhagam
- Status in legislature: Majority
- Opposition party: Indian National Congress
- Opposition leader: P. G. Karuthiruman

History
- Election: 1967
- Outgoing election: 1962
- Legislature terms: 1 year, 334 days
- Predecessor: Bhakthavatsalam ministry
- Successor: First Nedunchezhiyan ministry (acting); First Karunanidhi ministry

The Ministry of Annadurai was the Council of Ministers, headed by C. N. Annadurai, that was formed after the fourth legislative assembly election, which was held in three phases on 15th, 18th and 21st February 1967. The results of the election were announced in February 1967, and this led to the formation of the 4th Assembly. On 6 March 1967, the Council took office.

== Constitutional requirement ==
=== For the Council of Ministers to aid and advise Governor ===
According to Article 163 of the Indian Constitution,

# There shall be a Council of Ministers with the Chief Minister at the head to aid and advise the Governor in the exercise of his function, except in so far as he is by or under this Constitution required to exercise his functions or any of them in his discretion.

1. If any question arises whether any matter is or is not a matter as respects which the Governor is by or under this Constitution required to act in his discretion, the decision of the Governor in his discretion shall be final, and the validity of anything done by the Governor shall not be called in question on the ground that he ought or ought not to have acted in his discretion.
2. The question whether any, and if so what, advice was tendered by Ministers to the Governor shall not be inquired into in any court.

This means that the Ministers serve under the pleasure of the Governor and he/she may remove them, on the advice of the Chief Minister, whenever they want.

The Chief Minister shall be appointed by the Governor and the other Ministers shall be appointed by the Governor on the advice of the Chief Minister, and the Minister shall hold office during the pleasure of the Governor:
Provided that in the States of Bihar, Madhya Pradesh and Orissa, there shall be a Minister in charge of tribal welfare who may in addition be in charge of the welfare of the Scheduled Castes and backward classes or any other work.

# The Council of Minister shall be collectively responsible to the Legislative Assembly of the State.

1. Before a Minister enters upon his office, the Governor shall administer to him the oaths of office and of secrecy according to the forms set out for the purpose in the Third Schedule.
2. A Minister who for any period of six consecutive months is not a member of the Legislature of the State shall at the expiration of that period cease to be a Minister.
3. The salaries and allowances of Ministers shall be such as the Legislature of the State may from time to time by law determine and, until the Legislature of the State so determines, shall be a specified in the Second Schedule.

== Council of Ministers ==
Chief Minister
No.	Name	Constituency	Portfolio	Departments	Political party
1	C. N. Annadurai	Leader of the Legislative Council	Chief Minister	Public; General Administration; Matters relating to Indian Civil Service and Indian Administrative Service Officers; District Revenue Officers and Deputy Collectors; Finance; Planning; Police; Elections; Prohibition; Indian Overseas; Refugees and; Evacuees	Dravida Munnetra Kazhagam
Cabinet Ministers
2	V. R. Nedunchezhiyan	Triplicane	Minister for Education and Industries	Education (including Technical Education); Official Language; Industries; Textiles; Yarn; Handlooms; Mines and Minerals; Iron and Steel Control; Electricity; Labour; Companies; Religious Endowments and; Legislature	Dravida Munnetra Kazhagam
3	M. Karunanidhi	Saidapet	Minister for Public Works	Public Works; Minor Irrigation (including Special Minor Irrigation Project Works); Housing; Highways; Transport; Nationalised Transport and; Ports	Dravida Munnetra Kazhagam
4	K. A. Mathiazhagan	Thousand Lights	Minister for Food and Revenue	Food; Revenue; Board of Revenue; District Revenue Establishments and; Commercial Taxes	Dravida Munnetra Kazhagam
5	A. Govindasamy	Mugaiyur	Minister for Agriculture	Agriculture; Animal Husbandry; Fisheries; Forests and; Cinchona	Dravida Munnetra Kazhagam
6	Sathiavani Muthu	Perambur	Minister for Harijan Welfare and Information	Harijan Welfare; Information and Publicity Department; Stationery and Printing; Government Press; Cinematograph Act and; Women's and Children's Welfare	Dravida Munnetra Kazhagam
7	S. Madhavan	Tiruppattur	Minister for Law and Co-operation	Law; Co-operation; Courts; Prisons; Registration; Approved Schools and Vigilance Services; Passports; Legislation on Chits; Legislation on Money Lending (Rural Indebtedness) and; Legislation on Weights and Measures	Dravida Munnetra Kazhagam
8	S. J. Sadiq Pasha	Udumalaipettai	Minister for Public Health	Public Health; Medicines; Accommodation Control; Orphanages; Beggars; News Print Control; Waqf and; Prices and Supplies of Goods Act	Dravida Munnetra Kazhagam
9	M. Muthuswamy	Namakkal	Minister for Local Administration	Municipal Administration; Community Development; Panchayats; Bhoodan and Gramdan; Khadi and Village Industries; Rural Industries Project and; Ex-Servicemen	Dravida Munnetra Kazhagam
