= Bhaktavatsalam ministry =

Government of Madras, India (1963–67)

- Ministry of Madras
- Head of the government
- Date formed: 2 October 1963
- Date dissolved: 5 March 1967

People and organisations
- Chief Minister: M. Bhaktavatsalam
- Member party: Indian National Congress
- Status in legislature: Majority
- Opposition party: Dravida Munnetra Kazhagam
- Opposition leader: C. N. Annadurai

History
- Election: 1962
- Outgoing election: 1957
- Predecessor: Kamaraj ministry
- Successor: Annadurai ministry

The Ministry of Bhaktavatsalam was the Council of Ministers headed by M. Bhaktavatsalam.

== Cabinet ==
The council of ministers in the Bhaktavatsalam cabinet:

Minister	Portfolios
M. Bhaktavatsalam	Chief Minister
Jothi Venkatachalam	Health
R. Venkataraman	Industries
S. M. Abdul Majeed	Local Administration
P. Kakkan	Home
V. Ramaiah	Food
Nalla Senapathi Sarkari Manradiar	Co-operation
G. Bhuvaraghan	Publicity and Information
