= Chief Minister of Tamil Nadu =

Leader of the executive branch of the Government of Tamil Nadu

- Tamiḻnāṭ Mutalamaiccar
- Emblem of Tamil Nadu

- Flag of India

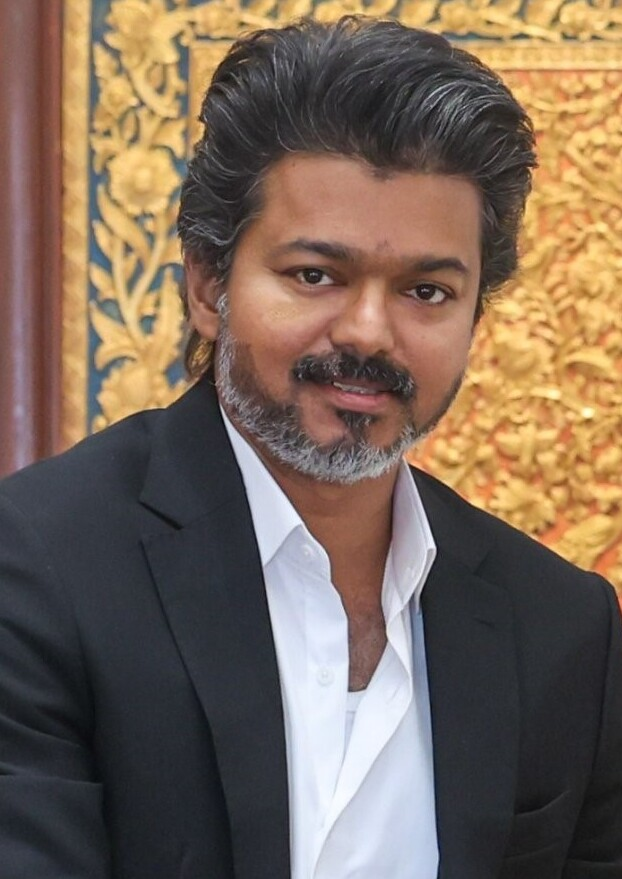
- Incumbent; C. Joseph Vijay since 10 May 2026
- Style: The Honourable
- Type: Head of government
- Abbreviation: CM
- Member of: Tamil Nadu Legislative Assembly; Tamil Nadu Council of Ministers
- Reports to: Governor of Tamil Nadu; Tamil Nadu Legislative Assembly
- Appointer: Governor of Tamil Nadu
- Formation: 10 April 1952; 74 years ago
- First holder: A. Subbarayalu Reddiar (as Chief Minister of the Madras Presidency); P. S. Kumaraswamy Raja (as Chief Minister of Madras State); C. N. Annadurai (as Chief Minister of Tamil Nadu)
- Deputy: Deputy Chief Minister of Tamil Nadu
- Website: tn.gov.in/con_cmsc.php

The chief minister of Tamil Nadu is the head of government of the Indian state of Tamil Nadu. In accordance with the Constitution of India, the governor is a state's de jure head, while the de facto authority rests with the chief minister. Following elections to the Tamil Nadu Legislative Assembly, the state's governor usually invites the party (or coalition) with the majority of seats in the assembly to form the government. The governor appoints the chief minister, whose council of ministers are collectively responsible to the assembly. Given that the chief minister has the confidence of the assembly, the chief minister's term is for five years and is subject to no term limits.

Since 1950, Tamil Nadu has had 14 chief ministers. (Note: Includes V. R. Nedunchezhiyan, who filled in as the chief minister in an acting role twice) The first four chief ministers belonged to the Indian National Congress, of which K. Kamaraj held the post for the longest, for more than nine years. With the rise of Dravidian parties in the state, C. N. Annadurai of the Dravida Munnetra Kazhagam (DMK) became the first non-Congress chief minister in 1969. Annadurai was from the Tamil film industry, and since his tenure, a significant number of the state's chief ministers have hailed from the industry.

M. Karunanidhi of the DMK succeeded Annadurai, and was the longest-serving chief minister, holding the office for nearly nineteen years across five tenures. M. G. Ramachandran of the All India Anna Dravida Munnetra Kazhagam (AIADMK) took office in 1977 and served for nearly a decade across three terms. (Note: The President's Rule was in effect between 7 February and 8 June 1980.) In 1988, V. N. Janaki Ramachandran of the AIADMK became the first woman to hold the position of the state's chief minister. J. Jayalalithaa of the AIADMK became the youngest Chief Minister of Tamil Nadu at the age of 43 in 1991, and had the second longest tenure, holding the office for more than fourteen years across multiple terms.

There have been four instances of President's rule in Tamil Nadu, most recently in 1991. C. Joseph Vijay of the Tamilaga Vettri Kazhagam is the incumbent Chief Minister since 10 May 2026.

== Predecessor ==
The Madras Presidency, based at Fort St. George, was a presidency of India that was established in 1652 by the English East India Company to be the headquarters of the English settlements on the Coromandel Coast.

The territory under the presidency consisted of the village of Madrasapattinam and its surrounding regions. After a series of wars including the Anglo-French wars, Anglo-Mysore wars, and Polygar wars, and the consequent alliance with the Nawab of Arcot, it was expanded to cover the region from the Northern Circars to Cape Comorin, and included present-day Tamil Nadu, the Malabar region of North Kerala, the coastal and Rayalaseema regions of Andhra Pradesh, and the Bellary, Dakshina Kannada, and Udupi districts of Karnataka.

The Indian Councils Act 1861 set up the Madras Legislative Council as an advisory body, without powers, through which the colonial administration obtained advice and assistance from able and willing Indian leaders. However, the members were appointed and not elected by the public. With the enactment of the Government of India Act 1919, the first elected legislature was formed in 1920 after the general elections. The term of the legislative council was three years. It had 132 members, of whom 34 were nominated by the governor and the rest were elected.

As per the Government of India Act 1935, a bicameral legislature was set up with a legislative assembly consisting of 215 members and a legislative council having 56 members. The first legislative assembly under this act was constituted in July 1937. The legislative council was a permanent body, with a third of its members retiring every three years and having the power to decide on bills passed by the assembly.

In 1939, the Governor-General of India declared India's entry into World War II without consulting the Imperial Legislative Council. The Indian National Congress protested by asking all its elected representatives to resign from governments. It was reconstituted after new provincial elections were conducted in 1946. The governance structure also evolved from a modest secretariat with a single secretary for the public department in 1670 to six departments overseen by a chief secretary by 1920.

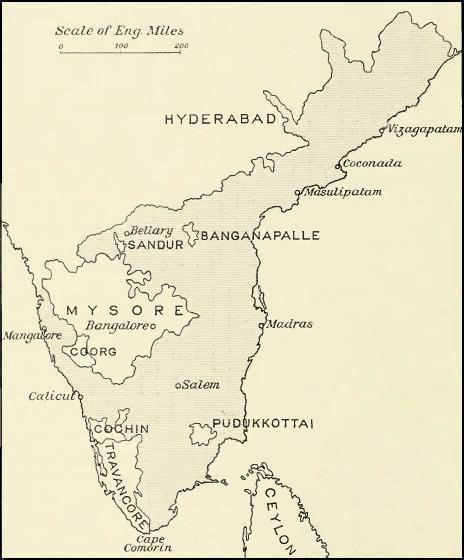
Madras Presidency (1913), the predecessor of modern day Tamil Nadu

Present day Tamil Nadu, which has an electorate of 56.7 million

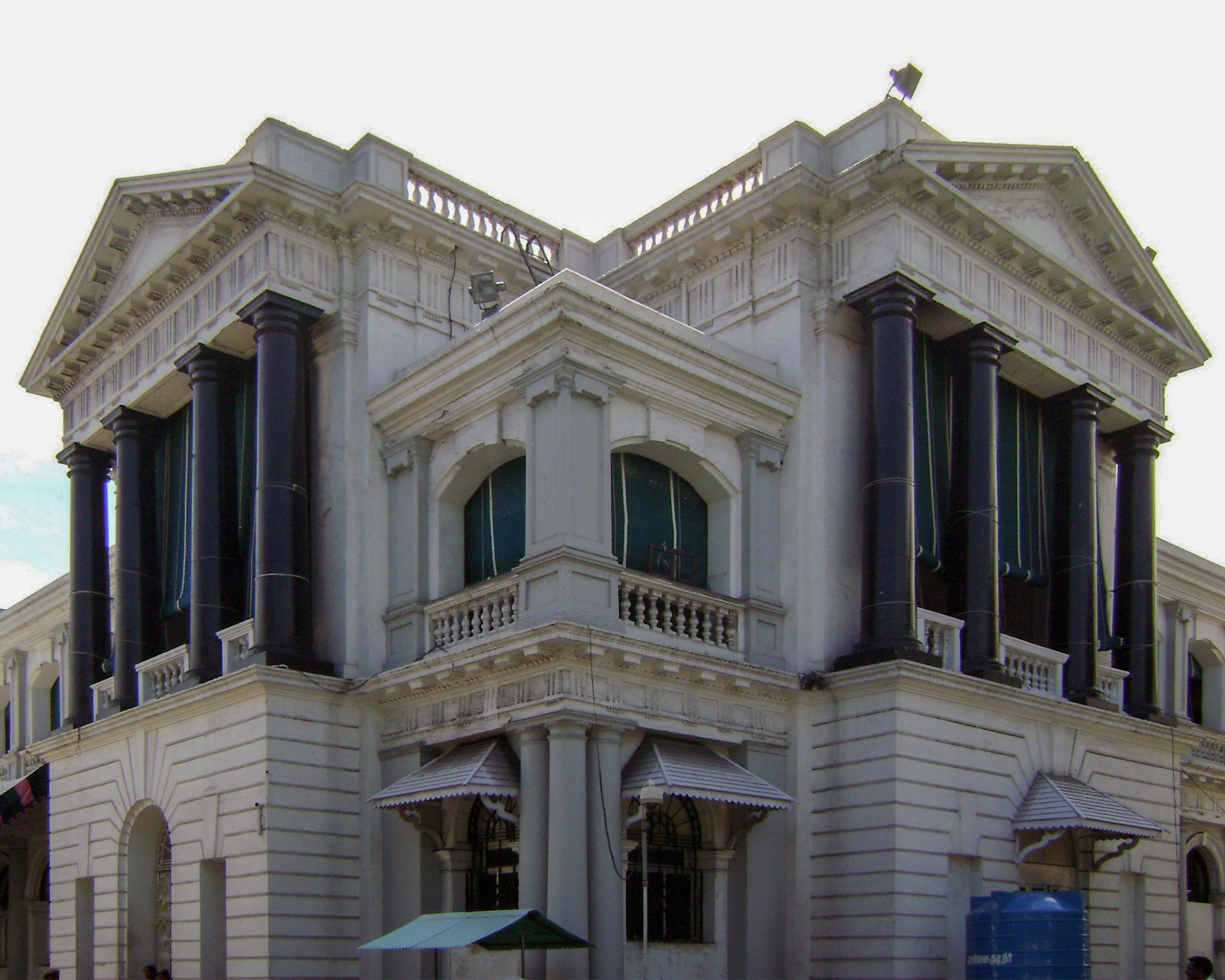
Since 1920, Fort St. George has been the Chief Secretariat of Tamil Nadu

Color key for political parties

- Independent
- Indian National Congress
- South Indian Liberal Federation

Key

- ^{RES} Resigned
- ^{†} Died in office
- ^{§} Returned to office after a previous non-consecutive term

=== First ministers / Premiers of Madras Presidency ===
No.	Portrait	Name (Birth–Death)	Elected constituency	Term of office			Council (Election)	Ministry	Appointed by	Political party (Note: This column only names the chief minister's party. The state government they head may be a complex coalition of several parties and independents; these are not listed here.)
No.	Portrait	Name (Birth–Death)	Elected constituency	Assumed office	Left office	Time in office	Council (Election)	Ministry	Appointed by	Political party
1		A. Subbarayalu Reddiar (1855–1921)	Member of the Legislative Council	17 December 1920	11 July 1921^{[RES]}	206 days	1st (1920)	Reddiar	Frederic Thesiger	South Indian Liberal Federation
2		Panaganti Ramarayaningar (1866–1928)	Member of the Legislative Council	11 July 1921	11 September 1923	5 years, 145 days	1st (1920)	Ramarayaningar I	Rufus Isaacs	South Indian Liberal Federation
2		Panaganti Ramarayaningar (1866–1928)	Member of the Legislative Council	12 September 1923	3 December 1926	5 years, 145 days	2nd (1923)	Ramarayaningar II	Rufus Isaacs	South Indian Liberal Federation
3		P. Subbarayan (1889–1962)	Member of the Legislative Council	4 December 1926	27 October 1930	3 years, 327 days	3rd (1926)	Subbarayan	Edward Wood	Independent
4		B. Munuswamy Naidu (1885–1935)	Member of the Legislative Council	27 October 1930	4 November 1932^{[RES]}	2 years, 8 days	4th (1930)	Naidu	Edward Wood	South Indian Liberal Federation
5		Ramakrishna Ranga Rao (1901–1978)	Member of the Legislative Council	5 November 1932	5 November 1934	3 years, 151 days	4th (1930)	Rao I	Freeman Freeman-Thomas	South Indian Liberal Federation
5		Ramakrishna Ranga Rao (1901–1978)	Member of the Legislative Council	5 November 1934	4 April 1936^{[RES]}	3 years, 151 days	5th (1934)	Rao II	Freeman Freeman-Thomas	South Indian Liberal Federation
6		P. T. Rajan (1892–1974)	Member of the Legislative Council	4 April 1936	24 August 1936^{[RES]}	142 days	5th (1934)	Rajan	Freeman Freeman-Thomas	South Indian Liberal Federation
(5)		Ramakrishna Ranga Rao (1901–1978)	Member of the Legislative Council	24 August 1936^{[§]}	1 April 1937	220 days	5th (1934)	Rao III	Victor Hope	South Indian Liberal Federation
7		Kurma Venkata Reddy Naidu (1875–1942)	Member of the Legislative Council	1 April 1937	14 July 1937^{[RES]}	104 days	1st (1937)	Naidu	Victor Hope	Independent
8		C. Rajagopalachari (1878–1972)	Member of the Legislative Council	14 July 1937	29 October 1939^{[RES]}	2 years, 107 days	1st (1937)	Rajagopalachari I	Victor Hope	Indian National Congress
–		Vacant (Governor-General's rule)	N/A	29 October 1939	29 April 1946	6 years, 182 days	Dissolved	N/A	–	N/A
9		T. Prakasam (1872–1957)	Member of the Legislative Council	30 April 1946	23 March 1947^{[RES]}	327 days	2nd (1946)	Prakasam	Archibald Wavell	Indian National Congress
10		O. P. Ramaswamy Reddiyar (1895–1970)	Member of the Legislative Council	23 March 1947	6 April 1949^{[RES]}	2 years, 14 days	2nd (1946)	Reddiyar	Archibald Nye	Indian National Congress
11		P. S. Kumaraswamy Raja (1898–1957)	Member of the Legislative Council	6 April 1949	25 January 1950	294 days	2nd (1946)	Raja	Krishna Kumarsinhji Bhavsinhji	Indian National Congress

=== Development after independence ===
Madras State, the precursor to the present-day state of Tamil Nadu, was created after India became a republic on 26 January 1950. It consisted of present-day Tamil Nadu and parts of present-day Andhra Pradesh, Karnataka, and Kerala. The first legislature of the Madras State to be elected on the basis of universal suffrage was constituted on 1 March 1952, after the general elections held in January 1952.

The state was split up along linguistic lines in 1953, carving out Andhra State. Under the States Reorganisation Act, 1956, the states of Kerala and Mysore State were carved out of Madras State. Under the Andhra Pradesh and Madras Alteration of Boundaries Act, 1959, with effect from 1 April 1960, Tiruttani taluk and Pallipattu sub-taluk of Chittoor district of Andhra Pradesh were transferred to Madras in exchange for territories from the Chingelput and Salem districts.

== Chief Ministers of Madras State (1950-1969)/ Tamil Nadu (1969-present) ==
Legend

- Acting chief minister

Color key for political parties

- Indian National Congress
- Dravida Munnetra Kazhagam
- All India Anna Dravida Munnetra Kazhagam
- Tamilaga Vettri Kazhagam

Key

- ^{RES} Resigned
- ^{†} Died in office
- ^{§} Returned to office after a previous non-consecutive term

No.	Portrait	Name (Birth–Death)	Elected constituency	Term of office			Assembly (Election)	Ministry	Appointed by	Political party
No.	Portrait	Name (Birth–Death)	Elected constituency	Assumed office	Left office	Time in office	Assembly (Election)	Ministry	Appointed by	Political party
State of Madras (1950–1969)
1		P. S. Kumaraswamy Raja (1898–1957)	MLC	26 January 1950	9 April 1952	2 years, 74 days	2nd (1946)	Raja	Krishna Kumarsinhji Bhavsinhji	INC
2		C. Rajagopalachari (1878–1972)	MLC	10 April 1952	13 April 1954^{[RES]}	2 years, 3 days	1st (1952)	Rajagopalachari II	Sri Prakasa	INC
3		K. Kamaraj (1903–1975)	Gudiyatham	13 April 1954	12 April 1957	9 years, 172 days	1st (1952)	Kamaraj I	Sri Prakasa	INC
3		K. Kamaraj (1903–1975)	Sattur	13 April 1957	14 March 1962	9 years, 172 days	2nd (1957)	Kamaraj II	A. J. John	INC
3		K. Kamaraj (1903–1975)	Sattur	15 March 1962	2 October 1963^{[RES]}	9 years, 172 days	3rd (1962)	Kamaraj III	Bishnu Ram Medhi	INC
4		M. Bhaktavatsalam (1897–1987)	Sriperumbudur	2 October 1963	5 March 1967	3 years, 154 days	3rd (1962)	Bhaktavatsalam	Bishnu Ram Medhi	INC
5		C. N. Annadurai (1909–1969)	MLC	6 March 1967	13 January 1969	1 year, 313 days	4th (1967)	Annadurai	Ujjal Singh	DMK
State of Tamil Nadu (1969–present) (Note: Change in nomenclature During the term of the fourth assembly on 18 July 1967, the house unanimously adopted and recommended that steps be taken by the state government to secure the necessary amendment to the Constitution of India to change the name of Madras State to Tamil Nadu. Accordingly, the Madras State (Alteration of Name) Act, 1968 (Central Act 53 of 1968) was passed by the Parliament of India and came into force on 14 January 1969. Consequently, the nomenclature "Madras Legislative Assembly" was changed to "Tamil Nadu Legislative Assembly". From 1967 onwards, the strength of the assembly continued to remain at 234 plus a nominated member. From 1952 to 1986, the state had a parliamentary system of government with two democratically elected houses, the Legislative Assembly and the Legislative Council. On 14 May 1986, the state government passed a resolution to abolish the legislative council in the state, which was then moved and adopted by the house. On 1 November 1986, Tamil Nadu became a state with a unicameral legislature, and since then, several times, the state government has taken steps to reconstitute the legislative council, but they have failed for so long. The Tamil Nadu Legislative Council has not been constituted in the state to date.)
1		C. N. Annadurai (1909–1969)	MLC	14 January 1969	3 February 1969^{[†]}	20 days	4th (1967)	Annadurai	Ujjal Singh	DMK
Acting		V. R. Nedunchezhiyan (1920–2000)	Triplicane	3 February 1969	10 February 1969^{[RES]}	7 days	4th (1967)	Nedunchezhiyan I	Ujjal Singh	DMK
2		M. Karunanidhi (1924–2018)	Saidapet	10 February 1969	14 March 1971	6 years, 355 days	4th (1967)	Karunanidhi I	Ujjal Singh	DMK
2		M. Karunanidhi (1924–2018)	Saidapet	15 March 1971	31 January 1976	6 years, 355 days	5th (1971)	Karunanidhi II	Ujjal Singh	DMK
–		Vacant (President's rule)	N/A	31 January 1976	29 June 1977	1 year, 149 days	Dissolved	N/A	–	N/A
3		M. G. Ramachandran (1917–1987)	Aruppukottai	30 June 1977	17 February 1980	2 years, 232 days	6th (1977)	Ramachandran I	Prabhudas B. Patwari	AIADMK
–		Vacant (President's rule)	N/A	17 February 1980	8 June 1980	112 days	Dissolved	N/A	–	N/A
(3)		M. G. Ramachandran (1917–1987)	Madurai West	9 June 1980^{[§]}	9 February 1985	7 years, 198 days	7th (1980)	Ramachandran II	Prabhudas B. Patwari	AIADMK
(3)		M. G. Ramachandran (1917–1987)	Andipatti	10 February 1985	24 December 1987^{[†]}	7 years, 198 days	8th (1984)	Ramachandran III	S. L. Khurana	AIADMK
Acting		V. R. Nedunchezhiyan (1920–2000)	Athoor	24 December 1987	7 January 1988^{[RES]}	14 days	8th (1984)	Nedunchezhiyan II	S. L. Khurana	AIADMK
4		V. N. Janaki (1923–1996)	did not contest	7 January 1988	30 January 1988	23 days	8th (1984)	Janaki	S. L. Khurana	AIADMK
–		Vacant (President's rule)	N/A	30 January 1988	26 January 1989	362 days	Dissolved	N/A	–	N/A
(2)		M. Karunanidhi (1924–2018)	Harbour	27 January 1989^{[§]}	30 January 1991	2 years, 3 days	9th (1989)	Karunanidhi III	P. C. Alexander	DMK
–		Vacant (President's rule)	N/A	30 January 1991	23 June 1991	144 days	Dissolved	N/A	–	N/A
5		J. Jayalalithaa (1948–2016)	Bargur	24 June 1991	12 May 1996	4 years, 323 days	10th (1991)	Jayalalithaa I	Bhishma Narain Singh	AIADMK
(2)		M. Karunanidhi (1924–2018)	Chepauk	13 May 1996^{[§]}	13 May 2001	5 years	11th (1996)	Karunanidhi IV	Marri Chenna Reddy	DMK
(5)		J. Jayalalithaa (1948–2016)	did not contest	14 May 2001^{[§]}	21 September 2001^{[RES]}	130 days	12th (2001)	Jayalalithaa II	Fathima Beevi	AIADMK
6		O. Panneerselvam (b. 1951)	Periyakulam	21 September 2001	2 March 2002^{[RES]}	162 days	12th (2001)	Panneerselvam I	C. Rangarajan	AIADMK
(5)		J. Jayalalithaa (1948–2016)	Andipatti	2 March 2002^{[§]}	12 May 2006	4 years, 71 days	12th (2001)	Jayalalithaa III	P. S. Ramamohan Rao	AIADMK
(2)		M. Karunanidhi (1924–2018)	Chepauk	13 May 2006^{[§]}	15 May 2011	5 years, 2 days	13th (2006)	Karunanidhi V	Surjit Singh Barnala	DMK
(5)		J. Jayalalithaa (1948–2016)	Srirangam	16 May 2011^{[§]}	27 September 2014	3 years, 134 days	14th (2011)	Jayalalithaa IV	Surjit Singh Barnala	AIADMK
(6)		O. Panneerselvam (b. 1951)	Bodinayakanur	28 September 2014^{[§]}	23 May 2015^{[RES]}	237 days	14th (2011)	Panneerselvam II	Konijeti Rosaiah	AIADMK
(5)		J. Jayalalithaa (1948–2016)	Dr. Radhakrishnan Nagar	23 May 2015^{[§]}	22 May 2016	1 year, 196 days	14th (2011)	Jayalalithaa V	Konijeti Rosaiah	AIADMK
(5)		J. Jayalalithaa (1948–2016)	Dr. Radhakrishnan Nagar	23 May 2016	5 December 2016^{[†]}	1 year, 196 days	15th (2016)	Jayalalithaa VI	Konijeti Rosaiah	AIADMK
(6)		O. Panneerselvam (b. 1951)	Bodinayakanur	6 December 2016^{[§]}	15 February 2017^{[RES]}	72 days	15th (2016)	Panneerselvam III	C. Vidyasagar Rao	AIADMK
7		Edappadi K. Palaniswami (b. 1954)	Edappadi	16 February 2017	6 May 2021	4 years, 79 days	15th (2016)	Palaniswami	C. Vidyasagar Rao	AIADMK
8		M. K. Stalin (b. 1953)	Kolathur	7 May 2021	9 May 2026	5 years, 2 days	16th (2021)	Stalin	Banwarilal Purohit	DMK
9		C. Joseph Vijay (b. 1974)	Perambur	10 May 2026	Incumbent	179 days	17th (2026)	Vijay	Rajendra Arlekar	TVK

Timeline

== Statistics ==
List of chief ministers by length of term

No.	Name	Party	Length of term	
No.	Name	Party	Longest continuous term	Total duration of the chief ministership
1	M. Karunanidhi	DMK	6 years, 355 days	18 years, 360 days
2	J. Jayalalithaa	AIADMK	4 years, 323 days	14 years, 124 days
3	M. G. Ramachandran	AIADMK	7 years, 198 days	10 years, 65 days
4	K. Kamaraj	INC	9 years, 172 days	9 years, 172 days
5	M. K. Stalin	DMK	5 years, 2 days	5 years, 2 days
6	Edappadi K. Palaniswami	AIADMK	4 years, 79 days	4 years, 79 days
7	M. Bhakthavatsalam	INC	3 years, 154 days	3 years, 154 days
8	P. S. Kumaraswamy Raja	INC	2 years, 74 days	2 years, 74 days
9	C. Rajagopalachari	INC	2 years, 3 days	2 years, 3 days
10	C. N. Annadurai	DMK	1 year, 334 days	1 year, 334 days
11	O. Panneerselvam	AIADMK	237 days	1 year, 106 days
12	C. Joseph Vijay	TVK	179 days	179 days
13	V. N. Janaki Ramachandran	AIADMK	23 days	23 days
Acting	V. R. Nedunchezhiyan	AIADMK/DMK	14 days	21 days

List by party

Parties by total time-span of their member holding CMO (5 November 2026)
No.	Political party	Number of chief ministers	Total days of holding CMO
1	All India Anna Dravida Munnetra Kazhagam	5 (+1 acting)	11004 days
2	Dravida Munnetra Kazhagam	3 (+1 acting)	9468 days
3	Indian National Congress	4	6247 days
4	Tamilaga Vettri Kazhagam	1	179 days

Parties by total duration (in days) of holding Chief Minister's Office

- AIADMK
- DMK
- INC
- TVK

== See also ==
- Elections in Tamil Nadu
- History of Tamil Nadu
- List of current Indian chief ministers
- List of leaders of the house in the Tamil Nadu Legislative Assembly
- List of leaders of the opposition in the Tamil Nadu Legislative Assembly
- List of speakers of the Tamil Nadu Legislative Assembly
- Politics of Tamil Nadu
