= First Nedunchezhiyan ministry =

Government of Tamil Nadu, India in 1969

- Interim Ministry of Tamil Nadu
- Date formed: 3 February 1969
- Date dissolved: 10 February 1969

People and organisations
- Opposition party: INC
- Opposition leader: P. G. Karuthiruman (assembly)

History
- Election: 1967
- Legislature term: 5 Years
- Predecessor: Annadurai ministry
- Successor: First Karunanidhi ministry

After the demise of Tamil Nadu Chief Minister C. N. Annadurai in 1969, the Council of Ministers headed by him was dissolved and the Governor appointed V. R. Nedunchezhiyan, the senior most member of the Council of Ministers to act as the Chief Minister till the election of a new leader by the party. He resigned after M. Karunanidhi was elected as party leader, dissolving the ministry.

== Cabinet ministers ==
S.no	Name	Designation	Party
Chief Minister
1.	DR. V. R. NEDUNCHEZHIYAN	Chief Minister	DMK
Cabinet Ministers
2.	M. KARUNANIDHI	Minister for Public Works	DMK
3.	K A. MATHIALAGAN	Minister for Food and Revenue	DMK
4.	A. GOVINDASWAMY	Minister for Agriculture	DMK
5.	SATYAVANIMUTHU	Minister for Harijan Welfare and Information	DMK
6.	S. MADHAVAN	Minister for Law and Co-operation	DMK
7.	S. J. SADIQ PASHA	Minister for Public Health	DMK
8.	M. MUTHUSWAMY	Minister for Local Administration	DMK
