= 4th Madras State Assembly =

1967–1971 Indian state assembly

The fourth legislative assembly of Madras state (3 March 1967 – 5 January 1971) was constituted in March 1967 after the assembly election which was held in February 1967. The assembly was the first non-Indian National Congress government of the state and, under chief-minister C.N. Annadurai, passed several key acts including the renaming of the state to Tamil Nadu and the abolition of the three-language formula in the state which had previously required Hindi to be taught in schools.

== Overview ==
The assembly was elected in the general election of February 1967 and consisted of 234 members including 42 members representing scheduled castes, two members representing scheduled tribes and one nominated member. In that election, Dravida Munnetra Kazhagam, under the leadership of C.N. Annadurai, won a majority. Annadurai was elected Chief minister as a member of the Legislative Council, the State's upper house. On 18 July 1967, the assembly unanimously adopted a resolution to change the name of Madras State to Tamil Nadu. This was achieved through the Madras State (Alteration of Name) Act, 1968 (Central Act 53 of 1968) which was passed by the Parliament of India and came into force on 14 January 1969, with the assembly being renamed the Tamil Nadu Legislative Assembly. After the death of C. N. Annadurai in office, M. Karunanidhi became Chief Minister in 1969.

This assembly marked the most dramatic change in Madras State politics with the first state-government by the DMK party. Since this assembly the previously dominant Indian National Congress has never returned to power in the state.

=== Significant achievements ===
During the tenure of C. N. Annadurai the assembly passed several key acts. Self-respect marriages, those not requiring the presence of a priest, were legalized through the Hindu Marriage (Madras Amendment) Act, 1967 which was introduced and passed during this assembly. In addition the three-language formula was scrapped and replaced by a "two-language" former in which "Hindi was eliminated from the curriculum, only English and Tamil were to be taught". Other measures included the sale of rice at a fixed price in the suburbs of Chennai and the sponsoring of research into the Tamil poem Tirukkuṛaḷ at Madras State universities.

Position	Leader
Governor	Sardar Ujjal Singh
Chief Minister	C.N. Annadurai
Speaker	S. P. Adithanar; Pulavar K. Govindan
Deputy Speaker	Pulavar K. Govindan; G.R. Edmund
Leader of the House	V. R. Nedunchezhiyan (6.3.1967-10.2.1969) M. Karunanidhi (3.2.1969-13.8.1969) V. R. Nedunchezhiyan (14.8.1969-5.1.1971)
Leader of Opposition	P. G. Karuthiruman

== Annadurai's Cabinet ==
The council of ministers in C. N. Annadurai's cabinet (6 March 1967 – 10 February 1969).

Minister	Portfolios
C.N. Annadurai	Chief Minister, General Administration, Finance, Civil services, Planning, Police, Prohibition, Overseas Indians, Refugees and Evacuees
V. R. Nedunchezhiyan	Education, Industries, Official Language, Textiles, Yarn, Handlooms, Mines and Minerals, Electricity, Iron and Steel, Companies and Religious Endowments
M. Karunanidhi	Public Works, Highways, Transport, Ports and Minor Irrigation
K. A. Mathialagan	Food, Revenue and Commercial Taxes
A. Govindasamy	Agriculture, Animal Husbandry, Fisheries, Forests and Chinchona
S. J. Sadiq Pasha	Public Health
Satyavani Muthu	Harijan Welfare and Information
M. Muthuswamy	Local Administration, Community Development, Khadi and Village Industries, Bhoodan and Gramdhan, Ex-servicemen
S. Madhavan	Law, Co-operation and Housing
N. V. Natarajan	Labour

== Karunanidhi's cabinet ==
The council of ministers in Karunanidhi's cabinet (10 February 1969 – 4 January 1971).

Minister	Portfolios
M. Karunanidhi	Chief Minister, Finance (1970–71)
V. R. Nedunchezhiyan	Education, Health
K. A. Mathialagan	Finance (1969–70)
K. Vezhavendan	Labour
S. J. Sadiq Pasha	Public works
Satyavani Muthu	Agriculture, Harijan Welfare
M. Muthuswamy	Local Administration
S. Madhavan	Industries
O. P. Raman	Electricity
P. U. Shanmugam	Food, Commercial Taxes
S. P. Adithanar	Co-operation
K. V. Subbiah	Religious Endowments

Changes

- S. P. Adithanar who step down as Speaker of the Assembly and became Minister of Co-operation.

== See also ==
- 1967 Madras State legislative assembly election
