= Controversy over arrests in Tamil Nadu about construction of flyovers =

Karunanidhi being arrested in 2001

On 30 June 2001, M. Karunanidhi, the former chief minister of Tamil Nadu was arrested along with the minister of commerce and industry, Murasoli Maran, and the minister of environment and forests, T. R. Baalu. This event marked the first incident in the history of independent India in which ministers of the Republic of India were arrested. The incident began when the seventy-eight-year-old former chief minister was forcibly taken from his residence located in Gopalapuram, Chennai. Within hours, the images of the arrest were broadcast on Sun TV and other network stations. Footage shown on Jaya TV shows him continuously resisting arrest.

== Background ==
The First Information Report (FIR) was based on a complaint lodged by Greater Chennai Corporation (back then just Chennai Corporation) Commissioner J. C. T. Acharyalu on 29 June 2001. Mr. Acharyalu became Corporation Commissioner following the 2001 Tamil Nadu Legislative Assembly election held by the Jayalalithaa Government. He had been kept under suspension by the Karunanidhi Government. The complaint related to alleged losses of ₹12 crore (equivalent to ₹52 crore or US$5.6 million in 2026) in the construction of the mini-flyovers in the city of Chennai. The police complaint was lodged on Friday, 29 June at 9:00 pm, and the arrest took place a few hours after midnight. Because there was, allegedly, little time to conduct an investigation, then Union Law Minister Arun Jaitley wrote that "the initial impression appears to be that personal agenda is being given preference over the rule of the law ."

== Arrest ==
Reports indicate that at 1:30 am on 30 June, Karunanidhi was asleep in the upstairs bedroom of his home when the police broke open the door and asked Karunanidhi to get dressed. The police cut the telephone lines to the house. A television clip showed Karunanidhi falling down and being shoved, pushed, beaten and lifted by police officers in the house. Murasoli Maran, who went to rescue him, was also attacked and arrested when he resisted the arrest of the former chief minister. Murasoli Maran, who was sick from his heart with a pacemaker, was admitted to Apollo Hospital after his arrest. T. R. Baalu and thousands of DMK cadres were arrested. M. K. Stalin, Karunanidhi's third son surrendered before a Magistrate. Prime Minister Atal Bihari Vajpayee condemned the arrest and demanded a report from Chief Secretary and Governor of Tamil Nadu. The arrest was condemned by many groups across the political spectrum including both human rights groups and the Indian National Congress.

=== Court finds fault with the arrest ===
The court found several faults with the police's handling of the situation:

1. A judge found fault with Chennai Corporation Commissioner Acharyalu for making a hasty complaint. They alleged that because Acharyalu had been appointed to his post only a week earlier, he could not have known what had happened between 1998 and 2000. At that time a traffic improvement committee and a high-level steering committee were set up to ease traffic and the construction of flyovers was given to contractors. He could not have known how the accused received financial benefits.
2. Acharyalu made the complaint directly to CB-CID and not through the chief secretary, as is the normal procedure.
3. Acharyalu had not consulted the engineers nor council members involved in the project before making a complaint.
4. The judge wanted the Special Public Prosecutor, Mr. A. Raghunathan, to pinpoint who was the main accused. To the surprise of the judge, Mr. A. Raghunathan could not pinpoint the main accused.
5. The judge criticized the fact that no investigation was done apart from Acharyalu's complaint and a few files with the corporation.
6. The Judge disapproved of the manner in which the complaint was made, the FIR registered and the arrests carried out.
7. Investigating officer, P. Padmanabhan, said that none of the accused (including Karunanidhi and the other 14), received any pecuniary benefits. This raised questions about the motive of the FIR.
8. The judge was surprised that the main accused could not be pinpointed; that the accused received no benefit; and that no investigation was done prior to the arrest, all leading to his questioning the motive of the arrest.
9. The judge further noted that the way the complaint was lodged and FIR registered without examining witnesses shows that the only motive was to arrest some people. The judge suggested that this was an abuse of power.
10. The court wondered why, in a normal corruption case, a First Information Report would be filed, the case investigated, a charge sheet would be made and a court would decide whether to give bail to the accused or not. In this case, the FIR was filed at night and arrests were made at midnight. The accused were those leaders who were not likely to abscond. The court asked why these procedures were not followed.

== Charge sheet ==
The charge-sheet was filed only after 4 years, in 2005. This raised questions as to the conduct of the government.
