= Dravida Munnetra Kazhagam =

Political party in India

- Abbreviation: DMK
- President: M. K. Stalin
- General Secretary: Durai Murugan
- Parliamentary Chairperson: Kanimozhi Rajathi Karunanidhi
- Rajya Sabha Leader: Tiruchi Siva
- Lok Sabha Leader: T. R. Baalu
- Treasurer: T. R. Baalu
- Founder: C. N. Annadurai
- Founded: 17 September 1949 (77 years ago)
- Split from: Dravidar Kazhagam
- Preceded by: Justice Party (1916–1944); Dravidar Kazhagam (1944–1949)
- Headquarters: Anna Arivalayam, 367–369, Anna Salai, Teynampet, Chennai - 600018, Tamil Nadu, India
- Student wing: Maanavar Ani
- Youth wing: Ilaignar Ani
- Women's wing: Magalir Ani
- Labour wing: Labour Progressive Federation (LPF)
- Ideology: Dravidianism Tamil nationalism; Regionalism; Social democracy Progressivism; Secularism
- Political position: Centre-left
- ECI status: State Party
- Alliance: SPA (Tamil Nadu and Puducherry) Former Alliances: INDIA (2023–2026); UPA (2004–2013, 2016–2023) (till dissolved) (National); Democratic Progressive Alliance (2006–2019); DMK-led Alliance (1967–2006) (till dissolved) (Tamil Nadu); INC-DMK alliance (1971–1974; 1980–1983) (Tamil Nadu); Janata Alliance (1977–1980; 1984–1989) (Tamil Nadu); NDA (1999–2003) (India); National Front (1989–1991) (India); United Front (1996–1998) (India)
- Seats in Rajya Sabha: 8 / 245
- Seats in Lok Sabha: 22 / 543
- Seats in Tamil Nadu Legislative Assembly: 59 / 234
- Seats in Puducherry Legislative Assembly: 5 / 30
- Number of states and union territories in government: 0 / 31

Election symbol
- Rising Sun

Party flag

Website
- www.dmk.in

The Dravida Munnetra Kazhagam (DMK; Tamil pronunciation: [t̪iɾaːʋiɖɐ munːeːtrɐk kɐɻɐɡɐm]; transl. Dravidian Progressive Federation) is an Indian regional political party based in the state of Tamil Nadu and the union territory of Puducherry. It is currently the main opposition in the Tamil Nadu Legislative Assembly.

The DMK was founded on 17 September 1949 by C. N. Annadurai as a breakaway faction from the Dravidar Kazhagam, headed by Periyar. The DMK was headed by Annadurai as the general secretary from 1949 until his death on 4 February 1969. He also served as the chief minister of Tamil Nadu from 1967 to 1969. Under Annadurai, in 1967 the DMK became the first party other than the Indian National Congress to win state-level elections with a clear majority on its own in India. M. Karunanidhi followed Annadurai as the first president of the party from 1969 until his death on 7 August 2018. He also served as the chief minister for five non-consecutive terms, in two of which he was dismissed by the Union government. After Karunanidhi's death, his son and former deputy, M. K. Stalin, succeeded as the party president and as a chief minister of Tamil Nadu from May 2021.

The DMK became the fifth-largest party in the Lok Sabha after the 2024 Indian general election. It currently holds 59 seats in the Tamil Nadu Legislative Assembly, where the DMK-led Secular Progressive Alliance holds 73 out of 234 seats.

== History ==
=== Origins and foundation ===
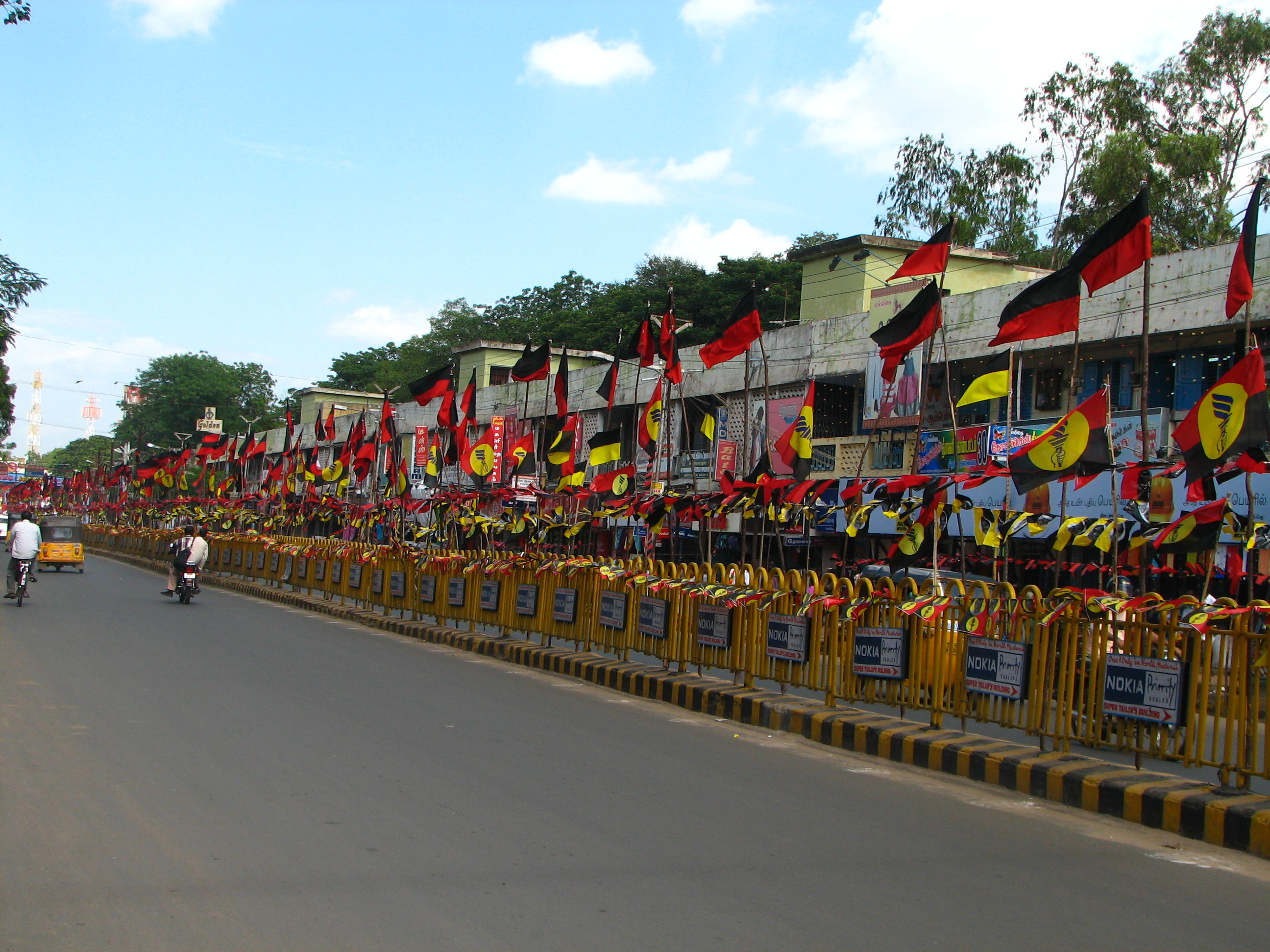
Party flags in Madurai, Tamil Nadu

DMK traces its roots to the Justice Party founded by C. Natesa Mudaliar in 1916, in the presence of P. Theagaraya Chetty, P. T. Rajan, T. M. Nair, Arcot Ramasamy Mudaliar and a few others in Victoria Public Hall Madras Presidency. The Justice Party, whose objectives included social equality and justice, came to power in the first general elections to the Madras Presidency in 1920. Communal division between Brahmins and non-Brahmins began in the presidency during the late-19th and early-20th century, mainly due to caste prejudices and disproportionate Brahminical representation in government jobs. The Justice Party's foundation marked the culmination of several efforts to establish an organization to represent the non-Brahmins in Madras and is seen as the start of the Dravidian movement. In 1935, Periyar, a popular reformist leader at that time, joined the Justice Party.

In the 1937 elections, the Justice Party lost and the Indian National Congress under C. Rajagopalachari (Rajaji) came to power in Madras Presidency. Rajaji's introduction of Hindi as a compulsory subject in schools led to the anti-Hindi agitations, led by Periyar and his associates.

In August 1944, Periyar created the 'Dravidar Kazhagam' (DK) movement out of the Justice Party and the Self-Respect Movement at the Salem Provincial Conference. The DK, conceived as a movement and not a political party, insisted on an independent nation for Dravidians called Dravida Nadu consisting of areas that were covered under the Madras Presidency.

Over the years, many disagreements arose between Periyar and his followers. In 1949, C. N. Annadurai and other members decided to take part in electoral politics and Periyar had strong objection on it. Annadurai and several of his followers decided to split from the DK movement and form the DMK.

The Dravidian philosophy played a key role in the DMK at the helm of administration. It was described it as the earliest subaltern movement in the history of the Indian subcontinent politics to have political representation from former lower castes. This led to greater political participation, which improved representation of the emergent strata, enriched civic life, and subsequently strengthened pluralist democracy in the region.

=== C. N. Annadurai era (1949–1969) ===
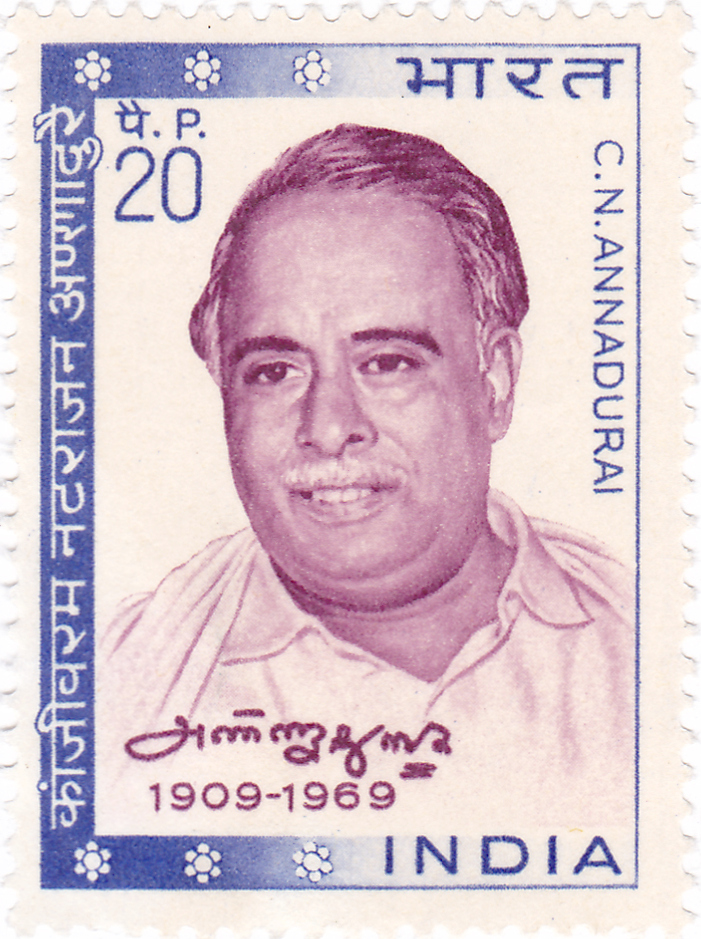
Dr. C.N. Annadurai
Founder of the party

The DMK's initial participation in electoral politics, in the 1957 legislative assembly elections, was mixed. While it won 15 seats, many prominent leaders such as V. R. Nedunchezhiyan were defeated. It fared somewhat better in the 1962 elections, winning 50 seats and becoming the main opposition party by founder annadurai lost his seat.

==== Anti-Hindi Imposition agitations ====
The DMK inherited the anti-Hindi imposition policies of its parent organization, DK. Founder C.N. Annadurai had earlier participated in the anti-Hindi imposition agitations during 1938–40 and throughout the 1940s.

In July 1953, the DMK launched an agitation against the Union government's proposed name-change of Kallakudi to Dalmiapuram. They claimed that the town's proposed new name, proposed to be named after Ramkrishna Dalmia, symbolized the exploitation of South India by the North. On 15 July, M. Karunanidhi and other DMK members removed the Hindi name from Dalmiapuram railway station's name board and protested on the tracks. In the altercation with the police that followed the protests, two DMK members lost their lives, and several others, including Karunanidhi and Kannadasan, were arrested.

The DMK continued its anti-Hindi Imposition policies throughout the 1950s, along with the secessionist demand for Dravida Nadu, which initially adopted a more radical stance than the Dravida Kazhagam. On 28 January 1956, Annadurai, along with Periyar and Rajaji, signed a resolution passed by the Academy of Tamil Culture endorsing the continuation of English as the official language. On 21 September 1957, the DMK convened an anti-Hindi conference to protest against the imposition of Hindi. It observed 13 October 1957 as "anti-Hindi day".

On 31 July 1960, another open-air anti-Hindi conference was held in Kodambakkam, Madras. In November 1963, DMK dropped its secessionist demand in the wake of the Sino-Indian War and the passage of the anti-secessionist 16th Amendment to the Indian Constitution. The anti-Hindi stance remained and hardened with the passage of Official Languages Act of 1963. The DMK's view on Hindi's eligibility for official language status were reflected in Annadurai's response to the "numerical superiority of Hindi" argument: "If we had to accept the principle of numerical superiority while selecting our national bird, the choice would have fallen not on the peacock but on the common crow."

==== Formation of state government ====
In the 1967 assembly election, DMK came to power in the Madras State, 18 years after its formation and 10 years after it had first entered electoral politics. This began the Dravidian era in the Madras province, which later became Tamil Nadu. In 1967, the Congress lost nine states to opposition parties, but it was only in Madras that a single non-Congress Party won a majority. The electoral victory of 1967 is also reputed to be an electoral fusion among the non-Congress parties to avoid a split in the opposition votes. Rajagopalachari, a former senior leader of the Congress Party, had by then left the Congress and launched the right-wing Swatantra Party. He played a vital role in bringing about the electoral fusion amongst the opposition parties to align against the Congress. Following the DMK's victory in the 1967 election, Annadurai formed a cabinet that was the youngest in India at the time.

==== Other achievements ====
Self-respect marriages were legalized in India during Annadurai's tenure. Such marriages did not involve priests presiding over the ceremonies, and thus a Brahmin was not needed to carry out the wedding. Self-respect marriages were a brainchild of Periyar, who regarded the then conventional marriages as mere financial arrangements which led to great debt through dowry in many cases. Self-respect marriages, according to him, encouraged inter-caste marriages and caused arranged marriages to be replaced by love marriages.

Annadurai's party was among the first in India to include a promise of subsidized rice in its election manifesto. He promised one rupee a measure of rice, which he initially implemented once in government, but had to withdraw later. Subsidizing rice costs are still used as an election promise in Tamil Nadu.

It was Annadurai's government that renamed Madras State to Tamil Nadu, its present-day name. The name change itself was first presented in the Rajya Sabha by Bhupesh Gupta, a communist MP from West Bengal, but was then defeated. With Annadurai as chief minister, the state assembly succeeded in passing the bill renaming the state.

Annadurai's government introduced a two-language policy, favoring Tamil and English over Hindi, which marked a significant shift from the previously proposed three language formula. The three-language formula, which was implemented in the neighboring states of Karnataka, Andhra Pradesh and Kerala, mandated students to study three languages: the regional language, English, and Hindi.

=== M. Karunanidhi era (1969–2018) ===
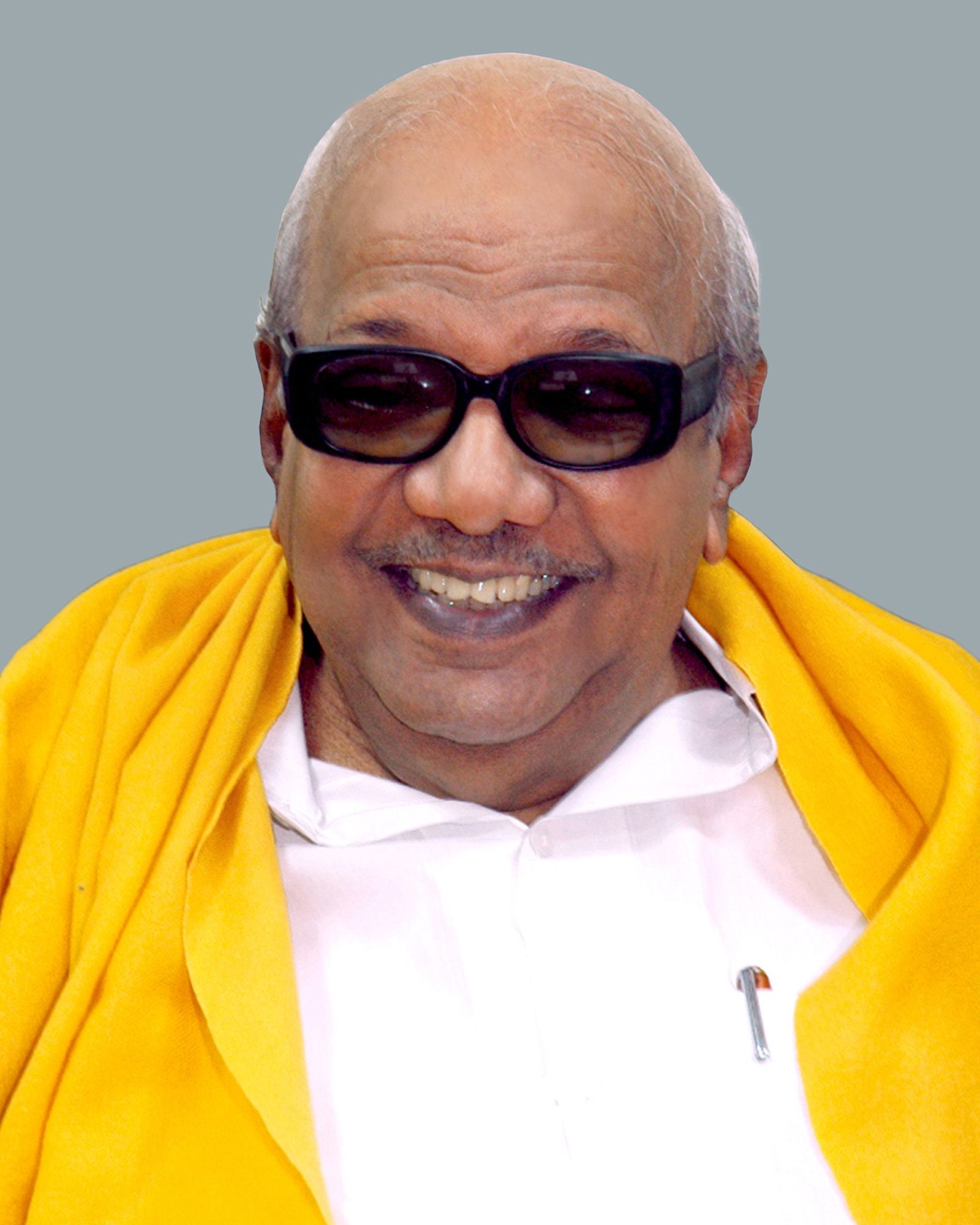
Dr. M. Karunanidhi
Former President of the party

In 1969, after Annadurai's death, M. Karunanidhi was elected as his successor, defeating rival candidate V. R. Nedunchezhiyan. Karunanidhi headed the DMK until his own death in 2018. He was also appointed as the chief minister of Tamil Nadu on 10 February 1969, sworn in by then Governor Sardar Ujjal Singh.

In the 1970s, M. G. Ramachandran (M.G.R.), a popular actor and the party treasurer, had a political feud with the party president Karunanidhi. In 1972, M.G.R. called for a boycott of the party's General Council. The crisis led to a call for a corruption probe by M.G.R. leading to his suspension from the General Council by the high-power committee of DMK. M.G.R. left the DMK and created a new political party, the All India Anna Dravida Munnetra Kazhagam (AIADMK).

In 1976, during the emergency period, prime minister Indira Gandhi dismissed the Karunanidhi government, fifty days before his tenure ended, citing failure to maintain law and order, implement emergency measures, uphold national discipline, and promote economic development. The Sarkaria Commission later investigated the DMK government for alleged irregularities in awarding tenders related to the Veeranam drainage project. However, no corruption charges were formally proven against Karunanidhi in the court.

The interim report of the Jain Commission, which oversaw the investigation into the assassination of Rajiv Gandhi, indicted Karunanidhi for abetting the Liberation Tigers of Tamil Eelam (LTTE). The interim report recommended that Tamil Nadu Chief Minister M. Karunanidhi and the DMK party be held responsible for abetting Rajiv Gandhi's murderers. The final report contained no such allegations.

==== Elections under Karunanidhi's presidency ====
- DMK lost the 1977 Assembly elections to the AIADMK, and stayed out of power in the state until 1989. After MGR's death in December 1987, AIADMK split into two factions led by MGR's wife Janaki and Jayalalithaa. The DMK returned to power in the 1989 state assembly elections and for the third time, Karunanidhi took over as the chief minister in January 1989.
- The 1991 Lok Sabha election was held with the backdrop of DMK government having dissolved within two years of formation due to pressure from ex-Prime Minister Rajiv Gandhi leading an alliance with Samajwadi Janata Party. In the same year, Rajiv Gandhi was killed by a suicide bomber during his election campaign, and due to DMK's pro-Tamil stance and the dismissal of the state government mid-campaign by Rajiv, public sentiments were against DMK and instead in favor of the AIADMK–Congress alliance, causing the DMK to not win any seats in the Parliament.
- In the 1996 state elections, DMK came to power on strength of corruption charges against Jayalalithaa and their alliance with Tamil Maanila Congress (TMC), headed by G.K. Moopanar.
- In 2001, the AIADMK, on strength of a strong alliance and anti-incumbency factor against DMK, came back to power in the state assembly elections.
- In the 2004 general election, DMK formed an alliance with Congress, the Marumalarchi Dravida Munnetra Kazhagam (MDMK), and the Pattali Makkal Katchi (PMK). The alliance won all 40 seats of the state including Puducherry. The DMK held 7 ministerial posts in the central government cabinet.
- Two years later in 2006, the same alliance won in the state assembly elections and the DMK formed a minority government in the state with help from Congress. M Karunanidhi became the Chief Minister of the state for the fifth time. The DMK-Congress alliance was also successful in the 2009 general elections.
- In the 2011 Assembly elections, held in the wake of the 2G case and allegations of nepotism, the DMK won only 23 seats, 127 seats less than earlier.
- In the 2014 general election, DMK failed to win any seats.
- In the 2016 state assembly elections, DMK won 89 seats. This was the most number for a single opposition party in the history of the Tamil Nadu legislative assembly.

==== Favouritism towards family members ====
Karunanidhi has faced accusations and criticism of favouring family members for prominent political and constitutional positions. His supporters have denied these allegations, describing the appointments as based on political trust and experience. Karunanidhi's nephew, Murasoli Maran, was a Union Minister under multiple governments. M. K. Stalin was elected as the Mayor of Chennai and later as the deputy chief minister of Tamil Nadu. Karunanidhi's daughter Kanimozhi has been appointed as the Rajya Sabha MP twice in 2007 and 2013. Karunanidhi's nephew's son Dayanidhi Maran had been appointed as a Union Minister in 2004. Karunanidhi's grandson, M. K. Stalin's son, Udhayanidhi Stalin, has been elected as an MLA in the state assembly. Karunanidhi is also accused of allowing Azhagiri to function as an extraconstitutional authority in Madurai.

=== M. K. Stalin era (2018–present) ===
Karunanidhi died on 7 August 2018, leaving the party in the hands of his son, M. K. Stalin. Stalin had been appointed as the working president in January 2017 when his father's health started declining and had previously been named heir apparent by his father. Stalin thus became the second DMK president since the party's inception.

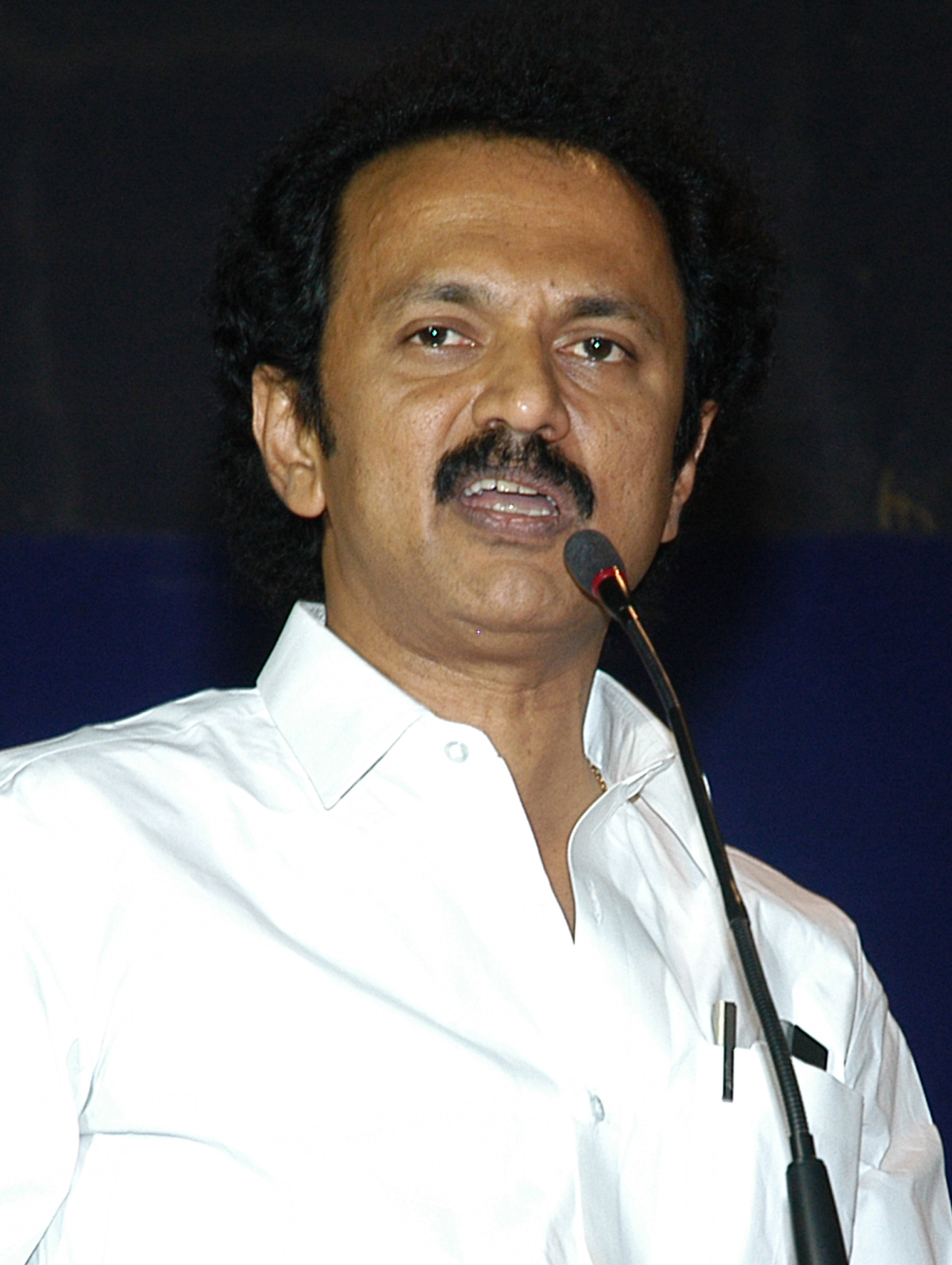
M. K. Stalin
Current President of the party

On 25 March 2018, the DMK held a statewide conference in Erode and M. K. Stalin released five slogans at the conference. They were:

1. Let us keep an eye on the Kalaignar's command
2. Let us grow and admire Tamil
3. Let us crush the power pile
4. Let us protect humanity from extremism
5. Let us grow a prosperous Tamil Nadu

During 2025 end the DMK constituted a committee headed by Kanimozhi, to prepare the manifesto for the 2026 Tamil Nadu Assembly election. MK Stalin launched the party's election manifesto portal on 3 January 2026 at the party headquarters. Over 14,000 suggestions received was received from citizens across the state on the day day one.

==== Elections under M.K. Stalin presidency ====
- In the 2019 general election, DMK contested as part of the United Progressive Alliance led by the Indian National Congress. The alliance secured 38 out of 39 seats in Tamil Nadu with a 52% vote share. and won in Puducherry.
- The DMK-led Secular Progressive alliance secured a majority in the 2019 Tamil Nadu local body elections.
- In the 2021 state assembly election, the Secular Progressive Alliance won a majority by securing 159 seats out of 234 seats with a 46% vote share. Analysts partly attributed the victory to political developments within the AIADMK, including the rise and decline of V.K. Sasikala, and subsequent internal leadership challenges.
- In the 2024 general election, as part of the INDIA Alliance, the DMK contested 21 constituencies. The alliance won all 40 seats in Tamil Nadu and Puducherry, resulting in a clean sweep in the region.

== Party ideology ==
Dravida Munnetra Kazhagam follows the principle of Duty, Dignity, and Discipline, as instructed by C. N. Annadurai. This involves protecting democratic rights in politics, establishing a non-dominant society, and carrying out reform work based on rationality to promote the revival of Dravidian ideology. The party aims to overcome poverty in the economic sphere and provide means for the well-being of all on an equitable basis. The party also aims to develop and promote the respective state languages without allowing other languages to dominate. The party believes in promoting the decentralization of powers from the Union government and creating autonomy in the states and federalism at the center.

=== Dravidian nationalism ===
The anti-Hindi Imposition agitations of 1965 forced the central government to abandon its efforts to use Hindi as the only official language of the country.

=== State autonomy ===
After The Emergency invoked by Indira Gandhi, more state powers like education and medical care were moved from state control to national control. At the state conference in Trichy after the death of Annadurai, Karunanidhi announced the adoption of the "state autonomy" principle to advocate for state self-governance. In April 1974, the DMK government brought in a resolution in the House urging the centre to accept the Rajamannar Committee recommendations on state autonomy and amend the Constitution of India to pave the way for a truly federal system.

=== Social justice ===
The DMK has been involved in the protest for OBC reservation, ensuring the provision legalizing OBC reservation. The party holds OBC welfare as a tenet of its core ideology and has implemented reservation related policies in favour of OBCs and SCs.

The DMK reconstituted the disabled persons welfare board to Differently Abled Persons Departments and changed official terms for transgender individuals to more respectful terms like "Thirunangai" and "Thirunambi".

== Party symbol ==
The party's election symbol is the "sun rising from between two mountains", with a black and red flag pictured. The symbol was inspired by the Karunanidhi's 1950s play Udaya Suryan and is intended to signify the "rising" spirit of the Dravidian people.

In the 1957 poll, the DMK was not recognized by the Election Commission. The party was grouped as independents and was not united by its rising sun symbol and was forced to contest under the rooster symbol.

== Electoral history ==
=== Lok Sabha Elections (Tamil Nadu) ===
| Year | Party Leader | Assembly | Seats contested | Seats won | (+/-) in seats | % of votes | Vote swing | Popular vote | Outcome |
|---|---|---|---|---|---|---|---|---|---|
| 1962 | C. N. Annadurai | 3rd | 18 | 7 / 41 (17%) | New entry | 18.64% | New entry | 23,15,610 | Oppposition |
| 1967 | C. N. Annadurai | 4th | 25 | 25 / 39 (64%) | ▲18 | 35.78% | | 55,24,514 | Oppposition |
| 1971 | M. Karunanidhi | 5th | 24 | 23 / 39 (59%) | ▼2 | 35.25% | | 56,22,758 | Government |
| 1977 | M. Karunanidhi | 6th | 19 | 2 / 39 (5%) | ▼21 | 18.61% | | 33,23,320 | Oppposition |
| 1980 | M. Karunanidhi | 7th | 16 | 16 / 39 (41%) | ▲14 | 23.01% | | 42,36,537 | Government |
| 1984 | M. Karunanidhi | 8th | 27 | 2 / 39 (5%) | ▼14 | 25.90% | | 55,97,507 | Oppposition |
| 1989 | M. Karunanidhi | 9th | 31 | 0 / 39 (0%) | ▼2 | 26.66% | | 70,38,849 | Lost |
| 1991 | M. Karunanidhi | 10th | 29 | 0 / 39 (0%) | Steady | 22.69% | | 56,01,597 | Oppposition |
| 1996 | M. Karunanidhi | 11th | 17 | 17 / 39 (44%) | ▲17 | 25.63% | | 69,67,679 | Government |
| 1998 | M. Karunanidhi | 12th | 17 | 5 / 39 (13%) | ▼12 | 20.08% | | 51,40,266 | Oppposition |
| 1999 | M. Karunanidhi | 13th | 19 | 12 / 39 (31%) | ▲7 | 23.13% | | 62,98,832 | Government |
| 2004 | M. Karunanidhi | 14th | 16 | 16 / 39 (41%) | ▲4 | 24.60% | | 70,64,393 | Government |
| 2009 | M. Karunanidhi | 15th | 22 | 17 / 39 (44%) | ▲1 | 23.90% | | 72,64,923 | Government |
| 2014 | M. Karunanidhi | 16th | 34 | 0 / 39 (0%) | ▼17 | 23.91% | | 95,70,666 | Lost |
| 2019 | M. K. Stalin | 17th | 24 | 24 / 39 (62%) | ▲24 | 33.10% | | 1,43,63,332 | Oppposition |
| 2024 | M. K. Stalin | 18th | 22 | 22 / 39 (56%) | ▼2 | 26.93% | | 1,16,89,879 | Oppposition |

All time–DMK Lok Sabha seat count

=== Tamil Nadu Legislative Assembly elections ===
| Year | Party Leader | Assembly | Seats contested | Seats won | (+/-) in seats | % of votes | Vote swing | Popular vote | Outcome |
|---|---|---|---|---|---|---|---|---|---|
| 1962 | C. N. Annadurai | 3rd | 143 | 50 / 206 (24%) | New entry | 27.10% | New entry | 34,35,633 | Oppposition |
| 1967 | C. N. Annadurai | 4th | 174 | 137 / 234 (59%) | ▲87 | 40.69% | ▲13.59 | 62,30,552 | Government |
| 1971 | M. Karunanidhi | 5th | 203 | 184 / 234 (79%) | ▲47 | 48.58% | ▲7.89 | 76,54,935 | Government |
| 1977 | M. Karunanidhi | 6th | 230 | 48 / 234 (21%) | ▼136 | 24.89% | ▼23.69 | 42,58,771 | Opposition |
| 1980 | M. Karunanidhi | 7th | 112 | 37 / 234 (16%) | ▼11 | 22.10% | ▼2.79 | 41,64,389 | Opposition |
| 1984 | M. Karunanidhi | 8th | 167 | 24 / 234 (10%) | ▼13 | 29.34% | ▲7.24 | 63,62,770 | Opposition |
| 1989 | M. Karunanidhi | 9th | 202 | 150 / 234 (64%) | ▲126 | 33.18% | ▲3.84 | 80,01,222 | Government |
| 1991 | M. Karunanidhi | 10th | 176 | 2 / 234 (0.9%) | ▼148 | 22.46% | ▼10.72 | 55,35,668 | Lost |
| 1996 | M. Karunanidhi | 11th | 182 | 173 / 234 (74%) | ▲171 | 42.07% | ▲19.61 | 1,14,23,380 | Government |
| 2001 | M. Karunanidhi | 12th | 183 | 31 / 234 (13%) | ▼142 | 30.92% | ▼11.15 | 86,69,864 | Opposition |
| 2006 | M. Karunanidhi | 13th | 132 | 96 / 234 (41%) | ▲65 | 26.46% | ▼4.46 | 87,28,716 | Government |
| 2011 | M. Karunanidhi | 14th | 124 | 23 / 234 (10%) | ▼73 | 22.39% | ▼4.07 | 82,49,991 | Lost |
| 2016 | M. Karunanidhi | 15th | 180 | 88 / 234 (38%) | ▲65 | 31.64% | ▲9.25 | 1,36,69,116 | Opposition |
| 2021 | M. K. Stalin | 16th | 188 | 133 / 234 (57%) | ▲45 | 37.70% | ▲6.06 | 1,74,30,179 | Government |
| 2026 | M. K. Stalin | 17th | 176 | 59 / 234 (25%) | ▼74 | 24.19% | ▼13.51 | 1,19,29,144 | Opposition |

All time–DMK Assembly seat count (Tamil Nadu)

=== Puducherry Legislative Assembly Election ===
| Year | Party Leader | Assembly | Seats contested | Seats won | (+/-) in seats | % of votes | Vote swing | Popular vote | Outcome |
|---|---|---|---|---|---|---|---|---|---|
| 1969 | C. N. Annadurai | 3rd | 19 | 15 / 30 (50%) | New entry | 33.70% | New entry | 61,717 | Government |
| 1974 | M. Karunanidhi | 4th | 26 | 2 / 30 (7%) | ▼13 | 21.89% | | 47,823 | Opposition |
| 1977 | M. Karunanidhi | 5th | 26 | 3 / 30 (10%) | ▲1 | 13.49% | | 30,441 | Opposition |
| 1980 | M. Karunanidhi | 6th | 15 | 14 / 30 (47%) | ▲11 | 27.73% | | 68,030 | Government |
| 1985 | M. Karunanidhi | 7th | 22 | 5 / 30 (17%) | ▼9 | 29.08% | | 87,754 | Opposition |
| 1990 | M. Karunanidhi | 8th | 18 | 9 / 30 (30%) | ▲4 | 24.07% | | 1,01,127 | Government |
| 1991 | M. Karunanidhi | 9th | 19 | 4 / 30 (13%) | ▼5 | 24.71% | | 96,607 | Opposition |
| 1996 | M. Karunanidhi | 10th | 18 | 7 / 30 (23%) | ▲3 | 22.90% | | 1,05,392 | Government |
| 2001 | M. Karunanidhi | 11th | 15 | 7 / 30 (23%) | Steady | 17.54% | | 83,679 | Opposition |
| 2006 | M. Karunanidhi | 12th | 11 | 7 / 30 (23%) | Steady | 12.59% | | 71,173 | Opposition |
| 2011 | M. Karunanidhi | 13th | 10 | 2 / 30 (7%) | ▼5 | 10.68% | | 74,552 | Opposition |
| 2016 | M. Karunanidhi | 14th | 9 | 2 / 30 (7%) | Steady | 8.85% | | 70,836 | Government |
| 2021 | M. K. Stalin | 15th | 13 | 6 / 30 (20%) | ▲4 | 18.51% | | 1,54,858 | Opposition |
| 2026 | M. K. Stalin | 16th | 13 | 5 / 30 (17%) | ▼1 | 13.74% | | 1,19,036 | Opposition |

All time–DMK Assembly seat count (Puducherry)

=== Andhra Pradesh Legislative Assembly ===
Andhra Pradesh Legislative Assembly Elections
| Year | Assembly | Party leader | Seats contested | Seats won | Change in seats | Percentage of votes | Vote swing | Popular vote | Outcome |
|---|---|---|---|---|---|---|---|---|---|
| 1972 | 5th | M. Karunanidhi | 3 | 0 / 287 | Steady | 0.26% | Steady | 36,466 | Lost |
| 1978 | 6th | M. Karunanidhi | 2 | 0 / 294 | Steady | 0.03% | ▼0.23% | 6,547 | Lost |

=== Karnataka Legislative Assembly ===
Karnataka Legislative Assembly Elections
| Year | Assembly | Party leader | Seats contested | Seats won | Change in seats | Percentage of votes | Vote swing | Popular vote | Outcome |
|---|---|---|---|---|---|---|---|---|---|
| 1978 | 6th | M. Karunanidhi | 3 | 0 / 224 | Steady | 0.13% | Steady | 16,437 | Lost |

=== Keralam Legislative Assembly ===
Keralam Legislative Assembly Elections
| Year | Assembly | Party leader | Seats contested | Seats won | Change in seats | Percentage of votes | Vote swing | Popular vote | Outcome |
|---|---|---|---|---|---|---|---|---|---|
| 1970 | 4th | M. Karunanidhi | 1 | 0 / 133 | Steady | 0.02% | Steady | 1,682 | Lost |

== Current office bearers and prominent members ==
| Member | Position in Government | Party Position |
|---|---|---|
| M. K. Stalin | Former Chief Minister of Tamil Nadu; Member of the Legislative Assembly from Kolathur; Former Deputy Chief Minister of Tamil Nadu | President |
| Duraimurugan | Former Minister for Water Resources of Tamil Nadu; Former Member of the Legislative Assembly from Katpadi; Former Leader of the House in the Tamil Nadu Legislative Assembly | General Secretary |
| T. R. Baalu | Member of Parliament, Lok Sabha from Sriperumbudur; Former Minister of Shipping of the Republic of India; Former Member of Parliament, Rajya Sabha | Treasurer and Lok Sabha Leader |
| K. N. Nehru | Former Deputy Leader of the Opposition in the Tamil Nadu Legislative Assembly; Member of the Legislative Assembly from Tiruchirappalli West | Party Principal Secretary |
| I. Periyasamy | Former Minister for Rural Administration; MLA from Aathoor | Deputy General Secretary |
| Tiruchi Siva | Leader of Dravida Munnetra Kazhagam in Rajya Sabha; Member of Parliament, Rajya Sabha | Deputy General Secretary |
| A. Raja | Member of Parliament (LS) from Nilgiris; Former Union Minister for Information Technology | Deputy General Secretary |
| Anthiyur P. Selvaraj | Member of Rajya Sabha, Former State Minister for Handlooms and Textile | Deputy General Secretary |
| Kanimozhi Rajathi Karunanidhi | Member of Parliament, Lok Sabha from Thoothukkudi; Former Member of Parliament, Rajya Sabha | Deputy General Secretary and; Parliamentary Chairperson |
| R. S. Bharathi | Former Member of Parliament (RS); Former Chairman of Alandur Municipality | Organization Secretary |
| T. K. S. Elangovan | Former Member of Parliament (RS) | Official Spokesperson |
| Udhayanidhi Stalin | Leader of the Opposition in the Tamil Nadu Legislative Assembly; Former Deputy Chief Minister of Tamil Nadu; Minister for Planning and Development; Minister for Youth Welfare and Sports Development of Tamil Nadu; Member of Legislative Assembly from Chepauk-Thiruvallikeni | Youth Wing Secretary |
| T. R. B. Rajaa | Former Minister for Industries, Investments and Commerce; Former Member of Legislative Assembly from Mannargudi | Information Technology Wing Secretary |
| Helena Davidson | Former Member of Parliament (LS) from Kanniyakumari | Women's Wing Secretary |
| C. V. M. P. Ezhilarasan | Member of Legislative Assembly from Kancheepuram | Students' Wing Secretary |
| Dayanidhi Maran | Member of Parliament (LS) from Central Chennai; Former Union Minister for Information Technology | Sports Wing Secretary |
| Palanivel Thiagarajan | Former Minister for Information Technology and Digital Services; Former Member of Tamil Nadu Legislative Assembly from Madurai Central | Assets Committee Secretary |
| Ezhilan Naganathan | Former Member of Legislative Assembly from Thousand Lights | Medical Wing Secretary |
| M M Abdulla | Member of Parliament (RS) | NRI Wing Secretary |

== List of party leaders ==
=== Presidents ===
| No. | Portrait | Name (Birth–Death) | Term in office | | |
| No. | Portrait | Name (Birth–Death) | Assumed office | Left office | Time in office |
|---|---|---|---|---|---|
| 1 | | M. Karunanidhi (1924–2018) | 27 July 1969 | 7 August 2018 | 49 years, 11 days |
| 2 | The Chief Minister of Tamil Nadu, Thiru MK Stalin | M. K. Stalin (born in 1953) | 28 August 2018 | incumbent | 8 years, 77 days |

=== Working President ===
| No. | Portrait | Name (Birth–Death) | Term in office | | | | | |
|---|---|---|---|---|---|---|---|---|
| No. | Portrait | Name (Birth–Death) | 1 | The Chief Minister of Tamil Nadu, Thiru MK Stalin | M. K. Stalin (born in 1953) | 4 January 2017 | 27 August 2018 | 1 year, 235 days |

=== General Secretaries ===
| No. | Portrait | Name (Birth–Death) | Term in office | | |
| No. | Portrait | Name (Birth–Death) | Assumed office | Left office | Time in office |
|---|---|---|---|---|---|
| 1 | | C. N. Annadurai (1909–1969) | 17 September 1949 | 24 April 1955 | 13 years, 350 days |
| 1 | | C. N. Annadurai (1909–1969) | 25 September 1960 | 3 February 1969 | 13 years, 350 days |
| 2 | | V. R. Nedunchezhiyan (1920–2000) | 24 April 1955 | 24 September 1960 | 13 years, 254 days |
| 2 | | V. R. Nedunchezhiyan (1920–2000) | 4 February 1969 | 16 May 1977 | 13 years, 254 days |
| 3 | | K. Anbazhagan (1922–2020) | 17 May 1977 | 7 March 2020 | 42 years, 295 days |
| 4 | | Duraimurugan (born in 1938) | 9 September 2020 | Incumbent | 6 years, 65 days |

== List of chief ministers ==
=== Chief Minister of Madras State ===
| No. | Portrait | Name (Birth–Death) | Term in office | | | Assembly (Election) | Elected constituency | Ministry |
| No. | Portrait | Name (Birth–Death) | Assumed office | Left office | Time in office | Assembly (Election) | Elected constituency | Ministry |
|---|---|---|---|---|---|---|---|---|
| 1 | | C. N. Annadurai (1909–1969) | 6 March 1967 | 13 January 1969 | 1 year, 313 days | 4th (1967) | Member of the Legislative Council | Annadurai |

=== Chief Ministers of Tamil Nadu ===
| No. | Portrait | Name (Birth–Death) | Term in office | | | Ministry | Constituency | Assembly Election |
| No. | Portrait | Name (Birth–Death) | Start | End | Duration in days | Ministry | Constituency | Assembly Election |
|---|---|---|---|---|---|---|---|---|
| 1 | | C. N. Annadurai (1909–1969) | 14 January 1969 | 3 February 1969 | 20 days | Annadurai | Tamil Nadu Legislative Council | 4th (1967) |
| Acting | | V. R. Nedunchezhiyan (1910–1988) | 3 February 1969 | 10 February 1969 | 7 days | Nedunchezhiyan I | Triplicane | 4th (1967) |
| 2 | | M. Karunanidhi (1924–2018) | 10 February 1969 | 14 March 1971 | 2 years, 32 days | Karunanidhi I | Saidapet | 4th (1967) |
| 2 | | M. Karunanidhi (1924–2018) | 15 March 1971 | 31 January 1976 | 4 years, 322 days | Karunanidhi II | Saidapet | 5th (1971) |
| 2 | | M. Karunanidhi (1924–2018) | 27 January 1989 | 30 January 1991 | 2 years, 3 days | Karunanidhi III | Harbour | 11th (1989) |
| 2 | | M. Karunanidhi (1924–2018) | 13 May 1996 | 13 May 2001 | 5 years, 0 days | Karunanidhi IV | Chepauk | 11th (1996) |
| 2 | | M. Karunanidhi (1924–2018) | 13 May 2006 | 15 May 2011 | 5 years, 2 days | Karunanidhi V | Chepauk | 13th (2006) |
| 3 | The Chief Minister of Tamil Nadu, Thiru MK Stalin | M. K. Stalin (born 1953) | 7 May 2021 | 10 May 2026 | 5 years, 3 days | Stalin | Kolathur | 16th (2021) |

=== List of deputy chief ministers ===
==== Deputy Chief Minister of Tamil Nadu ====
| No. | Portrait | Name (Birth–Death) | Term in office | | | Assembly (Election) | Elected constituency | Chief Minister |
| No. | Portrait | Name (Birth–Death) | Assumed office | Left office | Time in office | Assembly (Election) | Elected constituency | Chief Minister |
|---|---|---|---|---|---|---|---|---|
| 1 | | M. K. Stalin (1953–) | 29 May 2009 | 15 May 2011 | 1 year, 351 days | 13th (2006) | Thousand Lights | M. Karunanidhi |
| 2 | | Udhayanidhi Stalin (1977–) | 28 September 2024 | 10 May 2026 | 1 year, 224 days | 16th (2021) | Chepauk-Thiruvallikeni | M. K. Stalin |

=== Chief Ministers of Puducherry ===
| No. | Portrait | Name (Birth–Death) | Elected constituency | Term of office | | | (Assembly) (Election) | Appointed by (Lieutenant Governor) |
| No. | Portrait | Name (Birth–Death) | Elected constituency | Assumed office | Left office | Time in office | (Assembly) (Election) | Appointed by (Lieutenant Governor) |
|---|---|---|---|---|---|---|---|---|
| 1 | | M. O. H. Farook (1937–2012) | Kalapet | 17 March 1969 | 2 January 1974 | 4 years, 291 days | 3rd (1969 election) | B. D. Jatti |
| 2 | | M. D. R. Ramachandran (1934–2024) | Mannadipet | 16 January 1980 | 23 June 1983 | 3 years, 158 days | 6th (1980 election) | B. T. Kulkarni |
| 3 | | M. D. R. Ramachandran (1934–2024) | Mannadipet | 8 March 1990 | 2 March 1991 | 359 days | 8th (1990 election) | Chandrawati |
| 4 | | R. V. Janakiraman (1941–2019) | Nellithope | 26 May 1996 | 21 March 2000 | 3 years, 300 days | 10th (1996 election) | Rajendra Kumari Bajpai |

== List of Leaders of the Opposition ==
=== Tamil Nadu Legislative Assembly ===
| No. | Portrait | Name (Birth–Death) | Elected constituency | Term of office | | | Assembly (Election) | Appointed by (Speaker) |
| No. | Portrait | Name (Birth–Death) | Elected constituency | Assumed office | Left office | Time in office | Assembly (Election) | Appointed by (Speaker) |
|---|---|---|---|---|---|---|---|---|
| 1 | | M. Karunanidhi (1924–2018) | Anna Nagar | 25 July 1977 | 17 February 1980 | 5 years, 259 days | 6th (1977) | Munu Adhi |
| 1 | | M. Karunanidhi (1924–2018) | Anna Nagar | 27 June 1980 | 18 August 1983 | 5 years, 259 days | 7th (1980) | K. Rajaram |
| 2 | | K. Anbazhagan (1922–2020) | Harbour | 24 May 2001 | 14 April 2006 | 4 years, 325 days | 12th (2001) | K. Kalimuthu |
| 3 | | M. K. Stalin (born 1953) | Kolathur | 4 June 2016 | 3 May 2021 | 4 years, 333 days | 15th (2016) | P. Dhanapal |
| 3 | | Udhayanidhi Stalin (born 1977) | Chepauk-Triplicane | 10 May 2026 | Incumbent | 187 days | 17th (2026) | J. C. D. Prabhakar |} |

=== Pondicherry/Puducherry Legislative Assembly ===
| No. | Portrait | Name (Birth–Death) | Elected constituency | Term of office | | | Assembly ((election)) |
| No. | Portrait | Name (Birth–Death) | Elected constituency | Assumed office | Left office | Time in office | Assembly ((election)) |
|---|---|---|---|---|---|---|---|
| 1 | | R.V. Janakiraman | Nellithope | 22 March 2000 | 15 May 2001 | 1 year, 54 days | 10th (1996 election) |
| 1 | | R.V. Janakiraman | Nellithope | 16 May 2001 | 11 May 2006 | 4 years, 360 days | 11th (2001 election) |
| 2 | | A. M. H. Nazeem | Karaikal | 29 May 2006 | May 2011 | 5 years, 0 days | 12th (2006 election) |
| 3 | | R. Siva | Villianur | 8 May 2021 | Incumbent | 5 years, 189 days | 15th (2021 election) |

=== Madras State Legislative Assembly ===
| Leader of the Opposition | Term Start | Term End | Duration |
|---|---|---|---|
| V. R. Nedunchezhiyan | 29 March 1962 | 28 February 1967 | 4 years, 337 days |

== List of Speakers & Deputy Speakers of the Tamil Nadu Legislative Assembly ==
| No. | Name | Deputy Speaker | Took office | Left office | Duration |
|---|---|---|---|---|---|
| 1 | Pulavar K. Govindan | G. R. Edmund | 22 February 1969 | 14 March 1971 | 2 years, 20 days |
| 1 | Pulavar K. Govindan | N. Ganapathy | 3 August 1973 | 3 July 1977 | 3 years, 334 days |
| 2 | K. A. Mathiazagan | P. Seenivasan | 24 March 1971 | 2 December 1972 | 1 year, 253 days |
| Acting | P. Seenivasan (Acting Speaker) | | 2 December 1972 | 3 August 1973 | 1 year, 172 days |
| 3 | M. Tamilkudimagan | V. P. Duraisamy | 8 February 1989 | 30 June 1991 | 2 years, 172 days |
| 4 | P. T. R. Palanivel Rajan | Parithi Ilamvazhuthi | 23 May 1996 | 21 May 2001 | 4 years, 363 days |
| 5 | R. Avudaiappan | V. P. Duraisamy | 19 May 2006 | 15 May 2011 | 4 years, 361 days |
| 6 | M. Appavu | K. Pitchandi | 12 May 2021 | 11 May 2026 | 4 years, 364 days |

== List of union cabinet ministers ==
=== V. P. Singh ministry (1989–90) ===
| # | Portrait | Minister (Birth-Death) Constituency | Term of office | | | Portfolio | Ministry | Prime Minister |
| # | Portrait | Minister (Birth-Death) Constituency | From | To | Period | Portfolio | Ministry | Prime Minister |
|---|---|---|---|---|---|---|---|---|
| 1 | | Murasoli Maran (1934–2003); MP for Chennai South | 2 December 1989 | 10 November 1990 | 343 days | Minister of Urban Development | Vishwanath | V. P. Singh |

=== H.D Devegowda Ministry (1996–97) ===
| No. | Portrait | Portfolio | Name (Birth–Death) | Term in office | | | Constituency (House) | Prime Minister |
| No. | Portrait | Portfolio | Name (Birth–Death) | Assumed office | Left office | Time in office | Constituency (House) | Prime Minister |
|---|---|---|---|---|---|---|---|---|
| 1 | | Minister of Industry | Murasoli Maran (1934–2003) | 1 June 1996 | 21 April 1997 | 324 days | Chennai Central (Lok Sabha) | H. D. Deve Gowda |
| 2 | | Minister of Surface Transport | T. G. Venkatraman (1931–2013) | 1 June 1996 | 21 April 1997 | 324 days | Tindivanam (Lok Sabha) | H. D. Deve Gowda |
| 3 | | Minister of Defence (MoS) | N. V. N. Somu (–) | 6 July 1996 | 21 April 1997 | 289 days | Chennai North (Lok Sabha) | H. D. Deve Gowda |
| 4 | | Minister of Petroleum & Natural Gas (MoS) | T. R. Baalu (born 1941) | 6 July 1996 | 21 April 1997 | 289 days | Chennai South (Lok Sabha) | H. D. Deve Gowda |

=== I.K Gujral Ministry (1997–98) ===
| No. | Portrait | Portfolio | Name (Birth–Death) | Term in office | | | Constituency (House) | Prime Minister |
| No. | Portrait | Portfolio | Name (Birth–Death) | Assumed office | Left office | Time in office | Constituency (House) | Prime Minister |
|---|---|---|---|---|---|---|---|---|
| 1 | | Minister of Industry | Murasoli Maran (1934–2003) | 21 April 1997 | 19 March 1998 | 332 days | Chennai Central (Lok Sabha) | I. K. Gujral |
| 2 | | Minister of Surface Transport | T. G. Venkatraman (1931–2013) | 21 April 1997 | 19 March 1998 | 332 days | Tindivanam (Lok Sabha) | I. K. Gujral |
| 2 | | Minister of Urban Affairs & Employment | T. G. Venkatraman (1931–2013) | 14 November 1997 | 12 December 1997 | 28 days | Tindivanam (Lok Sabha) | I. K. Gujral |
| 3 | | Minister of Petroleum & Natural Gas (MoS) | T. R. Baalu (born 1941) | 21 April 1997 | 19 March 1998 | 332 days | Chennai South (Lok Sabha) | I. K. Gujral |
| 3 | | Minister of Non-Conventional Energy Sources (MoS) | T. R. Baalu (born 1941) | 11 January 1998 | 19 March 1998 | 67 days | Chennai South (Lok Sabha) | I. K. Gujral |
| 4 | | Minister of Defence (MoS) | N. V. N. Somu (–) | 21 April 1997 | 14 November 1997 (died in office) | 207 days | Chennai North (Lok Sabha) | I. K. Gujral |

=== Third Atal Bihari Vajpayee Ministry (1999–2004) ===
| No. | Portrait | Portfolio | Name (Birth–Death) | Term in office | | | Constituency (House) | Prime Minister |
| No. | Portrait | Portfolio | Name (Birth–Death) | Assumed office | Left office | Time in office | Constituency (House) | Prime Minister |
|---|---|---|---|---|---|---|---|---|
| 1 | | Minister of Commerce & Industry | Murasoli Maran (1934–2003) | 13 October 1999 | 9 November 2002 | 3 years, 27 days | Chennai Central (Lok Sabha) | Atal Bihari Vajpayee |
| 1 | | Minister without portfolio | Murasoli Maran (1934–2003) | 9 November 2002 | 23 November 2003 | 1 year, 14 days | Chennai Central (Lok Sabha) | Atal Bihari Vajpayee |
| 2 | | Minister of Environment & Forests | T. R. Baalu (born 1941) | 13 October 1999 | 21 December 2003 | 4 years, 69 days | Chennai South (Lok Sabha) | Atal Bihari Vajpayee |
| 3 | | Minister of Rural Development (MoS) | A. Raja (born 1963) | 13 October 1999 | 30 September 2001 | 1 year, 352 days | Perambalur (Lok Sabha) | Atal Bihari Vajpayee |
| 3 | | Minister of Health & Family Welfare (MoS) | A. Raja (born 1963) | 30 September 2000 | 21 December 2003 | 3 years, 82 days | Perambalur (Lok Sabha) | Atal Bihari Vajpayee |

=== First Manmohan Singh Ministry (2004–2009) ===
| No. | Portrait | Portfolio | Name (Birth–Death) | Term in office | | | Constituency (House) | Prime Minister |
| No. | Portrait | Portfolio | Name (Birth–Death) | Assumed office | Left office | Time in office | Constituency (House) | Prime Minister |
|---|---|---|---|---|---|---|---|---|
| 1 | | Minister of Environment and Forests | A. Raja (born 1963) | 23 May 2004 | 15 May 2007 | 2 years, 357 days | Perambalur (Lok Sabha) | Manmohan Singh |
| 1 | | Minister of Communications & Information Technology | A. Raja (born 1963) | 15 May 2007 | 22 May 2009 | 2 years, 7 days | Perambalur (Lok Sabha) | Manmohan Singh |
| 2 | | Minister of Communications & Information Technology | Dayanidhi Maran (born 1966) | 23 May 2004 | 15 May 2007 | 2 years, 357 days | Chennai Central (Lok Sabha) | Manmohan Singh |
| 3 | | Minister of Road Transport and Highways | T. R. Baalu (born 1941) | 23 May 2004 | 22 May 2009 | 4 years, 364 days | Chennai South (Lok Sabha) | Manmohan Singh |
| 3 | | Minister of Shipping | T. R. Baalu (born 1941) | 25 May 2004 | 2 September 2004 (Note: The ministry's competences were transferred to the Ministry of Shipping, Road Transport and Highways in September 2004.) | 100 days | Chennai South (Lok Sabha) | Manmohan Singh |
| 4 | | Minister of Law and Justice (MoS) | K. Venkatapathy (born 1946) | 23 May 2004 | 22 May 2009 | 4 years, 364 days | Cuddalore (Lok Sabha) | Manmohan Singh |
| 5 | | Minister of Home Affairs (MoS) | S. Regupathy (born 1950) | 23 May 2004 | 15 May 2007 | 2 years, 357 days | Pudukkottai (Lok Sabha) | Manmohan Singh |
| 5 | | Minister of Environment and Forests (MoS) | S. Regupathy (born 1950) | 15 May 2007 | 22 May 2009 | 2 years, 7 days | Pudukkottai (Lok Sabha) | Manmohan Singh |
| 6 | | Minister of Commerce and Industry (MoS) | S. S. Palanimanickam (born 1950) | 23 May 2004 | 25 May 2004 | 2 days | Thanjavur (Lok Sabha) | Manmohan Singh |
| 6 | | Minister of Finance (Revenue, from 29 January 2006) (MoS) | S. S. Palanimanickam (born 1950) | 25 May 2004 | 22 May 2009 | 4 years, 362 days | Thanjavur (Lok Sabha) | Manmohan Singh |
| 7 | | Minister of Social Justice and Empowerment (MoS) | Subbulakshmi Jagadeesan (born 1947) | 23 May 2004 | 22 May 2009 | 4 years, 364 days | Tiruchengode (Lok Sabha) | Manmohan Singh |
| 8 | | Minister of Home Affairs (MoS) | V. Radhika Selvi (born 1976) | 18 May 2007 | 22 May 2009 | 2 years, 4 days | Tiruchendur (Lok Sabha) | Manmohan Singh |

=== Second Manmohan Singh Ministry (2009–2014) ===
| No. | Portrait | Portfolio | Name (Birth–Death) | Term in office | | | Constituency (House) | Prime Minister |
| No. | Portrait | Portfolio | Name (Birth–Death) | Assumed office | Left office | Time in office | Constituency (House) | Prime Minister |
|---|---|---|---|---|---|---|---|---|
| 1 | | Minister of Communications & Information Technology | A. Raja (born 1963) | 28 May 2009 | 15 November 2010 | 1 year, 171 days | Nilgiris (Lok Sabha) | Manmohan Singh |
| 2 | | Minister of Textiles | Dayanidhi Maran (born 1966) | 28 May 2009 | 12 July 2011 | 2 years, 45 days | Chennai Central (Lok Sabha) | Manmohan Singh |
| 3 | | Minister of Chemicals & Fertilizers | M. K. Alagiri (born 1951) | 28 May 2009 | 21 March 2013 | 3 years, 297 days | Madurai (Lok Sabha) | Manmohan Singh |
| 4 | | Minister of Social Justice and Empowerment (MoS) | D. Napoleon (born 1963) | 28 May 2009 | 21 March 2013 | 3 years, 297 days | Perambalur (Lok Sabha) | Manmohan Singh |
| 5 | | Minister of Health & Family Welfare (MoS) | S. Gandhiselvan (born 1963) | 28 May 2009 | 21 March 2013 | 3 years, 297 days | Namakkal (Lok Sabha) | Manmohan Singh |
| 6 | | Minister of Finance (Revenue) (MoS) | S. S. Palanimanickam (born 1950) | 28 May 2009 | 21 March 2013 | 3 years, 297 days | Thanjavur (Lok Sabha) | Manmohan Singh |
| 7 | | Minister of Information & Broadcasting (MoS) | S. Jagathrakshakan (born 1950) | 28 May 2009 | 28 October 2012 | 3 years, 153 days | Arakkonam (Lok Sabha) | Manmohan Singh |
| 7 | | Minister of New & Renewable Energy (MoS) | S. Jagathrakshakan (born 1950) | 28 October 2012 | 2 November 2012 | 5 days | Arakkonam (Lok Sabha) | Manmohan Singh |
| 7 | | Minister of Commerce & Industry (MoS) | S. Jagathrakshakan (born 1950) | 2 November 2012 | 21 March 2013 | 139 days | Arakkonam (Lok Sabha) | Manmohan Singh |

== List of Deputy Speaker of Lok Sabha ==
| Portrait | Name (Birth–Death) | Elected constituency | Lok Sabha (Election) | Speaker | Assumed office | Left office | Time in office | Prime Minister |
|---|---|---|---|---|---|---|---|---|
| | G. Lakshmanan (1924–2001) | Chennai North | 7th (1980) | Balram Jakhar (INC) | 1 December 1980 | 31 December 1984 | 4 years, 30 days | Indira Gandhi |

== Splits and offshoots ==
There are two major parties that have been formed as a result of splits from the DMK, which are

- All India Anna Dravida Munnetra Kazhagam (AIADMK), founded on 17 October 1972 by the former Chief Minister of Tamil Nadu M. G. Ramachandran (M.G.R.).
- Marumalarchi Dravida Munnetra Kazhagam (MDMK), founded on 6 May 1994 by Member of Parliament, Rajya Sabha Vaiko.

=== Political lineage and offsprings of DMK ===
Justice Party; 1917
Self-respect movement 1925
Dravidar Kazhagam; 1944 | Justice Party (PTR)
Dravida Munnetra Kazhagam; 1949
Tamil National Party; 1962
Merger with Indian National Congress; 1964
All India Anna; Dravida Munnetra Kazhagam; 17 October 1972
Thazhthapattor Munnetra Kazhagam; 1974
Makkal Dravida Munnetra Kazhagam; 1977
Merger with AIADMK; 1977
M.G.R.'s death on 24 December 1987
AIADMK; Jayalalithaa faction | AIADMK; Janaki faction
Thamizhaga Munnetra Munnani; 1988
Merger with Janata Dal; 1989 | AIADMK unifies again Janaki's faction dissolved and merged with Jayalalithaa's faction 1989
Marumalarchi; Dravida Munnetra Kazhagam; 1994
MGR Kazhagam; 1995
MGR Anna; DMK; 1996
Merger with Bharatiya Janata Party; 2002
Major Dravidian parties that are currently active | Dravidar Kazhagam | All India Anna; Dravida Munnetra Kazhagam | Marumalarchi; Dravida Munnetra Kazhagam | Dravida Munnetra Kazhagam

== Media ==
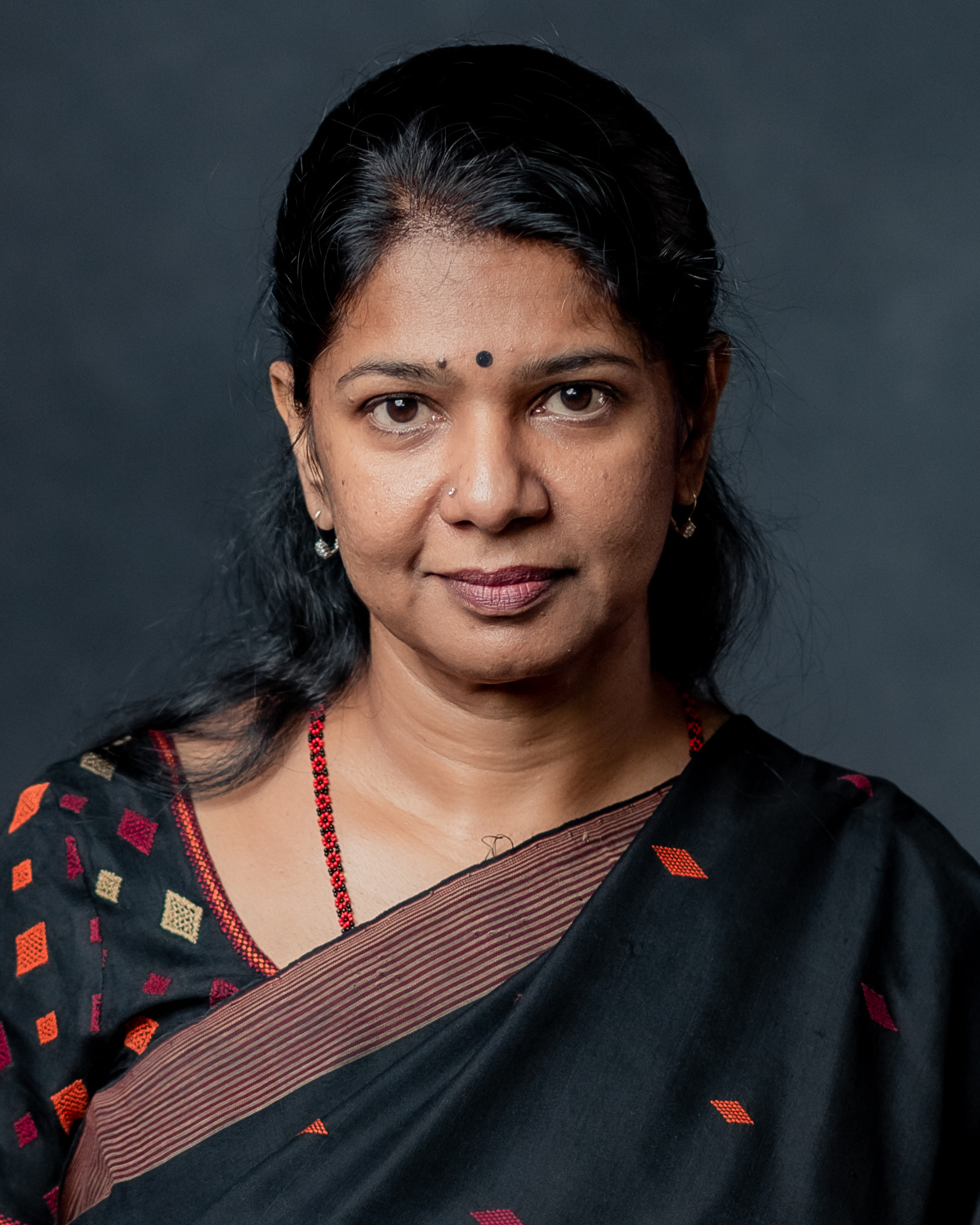
Tmt. Kanimozhi Rajathi Karunanidhi
Deputy General Secretary of the party

Dravida Munnetra Kazhagam party runs two newspapers: an English weekly named The Rising Sun and a Tamil daily named Murasoli.

Kalaignar TV is a TV channel group started on 15 September 2007 and managed by Kanimozhi Karunanidhi and Dayalu Ammal, the daughter and wife of Karunanidhi. The group has multiple sister channels: Kalaignar Isai Aruvi (24×7 Tamil music channel), Kalaignar Seithigal (24×7 Tamil news channel), Kalaignar Sirippoli (24×7 Tamil comedy channel), Kalaignar Chithiram (24×7 Tamil cartoon channel), Kalaignar Murasu(24×7 Tamil movie channel) and Kalaignar Asia.

== See also ==
- Politics of Tamil Nadu
- All India Anna Dravida Munnetra Kazhagam
- 2G spectrum case
- Granite scam in Tamil Nadu
- Controversy of arrests in Tamil Nadu about construction of flyovers
- Dinakaran attack
- Leelavathi murder
- Kallakudi demonstration
- Assassination of Rajiv Gandhi
- Politics of India
- List of political parties in India
- Indian National Developmental Inclusive Alliance

== Notes ==
=== Publications ===
- Ahuja, M. L. (1998). Electoral politics and general elections in India, 1952–1998. New Delhi: Mittal Publication. ISBN 978-81-7099-711-5.
- Chakrabarty, Bidyut (2008). Indian Politics and Society Since Independence. Routledge. ISBN 978-0-415-40868-4.
- Copley, Antony R. H. (1978). The political career of C. Rajagopalachari, 1937–1954: a moralist in politics. Macmillan.
- Dirks, Nicholas B. (2001). Castes of Mind: Colonialism and the Making of Modern India. Princeton University Press. ISBN 978-0-691-08895-2.
- Fishman, Joshua; Garcia, Ofelia (2010). Handbook of Language and Ethnic Identity:The Success-Failure Continuum in Language and Ethnic Identity Efforts (Volume 2): The Success-Failure Continuum in Language and Ethnic Identity Efforts. Oxford University Press, USA. pp. 230–. ISBN 978-0-19-539245-6.
- Hardgrave, Robert L. (1 August 1965). "The Riots in Tamilnad: Problems and Prospects of India's Language Crisis". Asian Survey. 5 (8): 399–407. doi:10.2307/2642412. ISSN 0004-4687. JSTOR 2642412.
- Hardgrave, Robert L. (1 March 1973). "Politics and the Film in Tamilnadu: The Stars and the DMK". Asian Survey. 13 (3): 288–305. doi:10.2307/2643038. hdl:2152/34387. ISSN 0004-4687. JSTOR 2643038.
- Hodges, Sara (2005). "Revolutionary family life and the Self Respect movement in Tamil south India". Contributions to Indian Sociology. 39 (2): 251–277. doi:10.1177/006996670503900203. S2CID 144419547.
- Jaffrelot, Christophe (2003). India's silent revolution: the rise of the low castes in North Indian politics. C. Hurst & Co. ISBN 1-85065-398-4.
- Krishnan, Rajan Kurai; Sriramachandran, Ravindran; Subagunarajan, V. M. S. (2022). Rule of the Commoner: DMK and Formations of the Political in Tamil Nadu, 1949–1967. Cambridge University Press. ISBN 978-1-009-19717-5.
- Mills, James H.; Sen, Satadru (2004). Confronting the body: the politics of physicality in colonial and post-colonial India. Anthem Press. ISBN 978-1-84331-033-4.
- Murali, Geetha Kamalakshi (2007). Tracing the Signs: Voter Mobilization and the Functionality of Ideas in Tamil Nadu. CA: University of California, Berkeley. ISBN 9780549737612.
- Omvedt, Gail (2006). Dalit Visions: The Anti-caste Movement and the Construction on an Indian Identity. Orient Longman. ISBN 978-81-250-2895-6.
- Palanithurai, Ganapathy (1997). Polyethnicity in India and Canada: Possibilities for Exploration. M.D. Publications Pvt. Ltd. ISBN 978-8-175-33039-9.
- Radhan, O.P. (2002). "A Time-Bound Plan for Muslim India". Encyclopaedia of Political Parties. Anmol Publications. ISBN 978-81-7488-865-5.
- Rajagopalan, Swarna (2001). State and nation in south Asia. Lynne Rienner Publishers. ISBN 978-1-55587-967-9.
- Ram, N. (1977). Barnett, Marguerite Ross (ed.). "Pre-History and History of the DMK". Social Scientist. 6 (5): 59–91. doi:10.2307/3520089. ISSN 0970-0293. JSTOR 3520089.
- Ramaswamy, Sumathi (20 November 1997). "5.29 The Warrior Devotee". Passions of the Tongue: Language Devotion in Tamil India, 1891–1970. University of California Press. ISBN 978-0-520-20805-6.
- Rana, Mahendra Singh (2006). India votes: Lok Sabha & Vidhan Sabha elections 2001–2005. New Delhi: Sarup & Sons. ISBN 978-81-7625-647-6.
- Rubinoff, Arthur G. (1997). "General Elections, 1996: Local Issues Dominate in Andhra Pradesh and Tamil Nadu". Economic and Political Weekly. 32 (43): 2829–2835. ISSN 0012-9976. JSTOR 4406016.
- Subramanian, Narendra (1 November 2002). "Identity Politics and Social Pluralism: Political Sociology and Political Change in Tamil Nadu". Commonwealth & Comparative Politics. 40 (3): 125–139. doi:10.1080/713999599. S2CID 153856033.
- Swaminathan, S. (1974). Karunanidhi: man of destiny. Affiliated East-West Press. ISBN 9780333902127.
- Venu, E.Es. (1979). Why South opposes Hindi. Justice Publications.
- "Tamil Nadu Legislative Assembly Quadrennial Review 1957–62" (PDF). Fort St. George, Madras: Legislative Assembly Department. June 1962.
- "Tamil Nadu Legislative Assembly Quadrennial Review 1962–67" (PDF). Fort St. George, Madras: Legislative Assembly Department. June 1967.
- "Tamil Nadu Legislative Assembly Quadrennial Review 1967–70" (PDF). Fort St. George, Madras: Legislative Assembly Department. June 1971. Archived from the original (PDF) on 2 December 2013.
- "Tamil Nadu Legislative Assembly Quadrennial Review 1971–76" (PDF). Fort St. George, Madras: Legislative Assembly Department. June 1976.
- "Tamil Nadu Legislative Assembly Quadrennial Review 1977–80" (PDF). Fort St. George, Madras: Legislative Assembly Department. 1980.
- "Statistical report on Tamil Nadu Assembly elections 1984" (PDF). New Delhi: Election Commission of India. 1984.
- "Statistical report on Tamil Nadu Assembly elections 2001" (PDF). New Delhi: Election Commission of India. 2001.
- "Statistical report on Tamil Nadu Assembly elections 2011" (PDF). New Delhi: Election Commission of India. 2011.
- "Statistical report on Tamil Nadu Assembly general elections 1980" (PDF). New Delhi: Election Commission of India. 1980.
- "Statistical report on Tamil Nadu Assembly general elections 1989" (PDF). New Delhi: Election Commission of India. 1989.
- "Statistical report on Tamil Nadu Assembly general elections 1991" (PDF). New Delhi: Election Commission of India. 1991.
- "Statistical report on Tamil Nadu Assembly general elections 1996" (PDF). New Delhi: Election Commission of India. 1996. Archived from the original (PDF) on 7 October 2010.
- "Statistical report on Tamil Nadu Assembly general elections 2006" (PDF). New Delhi: Election Commission of India. 2006.*"General Election Results 2024". Election Results. 2024.
