= Kamaraj ministry =

Government of Madras, India (1954–1957)

First Kamaraj ministry
- Ministry of Madras State
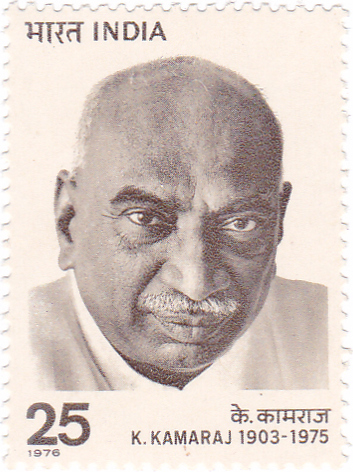
- Date formed: 13 April 1954
- Date dissolved: 31 March 1957

People and organisations
- Governor: Sri Prakasa; A. J. John
- Chief Minister: K. Kamaraj
- Member party: Indian National Congress

History
- Election: 1952
- Outgoing election: 1957
- Legislature term: 1952–1957
- Predecessor: C. Rajagopalachari ministry
- Successor: Second Kamaraj ministry

The First Kamaraj ministry was the Council of Ministers of Madras State headed by Chief Minister K. Kamaraj from 13 April 1954 to 31 March 1957.

K. Kamaraj was sworn in as the Chief Minister of Madras State on 13 April 1954. Kamaraj ousted Rajaji on 31 March 1954 and was elected the leader of Congress Legislative Party. Kamaraj consolidated his position by offering ministerial position to leaders of Tamil Nadu Toilers Party and Commonweal Party.

== Council of Ministers ==
Members of the ministry who served between 13 April 1954 and 31st March 1957 under the Chief Ministership of Kamaraj are:

Name	Office	Portfolio	Took Office	Left Office	Reason for Leaving Office
K. Kamaraj	Chief Minister	Public and Police in the Home Department	13 April 1954	31 March 1957	
A. B. Shetty	Minister	Medical and Public Health, Cooperation, Housing and Ex-servicemen	13 April 1954	1 March 1956	Following the States Reorganisation Act of 1956, A. B. Shetty quit the Ministry on 1 March 1956 and his portfolio was shared between other ministers in the cabinet.
M. Bhaktavatsalam	Minister	Agriculture, Forests, Fisheries, Cinchona, Rural Welfare, Community Projects, National Extension Scheme, Women's Welfare, Industries and Labour and Animal Husbandry and Veterinary	13 April 1954	31 March 1957	
C. Subramaniam	Minister	Finance, Food, Education, Elections and Information and Publicity and Law (Courts and Prisons)	13 April 1954	31 March 1957	
M. A. Manickavelu Naicker	Minister	Land Revenue and Commercial Taxes and Rural Development	13 April 1954	31 March 1957	
Raja Sri Shanmuga Rajeswara Sethupathi	Minister	Public Works, Accommodation Control, Engineering Colleges, Stationery and Printing including Establishment questions of the Stationery Department and the Government Press	13 April 1954	31 March 1957	
B. Parameswaran	Minister	Transport, Harijan Uplift, Hindu Religious Endowments, Registration and Prohibition	13 April 1954	31 March 1957	
S. S. Ramasami Padayachi	Minister	Local Administration	13 April 1954	31 March 1957	
