= S. Madhavan =

Indian politician (1932 - 2018)

Former Minister of Tamil Nadu
- In office 15 March 1971 – 31 January 1976
- Chief Minister: M. Karunanidhi
- Constituency: Tiruppattur
- In office 10 February 1969 – 4 January 1971
- Chief Minister: M. Karunanidhi
- Constituency: Tiruppattur
- In office 6 March 1967 – 14 January 1969
- Chief Minister: C. N. Annadurai
- Constituency: Tiruppattur

Member of Tamil Nadu Legislative Assembly
- In office 1984–1989
- Chief Minister: M. G. Ramachandran
- In office 1962–1967
- Chief Minister: K. Kamaraj & M. Bakthavatsalam

Personal details
- Born: 20 August 1932 Singampunari, Madura District, Madras Presidency, British India
- Died: 3 April 2018 (aged 84) Singampunari, Sivagangai, Tamil Nadu, India
- Party: Dravida Munnetra Kazhagam Makkal Dravida Munnetra Kazhagam (1977)

S. Madhavan (20 August 1932 – 3 April 2018) was an Indian politician who served as a member of the Legislative Assembly in Tamil Nadu. He was elected to the Tamil Nadu legislative assembly from the Thirukoshtiyur constituency as a Dravida Munnetra Kazhagam candidate in the 1962 election. He was subsequently elected from the Tirupattur constituency for the Dravida Munnetra Kazhagam in the 1967 and 1971, and for the Anna Dravida Munnetra Kazhagam in the 1984 election.

== Early life and career ==
Madhavan was born in Singampunari in the Sivagangai district. He began his career as a lawyer, representing many Dravida Munnetra Kazhagam leaders in the 1950s, and later became associated with the party and the Dravidian movement. He was elected to the State Assembly from the Thirukoshtiyur constituency in 1962. After being elected again from the Tirupattur constituency in the 1967 elections, he joined the cabinet headed by DMK founder, C.N. Annadurai as the Law Minister. Madhavan was re-elected from the same constituency in the 1971 elections and served in the cabinets headed by C.N. Annadurai and M. Karunanidhi.

Following a split in the DMK, he joined the AIADMK under the leadership of M.G. Ramachandran. He was elected from Tirupattur as an AIADMK candidate in the 1984 elections. Later, he aligned with Jayalalithaa and served as the party's treasurer before becoming less active in politics. Madhavan also served as a Rajya Sabha member from 1990 to 1996.

He maintained relationships with other party leaders in his constituency and in Tamil Nadu. Madhavan also wrote political articles for newspapers such as The Hindu, Dinamani, and Murasoli.

== Death ==
Madhavan died at the age of 85 due to an age-related illness on 3 April 2018 at his home in Singampunari. He was survived by his wife, two daughters, and a son. Following his death, M.K. Stalin, TNCC general secretary S. Thirunavukkarasar, government ministers, and industrialists across Tamil Nadu paid tribute to Madhavan.
