= Ujjal Singh =

Indian politician (1895–1983)

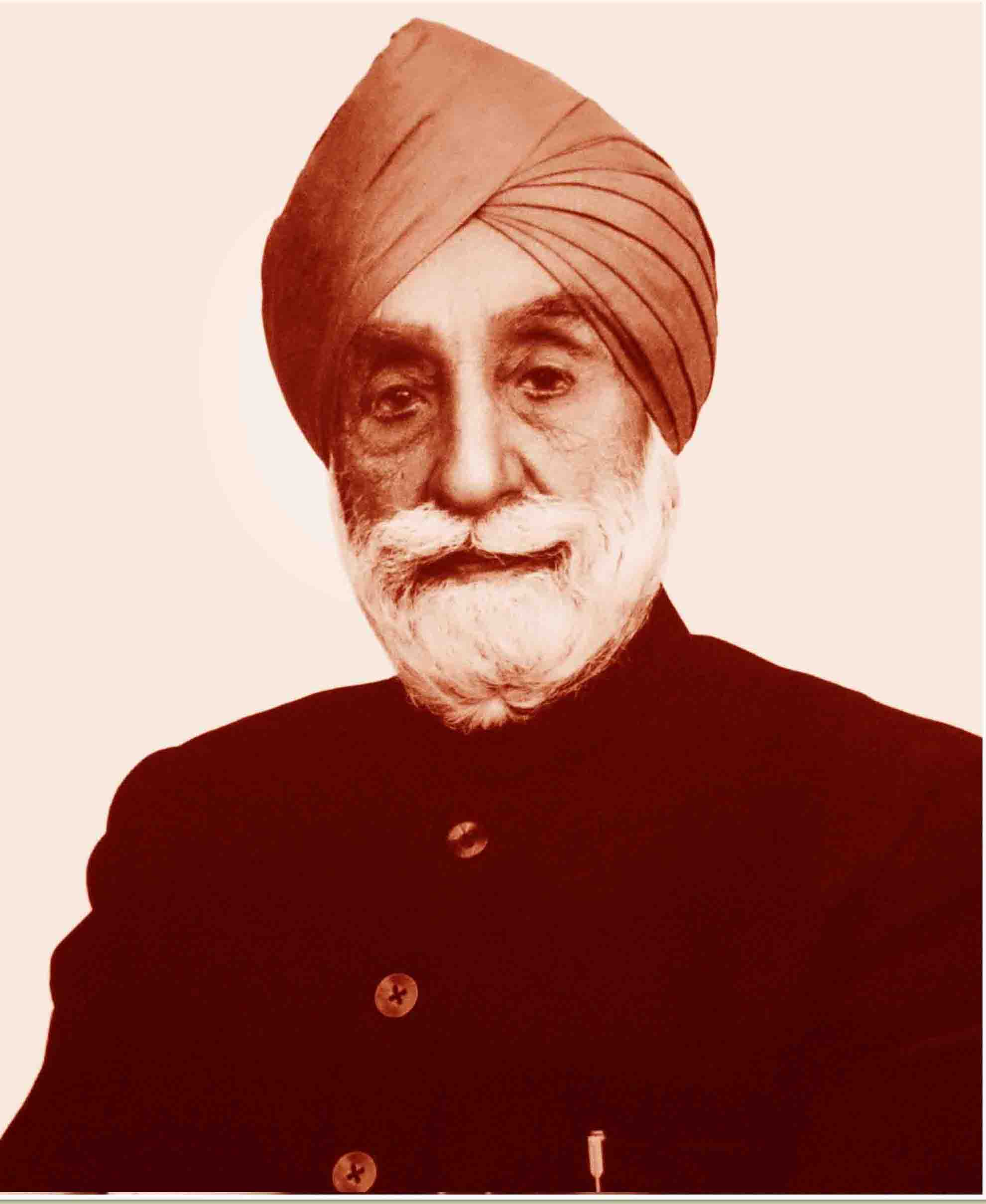

1st Governor of Tamil Nadu
- In office 14 January 1969 – 27 May 1971
- Chief Minister: C. N. Annadurai (Note: V. R. Nedunchezhiyan (Interim)); M. Karunanidhi
- Preceded by: Office Established
- Succeeded by: Kodardas Kalidas Shah

7th Governor of Madras State
- In office 28 June 1966 – 14 January 1969 (Acting to till 16 June 1967)
- Chief Minister: M. Bhaktavatsalam; C. N. Annadurai
- Preceded by: Jayachamarajendra Wadiyar
- Succeeded by: Office Abolished

6th Governor of Punjab
- In office 1 September 1965 – 26 June 1966
- Chief Minister: Ram Kishan
- Preceded by: Hafiz Mohamad Ibrahim
- Succeeded by: Dharma Vira

Personal details
- Born: 27 December 1895 Hadali, Punjab, British Raj
- Died: 15 February 1983 (aged 87) New Delhi, India
- Other political affiliations: Indian National Congress; Shiromani Akali Dal; Khalsa National Party
- Relations: Sardar Inder Singh (grandfather); Sardar Sujan Singh (father); Lakshmi Devi (mother); Sir Sobha Singh (brother); Khushwant Singh (nephew); Brigadier Gurbux Singh (nephew); Daljit Singh (nephew); Rukhsana Sultana (relative); Amrita Singh (relative); Santsev Kaur (spouse); Sunder Singh Dhupia (father-in-law); Kartar Kaur (mother-in-law); Bhai Vir Singh (grandfather-in-law)
- Education: Government College University, Lahore
- Committees: Cripps Mission; Sir Tej Bahadur Sapru Committee; Punjabi University Commission

Governor Ujjal Singh (27 December 1895 – 15 February 1983) was an Indian politician who was a participant in the First Round Table Conference, opened officially by King George V on 12 November 1930. Ujjal Singh served as the Finance Minister of Punjab, Governor of Punjab, and as Governor of Tamil Nadu . Prior to this he was one of Pre-Partition Punjab's largest landowners, owning thousands of acres in Hadali, Jaranwala, Mian Channu, Lyallpur, Montgomery, Sargodha and other areas.

== Early life and family ==
He was the younger of the two sons of Sujan Singh and Lakshmi Devi, Sujan Singh was a famous agriculturalist in Punjab. Ujjal Singh was born on 27 December 1895 in the Hadali village belonging to the Shahpur district. His primary education came from Dharmshalas and Madrasas, although he passed his middle examination in Khalsa High School, Amritsar. He pursued his M.A in History from Government College, Lahore in the year 1916 and received a Master's degree. He excelled in hockey. His elder brother was Sir Sobha Singh, the principal contractor during the construction of New Delhi, 1911–1930.

He received Sardar Sujan Singh's property in Punjab and through it he had a profitable agricultural, cloth and spinning industry to make him a successful businessman. He lived in his house in Mian Channu known currently as Haveli Ujjal Singh near his father's house, now a railway station, known as Kot Sujan Singh. He was first introduced to politics, specifically Sikh politics, by his cousin Sardar Bahadur Mehtab Singh.

He was then married to Santsev Kaur, daughter of builder Sunder Singh Dhupia and granddaughter of famous poet-philosopher and 'Father of Modern Punjabi Literature' Bhai Vir Singh. His first wife passed away during childbirth and he was married once more.

== Pre-Partition ==
=== Business career ===
After the passing of his father Sujan Singh, the business in Delhi was taken over by his brother Sir Sobha Singh and the mass of land in West Punjab was given to Ujjal Singh. His brother’s properties were also given to him to take care of, this included lands in Jaranwala and Hadali, Ujjal Singh managed to greatly expand his business empire from Mian Channu, Khanewal, Jaranwala, Bhalwal, Multan, Lyallpur, Sahiwal, Sargodha and Lahore.

His Lower Bari Doab estate in Khanewal itself was 1,700 acres and his father’s Jagir was over 20,000 acres, a 200 acre citrus Orchard in Sargodha along with four cotton factories in Jaranwala and Bhalwal- named Khalsa Cotton Factory, New Khalsa Cotton Factory, Inder Cotton Factory and New Inder Cotton Factory.

His name was famed in West Punjab even after Partition, Ujjal Singh became a household name for landowning Sikh lower-nobility.

=== Early Politics and Freedom Fighting ===
At the young age of 22, in 1917 Ujjal Singh had participated as a representative of Sikhs during the Montagu–Chelmsford Reforms.

Ujjal Singh first joined the Chief Khalsa Diwan of Sir Sundar Singh Majithia in 1919. He was elected to the Punjab Legislative Council in (1926–36) and continued serving till 1956. He also served as the secretary of the Khalsa National Party, which was created by Sir Jogendra Singh in 1935 where he worked in Sikh political and religious affairs and became a member of the first Shiromani Gurdwara Parbandhak Committee. His actions were well received by the Sikh spheres- by the time he became famous his cousin Mehtab Singh became the President of Shiromani Gurdwara Parbandhak Committee and the Deputy President of Punjab Legislative Council.

He supported Jathedar Akali Baba Chet Singh Nihang's crusade for allowing the Akali-Nihangs to keep spears and full-length swords with themselves at all times. Later he also actively participated in the Gurdwara Reform Movement (1921-1924) also known as the Akali Movement. From 1929-1930 he served as a secretary of the Punjab Reforms Committee.

He served as Parliamentary Secretary (Home) in the Unionist Government in undivided Punjab (1936-1941) under Sikander Hayat Khan- but resigned after differences. He was, later, part of an Indian delegation to the Food and Agriculture Organization held in Quebec. He was nominated as the Urban Sikh representative to the 1st and 2nd Round Table Conferences held in London. He resigned in protest to the British not freeing Akali prisoners during the Gurdwara Reform Movement. Later he refused to attend the 3rd Round Table Conference in protest to the Communal Award and the British not taking the Sikh stance into consideration.

He was then a part of the Sir Tej Bahadur Sapru Committee in 1944. From 1946 onwards he joined the Indian National Congress.

== Post-Partition ==
=== Partition of Punjab ===
Independence of Sikhistan was declared on 9 March in Maharaja Dalip Singh Nagar, Lahore by Ujjal Singh himself along with other notable Sikhs like Master Tara Singh and Giani Kartar Singh Jhabbar. He was a part of the Sikh Council of Action set up with Dictator Niranjan Singh Gill of the Azad Hind Fauj. He was then elected into the Defense Committee to protect Hindus and Sikhs from Islamic aggression. He then visited Rawalpindi and Panja Sahib to help Hindus and Sikhs who fell prey to riots in West Punjab. He along with Jawaharlal Nehru arrived and secured the protection of refugees in Punjab.

=== Business career ===
He had later helped resettle refugees, he himself being one as he had no property in India and was homeless. He stayed with his brother, Sir Sobha Singh, for a few months and then later bought a home for himself in Mashobra, Himachal Pradesh and lived there for a very long time. He also received land in compensation in Karkarduma and Said up-Ajaib, Delhi along with an orchard lane in Panipat and he bought a third of a house in Curzon Road, in New Delhi with the other two-thirds belonging to Sardar Bahadur Mohan Singh of Rawalpindi.

He was also the Director and Chairman of the Punjab & Sind Bank from 1947 to 1960. He served as Minister of Industries and Civil Supplies, and again as Finance and Industries Minister between 1949 and 1956. He was a member of the Second Finance Commission established by the Government of India from June 1956 to September 1957.

=== Political career ===
Ujjal Singh argued in favour of the adoption of the Objective Resolution which laid down the founding principles of the Constitution.

He served as Governor of Punjab from 1 September 1965 to 27 June 1966, during the Indo-Pakistani War of 1965 and the Punjabi Suba Movement. He supported the movement and was a key reason for it not drowning in blood and being kept peaceful.

He was the Governor of Tamil Nadu from 28 June 1966 to 25 May 1971.

== Death ==
Ujjal Singh died at his New Delhi residence on 15 February 1983. Offices, corporations, boards and educational institutions of the Punjab Government were closed as a mark of respect. The Punjab Vidhan Sabha observed a 2 minute silence at the start of its budget session. The Tamil Nadu Legislative Council adjourned half-an-hour at Madras as a mark of respect to his memory.

== Personal life ==
He was very economically minded, but also religiously minded. He was a member of the Shiromani Gurdwara Parbandhak Committee since its inception. He heavily promoted education, he was a member of the Khalsa College organizing committee, a Fellow of the Panjab University and member of the Delhi University Court.

As a member of the Punjabi University Commission (1960), he was instrumental in setting up of Punjabi University, Patiala. He was the founder of Guru Nanak Public School, Chandigarh, where he served as Founder President.

He had two wives, and four children- one was Narinder Singh, who passed away at a young age- Narinder Singh Place in Connaught Place (now owned by DLF) was named in his memory by Sir Sobha Singh. He had three daughters, two twins, one daughter was named Kushal Kaur who married into the Sardar Bahadur Dharam Singh Sethi family.

Many buildings are named after him in Mian Channu, these include;

1. Ujjal Singh Haveli, Mian Channu, Pakistan
2. Ujjal Singh Building 1, Mian Channu, Pakistan
3. Ujjal Singh Building 2, Mian Channu, Pakistan
4. Ujjal Singh Building 3, Mian Channu, Pakistan

The sites he contracted include:

1. Qasr-e-Latif, Mian Channu, Pakistan
2. New Khalsa Factory, Jaranwala, Pakistan
3. Inder Cotton Factory, Bhalwal, Pakistan
4. Inder Cotton Factory, Sargodha, Pakistan
