= List of leaders of the house in the Tamil Nadu Legislative Assembly =

Caucus head of the majority party in the Tamil Nadu Legislative Assembly

Leader of the House in the Tamil Nadu Legislative Assembly
- Tamiḻnāṭu Caṭṭamaṉṟa Muṉṉavar
- Emblem of Tamil Nadu

- Flag of India

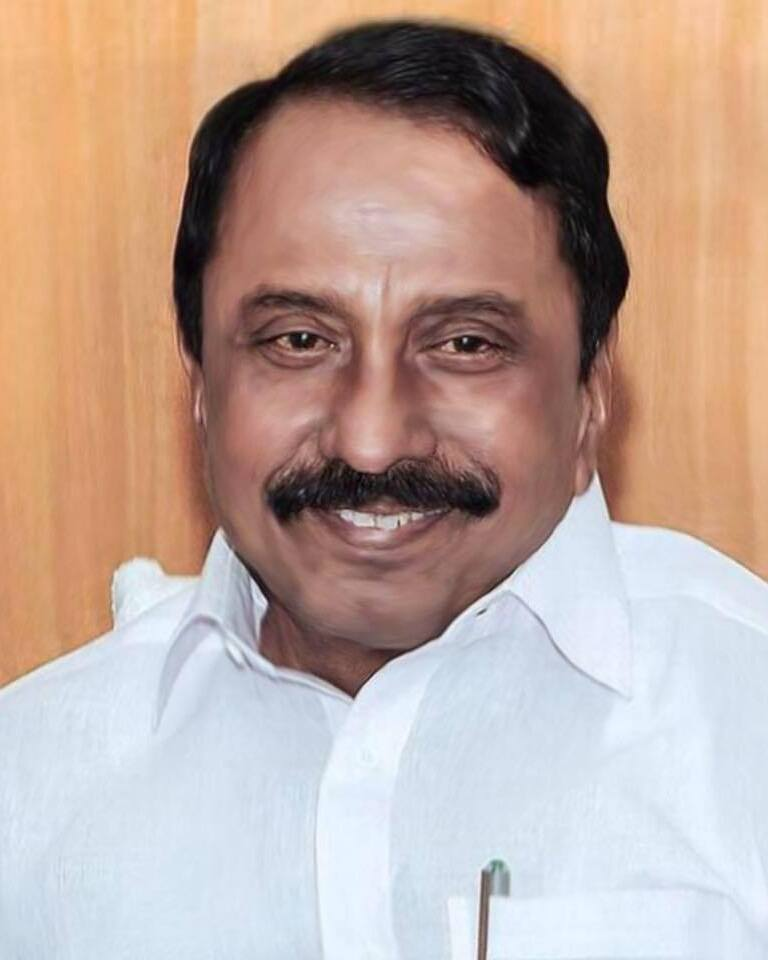
- Incumbent; K. A. Sengottaiyan since 12 May 2026
- Reports to: Speaker of the Tamil Nadu Legislative Assembly
- Appointer: Government of Tamil Nadu
- Formation: 3 May 1952; 74 years ago
- First holder: C. Subramaniam

The leader of the house in the Tamil Nadu Legislative Assembly is an elected member of the legislative assembly who leads the ruling party in the Tamil Nadu Legislative Assembly. The leader of the house in the Tamil Nadu Legislative Assembly is the chairperson of the legislative assembly's largest political party, which is part of the government of Tamil Nadu. The government appoints one of the ministers as the leader of the house. Rules of procedure provide that the speaker of the legislative assembly shall consult the leader of the house before allocating time for discussion of certain items of business. The arrangement of government business is his ultimate responsibility. His foremost duty is to assist the speaker in the conduct of business.

Since 1952, the Tamil Nadu Legislative Assembly has had 12 leaders of the house. C. Subramaniam of the Indian National Congress (INC) was the first holder of the office of leader of the house in the legislative assembly. V. R. Nedunchezhiyan was the longest-serving leader of the house and was chosen from both Dravidian parties, the Dravida Munnetra Kazhagam (DMK) and the All India Anna Dravida Munnetra Kazhagam (AIADMK), which ruled Tamil Nadu for several periods of time. K. Anbazhagan from the DMK has the second-longest tenure, and Subramaniam from the INC has the third-longest tenure. M. Bhakthavatsalam, Nedunchezhiyan, M. Karunanidhi, and O. Panneerselvam also served as leader of the house in the assembly during their respective tenures as chief minister.

The current incumbent has been K. A. Sengottaiyan of the Tamilaga Vettri Kazhagam (TVK) since 12 May 2026.

== List ==
Key

- ^{RES} Resigned
- ^{§} Returned to office after a previous non-consecutive term

AIADMK (7) DMK (4) INC (2) TVK (1)
No.	Portrait	Name (Birth–Death)	Elected constituency	Term of office (Note: The ordinal number of the term being served by the person specified in the row in the corresponding period.)			Assembly (Election)	Speaker	Political party
No.	Portrait	Name (Birth–Death)	Elected constituency	Assumed office	Left office	Time in office	Assembly (Election)	Speaker	Political party
1		C. Subramaniam (1910–2000)	Coimbatore East	3 May 1952	31 March 1957	9 years, 273 days	1st (1952)	J. Shivashanmugam N. Gopala Menon	Indian National Congress
1		C. Subramaniam (1910–2000)	Kovilpalayam	29 April 1957	1 March 1962	9 years, 273 days	2nd (1957)	U. Krishna Rao	Indian National Congress
2		M. Bhakthavatsalam (1897–1987)	Sriperumbudur	29 March 1962	28 February 1967	4 years, 336 days	3rd (1962)	S. Chellapandian	Indian National Congress
3		V. R. Nedunchezhiyan (1920–2000)	Triplicane	6 March 1967	10 February 1969^{[RES]}	1 year, 341 days	4th (1967)	S. P. Adithanar Pulavar K. Govindan	Dravida Munnetra Kazhagam
4		M. Karunanidhi (1924–2018)	Saidapet	13 February 1969	13 August 1969^{[RES]}	181 days	4th (1967)	S. P. Adithanar Pulavar K. Govindan	Dravida Munnetra Kazhagam
(3)		V. R. Nedunchezhiyan (1920–2000)	Triplicane	14 August 1969^{[§]}	5 January 1971	6 years, 100 days	4th (1967)	S. P. Adithanar Pulavar K. Govindan	Dravida Munnetra Kazhagam
(3)		V. R. Nedunchezhiyan (1920–2000)	Triplicane	16 March 1971	31 January 1976	6 years, 100 days	5th (1971)	K. A. Mathiazhagan Pulavar K. Govindan	Dravida Munnetra Kazhagam
5		Nanjil K. Manoharan (1929–2000)	Palayamkottai	4 July 1977	17 February 1980	2 years, 228 days	6th (1977)	Munu Adhi	All India Anna Dravida Munnetra Kazhagam
(3)		V. R. Nedunchezhiyan (1920–2000)	Tirunelveli	19 June 1980^{[§]}	15 November 1984	7 years, 99 days	7th (1980)	K. Rajaram	All India Anna Dravida Munnetra Kazhagam
(3)		V. R. Nedunchezhiyan (1920–2000)	Athoor	25 February 1985	6 January 1988^{[RES]}	7 years, 99 days	8th (1984)	P. H. Pandian	All India Anna Dravida Munnetra Kazhagam
6		R. M. Veerappan (1926–2024)	Tirunelveli	7 January 1988	30 January 1988	23 days	8th (1984)	P. H. Pandian	All India Anna Dravida Munnetra Kazhagam
7		K. Anbazhagan (1922–2020)	Anna Nagar	6 February 1989	30 January 1991	1 year, 358 days	9th (1989)	M. Tamilkudimagan	Dravida Munnetra Kazhagam
(3)		V. R. Nedunchezhiyan (1920–2000)	Theni	1 July 1991^{[§]}	13 May 1996	4 years, 317 days	10th (1991)	Sedapatti R. Muthiah	All India Anna Dravida Munnetra Kazhagam
(7)		K. Anbazhagan (1922–2020)	Harbour	22 May 1996^{[§]}	14 May 2001	4 years, 357 days	11th (1996)	P. T. R. Palanivel Rajan	Dravida Munnetra Kazhagam
8		C. Ponnaiyan (b. 1942)	Tiruchengode	22 May 2001	12 May 2006	4 years, 355 days	12th (2001)	K. Kalimuthu	All India Anna Dravida Munnetra Kazhagam
(7)		K. Anbazhagan (1922–2020)	Harbour	17 May 2006^{[§]}	14 May 2011	4 years, 362 days	13th (2006)	R. Avudaiappan	Dravida Munnetra Kazhagam
9		O. Panneerselvam (b. 1951)	Bodinayakkanur	23 May 2011	27 November 2014^{[RES]}	3 years, 188 days	14th (2011)	D. Jayakumar P. Dhanapal	All India Anna Dravida Munnetra Kazhagam
10		Natham R. Viswanathan (b. 1949)	Natham	28 November 2014	11 August 2015^{[RES]}	256 days	14th (2011)	D. Jayakumar P. Dhanapal	All India Anna Dravida Munnetra Kazhagam
(9)		O. Panneerselvam (b. 1951)	Bodinayakkanur	12 August 2015^{[§]}	21 May 2016	1 year, 185 days	14th (2011)	D. Jayakumar P. Dhanapal	All India Anna Dravida Munnetra Kazhagam
(9)		O. Panneerselvam (b. 1951)	Bodinayakkanur	25 May 2016	16 February 2017^{[RES]}	1 year, 185 days	15th (2016)	P. Dhanapal	All India Anna Dravida Munnetra Kazhagam
11		K. A. Sengottaiyan (b. 1948)	Gobichettipalayam	17 February 2017	3 January 2018^{[RES]}	320 days	15th (2016)	P. Dhanapal	All India Anna Dravida Munnetra Kazhagam
(9)		O. Panneerselvam (b. 1951)	Bodinayakkanur	4 January 2018^{[§]}	3 May 2021	3 years, 119 days	15th (2016)	P. Dhanapal	All India Anna Dravida Munnetra Kazhagam
12		Duraimurugan (b. 1938)	Katpadi	11 May 2021	5 May 2026	4 years, 359 days	16th (2021)	M. Appavu	Dravida Munnetra Kazhagam
(11)		K. A. Sengottaiyan (b. 1948)	Gobichettipalayam	12 May 2026	Incumbent	120 days	17th (2026)	J. C. D. Prabhakar	Tamilaga Vettri Kazhagam

Timeline

== Statistics ==
List of leaders of the house by length of term

No.	Name	Party	Length of term	
No.	Name	Party	Longest continuous term	Total duration of leadership
1	V. R. Nedunchezhiyan	AIADMK/DMK	7 years, 99 days	20 years, 127 days
2	K. Anbazhagan	DMK	4 years, 362 days	11 years 347 days
3	C. Subramaniam	INC	9 years, 273 days	9 years, 273 days
4	O. Panneerselvam	AIADMK	3 years, 188 days	8 years 127 days
5	Duraimurugan	DMK	4 years, 359 days	4 years, 359 days
6	C. Ponnaiyan	AIADMK	4 years, 355 days	4 years 355 days
7	M. Bhakthavatsalam	INC	4 years, 336 days	4 years, 336 days
8	Nanjil K. Manoharan	AIADMK	2 years, 228 days	2 years 228 days
9	K. A. Sengottaiyan	TVK/AIADMK	320 days	1 year, 75 days
10	Natham R. Viswanathan	AIADMK	256 days	256 days
11	M. Karunanidhi	DMK	181 days	181 days
12	R. M. Veerappan	AIADMK	23 days	23 days

List by party

Parties by total time-span of their member holding LoHO (9 September 2026)
No.	Political party	Number of leaders of the house	Total days of holding LOHO
1	All India Anna Dravida Munnetra Kazhagam	7	10860 days
2	Dravida Munnetra Kazhagam	4	9364 days
3	Indian National Congress	2	5357 days
4	Tamilaga Vettri Kazhagam	1	120 days

Parties by total duration (in days) of holding Leader of the House's Office

- AIADMK
- DMK
- INC
- TVK

== See also ==
- History of Tamil Nadu
- Politics of Tamil Nadu
- Elections in Tamil Nadu
- Governor of Tamil Nadu
- Chief Minister of Tamil Nadu
- Chief Secretariat of Tamil Nadu
- Tamil Nadu Legislative Assembly
- Deputy Chief Minister of Tamil Nadu
- Speaker of the Tamil Nadu Legislative Assembly
- Leader of the Opposition in the Tamil Nadu Legislative Assembly
