= Deputy Leader of the Opposition in the Tamil Nadu Legislative Assembly =

Legislative leader in Tamil Nadu, India

- Tamiḻnāṭu Caṭṭamaṉṟa Etirkkaṭcit Thunai Talvar
- Emblem of Tamil Nadu
- Incumbent; K. N. Nehru since 10 May 2026
- Appointer: Speaker of the Tamil Nadu Legislative Assembly
- Formation: 29 June 1962; 64 years ago
- First holder: M. Karunanidhi (Tamil Nadu Legislative Assembly)

The Deputy leader of the opposition in the Tamil Nadu Legislative Assembly is an elected member of the Tamil Nadu Legislative Assembly who serves as the legislative leader for the largest political party in the assembly that is not part of the government, provided that this political party holds at least ten percent of the seats in the assembly.

As of 2026, there have been 19 leaders of the opposition from six different political parties and an independent. T. Nagi Reddy of the Communist Party of India became the first leader of opposition in the 1st Madras State Assembly. P. G. Karuthiruman of the Indian National Congress was the leader of opposition, when the state was renamed as Tamil Nadu in 1969, and thus became the first leader of opposition of the Tamil Nadu Legislative Assembly.

The longest-serving leader of the opposition is J. Jayalalithaa from the All India Anna Dravida Munnetra Kazhagam (AIADMK), who has been the only female to hold the position. She held the office for five years and 280 days, followed by M. Karunanidhi of the Dravida Munnetra Kazhagam (DMK), who held the office for five years and 259 days. O. Panneerselvam of the AIADMK had the shortest reign, holding the position for nine days. The position was left vacant on two occasions as no political party secured the required proportion of seats in the assembly.

The current incumbent is K. N. Nehru of the DMK since 11 May 2026.

== List ==
Deputy Leader of opposition
No.	Portrait	Name (Birth–Death)	Elected constituency	Term of office (Note: The ordinal number of the term being served by the person specified in the row in the corresponding period.)			Assembly (Election)	Speaker	Political party
No.	Portrait	Name (Birth–Death)	Elected constituency	Assumed office	Left office	Time in office	Assembly (Election)	Speaker	Political party
1.		Durai Murugan (born 1938)	Katpadi	24 May 2001	14 April 2006	4 years, 325 days	12th (2001)	K. Kalimuthu	DMK
2.		K. A. Sengottaiyan (born 1948)	Gobichettipalayam	19 May 2006	28 May 2006	9 days	13th (2006)	R. Avudaiyappan	AIADMK
3.		O. Pannerselvam (born 1951)	Bodinayakkanur	29 May 2006	14 May 2011	4 years, 350 days	13th (2006)	R. Avudaiyappan	AIADMK
4.		Panruti S. Ramachandran (born 1937)	Alandur	27 May 2011	10 December 2013	2 years, 197 days	14th (2011)	D. Jayakumar; P. Dhanapal	DMDK
5.		Alagaapuram R. Mohanraj	Salem North	31 January 2014	21 February 2016	2 years, 21 days	14th (2011)	D. Jayakumar; P. Dhanapal	DMDK
(1).		Durai Murugan (born 1938)	Katpadi	4 June 2016	3 May 2021	4 years, 333 days	15th (2016)	P. Dhanapal	DMK
(3).		O. Pannerselvam (born 1951)	Bodinayakkanur	11 May 2021	14 February 2024	2 years, 279 days	16th (2021)	M. Appavu	AIADMK
6.		R. B. Udhayakumar (born 1973)	Thirumangalam	14 February 2024	10 May 2026	2 years, 85 days	16th (2021)	M. Appavu	AIADMK
7.		K. N. Nehru (born 1952)	Tiruchirappalli West	11 May 2026	Incumbent	185 days	17th (2026)	J. C. D. Prabhakar	DMK

== See also ==
- List of leaders of the opposition in the Tamil Nadu Legislative Assembly
