= List of leaders of the opposition in the Tamil Nadu Legislative Assembly =

Leader of the Opposition in the Tamil Nadu Legislative Assembly
- Tamiḻnāṭu Caṭṭamaṉṟa Etirkkaṭcit Talaivar
- Emblem of Tamil Nadu

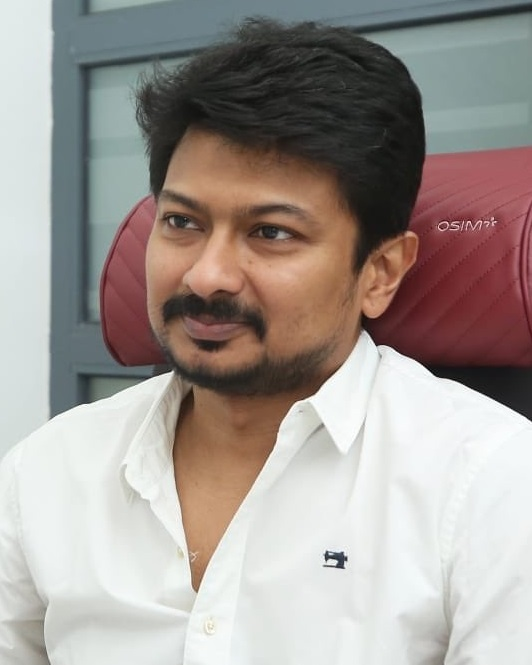
- Incumbent; Udhayanidhi Stalin since 11 May 2026
- Appointer: Speaker of the Tamil Nadu Legislative Assembly
- Formation: 6 May 1952; 74 years ago
- First holder: T. Nagi Reddy (Madras State Assembly); P. G. Karuthiruman (Tamil Nadu Legislative Assembly)
- Deputy: K. N. Nehru

The leader of the opposition in the Tamil Nadu Legislative Assembly is an elected member of the Tamil Nadu Legislative Assembly who serves as the legislative leader for the largest political party in the assembly that is not part of the government, provided that this political party holds at least ten percent of the seats in the assembly.

As of 2026, there have been 19 leaders of the opposition from six different political parties and an independent. T. Nagi Reddy of the Communist Party of India became the first leader of opposition in the 1st Madras State Assembly. P. G. Karuthiruman of the Indian National Congress was the leader of opposition, when the state was renamed as Tamil Nadu in 1969, and thus became the first leader of opposition of the Tamil Nadu Legislative Assembly.

The longest-serving leader of the opposition is J. Jayalalithaa from the All India Anna Dravida Munnetra Kazhagam (AIADMK), who has been the only female to hold the position. She held the office for five years and 280 days, followed by M. Karunanidhi of the Dravida Munnetra Kazhagam (DMK), who held the office for five years and 259 days. O. Panneerselvam of the AIADMK had the shortest reign, holding the position for nine days. The position was left vacant on two occasions as no political party secured the required proportion of seats in the assembly.

The current incumbent is Udhayanidhi Stalin of the DMK since 11 May 2026.

== List ==
Key

- ^{RES} Resigned
- ^{§} Returned to office after a previous non-consecutive term

Leader of opposition
No.	Portrait	Name (Birth–Death)	Elected constituency	Term of office (Note: The ordinal number of the term being served by the person specified in the row in the corresponding period.)			Assembly (Election)	Speaker	Political party
No.	Portrait	Name (Birth–Death)	Elected constituency	Assumed office	Left office	Time in office	Assembly (Election)	Speaker	Political party
1		T. Nagi Reddy (1917–1976)	Anantapur	6 May 1952	1 October 1953^{[RES]}	1 year, 148 days	1st (1952)	J. Shivashanmugam	Communist Party of India
2		P. Ramamurthi (1908–1987)	Madurai North	14 December 1953	31 March 1957	3 years, 107 days	1st (1952)	J. Shivashanmugam	Communist Party of India
3		V. K. Ramaswami (1901–1984)	Uthiramerur	29 April 1957	18 March 1962	4 years, 323 days	2nd (1957)	U. Krishna Rao	Independent
4		V. R. Nedunchezhiyan (1920–2000)	Triplicane	29 March 1962	28 February 1967	4 years, 336 days	3rd (1962)	S. Chellapandian	Dravida Munnetra Kazhagam
5		P. G. Karuthiruman (Note: Madras State was renamed as Tamil Nadu on 14 January 1969. Subsequently, the position of the Leader of Opposition in the Madras State Assembly became the Leader of Opposition in the Tamil Nadu Legislative Assembly.) (1919–1977)	Sathyamangalam	15 March 1967	5 January 1971	3 years, 296 days	4th (1967)	S. P. Adithanar	Indian National Congress
–	Vacant (Note: No political party met the minimum criteria of ten percent seats in the assembly)		—N/a	22 March 1971	31 January 1976	4 years, 315 days	5th (1971)	—N/a	
6		M. Karunanidhi (1924–2018)	Anna Nagar	25 July 1977	17 February 1980	5 years, 259 days	6th (1977)	Munu Adhi	Dravida Munnetra Kazhagam
6		M. Karunanidhi (1924–2018)	Anna Nagar	27 June 1980	18 August 1983^{[RES]}	5 years, 259 days	7th (1980)	K. Rajaram	Dravida Munnetra Kazhagam
7		K. S. G. Haja Shareef (1915–1999)	Triplicane	29 August 1983	15 November 1984	1 year, 78 days	7th (1980)	K. Rajaram	Indian National Congress
8		O. Subramanian (1921–2000)	Sivaganga	27 February 1985	30 January 1988	2 years, 337 days	8th (1984)	P. H. Pandian	Indian National Congress
9		J. Jayalalithaa (1948–2016)	Bodinayakkanur	9 February 1989	1 December 1989^{[RES]}	295 days	9th (1989)	M. Tamilkudimagan	All India Anna Dravida Munnetra Kazhagam
10		S. R. Eradha (1934–2020)	Madurai East	1 December 1989	19 January 1991^{[RES]}	1 year, 49 days	9th (1989)	M. Tamilkudimagan	All India Anna Dravida Munnetra Kazhagam
11		G. K. Moopanar (1931–2001)	Papanasam	19 January 1991	30 January 1991	11 days	9th (1989)	M. Tamilkudimagan	Indian National Congress
12		S. R. Balasubramoniyan (b. 1938)	Pongalur	3 July 1991	13 May 1996	4 years, 315 days	10th (1991)	Sedapatti R. Muthiah	Indian National Congress
13		S. Balakrishnan (1936–2006)	Mudukulathur	23 May 1996	14 May 2001	4 years, 356 days	11th (1996)	P. T. R. Palanivel Rajan	Tamil Maanila Congress (Moopanar)
14		K. Anbazhagan (1922–2020)	Harbour	24 May 2001	14 April 2006	4 years, 325 days	12th (2001)	K. Kalimuthu	Dravida Munnetra Kazhagam
15		O. Panneerselvam (b. 1951)	Periyakulam	19 May 2006	28 May 2006^{[RES]}	9 days	13th (2006)	R. Avudaiyappan	All India Anna Dravida Munnetra Kazhagam
(9)		J. Jayalalithaa (1948–2016)	Andipatti	29 May 2006^{[§]}	14 May 2011	4 years, 350 days	13th (2006)	R. Avudaiyappan	All India Anna Dravida Munnetra Kazhagam
16		Vijayakant (1952–2023)	Rishivandiyam	27 May 2011	21 February 2016	4 years, 270 days	14th (2011)	D. Jayakumar	Desiya Murpokku Dravida Kazhagam
–	Vacant		—N/a	22 February 2016	21 May 2016	89 days	14th (2011)	—N/a	
17		M. K. Stalin (b. 1953)	Kolathur	4 June 2016	3 May 2021	4 years, 333 days	15th (2016)	P. Dhanapal	Dravida Munnetra Kazhagam
18		Edappadi K. Palaniswami (b. 1954)	Edappadi	11 May 2021	5 May 2026	4 years, 359 days	16th (2021)	M. Appavu	All India Anna Dravida Munnetra Kazhagam
19		Udhayanidhi Stalin (b. 1977)	Chepauk-Thiruvallikeni	11 May 2026	Incumbent	186 days	17th (2026)	J. C. D. Prabhakar	Dravida Munnetra Kazhagam

Timeline

== Statistics ==
List of leaders of the opposition by length of term

No.	Name	Party	Length of term	
No.	Name	Party	Longest continuous term	Total duration of leadership
1	J. Jayalalithaa	AIADMK	4 years, 350 days	5 years, 280 days
2	M. Karunanidhi	DMK	5 years, 259 days	5 years, 259 days
3	Edappadi K. Palaniswami	AIADMK	4 years, 359 days	4 years, 359 days
4	S. Balakrishnan	TMC(M)	4 years, 356 days	4 years, 356 days
5	V. R. Nedunchezhiyan	DMK	4 years, 336 days	4 years, 336 days
6	M. K. Stalin	DMK	4 years, 333 days	4 years, 333 days
7	K. Anbazhagan	DMK	4 years, 325 days	4 years, 325 days
8	V. K. Ramaswami	IND	4 years, 323 days	4 years, 323 days
9	S. R. Balasubramoniyan	INC	4 years, 315 days	4 years, 315 days
10	Vijayakant	DMDK	4 years, 270 days	4 years, 270 days
11	P. G. Karuthiruman	INC	3 years, 296 days	3 years, 296 days
12	P. Ramamurthi	CPI	3 years, 107 days	3 years, 107 days
13	O. Subramanian	INC	2 years, 337 days	2 years, 337 days
14	T. Nagi Reddy	CPI	1 year, 148 days	1 year, 148 days
15	K. S. G. Haja Shareef	INC	1 year, 78 days	1 year, 78 days
16	S. R. Eradha	AIADMK	1 year, 49 days	1 year, 49 days
17	Udhayanidhi Stalin	DMK	186 days	186 days
18	G. K. Moopanar	INC	11 days	11 days
19	O. Panneerselvam	AIADMK	9 days	9 days

List by party

Parties by total time-span of their member holding the office of the leader of opposition (as of 13 November 2026)
No.	Political party	Count	Days
1	Dravida Munnetra Kazhagam	5	7647 days
2	Indian National Congress	5	4948 days
3	All India Anna Dravida Munnetra Kazhagam	4	4350 days
4	Tamil Maanila Congress (Moopanar)	1	1817 days
5	Communist Party of India	2	1790 days
6	Independent	1	1784 days
7	Desiya Murpokku Dravida Kazhagam	1	1731 days

Parties by total duration (in days) of holding Leader of the Opposition's Office

- DMK
- INC
- AIADMK
- TMC(M)
- CPI
- IND
- DMDK

== List of deputy leaders of the opposition ==
Key

- ^{RES} Resigned
- ^{§} Returned to office after a previous non-consecutive term

Deputy leader of opposition
No.	Portrait	Name (Birth–Death)	Elected constituency	Term of office			Assembly (Election)	Political party	Leader of the Opposition
No.	Portrait	Name (Birth–Death)	Elected constituency	Assumed office	Left office	Time in office	Assembly (Election)	Political party	Leader of the Opposition
1		M. Karunanidhi (1924–2018)	Thanjavur	29 March 1962	28 February 1967	4 years, 336 days	3rd (1962)	Dravida Munnetra Kazhagam	V. R. Nedunchezhiyan
2		K. Anbazhagan (1922–2020)	Purasawalkam	25 July 1977	17 February 1980	5 years, 259 days	6th (1977)	Dravida Munnetra Kazhagam	M. Karunanidhi
2		K. Anbazhagan (1922–2020)	Purasawalkam	27 June 1980	18 August 1983^{[RES]}	5 years, 259 days	7th (1980)	Dravida Munnetra Kazhagam	M. Karunanidhi
3		Su. Thirunavukkarasar (b. 1949)	Aranthangi	9 February 1989	23 July 1990	1 year, 164 days	9th (1989)	All India Anna Dravida Munnetra Kazhagam	J. Jayalalithaa S. R. Eradha
4		K. A. Sengottaiyan (b. 1948)	Gobichettipalayam	23 June 1990	19 January 1991	180 days	9th (1989)	All India Anna Dravida Munnetra Kazhagam	S. R. Eradha
5		Duraimurugan (b. 1938)	Katpadi	24 May 2001	14 April 2006	4 years, 325 days	12th (2001)	Dravida Munnetra Kazhagam	K. Anbazhagan
(4)		K. A. Sengottaiyan (b. 1948)	Gobichettipalayam	19 May 2006^{[§]}	28 May 2006^{[RES]}	9 days	13th (2006)	All India Anna Dravida Munnetra Kazhagam	O. Panneerselvam
6		O. Panneerselvam (b. 1951)	Periyakulam	29 May 2006	14 May 2011	4 years, 350 days	13th (2006)	All India Anna Dravida Munnetra Kazhagam	J. Jayalalithaa
7		Panruti S. Ramachandran (b. 1937)	Alandur	27 May 2011	10 December 2013^{[RES]}	2 years, 197 days	14th (2011)	Desiya Murpokku Dravida Kazhagam	Vijayakant
8		Alagaapuram R. Mohanraj (b. 1954)	Salem North	31 January 2014	21 February 2016	2 years, 21 days	14th (2011)	Desiya Murpokku Dravida Kazhagam	Vijayakant
(5)		Duraimurugan (b. 1938)	Katpadi	4 June 2016^{[§]}	3 May 2021	4 years, 333 days	15th (2016)	Dravida Munnetra Kazhagam	M. K. Stalin
(6)		O. Panneerselvam (b. 1951)	Bodinayakanur	14 June 2021^{[§]}	11 July 2022	1 year, 27 days	16th (2021)	All India Anna Dravida Munnetra Kazhagam	Edappadi K. Palaniswami
9		R. B. Udhayakumar (b. 1973)	Thirumangalam	19 July 2022	5 May 2026	3 years, 290 days	16th (2021)	All India Anna Dravida Munnetra Kazhagam	Edappadi K. Palaniswami
10		K. N. Nehru (b. 1952)	Tiruchirappalli (West)	11 May 2026	Incumbent	186 days	17th (2026)	Dravida Munnetra Kazhagam	Udhayanidhi Stalin

== See also ==
- Chief Minister of Tamil Nadu
- Elections in Tamil Nadu
- History of Tamil Nadu
- Politics of Tamil Nadu
- Governor of Tamil Nadu
- List of leaders of the house in the Tamil Nadu Legislative Assembly
