= K. A. Sengottaiyan =

Indian politician (born 1948)

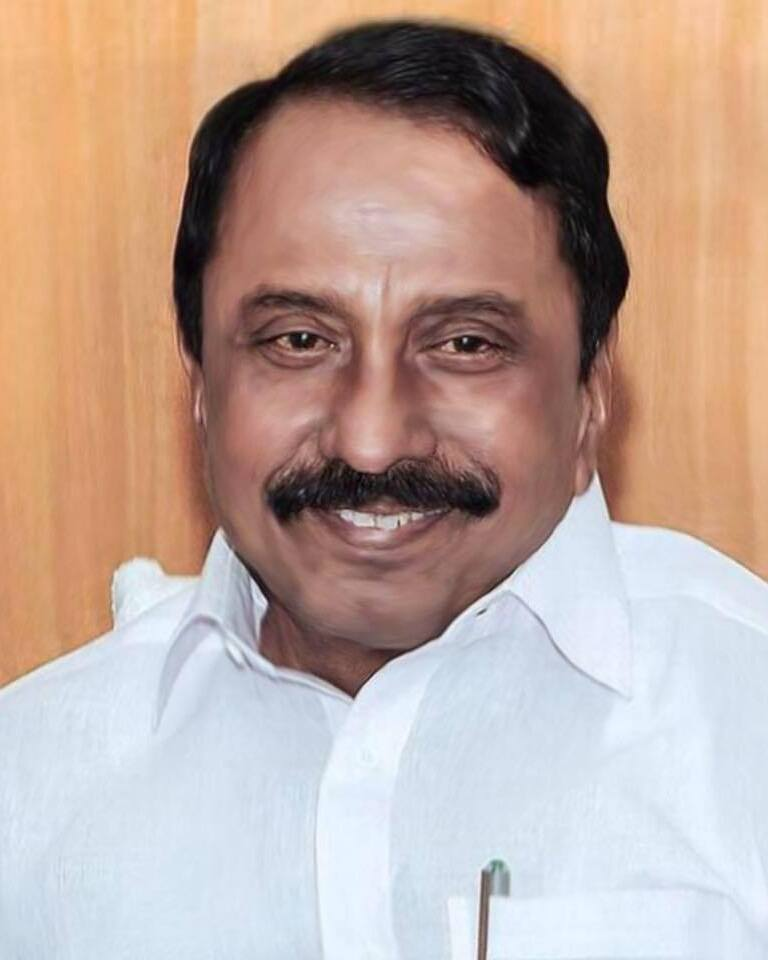
- Sengottaiyan in 2017

Cabinet Minister Government of Tamil Nadu
- Incumbent
- Assumed office 10 May 2026
- Minister: Revenue; Legislative Assembly
- Chief Minister: C. Joseph Vijay
- Preceded by: Thangam Thennarasu
- In office 17 May 2017 – 6 May 2021
- Minister: School Education; Youth Welfare and Sports Development
- Chief Minister: Edappadi K. Palaniswami
- Preceded by: K. Pandiarajan
- Succeeded by: Anbil Mahesh Poyyamozhi
- In office 26 January 2012 – 18 July 2012
- Minister: Revenue
- Chief Minister: J. Jayalalithaa
- In office 4 November 2011 – 26 January 2012
- Minister: Information Technology
- Chief Minister: J. Jayalalithaa
- In office 16 May 2011 – 4 November 2011
- Minister: Agriculture
- Chief Minister: J. Jayalalithaa
- Preceded by: Veerapandy S. Arumugam
- Succeeded by: S. Damodaran
- In office 24 June 1991 – 12 May 1996
- Minister: Transport and forest
- Chief Minister: J. Jayalalithaa

Leader of the House in Tamil Nadu Legislative Assembly
- Incumbent
- Assumed office 12 May 2026
- Chief Minister: C. Joseph Vijay
- Preceded by: Duraimurugan
- In office 14 February 2017 – 6 January 2018
- Chief Minister: Edappadi K. Palaniswami
- Preceded by: O. Panneerselvam
- Succeeded by: O. Panneerselvam

Deputy Leader of the Opposition in the Tamil Nadu Legislative Assembly
- In office 19 May 2006 – 28 May 2006
- Leader of Opposition: O. Panneerselvam
- Preceded by: Duraimurugan
- Succeeded by: O. Panneerselvam
- In office 23 June 1990 – 19 January 1991
- Leader of Opposition: S. R. Eradha
- Preceded by: Su. Thirunavukkarasar
- Succeeded by: O. Panneerselvam

Member of Tamil Nadu Legislative Assembly
- Incumbent
- Assumed office 11 May 2006
- Preceded by: S. S. Ramaneedharan
- Constituency: Gobichettipalayam
- In office 7 June 1980 – 10 May 1996
- Preceded by: N. K. K. Ramasamy
- Succeeded by: G. P. Venkidu
- Constituency: Gobichettipalayam
- In office 30 June 1977 – 17 February 1980
- Preceded by: S. K. Subramaniam
- Succeeded by: R. Rangasamy
- Constituency: Sathyamangalam

8th Presidium Chairman of All India Anna Dravida Munnetra Kazhagam
- In office 10 February 2017 – 20 August 2017
- General Secretary: V. K. Sasikala (Interim)
- Preceded by: E. Madhusudhanan
- Succeeded by: E. Madhusudhanan

Headquarters Secretary of All India Anna Dravida Munnetra Kazhagam
- In office 14 August 2006 – 18 July 2012
- General Secretary: J. Jayalalithaa
- Preceded by: D. Jayakumar
- Succeeded by: P. Palaniappan
- In office unknown – 9 June 2003
- General Secretary: J. Jayalalithaa
- Succeeded by: D. Jayakumar

Chief Coordinator of the High-level Administrative Committee, Tamilaga Vettri Kazhagam
- Incumbent
- Assumed office 27 November 2025
- President: C. Joseph Vijay
- General Secretary: N. Anand
- Preceded by: Position established

Personal details
- Born: 9 January 1948 (age 78) Kullampalayam, Madras State, India
- Party: Tamilaga Vettri Kazhagam (2025 - Present)
- Other political affiliations: All India Anna Dravida Munnetra Kazhagam (1972–2025)
- Parent: K. S. Arthanari Gounder (father)
- Education: SSLC (10th)

Kullampalayam Arthanari Sengottaiyan (born 9 January 1948), better known as K. A. Sengottaiyan, is an Indian politician from Tamil Nadu, who has been serving as a Minister for Revenue and Disaster Management in the Government of Tamil Nadu since 10 May 2026. He is also the leader of the house in the Tamil Nadu Legislative Assembly and the chief coordinator of the high level administrative committee of Tamilaga Vettri Kazhagam (TVK). He has had a long political career spanning over five decades, primarily with the All India Anna Dravida Munnetra Kazhagam (AIADMK). He was expelled from the AIADMK and later joined the TVK in November 2025.

Sengottaiyan was elected to the Tamil Nadu Legislative Assembly, for the first time during the 1977 Tamil Nadu Legislative Assembly election from Sathyamangalam constituency. He has been elected to the Tamil Nadu assembly a record ten times, including nine times from the Gobichettipalayam constituency. He has served as a Member of the Legislative Assembly from since 1977, except for a period between 1996 and 2006. In the 17th Tamil Nadu Assembly, he was the longest serving member of the assembly.

Sengottaiyan has held various portfolios as a minister in the Tamil Nadu Government. He served as the minister of transport from 1991 to 1996, minister of agriculture in 2011, minister of Information Technology from 2011 to 2012, and minister of revenue in 2012 under the chief minister-ship of J. Jayalalithaa. He later served as the minister of school education and youth welfare and sports development from May 2017 to May 2021 in the Palaniswami ministry.

Sengottaiyan served as the leader of the house in the Tamil Nadu assembly from February 2017 to January 2018. He also served as the deputy leader of opposition two times. He has also held various leadership positions with the AIADMK.

== Early life ==
K. A. Sengottaiyan (Kullampalayam Arthanari Sengottaiyan) was born on January 9, 1948, in Kullampalayam (also noted near Kambaliyampatti), Erode district, Tamil Nadu.

== Family ==
Family: Son of K. S. Arthanari Gounder, a farmer from whom he inherited close ties to the local agrarian community. He belongs to the Kongu Vellalar community.

== Political career ==
=== All India Anna Dravida Munnetra Kazhagam (1972 – 2025) ===
Sengottaiyan was elected as Member of the Legislative Assembly to the Tamil Nadu legislative assembly as an All India Anna Dravida Munnetra Kazhagam (AIADMK) candidate from Sathyamangalam constituency in 1977 election and from Gobichettipalayam constituency in 1980, 1984, 1989 (Jayalalitha faction), 1991, 2006, 2011, 2016 and 2021 in Erode district. He allegedly punched Karunanidhi in his face during a violent clash in the assembly in 1989.

Sengottaiyan was the minister for transport from 1991 to 1996 during the first cabinet of Jayalalithaa. The 1992 Vachathi incident, a case involving mass murder and destruction of property by forest and police personnel in the tribal-dominated village happened during his reign as the forest minister. He later claimed that the report of violence was fabricated.

In 2000, Sengottaiyan was convicted in two different corruption cases by the a Central Bureau of Investigation court for criminal conspiracy and criminal breach of trust involving misappropriation of transport department funds related to his role as the minister. He was sentenced to four and five years of rigorous imprisonment in the cases respectively and given a fine of ₹0.105 million (US$1,100). Because of these convictions, he was disqualified from contesting the 2001 Assembly elections. In February 2005, he was acquitted by the Madras High Court in both the cases. In November 2006, the Supreme Court of India declined to interfere with the High Court's judgment as the appeal of the Government of Tamil Nadu was filed with a delay.

From 2006 to 2012, he served as the headquarters secretary of the AIADMK. He was the minister for agriculture until November 2011 when a cabinet reshuffle by Jayalalithaa resulted in Sengottaiyan taking over the information technology portfolio. Later in 2012, he was removed from his ministerial berth, and party positions by Jayalalithaa.

After the death of Jayalalithaa on 5 December 2016, and following the appointment of Edappadi K. Palaniswami as the chief minister, Sengottaiyan was appointed as the minister for school education in February 2017. The appointment of Sengottaiyan was the only change made to the cabinet by Palaniswami at that time.

In September 2025, Sengottaiyan urged the party general secretary Palaniswami to take steps to reunite expelled and dissenting leaders to restore the party's strength ahead of the 2026 Tamil Nadu Assembly election. On 6 September 2025, he was removed from his party posts by Palaniswami. He subsequently met union ministers Amit Shah and Nirmala Sitharaman in New Delhi on 10 September 2025, where he discussed unifying and strengthening the AIADMK. On 31 October 2025, he was expelled from the AIADMK under the allegation that he had accompanied expelled leaders O. Panneerselvam and T. T. V. Dhinakaran to Pasumpon for the Thevar Jayanthi ceremony.

=== Tamilaga Vettri Kazhagam (2025–present) ===
After Sengottaiyan was expelled from the AIADMK, he resigned as the member of the legislative assembly on 26 November 2025. He joined the Tamilaga Vettri Kazhagam in the presence of its leader Vijay and was appointed as the chief coordinator of the party's high-level administrative committee, and additionally as the organisation secretary for four western districts–Coimbatore, Erode, Tiruppur, and the Nilgiris on 27 November 2025. In the 2026 Tamil Nadu Legislative Assembly election, he was elected for a record tenth time to the state assembly, and was appointed as a cabinet minister in the Joseph Vijay ministry. On 12 May 2026, he was named as the leader of the house in the assembly.

== Elections contested and results ==
=== Tamil Nadu Legislative Assembly elections ===
Year	Constituency	Party	Votes	%	Opponent	Party	Votes	%	Result	Margin	%
2026	Gobichettipalayam	TVK	82,612	37.60	N. Nallasivam	DMK	65,992	30.03	Won	+16,620	+7.57
2021	Gobichettipalayam	ADMK	108,608	51.00	G. V. Manimaran	DMK	80,045	37.58	Won	+28,563	+13.42
2016	Gobichettipalayam	ADMK	96,177	47.00	S. V. Saravanan	INC	84,954	41.52	Won	+11,223	+5.48
2011	Gobichettipalayam	ADMK	94,872	54.47	N. S. Sivaraj	KNMK	52,960	30.40	Won	+41,912	+24.07
2006	Gobichettipalayam	ADMK	55,181	45.41	G. V. Manimaran	DMK	51,162	42.10	Won	+4,019	+3.31
1996	Gobichettipalayam	ADMK	45,254	40.63	G. P. Venkidu	DMK	59,983	53.86	Lost	-14,729	-13.23
1991	Gobichettipalayam	ADMK	66,423	68.18	Shanmoga Sundaram	DMK	27,211	27.93	Won	+39,212	+40.25
1989	Gobichettipalayam	ADMK	37,187	38.14	T. Geetha	JP	22,943	23.53	Won	+14,244	+14.61
1984	Gobichettipalayam	ADMK	56,884	63.08	M. Andamuthu	DMK	31,879	35.35	Won	+25,005	+27.73
1980	Gobichettipalayam	ADMK	44,703	59.38	K. M. Subramaniam	INC	29,690	39.44	Won	+15,013	+19.94
1977	Sathyamangalam	ADMK	21,145	35.81	C. R. Rajappa	INC	19,639	33.26	Won	+1,506	+2.55
