= G. P. Venkidu =

Indian politician (1935–2020)

- ஜி. பி. வெங்கிடு
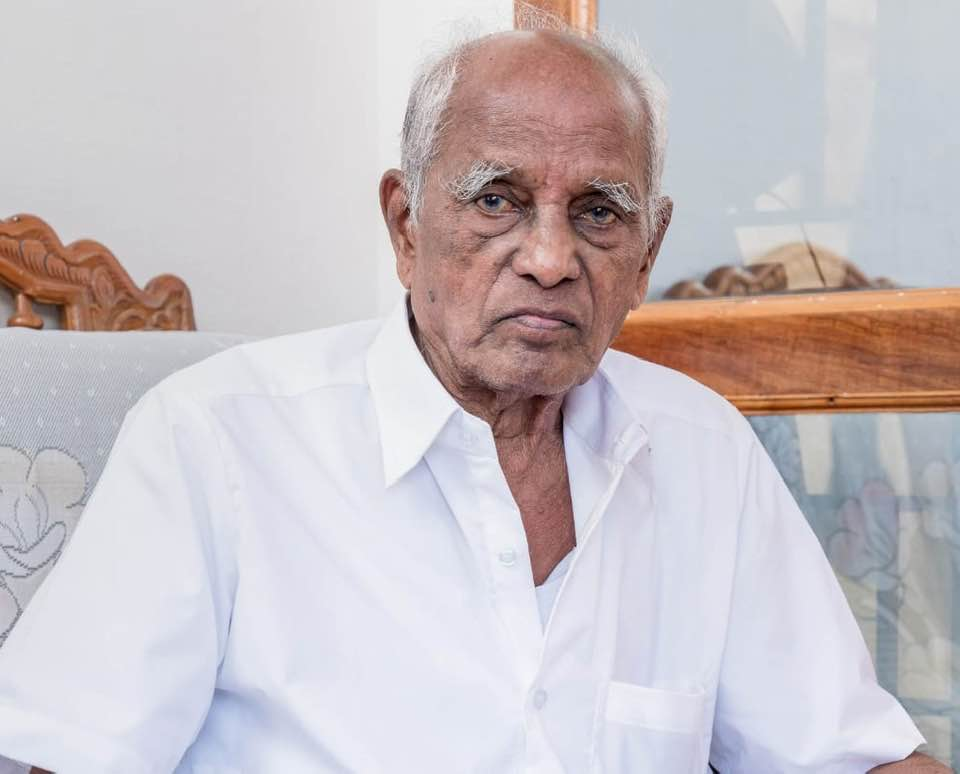
- Venkidu in or before September 2020

Member of the Tamil Nadu Legislative Assembly
- In office 13 May 1996 – 13 May 2001
- Preceded by: K. A. Sengottaiyan
- Succeeded by: S. S. Ramaneedharan
- Constituency: Gobichettipalayam

Personal details
- Born: 1935
- Died: 23 September 2020 (aged 84–85) Coimbatore, Tamil Nadu, India
- Political party: Dravida Munnetra Kazhagam
- Death cause: COVID-19 pandemic in Tamil Nadu

G. P. Venkidu (1935 – 23 September 2020) was an Indian politician who was elected to the Tamil Nadu Legislative Assembly from the Gobichettipalayam constituency in the 1996 elections. He was a candidate of the Dravida Munnetra Kazhagam (DMK) party. He served until 2001. He died at a private hospital in Coimbatore aged 85 of COVID-19.
