= S. M. Palaniappan =

Member of the Legislative Assembly
- Constituency: Gobichettipalayam
- In office 1971–1976

Personal details
- Born: 1930 (age 95–96) Savandapur, Gobichettipalayam, Tamil Nadu, India
- Party: Dravida Munnetra Kazhagam
- Children: 3

Savandapur Muthu Gounder Palaniappan (born 1930), better known as S. M. Palaniappan (Tamil: ச.மு.பழனியப்பன்), is a former Member of the Legislative Assembly of Tamil Nadu. He was elected to the Tamil Nadu legislative assembly as a Dravida Munnetra Kazhagam candidate from Gobichettipalayam constituency in 1971. He served under two different Chief Ministers Annadurai and Karunanidhi.

== Personal life ==
Palaniappan was born in 1930 as the eldest son of Muthu Gounder in Savandapur village, Gobichettipalayam. He hailed from a family with predominant agricultural background and lost his mother at an early age. He worked hard to become a doctor by profession. He has a younger brother, S .M. Kandappan, a lawyer by profession and three other sisters. He does great service to the community through his profession and he continues to serve people even after 80 years of age with no/minimum fee.
