= Elections in Tamil Nadu =

Overview of the procedure of elections in the Indian state of Tamil Nadu

Elections in the Indian state of Tamil Nadu are conducted every five years to elect members to the Tamil Nadu Legislative Assembly and members of parliament to the Lok Sabha. There are 234 assembly constituencies and 39 Lok Sabha constituencies. The state has conducted 17 assembly elections and 18 Lok Sabha elections since independence.

The governor of Tamil Nadu is the ceremonial head of the state. However, it is the chief minister of Tamil Nadu who is elected as the leader of the party or political alliance having a majority in the Tamil Nadu Legislative Assembly. The chief minister will be the leader of the executive branch of the government of Tamil Nadu. The chief minister is the chief adviser to the governor of Tamil Nadu and the head of the state council of ministers.

== Elections ==
The Election Commission of India (ECI) is responsible for monitoring and administering the elections for the Rajya Sabha (Council of States) and Lok Sabha (House of the People) of the Parliament and the Tamil Nadu Legislative Assembly. The ECI appoints the chief electoral officer of Tamil Nadu, an I.A.S. officer who oversees state-level election matters.

The Tamil Nadu Election Commission is the state body of Tamil Nadu that is enacted under the provisions of the constitution and is responsible for monitoring and administering the elections for local government in Tamil Nadu. This body is responsible for ensuring elections are free and fair, without any bias.

Elections ensure the conduct of members pre-elections, during elections, and post-elections is as per statutory legislation.

The election commission handles all election-related disputes. If the laws enacted to deal with the given situation in conducting elections are silent or do not make adequate provisions, the Madras High Court has ruled that the Election Commission has residual powers to act appropriately under the constitution.

== Types of elections ==
Elections in Tamil Nadu include elections for:

- Members of Parliament in the Rajya Sabha (Upper House)
- Members of Parliament in the Lok Sabha (Lower House)
- Members of the Tamil Nadu Legislative Assembly
- Members of local governance bodies (municipal bodies and panchayats)
- A bye-election is held when the elected member of a particular constituency dies, resigns, or is disqualified.

== Rajya Sabha elections ==
Members of parliament in the Rajya Sabha (Council of States) from Tamil Nadu are not directly elected by being voted upon by all adult citizens of the state but by the members of the Tamil Nadu Legislative Assembly. Candidates who win the Rajya Sabha elections are called "Members of Parliament" and hold their seats for six years. The house meets in the Rajya Sabha Chamber of the Sansad Bhavan in New Delhi on matters relating to the creation of new laws or removing or improving the existing laws that affect all citizens of India. Elections take place to elect 18 members from Tamil Nadu.

== Lok Sabha elections ==
Members of parliament in the Lok Sabha (House of the People) from Tamil Nadu are directly elected by being voted upon by all adult citizens of the state from a set of candidates who stand in their respective constituencies. Every adult citizen of India can vote only in their constituency. Candidates who win the Lok Sabha elections are called "Members of Parliament" and hold their seats for five years or until the body is dissolved by the president of India on the advice of the council of ministers. The house meets in the Lok Sabha Chamber of the Sansad Bhavan in New Delhi on matters relating to the creation of new laws or removing or improving the existing laws that affect all citizens of India. Elections take place once every five years to elect 39 members from Tamil Nadu.

Lok Sabha election results
6th Lok Sabha (1977)	7th Lok Sabha (1980)	8th Lok Sabha (1984)	9th Lok Sabha (1989)	10th Lok Sabha (1991)	11th Lok Sabha (1996)	12th Lok Sabha (1998)	13th Lok Sabha (1999)	14th Lok Sabha (2004)	15th Lok Sabha (2009)	16th Lok Sabha (2014)	17th Lok Sabha (2019)	18th Lok Sabha (2024)

=== History of Lok Sabha elections ===
Colour key for parties
All India Anna Dravida Munnetra Kazhagam
Bharatiya Janata Party
Communist Party of India
Communist Party of India (Marxist)
Dravida Munnetra Kazhagam
Independent
Indian National Congress
Indian National Congress (Indira)
Indian National Congress (Organisation)
Pattali Makkal Katchi
Swatantra Party
Tamil Maanila Congress (Moopanar)

LOK SABHA ELECTIONS
Lok Sabha (Election)	Total Seats	First			Second			Third		
Lok Sabha (Election)	Total Seats	Political party	Seats	Percentage of votes	Political party	Seats	Percentage of votes	Political party	Seats	Percentage of votes
1st (1951)	75	Indian National Congress	35	36.39%	Independent	15	23.15%	Communist Party of India	8	8.95%
2nd (1957)	41	Indian National Congress	31	46.52%	Independent	8	39.77%	Communist Party of India	2	10.06%
3rd (1962)	41	Indian National Congress	31	45.26%	Dravida Munnetra Kazhagam	7	18.64%	Communist Party of India	2	10.24%
4th (1967)	39	Dravida Munnetra Kazhagam	25	35.78%	Swatantra Party	6	9.16%	Communist Party of India (Marxist)	4	6.85%
5th (1971)	39	Dravida Munnetra Kazhagam	23	35.25%	Indian National Congress	9	12.51%	Communist Party of India	4	5.43%
6th (1977)	39	All India Anna Dravida Munnetra Kazhagam	17	30.04%	Indian National Congress	14	22.27%	Indian National Congress (Organisation)	3	17.67%
7th (1980)	39	Indian National Congress (Indira)	20	31.62%	Dravida Munnetra Kazhagam	16	23.01%	All India Anna Dravida Munnetra Kazhagam	2	25.38%
8th (1984)	39	Indian National Congress	25	40.51%	All India Anna Dravida Munnetra Kazhagam	12	18.36%	Dravida Munnetra Kazhagam	2	25.90%
9th (1989)	39	Indian National Congress	27	39.86%	All India Anna Dravida Munnetra Kazhagam	11	17.12%	Communist Party of India	1	2.04%
10th (1991)	39	Indian National Congress	28	42.57%	All India Anna Dravida Munnetra Kazhagam	11	18.10%	Vacant	Steady	Steady
11th (1996)	39	Tamil Maanila Congress (Moopanar)	20	27.00%	Dravida Munnetra Kazhagam	17	25.63%	Communist Party of India	2	2.33%
12th (1998)	39	All India Anna Dravida Munnetra Kazhagam	18	25.89%	Dravida Munnetra Kazhagam	5	20.08%	Pattali Makkal Katchi	4	6.05%
13th (1999)	39	Dravida Munnetra Kazhagam	12	23.13%	All India Anna Dravida Munnetra Kazhagam	10	25.68%	Pattali Makkal Katchi	5	8.21%
14th (2004)	39	Dravida Munnetra Kazhagam	16	24.60%	Indian National Congress	10	14.40%	Pattali Makkal Katchi	5	6.71%
15th (2009)	39	Dravida Munnetra Kazhagam	18	25.09%	All India Anna Dravida Munnetra Kazhagam	9	22.88%	Indian National Congress	8	15.03%
16th (2014)	39	All India Anna Dravida Munnetra Kazhagam	37	44.92%	Bharatiya Janata Party	1	5.56%	Pattali Makkal Katchi	1	4.51%
17th (2019)	39	Dravida Munnetra Kazhagam	24	33.52%	Indian National Congress	8	12.62%	Communist Party of India	2	2.40%
18th (2024)	39	Dravida Munnetra Kazhagam	22	26.93%	Indian National Congress	9	10.67%	Communist Party of India (Marxist)	2	2.52%

== Legislative Assembly elections ==
Members of the Tamil Nadu Legislative Assembly are directly elected by being voted upon by all adult citizens of the state from a set of candidates who stand in their respective constituencies. Every adult citizen of India can vote only in their constituency. Candidates who win the legislative assembly elections are called "Members of the Legislative Assembly" and hold their seats for five years or until the body is dissolved by the governor of Tamil Nadu on the advice of the council of ministers. The house meets in the Assembly Chamber of the Chief Secretariat in Chennai on matters relating to the creation of new laws or removing or improving the existing laws that affect all citizens of Tamil Nadu. Elections take place once every five years to elect 234 members to the legislative assembly. The leader of the majority party or alliance takes oath as chief minister of Tamil Nadu.

Legislative Assembly election results
6th Assembly (1977)	7th Assembly (1980)	8th Assembly (1984)	9th Assembly (1989)	10th Assembly (1991)	11th Assembly (1996)	12th Assembly (2001)	13th Assembly (2006)	14th Assembly (2011)	15th Assembly (2016)	16th Assembly (2021)	17th Assembly (2026)

=== History of Legislative Assembly elections ===
Colour key for parties
All India Anna Dravida Munnetra Kazhagam
Communist Party of India
Desiya Murpokku Dravida Kazhagam
Dravida Munnetra Kazhagam
Independent
Indian National Congress
Indian National Congress (Indira)
Indian National Congress (Organisation)
Swatantra Party
Tamil Maanila Congress (Moopanar)
Tamilaga Vettri Kazhagam

LEGISLATIVE ASSEMBLY ELECTIONS
Assembly (Election)	Total Seats	First			Second			Third		
Assembly (Election)	Total Seats	Political party	Seats	Percentage of votes	Political party	Seats	Percentage of votes	Political party	Seats	Percentage of votes
1st (1952)	375	Indian National Congress	152	34.88%	Communist Party of India	62	13.18%	Independent	62	23.75%
2nd (1957)	205	Indian National Congress	151	45.34%	Independent	48	44.62%	Communist Party of India	4	7.40%
3rd (1962)	206	Indian National Congress	139	46.14%	Dravida Munnetra Kazhagam	50	27.10%	Swatantra Party	6	7.82%
4th (1967)	234	Dravida Munnetra Kazhagam	137	40.69%	Indian National Congress	51	41.10%	Swatantra Party	20	5.30%
5th (1971)	234	Dravida Munnetra Kazhagam	184	48.58%	Indian National Congress (Organisation)	15	34.99%	Communist Party of India	8	2.32%
6th (1977)	234	All India Anna Dravida Munnetra Kazhagam	130	30.36%	Dravida Munnetra Kazhagam	48	24.89%	Indian National Congress	27	17.50%
7th (1980)	234	All India Anna Dravida Munnetra Kazhagam	129	38.75%	Dravida Munnetra Kazhagam	37	22.10%	Indian National Congress (Indira)	31	20.92%
8th (1984)	234	All India Anna Dravida Munnetra Kazhagam	132	37.03%	Indian National Congress	61	16.28%	Dravida Munnetra Kazhagam	24	29.34%
9th (1989)	234	Dravida Munnetra Kazhagam	150	33.18%	All India Anna Dravida Munnetra Kazhagam	29	21.77%	Indian National Congress	26	19.83%
10th (1991)	234	All India Anna Dravida Munnetra Kazhagam	164	44.39%	Indian National Congress	60	15.19%	Dravida Munnetra Kazhagam	2	22.46%
11th (1996)	234	Dravida Munnetra Kazhagam	173	42.07%	Tamil Maanila Congress (Moopanar)	39	9.30%	Communist Party of India	8	2.12%
12th (2001)	234	All India Anna Dravida Munnetra Kazhagam	132	31.44%	Dravida Munnetra Kazhagam	31	30.92%	Tamil Maanila Congress (Moopanar)	23	6.73%
13th (2006)	234	Dravida Munnetra Kazhagam	96	26.46%	All India Anna Dravida Munnetra Kazhagam	61	32.64%	Indian National Congress	34	8.38%
14th (2011)	234	All India Anna Dravida Munnetra Kazhagam	150	38.40%	Desiya Murpokku Dravida Kazhagam	29	7.88%	Dravida Munnetra Kazhagam	23	22.39%
15th (2016)	234	All India Anna Dravida Munnetra Kazhagam	136	41.06%	Dravida Munnetra Kazhagam	89	31.86%	Indian National Congress	8	6.42%
16th (2021)	234	Dravida Munnetra Kazhagam	133	37.70%	All India Anna Dravida Munnetra Kazhagam	66	33.29%	Indian National Congress	18	4.27%
17th (2026)	234	Tamilaga Vettri Kazhagam	108	34.92%	Dravida Munnetra Kazhagam	59	24.19%	All India Anna Dravida Munnetra Kazhagam	47	21.21%

== Bye-election ==
When an elected member of the Rajya Sabha, Lok Sabha, or Tamil Nadu Legislative Assembly left their office vacant before their term ended, a bye-election was conducted to find a suitable replacement to fill the vacant position.

Common reasons for bye-elections:

- Resignation of the sitting M.P. or an M.L.A.
- Death of the sitting M.P. or an M.L.A.

There are also other reasons that occur when the incumbent is disqualified for being ineligible to continue in office (criminal conviction, failure to maintain a minimum level of attendance in the office due to election irregularities found later, or when a candidate wins more than one seat and has to vacate one).

== See also ==
- Lok Sabha
- Rajya Sabha
- Elections in India
- Parliament of India
- History of Tamil Nadu
- Politics of Tamil Nadu
- Government of Tamil Nadu
- Tamil Nadu Legislative Assembly
- Local Body Election in Tamil Nadu
