= Periyakodiveri =

- Panchayat town
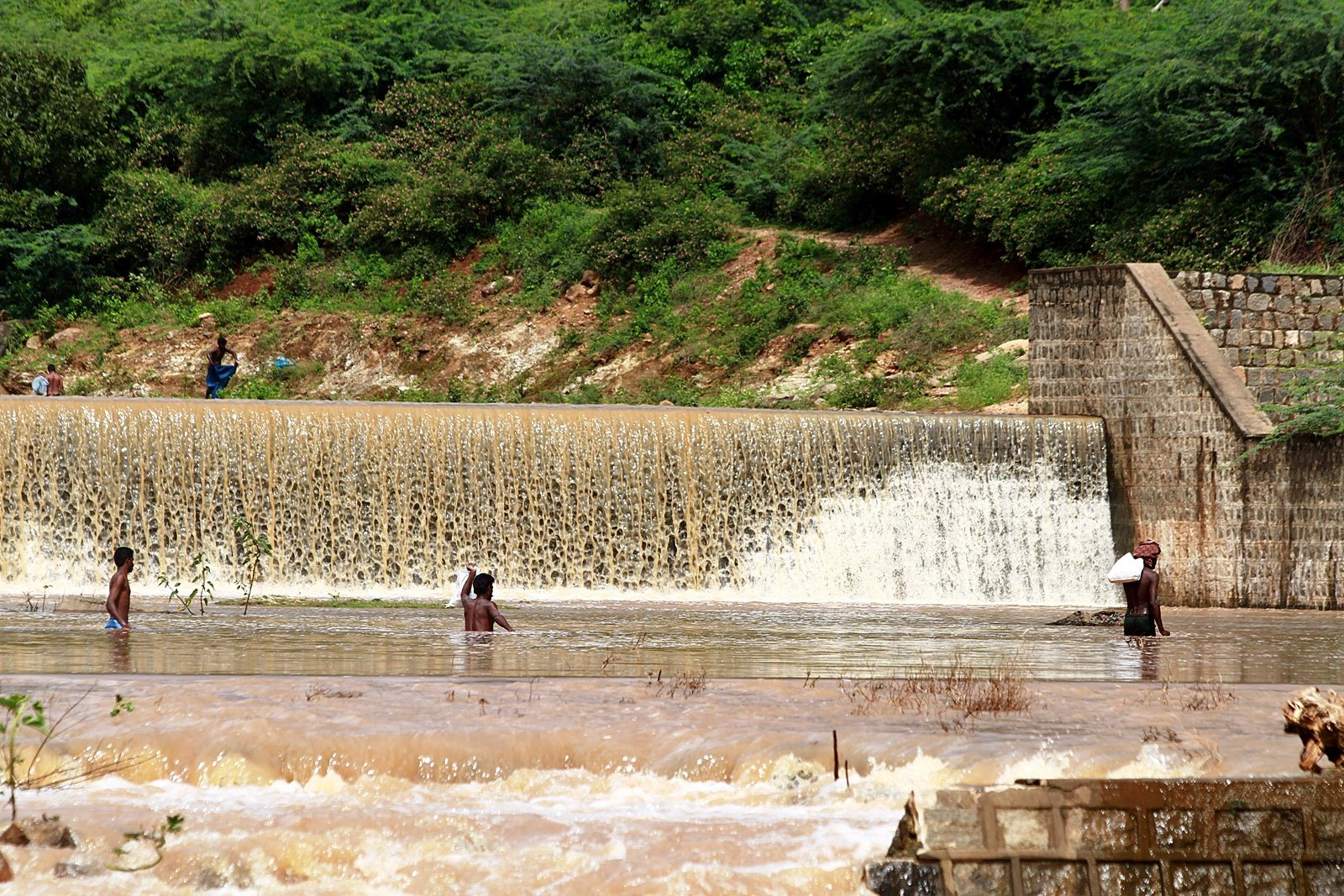
- Kodiveri Dam near Periyakodiveri

- Location in Tamil Nadu, India
- Coordinates: 11°30′5″N 77°17′53″E
- Country: India
- State: Tamil Nadu
- District: Erode

Area
  - Total: 12.4 km^{2} (4.8 sq mi)

Population (2011)
  - Total: 12,330
  - Density: 994/km^{2} (2,580/sq mi)

Languages
  - Official: Tamil
- Time zone: UTC+5:30 (IST)

Periyakodiveri is a panchayat town in Gobichettipalayam taluk of Erode district in the Indian state of Tamil Nadu. It is located in the north-western part of the state. Spread across an area of 12.4 km^{2} (4.8 sq mi), it had a population of 12,330 individuals as per the 2011 census. The Kodiveri Dam on the Bhavani River separates Periyakodiveri from Akkaraikodiveri.

== Geography and administration ==
Periyakodiveri is located in Gobichettipalayam taluk, Gobichettipalayam division of Erode district in the Indian state of Tamil Nadu. Spread across an area of 12.4 km^{2} (4.8 sq mi), it is one of the 42 panchayat towns in the district. It is located in the north-western part of the state towards the southern end of the Indian peninsula. The Kodiveri Dam is located on the Bhavani River between Periyakodiveri and Akkaraikodiveri.

The town panchayat is headed by a chairperson, who is elected by the members, who are chosen through direct elections. The town forms part of the Gobichettipalayam Assembly constituency that elects its member to the Tamil Nadu legislative assembly and the Tiruppur Lok Sabha constituency that elects its member to the Parliament of India.

== Demographics ==
As per the 2011 census, Periyakodiveri had a population of 12,330 individuals across 3,644 households. The population saw a marginal decrease compared to the previous census in 2001 when 12,405 inhabitants were registered. The population consisted of 6,181 males and 6,149 females. About 1,027 individuals were below the age of six years. The entire population is classified as urban. The town has an average literacy rate of 68%. About 23.3% of the population belonged to scheduled castes.

About 57.7% of the eligible population were employed, of which majority were involved in agriculture and allied activities. Hinduism was the majority religion which was followed by 93% of the population, with Christianity (6.3%) and Islam (0.7%) being minor religions.
