= Tamil Nadu Legislature =

Legislature of the Indian state of Tamil Nadu

Type
- Type: Unicameral

Leadership
- Speaker: J. C. D. Prabhakar, TVK since 12 May 2026
- Deputy Speaker: M. Ravisankar, TVK since 12 May 2026
- Chief Minister: C. Joseph Vijay, TVK since 10 May 2026
- Leader of the Opposition: Udhayanidhi Stalin, DMK since 10 May 2026
- Deputy Leader of the Opposition: K. N. Nehru

Structure
- Seats: 234
- Political groups: Government (146) TVK+ (116): TVK (107); INC (5); VCK (2); IUML (2); Confidence and supply (4): CPI(M) (2) (Note: CPI and CPI(M) continued participation in the SPA along with providing outside support to the TVK-led government.); CPI (2); IND (1) (Note: S. Kamaraj was expelled from AMMK.); Official Opposition (60); SPA (60): DMK (59); DMDK (1); Other Opposition (46); AIADMK+ (46): AIADMK (41); PMK (4); BJP (1); Others (1): Vacant (1)

Elections
- Voting system: First-past-the-post
- Last election: 23 April 2021
- Next election: 2031

Meeting place
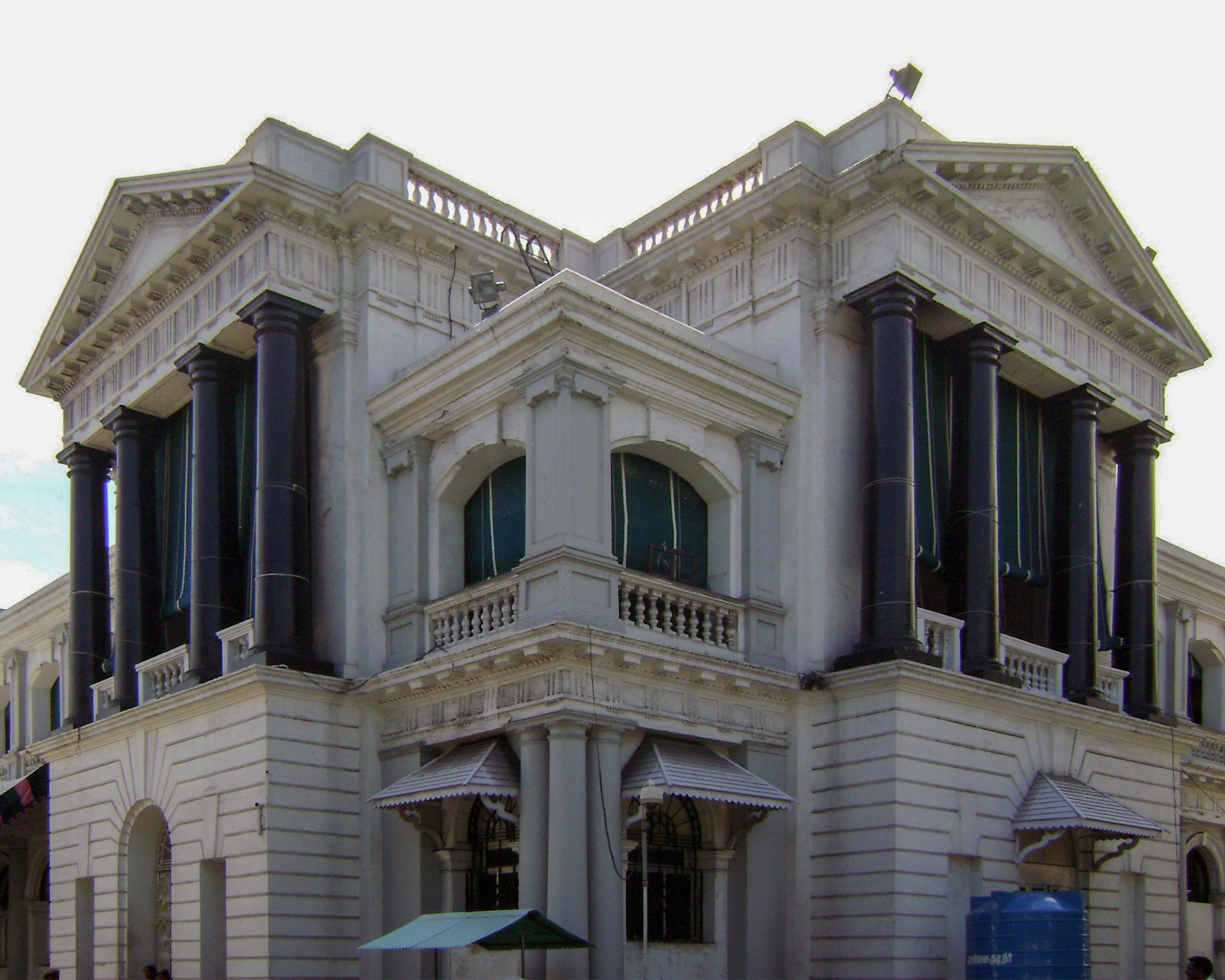
- Fort St. George, Tamil Nadu Legislature Hall

Website
- Tamil Nadu Legislative Assembly

Footnotes
- The Assembly was established in 1937 for the Madras Presidency. The Presidency became Madras State in the Republic of India in 1950; Madras State in its current state was formed in 1956 and renamed as Tamil Nadu on 14 January 1969

The Tamil Nadu Legislature is the unicameral legislature of the Indian state of Tamil Nadu. The Legislature is composed of the Tamil Nadu Legislative Assembly and the state's governor.

Until 1 November 1986, the Tamil Nadu Legislature was a bicameral legislature which included the Tamil Nadu Legislative Council as the upper house, with the Legislative Assembly being the lower house.

In 2010, the erstwhile Dravida Munnetra Kazhagam government took steps to revive the Tamil Nadu Legislative Council and convert the legislature back into a bicameral one, but the administration lost power before completing the transition. The All India Anna Dravida Munnetra Kazhagam government which assumed power in 2011 expressed its intent not to revive the Legislative Council.

== See also ==
- Elections in Tamil Nadu
- Government of Tamil Nadu
