= Savandapur =

- town panchayat
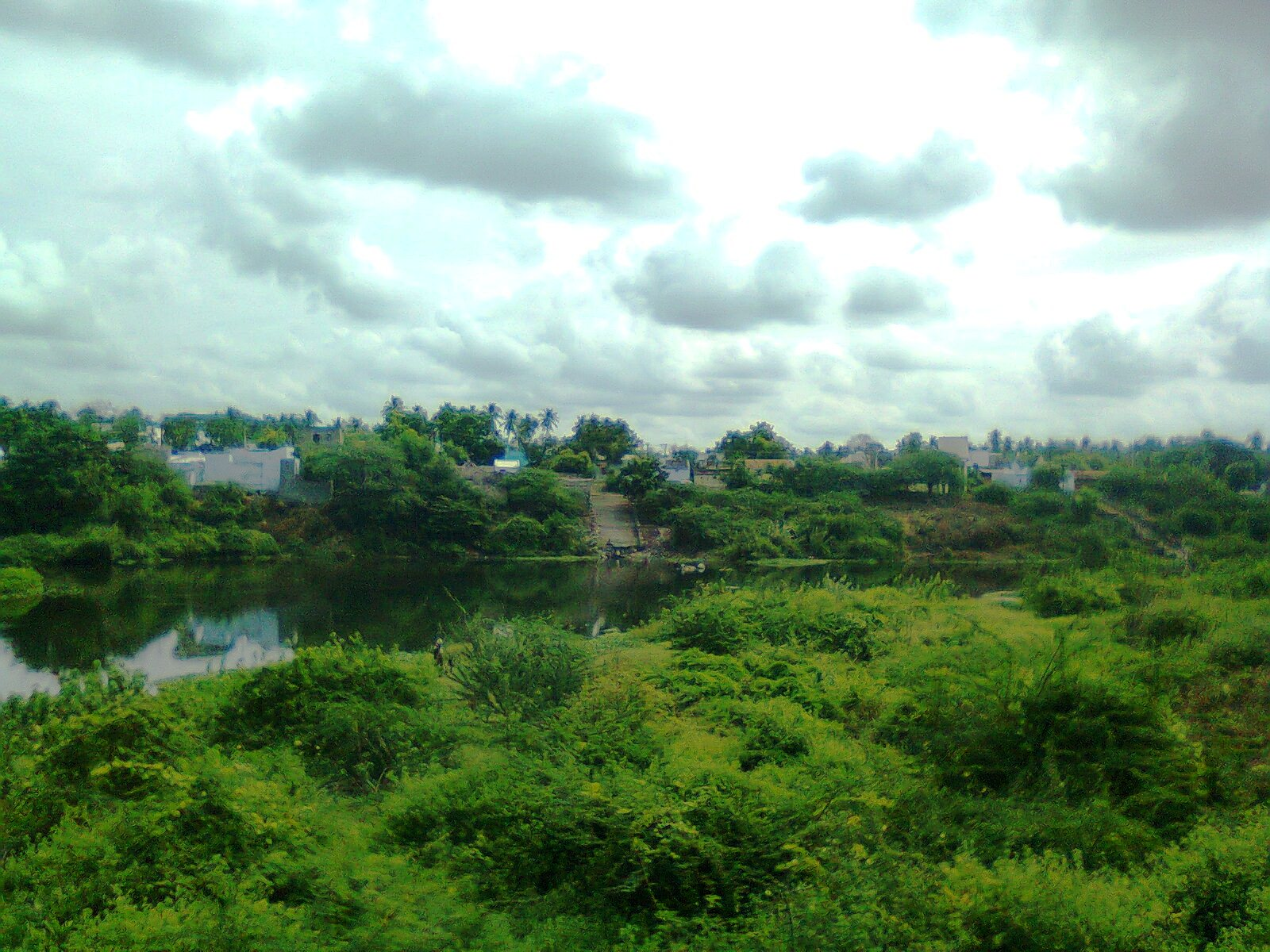
- Bhavani River as seen from Savandapur with Athani on the other side

- Location in Tamil Nadu, India Savandapur (India)
- Coordinates: 11°34′17″N 77°30′39″E
- Country: India
- State: Tamil Nadu
- Region: Coimbatore (Kongu Nadu)
- District: Erode

Government
  - Member of Legislative Assembly: S. S. Ramanitharan
  - Member of Parliament: C. Sivasamy

Population (2011)
  - Total: 3,743

Languages
  - Official: Tamil
- Time zone: UTC+5:30 (IST)
- PIN: 638502
- Telephone code: 91(04256)
- Lok Sabha constituency: Tirupur
- Vidhan Sabha constituency: Anthiyur

Savandapur is a panchayat in Gobichettipalayam taluk in Erode District of Tamil Nadu state, India. It is about 10 kilometres (6.2 mi) from Gobichettipalayam and 35 kilometres (22 mi) from district headquarters Erode.

== Location ==
Savandapur is located on the banks of River Bhavani with Athani located on the other side of it. There are two bridges across the river that connect Savandapur with Athani. Savandapur lies along the major district road (MDR) connecting Gobichettipalayam with Anthiyur.

== Demographics ==
It has a population of about 3,743 with over 1,325 households. Kongu Vellalar families maintain a dominant position in the village and the surrounding area.

== Temples ==
The famous Pariyur Kondathu Kaliamman temple is 8 kilometres (5.0 mi) from Savandapur. The other famous temples in and around Savandapur are Karungaradu Murugan Temple, Arulmigu Selliandi Amman Temple, Arulmigu Poonthottathu Aiyan Temple, Arulmigu Vinayagar and Selva Mariamman Temple, and Arulmigu Vayal Karuppsamy Temple.
