= S. V. Saravanan =

Indian politician

S V Saravanan
- எஸ் வி சரவணன்
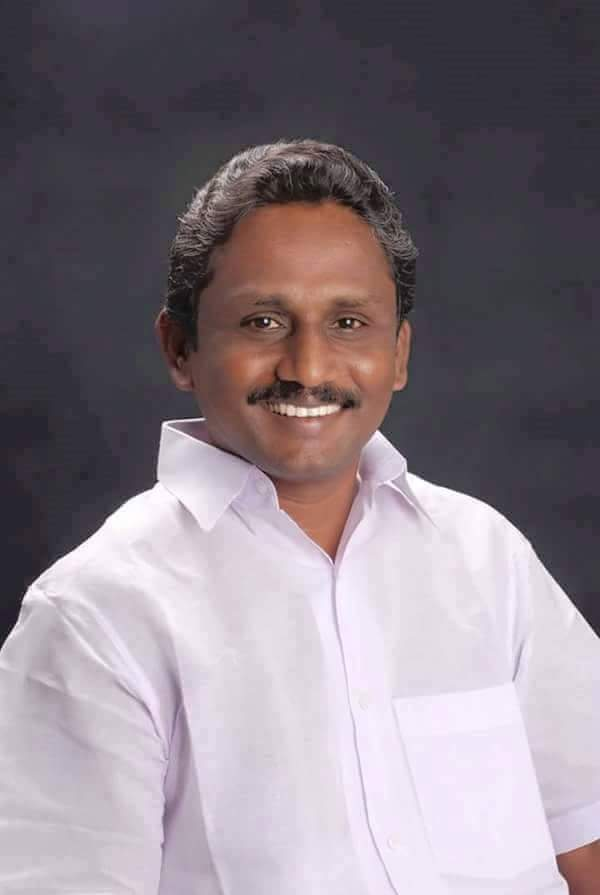

Personal details
- Born: 8 January 1964 (age 62)
- Party: Indian National Congress
- Parents: S R Venkatachalam; V Lakshmi

Sokkumaripalayam Venkatachalam Saravanan (also known as SVS) is an Indian politician representing the Gobichettipalayam constituency in the Erode district, Tamil Nadu. He is a member of the Indian National Congress party.

He was chosen as the party's candidate for the 2016 State Assembly election by Tamil Nadu Congress Chief E. V. K. S. Elangovan and Indian National Congress President Rahul Gandhi.

== Early life and education ==
Saravanan was born in 1964 to Venkatachalam and Lakshmi. He is from an agricultural family from the remove village of Sokkumaripalayam, near Gobichettipalayam in Tamil Nadu.

His grandfather, K.R. Raju Gounder, held the post of president of Nambiyur.

Saravanan holds a Diploma in Mechanical Engineering.

== Political career ==
He is a follower of Gandhism and a devotee of the independence activist and politician K. Kamaraj. Because he leads a simple life, he is referred to as "namma ooru kamarajar (நம்ம ஊரு காமராஜர்)" by his friends and people around him.

=== Elected positions ===
Saravanan's first elected post was Panchayat Union Chairman, Nambiyur Union, Gobichettipalayam Assembly, Erode District from 1996 to 2001.

He was elected Panchayat Union Counselor, Gobichettipalayam Assembly from 2001 to 2006; then Chairman of the District Panchayat for Erode North, Gobichettipalayam Assembly from 2006 to 2011.

=== Public posts ===
His public posts have included:

- Library Association President, Diamond Jubilee Higher Secondary School, Gobichettipalayam, 1980
- Chairman, Sakthi Polytechnic College, Sakthi Nagar, Gobichettipalayam, 1982
- PCC Member, Tamil Nadu Congress Committee, 2001 to 2011
