= P. G. Karuthiruman =

Indian politician

5th Leader of Opposition in the Tamil Nadu Legislative Assembly
- In office 15 March 1967 – 5 January 1971
- Preceded by: V. R. Nedunchezhiyan
- Succeeded by: M. Karunanidhi
- Constituency: Sathyamangalam

P. G. Karuthiruman was an Indian politician who served as the 5th leader of the opposition in the Tamil Nadu Legislative Assembly. He served in the position from 15 March 1967 to 5 January 1971, and was holding the post when the Madras State was renamed as Tamil Nadu in January 1969.

Karuthiruman was elected to the Madras State Assembly after he won the 1952 Madras State Legislative Assembly election as an Indian National Congress candidate from Nambiyur. He was re-elected to the assembly from Gobichettipalayam Assembly constituency in 1957 and from Sathyamangalam in 1967.
