= V. C. Palanisami Gounder =

Indian merchant and politician

Minister in charge of Veterinary, Animal Husbandry and Harijan Welfare
- In office 9 October 1953 – 12 April 1954
- Chief Minister: K. Kamaraj

Minister in charge of Prohibition
- In office 10 April 1952 – 31 September 1953
- Chief Minister: C. Rajagopalachari

Member of the Madras Legislative Assembly
- In office 1952–1957
- Preceded by: Office established
- Succeeded by: Constituency didn't exist in 1957
- Constituency: Tondamuttur

Personal details
- Died: 15 April 1965
- Party: Indian National Congress

V. C. Palanisamy Gounder (died 15 April 1965) was an Indian merchant and politician of the Indian National Congress who served as Minister of Prohibition of the Madras State in the cabinet of C. Rajagopalachari and Minister for Animal Husbandry and Harijan Welfare in K. Kamaraj's cabinet.

== Biography ==
A native of Coimbatore, Gounder hailed from a family of wealthy textile merchants. In 1937, Gounder was nominated to the Madras Legislative Council representing cotton-growers of the province. Gounder died on 15 April 1965.
