= O. Panneerselvam =

Former chief minister of Tamil Nadu (born 1951)

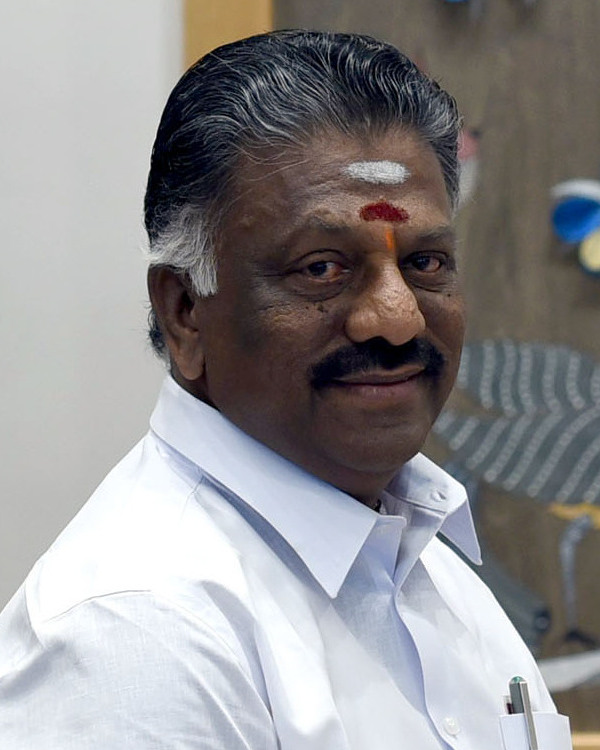
- Panneerselvam in 2017

6th Chief Minister of Tamil Nadu
- In office 6 December 2016 – 16 February 2017
- Governor: C. Vidyasagar Rao
- Cabinet: Panneerselvam III
- Preceded by: J. Jayalalithaa
- Succeeded by: Edappadi K. Palaniswami
- In office 28 September 2014 – 23 May 2015
- Governor: Konijeti Rosaiah
- Cabinet: Panneerselvam II
- Preceded by: J. Jayalalithaa
- Succeeded by: J. Jayalalithaa
- In office 21 September 2001 – 2 March 2002
- Governor: C. Rangarajan; P. S. Ramamohan Rao
- Cabinet: Panneerselvam I
- Preceded by: J. Jayalalithaa
- Succeeded by: J. Jayalalithaa

2nd Deputy Chief Minister of Tamil Nadu
- In office 21 August 2017 – 7 May 2021
- Chief Minister: Edappadi K. Palaniswami
- Preceded by: M. K. Stalin (2009)
- Succeeded by: Udhayanidhi Stalin (2024)

Deputy Leader of the Opposition in the Tamil Nadu Legislative Assembly
- In office 11 May 2021 – 14 February 2024
- Leader of Opposition: Edappadi K. Palaniswami
- Preceded by: Durai Murugan
- Succeeded by: R. B. Udhayakumar

Member of the Tamil Nadu Legislative Assembly
- Incumbent
- Assumed office 16 May 2011
- Preceded by: S. Lakshmanan
- Constituency: Bodinayakkanur
- In office 14 May 2001 – 15 May 2011
- Preceded by: L. Mookiah
- Succeeded by: A. Laser
- Constituency: Periyakulam

Coordinator of All India Anna Dravida Munnetra Kazhagam
- In office 21 August 2017 – 23 June 2022
- Deputy: K. P. Munusamy; R. Vaithilingam
- Joint Coordinator: Edappadi K. Palaniswami
- Preceded by: Position established
- Succeeded by: Position abolished

Treasurer of All India Anna Dravida Munnetra Kazhagam
- In office 22 August 2017 – 11 July 2022
- Coordinators: Himself; Edappadi K. Palaniswami
- Preceded by: Dindigul C. Srinivasan
- Succeeded by: Dindigul C. Srinivasan
- In office 28 August 2007 – 14 February 2017
- General Secretary: J. Jayalalithaa; V. K. Sasikala (acting)
- Preceded by: T. T. V. Dhinakaran
- Succeeded by: Dindigul C. Srinivasan

Personal details
- Born: 14 January 1951 (age 75) Periyakulam, Madras State (present-day Tamil Nadu), India
- Party: Dravida Munnetra Kazhagam
- Other political affiliations: AIADMK (1973–2022)
- Spouse: P. Vijayalakshmi (died 2021)
- Children: 3 (including P. Ravindhranath)
- Parents: M. Ottakkara Thevar (father); Palaniammal Nachiar (mother)
- Education: B.A.
- Alma mater: Hajee Karutha Rowther Howdia College
- Occupation: Politician
- Awards: International Rising Star of the Year-Asia (2019)

Ottakarathevar Panneerselvam (born 14 January 1951), popularly known as O. Panneerselvam or OPS, is an Indian politician who was the former 6th Chief Minister of Tamil Nadu in December 2016 and previously from 2001 to 2002 and from 2014 to 2015. He also served as the deputy chief minister from 2017 to 2021 in the Edappadi K. Palaniswami-led government. As a finance minister, he has presented the state budget of Tamil Nadu 11 times.

Paneerselvam joined the All India Anna Dravida Munnetra Kazhagam (AIADMK) in 1973. He was a loyalist of former chief minister and AIADMK general secretary J. Jayalalithaa. His first two terms as the chief minister came when he replaced Jayalalithaa in the role, after she was forced to resign by the Indian courts. His third term began in the aftermath of Jayalalithaa's death and ended two months later when Palaniswami was selected as the chief minister by the party. On 4 January 2018, he was elected as leader of the house in the Tamil Nadu Legislative Assembly, and served till 2021. He also served as the joint coordinator of AIADMK from August 2017 to June 2022. On 27 February 2026, he resigned as a member of the legislative assembly, and joined the Dravida Munnetra Kazhagam (DMK).

== Early and personal life ==
Panneerselvam was born on 14 January 1951 in Periyakulam, Theni district, Tamil Nadu to Ottakara Thevar and Palaniammal. He obtained Bachelor of Arts from Haji Karutha Rowther Howdia College in Uthamapalayam. He owns agricultural land, and ran a tea shop earlier. He was married to Vijayalakshmi and the couple have three children including P. Ravindhranath. His wife died on 1 September 2021 due to a cardiac arrest and his mother died at the age of 96 on 24 February 2023.

== Political career ==
=== Early political career ===
Panneerselvam started his political career in Periyakulam as a worker of the AIADMK in 1973 after M. G. Ramachandran split from the DMK. He was Chairman of Periyakulam Municipality from 1996 to 2001.

=== First term as Chief Minister, 2001–2002 ===
He was sworn in as the 6th Chief Minister of Tamil Nadu in September 2001 when the Chief Minister Jayalalithaa was barred from holding office by the Supreme Court of India. During his stint as Chief Minister, he was widely criticised for allegedly heading a puppet government managed by Jayalalithaa. His tenure lasted for six months, from 21 September 2001 to 1 March 2002. In March 2002, he resigned as Chief Minister and Jayalalithaa was sworn in again after the Madras high Court overturned her conviction and she won a by-election from Andipatti assembly constituency. From 2 March 2002 to 13 December 2003, he was the Minister for Public Works, Prohibition and Excise. Subsequently, he was also entrusted with the Revenue department's charge from 13 December 2003 to 15 May 2006.

=== Leader of the Opposition, 2006 ===
After the party lost the assembly elections in May 2006, Panneerselvam was the leader of the AIADMK legislative party and the Leader of the Opposition in the Tamil Nadu Legislative Assembly for about nine days. In that election, he was elected to be the member of Tamil Nadu legislative assembly from Periyakulam.

=== Second term as Chief Minister, 2014–2015 ===
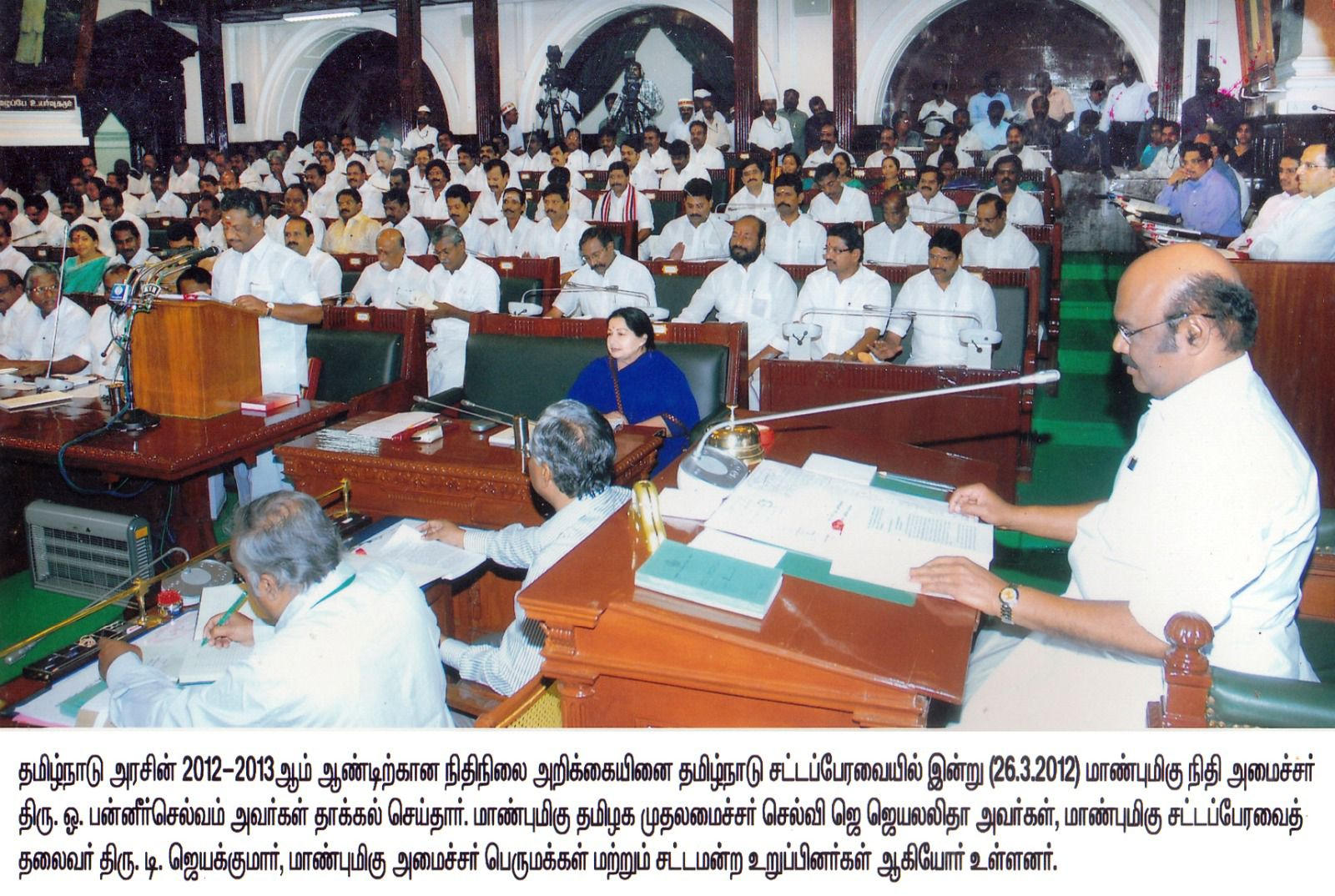
Panneerselvam presents the Tamil Nadu Budget in the State Assembly in March 2012

In 2011, he contested as an AIADMK candidate from the Bodinayakkanur and won. Again, he became the Minister of Finance in Jayalalithaa's government and held the office from 16 May 2011 to 27 September 2014. He was again entrusted with the responsibility of being Chief Minister of Tamil Nadu on 29 September 2014 when Jayalalitha was convicted in the disproportionate assets case. On 22 May 2015, he resigned as Chief Minister and Jayalalithaa was sworn in again after the Karnataka High Court acquitted her in the disproportionate assets case on 11 May 2015.

A day after his resignation, on 23 May 2015, he was sworn in as Minister for Finance and Public Works Department in Jayalalithaa's government.

=== Third term as Chief Minister, 2016 ===
During hospitalization of Jayalalithaa, he was given her portfolios from 13 October 2016, thus making him as caretaker chief minister. On 6 December 2016, Panneerselvam was elected as the Chief Minister of Tamil Nadu following the death of incumbent Chief Minister Jayalalithaa. On 11 December, he held his first cabinet meeting as a full-term Chief Minister.

=== Political crisis in AIADMK, 2016 - 2017 ===
On 29 December 2016, V. K. Sasikala was unanimously elected as the General Secretary of the AIADMK by its general council. On 5 February 2017, the party legislature elected her as its leader and Chief Ministerial candidate. The resignation of Panneerselvam from the post of Chief Minister was accepted by the Tamil Nadu Governor on 6 February 2017.

On 7 February 2017, after meditating at the memorial of Jayalalithaa, Panneerselvam publicly stated that he had been compelled by Sasikala to resign and announced his decision to challenge her leadership. On the same day, he was removed from the post of party treasurer. At the time, he was reported to have the support of 10MLAs and 12MPs, while the majority of party members expressed support for Sasikala.

After his exit from AIADMK, Panneerselvam and his supporters appealed to the election commission to take action against the party General Secretary V. K. Sasikala and chief minister Edappadi K. Palaniswami. He also made a point to them that he needs the two leaf party symbol to contest in RK Nagar by-election. Also, Edappadi K. Palaniswami and supporters appealed against him, but the election commission rejected both the appeals and allotted two different symbols to each party.

=== Deputy Chief Minister ===
In August 2017, the Edappadi K. Palaniswami and O. Panneerselvam factions merged. He was made Deputy Chief Minister and was also given the finance portfolio.

=== Tussle in AIADMK over Chief Ministerial candidate, 2020 ===
The Tussle started in October 2020 when Minister for Milk and Dairy development K. T. Rajenthra Bhalaji tweeted that the party should go for elections, with Edappadi K. Palaniswami as the Chiefminister candidate. A day before Balaji’s tweet, Cooperative Minister Sellur K. Raju said, “MLAs will elect the chief minister” when AIADMK wins the 2021 elections. Finally, the then Deputy Chief Minister Panneerselvam made the announcement that Palaniswami would be the chief ministerial candidate of the AIADMK on 20 October 2020 morning at a much awaited meeting at the AIADMK office in Chennai.

=== Tussle for LoP post, 2021 ===
On 10 May 2021, the newly elected AIADMK MLAs convened to choose the new Leader of the Opposition, an important post equivalent to a cabinet minister. The meeting was inconclusive, with both Panneerselvam and Palaniswami staking claims to the post, while their supporters hurled charges against each other. This included a prolonged quarrel between the two sections of the party outside the party's head office, causing unrest. Supporters of Palaniswami believed that he should be the Leader of the Opposition due to the party's good performance in the election in western Tamil Nadu, the region he hails from; whereas, Panneerselvam's supporters felt that the party fared poorly in other regions of the state due to Palaniswami's wrong policies during his Chief Ministerial tenure. Eventually, Palaniswami was elected as the Leader of the Opposition.

=== Second Term as Deputy Leader of Opposition, 2021–2022 ===
After the party lost the assembly elections in May 2021, Panneerselvam won the Bodinayakkanur constituency and was elected as the Deputy Leader of the Opposition in Tamil Nadu Legislative Assembly On 14 June 2021. On 17 July 2022, R. B. Udhaya Kumar was elected as the Deputy Leader of the Opposition in Tamil Nadu Legislative Assembly replacing Panneerselvam at the AIADMK Legislative Party Meeting. It was formally declared On 19 July 2022.

=== Leadership Tussle with Edappadi Palaniswami, 2022 ===
On 14 June 2022, citing the party's troubles in the polls, AIADMK district secretaries and other senior party members spoke out to shun the "dual leadership" system and came out publicly in favor of strong unitary leader to strengthen the organisation.

Palaniswami supporters pushed for the change in the party's leadership structure by staging a political coup against AIADMK Coordinator Panneerselvam, who had become weak within the party. According to many sources, of the AIADMK's 75 district secretaries, hardly 10 supported him. Of the party's 66 MLAs, only five MLAs were reportedly on Panneerselvam side and less than 20 percent of the party's general council members behind him ahead of crucial general council meeting on 23 June 2022, which was expected to elect the single leadership to the party.

On 30 June 2022, Palaniswami wrote a letter to Panneerselvam asserting the latter ceased to be the party coordinator as the amendments made to the party's bylaw in the 2021 December executive committee meeting were not recognised in the general council meeting held on 23 June.

On 11 July 2022, the Party General Council abolished the dual leadership model and empowered Palaniswami to be the Party Supremo.

=== Expulsion from AIADMK ===
On 11 July 2022, Panneerselvam was expelled as Party Treasurer and primary member of the party for "anti-party" activities by the AIADMK general council. Dindigul Sreenivasan was made Party Treasurer succeeding him. On 17 August, Justice G. Jayachandran of the Madras High Court ruled the expulsion of Panneerselvam and the decisions of the AIADMK General Council as invalid. On 2 September 2022, a division bench of the High Court upheld the decisions of the AIADMK general council meeting held on 11 July 2022 and set aside the previous court order of the single judge in the appeal case of Palaniswami, thus effectively restoring unitary leadership. On 12 September 2022, the Supreme Court dismissed the plea of Panneerselvam challenging the order of Madras High Court to handover the keys to Palaniswami. On 23 February 2023, the Supreme Court of India upheld the decisions of the AIADMK general council meeting held on 11 July 2022, and dismissed the petition of O. Panneerselvam challenging the previous order of the division bench, thus affirming unitary leadership under Edappadi K Palaniswami. On 28 March 2023, The Madras High Court ruled in favor of Edappadi K. Palaniswami and dismissed the petitions of O. Panneerselvam challenging the resolutions passed at the general council meeting held on 11 July 2022. On the same day, AIADMK announced that Edappadi K. Palaniswami was elected as the general secretary through party's general secretary election. On 20 April 2023, The Election Commission of India recognized Edappadi K Palaniswami as the AIADMK party general secretary, acknowledging the amendments to the party constitution and changes to list of office-bearers. On 19 January 2024, the Supreme Court of India refused to stay the August 2023 order of the division bench of Madras High Court which dismissed the petitions of O. Panneerselvam challenging the 11 July general council resolutions that led to the expulsion of O. Panneerselvam and his supporters from the party, saying the interference at this stage will "lead to huge chaos".

=== DMK (2026–present) ===
On 27 February 2026, Panneerselvam resigned as a member of the legislative assembly, and later joined the Dravida Munnetra Kazhagam in the presence of party president M. K. Stalin.

== Controversy ==
A report in The Week in December 2017, alleged that Panneerselvam was on the sand mining baron Sekhar Reddy's payroll. Reddy was arrested by the Income Tax Department in March 2017 on money laundering charges. Five pages of the Reddy's Diary suggest alleged payments made to several AIADMK ministers, MLAs, and many others, amounting to more than ₹48 crore. At least five payments in which the word OPS or the name of his secretary Ramesh was written are shown in the contents of the diary.

== Elections contested and positions held ==
=== Lok Sabha elections ===
Elections	Lok Sabha	Constituency	Political party	Result	Vote percentage	Opposition		
Elections	Lok Sabha	Constituency	Political party	Result	Vote percentage	Candidate	Political party	Vote percentage
2024	18th	Ramanathapuram	IND	Lost	30.86%	K. Navaskani	IUML	45.86%

=== Tamil Nadu Legislative Assembly elections ===
Elections	Assembly	Constituency	Political party	Result	Vote percentage	Opposition		
Elections	Assembly	Constituency	Political party	Result	Vote percentage	Candidate	Political party	Vote percentage
2001	12th	Periyakulam	AIADMK	Won	54.28%	M. Abuthahir	DMK	38.62%
2006	13th	Periyakulam	AIADMK	Won	49.78%	L. Mookaiah	DMK	38.98%
2011	14th	Bodinayakanur	AIADMK	Won	56.69%	S. Lakshmanan	DMK	38.89%
2016	15th	Bodinayakanur	AIADMK	Won	49.38%	S. Lakshmanan	DMK	41.63%
2021	16th	Bodinayakanur	AIADMK	Won	46.58%	Thanga Tamilselvan	DMK	41.45%
2026	17th	Bodinayakanur	DMK	Won	38.62%	S. Prakash	TVK	35.54%

=== Positions in Tamil Nadu Legislative Assembly ===
Elections	Position	Elected constituency	Term in office		
Elections	Position	Elected constituency	Assumed office	Left office	Time in office
2001	Minister for Revenue	Periyakulam	14 May 2001	20 September 2001	129 days
2001	Chief Minister	Periyakulam	21 September 2001	2 March 2002	162 days
2001	Minister for Public Works, Prohibition and Excise	Periyakulam	2 March 2002	12 December 2002	285 days
2001	Minister for Public Works, Prohibition, Excise and Revenue	Periyakulam	13 December 2002	12 May 2006	3 years, 150 days
2006	Leader of the Opposition	Periyakulam	19 May 2006	28 May 2006	9 days
2006	Deputy Leader of the Opposition	Periyakulam	29 May 2006	14 May 2011	4 years, 350 days
2011	Minister for Finance	Bodinayakanur	16 May 2011	10 November 2013	2 years, 178 days
2011	Minister for Finance and Public Works	Bodinayakanur	11 November 2013	27 September 2014	320 days
2011	Chief Minister	Bodinayakanur	28 September 2014	23 May 2015	237 days
2011	Minister for Finance and Public Works	Bodinayakanur	23 May 2015	22 May 2016	365 days
2016	Minister for Finance	Bodinayakanur	23 May 2016	5 December 2016	196 days
2016	Chief Minister	Bodinayakanur	6 December 2016	15 February 2017	72 days
2016	Member of the Legislative Assembly	Bodinayakanur	16 February 2017	20 August 2017	185 days
2016	Deputy Chief Minister	Bodinayakanur	21 August 2017	6 May 2021	3 years, 258 days
2021	Deputy Leader of the Opposition	Bodinayakanur	14 June 2021	10 July 2022	2 years, 245 days
2021	Member of the Legislative Assembly	Bodinayakanur	11 July 2022	27 February 2026	3 years, 231 days
2026	Member of the Legislative Assembly	Bodinayakanur	11 May 2026	Incumbent	167 days

Political offices
Preceded by J. Jayalalithaa	Chief Minister of Tamil Nadu; First tenure 2001–2002	Succeeded by J. Jayalalithaa
Preceded by J. Jayalalithaa	Chief Minister of Tamil Nadu; Second tenure 2014–2015	Succeeded by J. Jayalalithaa
Preceded by J. Jayalalithaa	Chief Minister of Tamil Nadu; Third tenure 6–17 December 2016	Succeeded by Edappadi K. Palaniswami
