= 12th Tamil Nadu Assembly =

2001–2006 Tamil Nadu Assembly term

←	11th	13th	→

Overview
- Legislative body: Tamil Nadu Legislative Assembly
- Meeting place: Fort St. George, Chennai
- Term: 14 May 2001 – 12 May 2006
- Election: 2001 Tamil Nadu Legislative Assembly election
- Government: Second Jayalalithaa ministry (2001); First Panneerselvam ministry (2001-2002); Third Jayalalithaa ministry (2002-2006)
- Opposition: Dravida Munnetra Kazhagam
- Members: 235
- Speaker: K. Kalimuthu
- Deputy Speaker: A. Arunachalam
- Chief Minister: J. Jayalalithaa
- Leader of the Opposition: K. Anbazhagan
- Party control: All India Anna Dravida Munnetra Kazhagam

The 12th Assembly of Tamil Nadu was instituted after the victory of AIADMK and allies in the 2001 state assembly election. O. Panneerselvam and J. Jayalalithaa subsequently became the 13th and 14th Chief Minister of Tamil Nadu respectively. Even though Jayalalithaa was the Chief Minister between 14 May and 21 September 2001, the Supreme Court of India, declared that she did not legally hold the post, due to corruption charges from her previous Chief ministership.

== Overview ==
Department	Minister
Speaker	K. Kalimuthu
Deputy Speaker	A. Arunachalam
Leader of the House	C. Ponnaiyan
Leader of Opposition	K. Anbazhagan

== Chief Ministers ==
Chief Minister	Took office	Left office	Term
J. Jayalalithaa	14 May 2001	21 September 2001	130 days
O. Panneerselvam	21 September 2001	2 March 2002	162 days
J. Jayalalithaa	2 March 2002	12 May 2006	1,532 days

== Council of Ministers ==
Department	Minister
Chief Minister	O. Panneerselvam (21 September 2001 – 2 March 2002); J. Jayalalithaa (14 May 2001 – 21 September 2001) (2 March 2002 – 12 May 2006)
Deputy Chief Minister	None
Finance and Law	C. Ponnaiyan
Public Accounts	S. R. Balasubramoniyan
Public Undertakings	R. Jeevanantham; M. C. Sampath

== See also ==
- Government of Tamil Nadu
- Legislature of Tamil Nadu
