= S. Damodaran =

S. Damodaran may refer to:

- S. Damodaran (politician) (born 1952), Indian politician from Tamil Nadu, affiliated to All India Anna Dravida Munnetra Kazhagam
- S Damodaran (social worker) (born 1962), Indian social worker from Tamil Nadu, the founder of the NGO Gramalaya
- S Damodaran (Kerala politician), Indian politician, represented the Mararikulam Assembly Constituency in the Kerala Legislative Assembly 1967–1977

== See also ==
- S. Dhamodharan, Indian politician from Tamil Nadu, affiliated to Tamil Maanila Congress (Moopanar)
