= 2nd Madras State Assembly =

1957–1962 Indian state legislative assembly

The Second legislative assembly of Madras state (1 April 1957 – 18 March 1962) was constituted in April 1957 after the assembly election which held in March 1957.

== Overview ==
The general election were held in 1957 for 167 territorial constituencies, of which 129 were single-member constituencies and 38 were double-member constituencies. Thirty-seven seats were reserved for the Scheduled Caste and one seat was reserved for the Scheduled Tribes. After the election the assembly was constituted which consisted of 205 elected Members. In that election, Congress under the leadership of K. Kamaraj won with a majority.

In 1960, as a result of the Andhra Pradesh and Madras (Alteration of Boundaries) Act, 1959, one member from the Andhra Pradesh Legislative Assembly(member of Tiruttani Constituency) was allotted to Madras Legislative Assembly and consequently the strength of the Madras Assembly increased to 206, exclusive of the nominated Anglo-Indian Member. By the Two Member Constituencies (Abolition) Act, 1961, the 38 double-member constituencies have been abolished and an equal number of single-member constituencies have been reserved for Scheduled Castes and Scheduled Tribes as before. Hence the number of territorial constituencies has increased to 206.

| Position | Leader |
|---|---|
| Governor | A.J. John; P. V. Rajamannar; Bishuram Medhi |
| Chief Minister | K. Kamaraj |
| Speaker | U.Krishna Rau |
| Deputy Speaker | B. Bhaktavatsalu Naidu |
| Leader of the House | C. Subramaniam |
| Leader of Opposition | V.K.Ramasamy Mudaliar (INDC) |

== Council of Ministers ==
The Council of Ministers during Second legislative assembly.

| Minister | Portfolios |
|---|---|
| K. Kamaraj | Chief Minister, Public, Planning and Development (including Local development Works, Women's Welfare, Community Projects and Rural Welfare), National Extension Scheme |
| M. Bhaktavatsalam | Home |
| C. Subramaniam | Finance |
| R. Venkataraman | Industries |
| M. A. Manickavelu Naicker | Revenue |
| P. Kakkan | Works |
| V. Ramaiah | Electricity |
| Lourdhammal Simon | Local Administration |

== See also ==
- 1957 Madras State legislative assembly election
