= 1st Madras State Assembly =

1952–57 Indian state legislative assembly

The first Legislative Assembly of Madras state was constituted in May 1952. This was following the first election held in Madras state after the Indian Independence.

== Overview ==
Under the New Constitution of India, The Legislature consists of the Governor and two Houses known as the Legislative Council and the Legislative Assembly. The Madras Legislative Assembly consisted of 375 seats to be filled by election, distributed in 309 constituencies, 243 single-members constituencies, 62 double-member constituencies in each of which a seat had been reserved for Scheduled Castes and four two-member constituencies in each of which a seat had been reserved for Scheduled Tribes. Three seats were uncontested.

In 1953, after the formation of Andhra State which consisting of the Telugu-speaking areas and Bellary district was also merged with the Mysore State which consisting of Kannada speaking area. The Members of the Madras Legislative Assembly was reduced to 231. Consequent on the States Reorganisation Act, the number of members of the Assembly was again reduced to 190.

In the 1952 Madras State legislative assembly election, no single party obtained a simple majority to form an independent Government. C. Rajagopalachari (Rajaji) of the Indian National Congress became the Chief Minister after a series of re-alignments among various political parties and Independents. Rajaji was resigned in 1954 after the heavy opposition to his Hereditary education policy. In the ensuing leadership struggle, Kamaraj defeated Rajaji's chosen successor C. Subramaniam and became the Chief Minister on 31 March 1954.

Position	Leader
Governor	Sri Prakasa; A.J. John
Chief Minister	C. Rajagopalachari; K. Kamaraj
Speaker	J. Sivashanmugam Pillai; N. Gopala Menon
Deputy Speaker	B. Bhaktavatsalu Naidu
Leader of the House	C. Subramaniam
Leader of Opposition	Nagi Reddi; P. Ramamurthi

== Cabinet ==
=== Rajagopalachari's Cabinet ===
The Cabinet under Rajagopalachari was sworn in on 10 April 1952.

Minister	Portfolio
C. Rajagopalachari	Chief Minister, Public and Police
A. B. Shetty	Health
C. Subramaniam	Finance, Food and Elections
K. Venkataswamy Naidu	Religious Endowments and Registration
N. Ranga Reddi	Public Works
M. V. Krishna Rao	Education, Harijan Uplift and Information
V. C. Palanisami Gounder	Prohibition
U. Krishna Rao	Industries, Labour, Motor Transport, Railways, Posts, Telegraphs and Civil Aviation
R. Nagana Gowda	Agriculture, Forests, veterinary, Animal Husbandry, Fisheries and Cinchona
N. Sankara Reddi	Local Administration
M. A. Manickavelu Naicker	Land Revenue
K. P. Kuttikrishnan Nair	Courts, Prisons and Legal Department
Raja Sri Shanmuga Rajeswara Sethupathi	House Rent Control
S. B. B. Pattabirama Rao	Rural Welfare, Commercial Taxes and Scheduled areas
D. Sanjeevayya	Cooperation and Housing

Changes

- Ministers belonging to Bellary and Andhra constituencies (Naganna Gowda, Sankara Reddi, Pattabirama Rao, Sanjeevayya and Ranga Reddi) stepped down on 30 September 1953, a day before Andhra State split to form a separate state. The portfolios of Agriculture, Forests, Fisheries, Cinchona, Rural Welfare, Community Projects and National Extension Schemes were handed over to M. Bhaktavatsalam on 9 October 1953. Jothi Venkatachalam was made minister for Prohibition and Women's Welfare. K. Rajaram Naidu became the Minister for Local Administration. C. Subramaniam was given the additional portfolios of education, information and publicity. V. C. Palaniswamy Gounder was put in charge of Veterinary, Animal Husbandry and Harijan welfare.

=== Kamaraj's Cabinet ===
Members of cabinet who served between 13 April 1954 - 13 April 1957 under the Chief Ministership of Kamraj are:

Minister	Portfolio
K. Kamaraj	Chief Minister; Minister of Public and Police in the Home Department
A. B. Shetty	Minister in charge of medical and public health, cooperation, housing and ex-servicemen
M. Bhaktavatsalam	Minister in charge of Agriculture, Forests, Fisheries, Cinchona, Rural Welfare, Community Projects, National Extension Scheme, Women's Welfare, Industries and Labour and Animal Husbandry and Veterinary
C. Subramaniam	Minister in charge of Finance, Food, Education, Elections and Information and Publicity and Law (Courts and Prisons)
M. A. Manickavelu Naicker	Minister in charge of Land Revenue and Commercial Taxes and Rural Development.
S. S. Ramasami Padayachi	Minister of Local Administration
Raja Sri Shanmuga Rajeswara Sethupathi	Minister in charge of Public Works, Accommodation Control, Engineering Colleges, Stationery and Printing including Establishment questions of the Stationery Department and the Government Press
B. Parameswaran	Minister in charge of Transport, Harijan Uplift, Hindu Religious Endowments, Registration and Prohibition

Changes

- Following the States Reorganisation Act of 1956, A. B. Shetty quit the Ministry on 1 March 1956 and his portfolio was shared between other ministers in the cabinet.

== See also ==
- 1951 Madras Legislative Assembly election
- Tamil Nadu Legislative Assembly
