= 3rd Madras State Assembly =

1962–67 Indian state legislative assembly

The third legislative assembly of Madras state (3 March 1962 – 28 February 1967) was constituted in March 1962 after the assembly election which was held in February 1962.

== Overview ==
The general elections were held in 1962 for 206 constituencies. In the election, Congress under the leadership of Kamaraj won with a majority, and subsequently formed the government. Kamaraj proposed the Kamaraj Plan and on 2 October 1963 he resigned from the Chief Minister post. After the resignation, M. Bakthavatsalam became the chief minister of Tamil Nadu. In 1965, the strength of the assembly was increased to 234 by the Delimitation of Parliamentary and Assembly Constituencies Order, 1965.

| Position | Leader |
|---|---|
| Governor | Bhishnuram Medhi; Jayachamaraja Wodeyar Bahadur, P. Chandra Reddy; Sardar Ujjal Singh |
| Chief Minister | K. Kamaraj; M. Bakthavatsalam |
| Speaker | S. Chellapandian |
| Deputy Speaker | K. Parthasarathi |
| Leader of the House | M. Bhaktavatsalam |
| Leader of Opposition | V. R. Nedunchezhiyan |

== Kamaraj's cabinet ==
The council of ministers in the Kamaraj cabinet:

| Minister | Portfolios |
|---|---|
| K. Kamaraj | Chief Minister, Public, Planning and Development (including Local development Works, Women's Welfare, Community Projects and Rural Welfare), National Extension Scheme |
| M. Bhaktavatsalam | Finance and Education |
| Jothi Venkatachalam | Public Health, Women & Children's Welfare |
| R. Venkataraman | Revenue |
| S. M. Abdul Majeed | Local Administration |
| P. Kakkan | Agriculture |
| V. Ramaiah | Public Works and Revenue |
| N. Nallasenapathi Sarkarai Mandradiar | Cooperation and Forests |
| G. Bhuvaraghan | Publicity and Information |

== Bhaktavatsalam's cabinet ==
The council of ministers in the Bhaktavatsalam cabinet:

| Minister | Portfolios |
|---|---|
| M. Bhaktavatsalam | Chief Minister |
| Jothi Venkatachalam | Health |
| R. Venkataraman | Industries |
| S. M. Abdul Majeed | Local Administration |
| P. Kakkan | Home |
| V. Ramaiah | Food |
| Nalla Senapathi Sarkari Manradiar | Co-operation |
| G. Bhuvaraghan | Publicity and Information |

== See also ==
- 1962 Madras State legislative assembly election
- Tamil Nadu Legislative Assembly
