= Chidambaram Subramaniam =

Indian politician

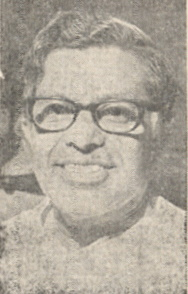
- Lok Sabha portrait

Governor of Maharashtra
- In office 15 February 1990 – 9 January 1993
- Appointed by: Ramaswamy Venkataraman
- Prime Minister: V. P. Singh; Chandra Shekhar; P. V. Narasimha Rao
- Chief Ministers: Sharad Pawar; Sudhakarrao Naik
- Preceded by: Chittatosh Mookerjee (acting)
- Succeeded by: P. C. Alexander

Union Minister of Defence
- In office 28 July 1979 – 14 January 1980
- Prime Minister: Charan Singh
- Preceded by: Jagjivan Ram
- Succeeded by: Indira Gandhi

Union Minister of Finance
- In office 10 October 1974 – 24 March 1977
- Prime Minister: Indira Gandhi
- Preceded by: Yashwantrao Chavan
- Succeeded by: Haribhai M. Patel

Union Minister of Agriculture
- In office 3 July 1974 – 10 October 1974
- Prime Minister: Indira Gandhi
- Preceded by: Fakhruddin Ali Ahmed
- Succeeded by: Jagjivan Ram
- In office 9 June 1964 – 13 March 1967
- Prime Minister: Lal Bahadur Shastri; Gulzarilal Nanda; Indira Gandhi
- Preceded by: Swaran Singh
- Succeeded by: Jagjivan Ram
Other positions
Deputy Chairman of the Planning Commission
In office 2 May 1971 – 22 July 1972
Prime Minister	Indira Gandhi
Preceded by	Dhananjay Ramchandra Gadgil
Succeeded by	Durga Prasad Dhar
Union Minister of Industrial Development
In office 22 July 1972 – 10 October 1974
Prime Minister	Indira Gandhi
Preceded by	Moinul Hoque Choudhury
Succeeded by	T. A. Pai
Union Minister of Planning
In office 24 April 1971 – 22 July 1972
Prime Minister	Indira Gandhi
Preceded by	Indira Gandhi
Succeeded by	Durga Prasad Dhar
Union Minister of Steel, Mines and Heavy Industries
In office 10 April 1962 – 9 June 1964; Union Minister of Steel and Heavy Industries until 21 November 1963
Prime Minister	Jawaharlal Nehru; Gulzarilal Nanda (Interim)
Preceded by	Swaran Singh
Succeeded by	Neelam Sanjiva Reddy

Personal details
- Born: 30 January 1910
- Died: 7 November 2000 (aged 90)
- Party: Indian National Congress; Indian National Congress (Urs)
- Education: University of Madras
- Awards: Bharat Ratna (1998)

Chidambaram Subramaniam (commonly known as CS) (30 January 1910 – 7 November 2000) was an Indian politician and independence activist. He served as Minister of Finance and Minister of Defence in the union cabinet. He later served as the Governor of Maharashtra. As the Minister for Food and Agriculture, he ushered the Indian Green Revolution, an era of self-sufficiency in food production along with M. S. Swaminathan, B. Sivaraman and Norman E. Borlaug. He was awarded Bharat Ratna, Indian's highest civilian award, in 1998, for his role in ushering Green Revolution.

== Early life and education ==
Subramaniam was born in Senguttaipalayam a village near Pollachi in Coimbatore district, Presidency of Fort St. George (now the Tamil Nadu state). Subramaniam completed his early education in Pollachi before moving to Chennai where he did his B.Sc in Physics at the Presidency College, Chennai (affiliated to the University of Madras). Later he graduated with degree in law from Madras Law college, Chennai (then affiliated to the same university). During his college days, he started Vanamalar Sangam and published a magazine called Pithan from Gobichettipalayam along with Periyasaamy Thooran, K. M. Ramasami Gounder, O. V. Alagesan and Justice Palanisami. His inspiration was his uncle Swami Chidbhavananda.

== Political career ==
=== Early years ===
Subramaniam was an active member of the Civil disobedience movement against the British during his college days. He was imprisoned during the Quit India Movement in 1942. He was later elected to the Constituent Assembly and had a hand in the framing of the Constitution of India. He was a minister of Education, Law and Finance for Madras State from 1952 to 1962 under chief ministers Rajaji and K. Kamaraj. He was the First Leader of the House in the Madras Legislative Assembly for the entire duration. He was elected to the Lok Sabha in 1962 and was the Minister for Steel and Mines. Subsequently, he served as the Minister for Food and Agriculture. He also worked as the Deputy Chairman of the Planning Commission from 2 May 1971 to 22 July 1972.

=== Green Revolution ===
Along with M. S. Swaminathan and B. Sivaraman, Subramaniam was the architect of India's modern agricultural development policy, after the success of his programme which led to a record production of wheat in 1972 termed as the Indian Green Revolution. As Minister for Food and Agriculture, he introduced high-yielding varieties of seeds and more intensive application of fertilizers which paved the way for increased output of cereals and attainment of self-sufficiency in food-grains in the country. About his contribution, Dr. Norman E. Borlaug, writes:

The vision and influence of Mr. Subramaniam in bringing about agricultural change and in the very necessary political decisions needed to make the new approach effective, should never be under-emphasized. The groundwork for this advance (in the production of wheat) was solidly laid during that period (1964–67) when Mr. Subramaniam was the guiding political force instituting change.

He appointed M. S. Swaminathan, who played a major role in green revolution and Verghese Kurien as the chairman of National Dairy Development Board when he ushered the Indian White Revolution. Kurien says, that the key role played by Subramaniam in the whole thing (Operation Flood) is hardly mentioned. He founded the National Agro Foundation, Chennai and Bharathidasan Institute of Management, Tiruchirappalli.

=== Finance ministry and emergency ===
When the Indian National Congress split in 1969, he became the interim president of the Congress (R) faction led by Indira Gandhi. Later, he was appointed Minister of Finance in the union cabinet by Indira Gandhi. He advised her to devalue Indian rupee and was the finance minister during the Emergency in 1976. After the Emergency, he parted ways with Indira and joined the breakaway Congress faction led by D. Devaraj Urs and Kasu Brahmananda Reddy.

=== Later years ===
He was appointed the union Minister of Defence by Charan Singh in 1979. He became the Governor of Maharashtra in 1990. He resigned after his criticism of the style of functioning of the then Indian Prime Minister P. V. Narasimha Rao.

Subramaniam died on 7 November 2000 at the age of 90 in Chennai. At his death, he was the last surviving cabinet minister who had served under Jawaharlal Nehru, as well as the last surviving cabinet minister from the Shastri and Nanda cabinets.

== Awards ==
- Bharat Ratna, India's highest civilian honor, 1998
- Y. B. Chavan National Integration Award
- U Thant peace award, 1996
- Norman Borlaug award, 1996
- Anuvrat award, 1988

== Publications ==
- The New Strategy in Indian Agriculture
- Some Countries which I visited Round The World
- The India of My Dreams

== Legacy ==
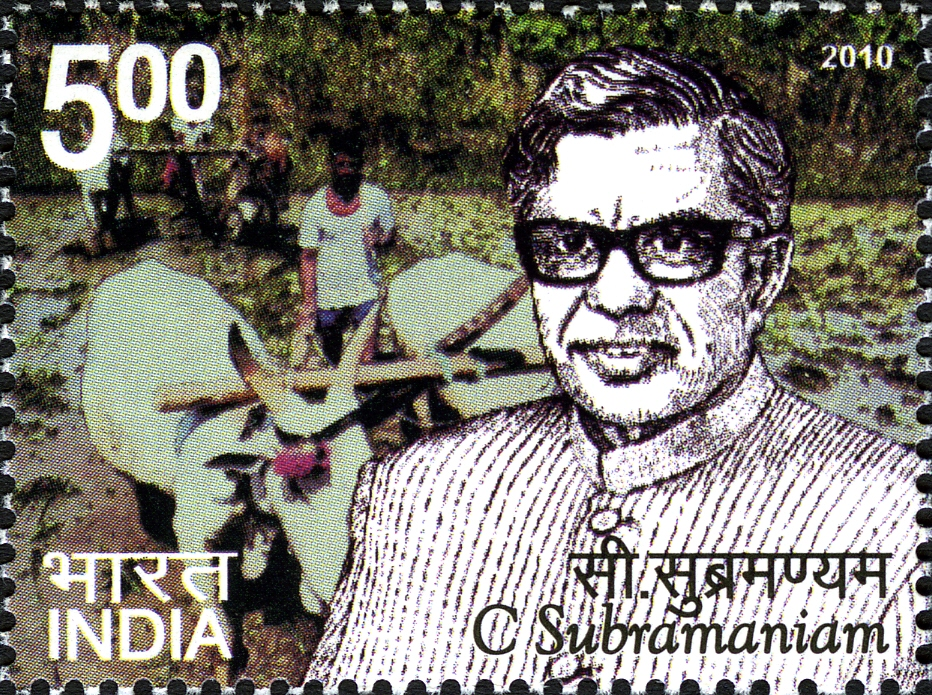
Subramaniam on a 2010 stamp of India

A commemorative coin in his honour, was released by the Government of India in August 2010. A commemorative postage stamp was also released in his honour in 2010.

Shri Chidambaram Subramaniam Award - For Excellence in Character has been instituted by Bharatiya Vidya Bhavans which is awarded to its students annually.

Political offices
Preceded by Swaran Singh	Minister of Agriculture; 1964–1966	Succeeded by Jagjivan Ram
Preceded by D. R. Gadgil	Deputy Chairman of the Planning Commission; 1971–1972	Succeeded by Durga Prasad Dhar
Preceded by Yashwantrao Chavan	Finance Minister of India; 1975–1977	Succeeded by H. M. Patel
Preceded by Jagjivan Ram	Defence Minister of India; 1979–1980	Succeeded by Indira Gandhi
Preceded by Kasu Brahmananda Reddy	Governor of Maharashtra; 1990–1993	Succeeded by P. C. Alexander
