= 13th Tamil Nadu Assembly =

2006–2011 Tamil Nadu Assembly term

←	12th	14th	→

Overview
- Legislative body: Tamil Nadu Legislative Assembly
- Meeting place: Fort St. George, Chennai
- Term: 13 May 2006 – 15 May 2011
- Election: 2006 Tamil Nadu Legislative Assembly election
- Government: Fifth Karunanidhi ministry
- Opposition: All India Anna Dravida Munnetra Kazhagam
- Website: Official website
- Members: 235
- Speaker: R. Avudaiyappan
- Deputy Speaker: V. P. Duraisamy
- Chief Minister: M. Karunanidhi
- Deputy Chief Minister: M.K. Stalin (2009 -2011)
- Leader of the Opposition: J. Jayalalithaa
- Party control: Dravida Munnetra Kazhagam

The 13th Assembly of Tamil Nadu was instituted after the victory of DMK and allies, in the 2006 state assembly election. M. Karunanidhi became the 14th Chief Minister of Tamil Nadu due to the election.

== Overview ==
Source: Tamil Nadu Legislative Assembly website

Department	Minister
Speaker	R. Avudaiappan
Deputy Speaker	V. P. Duraisamy
Leader of the House	K. Anbazhagan
Leader of Opposition	J.Jayalalithaa

== Chief Minister ==
Chief Minister	Took office	Left office	Term
M. Karunanidhi	13 May 2006	15 May 2011	1,828 days

== Council of Ministers ==
Source: Tamil Nadu Legislative Assembly website

Department	Minister
Chief Minister	M. Karunanidhi
Deputy Chief Minister	M. K. Stalin
Finance	K. Anbazhagan
Electricity	Arcot N. Veeraswami
Cooperation, Statistics and Ex-Servicemen	Ko. Si. Mani
Agriculture	Veerapandi S. Arumugam
Public works and Law	Durai Murugan
Higher Education	K. Ponmudy
Transport	K. N. Nehru
Health	M. R. K. Paneerselvam
Rural Industries and Animal Husbandry	Pongalur N. Palanisamy
Revenue and Housing	I. Periasami
Tourism and Registration	N. Suresh Rajan
Information	Parithi Ilamvazhuthi
Food	E. V. Velu
slum clearance and Accommodation	Suba Thangavelan
Backward Classes	K. K. S. S. R. Ramachandran
Labour	T. M. Anbarasan
Hindu Religious and Charitable Endowments	K. R. Periyakaruppan
School Education	Thangam Thennarasu
Commercial Taxes	S. N. M Ubayadullah
Environment	T. P. M. Mohideen Khan
Forests	N. Selvaraj
Highways	Vellakoil Saminathan
Information Technology	Poongothai Aladi Aruna
Social Welfare	Geetha Jeevan
Adi-Dravidar welfare	Tamilarasi
Fisheries	K. P. P. Samy
Dairy Development	U. Mathivanan
Khadi	K. Ramachandran

== See also ==
- Government of Tamil Nadu
- Legislature of Tamil Nadu
