= Gobichettipalayam Assembly constituency =

State Legislative Assembly Constituency in Tamil Nadu, India

Coordinates: 11°27′13″N 77°26′18″E

Gobichettipalayam
- Constituency No. 106 for the Tamil Nadu Legislative Assembly

Constituency details
- Country: India
- Region: South India
- State: Tamil Nadu
- District: Erode
- Lok Sabha constituency: Tiruppur
- Established: 1957
- Total electors: 2,39,198

Member of Legislative Assembly
- 17th Tamil Nadu Legislative Assembly
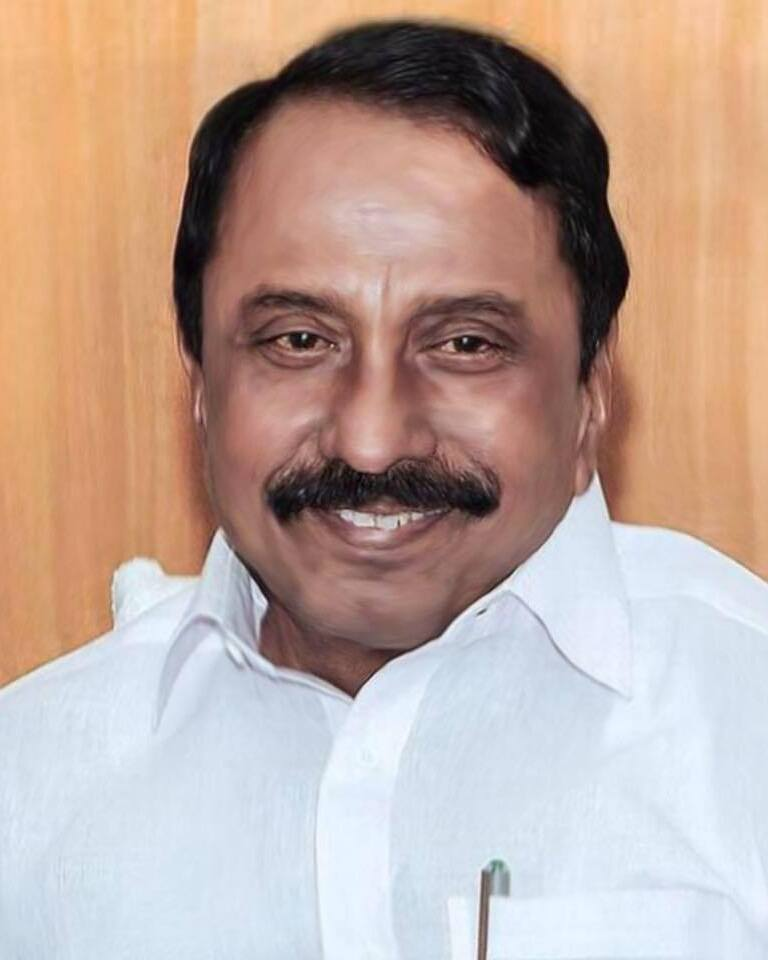
- Incumbent K. A. Sengottaiyan
- Party: TVK
- Elected year: 2026

Gobichettipalayam is a state assembly constituency in Erode district in Tamil Nadu. Its State Assembly Constituency number is 106. It comes under Tiruppur Lok Sabha constituency. Most successful party: ADMK (10 times). It is one of the 234 State Legislative Assembly Constituencies in Tamil Nadu, in India.

== Members of Legislative Assembly ==
Year	Member	Political party
Madras State
1957	P. S. Nalla Gounder	Indian National Congress
1957	P. G. Karuthiruman	Indian National Congress
1962	Muthuvelappa Gounder	Indian National Congress
1967	K. M. R. Gounder	Swatantra Party
Tamil Nadu
1971	S. M. Palaniappan	Dravida Munnetra Kazhagam
1977	N. K. K. Ramasamy	All India Anna Dravida Munnetra Kazhagam
1980	K. A. Sengottaiyan	All India Anna Dravida Munnetra Kazhagam
1984	K. A. Sengottaiyan	All India Anna Dravida Munnetra Kazhagam
1989	K. A. Sengottaiyan	All India Anna Dravida Munnetra Kazhagam
1991	K. A. Sengottaiyan	All India Anna Dravida Munnetra Kazhagam
1996	G. P. Venkidu	Dravida Munnetra Kazhagam
2001	S. S. Ramaneedharan	All India Anna Dravida Munnetra Kazhagam
2006	K. A. Sengottaiyan	All India Anna Dravida Munnetra Kazhagam
2011	K. A. Sengottaiyan	All India Anna Dravida Munnetra Kazhagam
2016	K. A. Sengottaiyan	All India Anna Dravida Munnetra Kazhagam
2021	K. A. Sengottaiyan	All India Anna Dravida Munnetra Kazhagam
2026	K. A. Sengottaiyan	Tamilaga Vettri Kazhagam

== Election results ==
Vote share of winning candidates
2026	37.60%
2021	51.00%
2016	47.00%
2011	54.47%
2006	45.41%
2001	57.05%
1996	53.86%
1991	68.18%
1989	38.14%
1984	63.08%
1980	59.38%
1977	34.99%
1971	59.45%
1967	52.61%
1962	49.14%
1957	57.91%

=== 2026 ===
2026 Tamil Nadu Legislative Assembly election: Gobichettipalayam
Party	Candidate	Votes	%	±%
TVK	K. A. Sengottaiyan	82,612	37.60	New
DMK	N. Nallasivam	65,992	30.03	▼7.55
AIADMK	V. B. Prabhu	56,232	25.59	▼25.41
NTK	M. K. Seethalakshmi	8,137	3.70	▼1.80
TVK	M. Thiruvengatesh	1,746	0.79	New
NOTA	None of the above	907	0.41	▼0.20
Margin of victory		16,620	7.57	▼5.84
Turnout		2,19,727	91.86	▲8.78
Registered electors		2,39,198		
TVK gain from AIADMK		Swing	▲37.60	

=== 2021 ===
2021 Tamil Nadu Legislative Assembly election: Gobichettipalayam
Party	Candidate	Votes	%	±%
AIADMK	K. A. Sengottaiyan	108,608	51.00	+3.99
DMK	G. V. Manimaran	80,045	37.58	
NTK	M. K. Seethalakshmi	11,719	5.50	4.68
MNM	N. K. Prakash	4,291	2.01	
AMMK	N. K. Thulasimani	2,682	1.26	
NOTA	None of the above	1,307	0.61	−0.73
Margin of victory		28,563	13.41	7.93
Turnout		212,974	83.08	−1.24
Rejected ballots		130	0.06	
Registered electors		256,363		
AIADMK hold		Swing	3.99	

=== 2016 ===
2016 Tamil Nadu Legislative Assembly election: Gobichettipalayam
Party	Candidate	Votes	%	±%
AIADMK	K. A. Sengottaiyan	96,177	47.00	−7.47
INC	S. V. Saravanan	84,954	41.52	
CPI(M)	M. Munusamy	7,531	3.68	
KMDK	N. S. Sivaraj	3,341	1.63	
BJP	K. Ganapathi	3,149	1.54	−0.42
NOTA	None Of The Above	2,751	1.34	
NTK	S. Gowreesan	1,677	0.82	
PMK	Kuppusamy	1,045	0.51	
Independent	Ravisekaran	1,004	0.49	
Independent	Lingeswaran	836	0.41	
Independent	M. Palanisamyraaj	667	0.33	
Margin of victory		11,223	5.48	−18.58
Turnout		204,628	84.32	0.98
Registered electors		242,690		
AIADMK hold		Swing	-7.47	

=== 2011 ===
2011 Tamil Nadu Legislative Assembly election: Gobichettipalayam
Party	Candidate	Votes	%	±%
AIADMK	K. A. Sengottaiyan	94,872	54.47	9.06
KNMK	N. S. Sivaraj	52,960	30.40	
Independent	C. S. Venkatachalam	10,095	5.80	
BJP	N. Sennayyan	3,408	1.96	0.81
Margin of victory		41,912	24.06	20.75
Turnout		209,023	83.33	6.15
Registered electors		174,184		
AIADMK hold		Swing	9.06	

=== 2006 ===
2006 Tamil Nadu Legislative Assembly election: Gobichettipalayam
Party	Candidate	Votes	%	±%
AIADMK	K. A. Sengottaiyan	55,181	45.41	−11.64
DMK	V. Manimaran. G. V	51,162	42.10	12.20
DMDK	G. S. Natarajan	10,875	8.95	
Independent	R. Rangasamy	1,518	1.25	
BJP	R. Velliangiri	1,399	1.15	
BSP	T. Periyasamy	903	0.74	
Independent	Miniyan	478	0.39	
Margin of victory		4,019	3.31	−23.84
Turnout		121,516	77.18	12.77
Registered electors		157,445		
AIADMK hold		Swing	-11.64	

=== 2001 ===
2001 Tamil Nadu Legislative Assembly election: Gobichettipalayam
Party	Candidate	Votes	%	±%
AIADMK	S.V.LAKSHA	60,826	57.05	16.42
DMK	V. P. Shanmugasundram	31,881	29.90	−23.95
Independent	R. Sudharson	5,859	5.49	
MDMK	G. M. Mahendran	3,380	3.17	1.03
Tamil Desiya Katchi	L. S. Harisshankar	2,237	2.10	
Independent	P. S. Pandian	1,457	1.37	
Independent	S. K. Palaniappan	496	0.47	
Independent	P. Indra	486	0.46	
Margin of victory		28,945	27.15	13.93
Turnout		106,612	64.41	−10.38
Registered electors		165,548		
AIADMK gain from DMK		Swing	3.20	

=== 1996 ===
1996 Tamil Nadu Legislative Assembly election: Gobichettipalayam
Party	Candidate	Votes	%	±%
DMK	G. P. Venkidu	59,983	53.86	25.93
AIADMK	K. A. Sengottaiyan	45,254	40.63	−27.54
Independent	S. Maruthamuthu	2,560	2.30	
MDMK	K. R. Kalathinathan	2,384	2.14	
ATMK	G. S. Annamalai	679	0.61	
Independent	K. Rangasamy	194	0.17	
Independent	K. S. Geeta	167	0.15	
Independent	K. A. Malaisamy	154	0.14	
Margin of victory		14,729	13.22	−27.02
Turnout		111,375	74.79	4.57
Registered electors		153,403		
DMK gain from AIADMK		Swing	-14.32	

=== 1991 ===
1991 Tamil Nadu Legislative Assembly election: Gobichettipalayam
Party	Candidate	Votes	%	±%
AIADMK	K. A. Sengottaiyan	66,423	68.18	30.03
DMK	V. P. Shanmoga Sundaram	27,211	27.93	
PMK	M. E. Saminathan	2,639	2.71	
Independent	M. S. Sreedharan	264	0.27	
Independent	S. Dharuman	186	0.19	
Independent	G. R. Ravisekar	155	0.16	
Independent	K. Mohideen	153	0.16	
Independent	Rangasamy	127	0.13	
Independent	G. P. R. Raja	100	0.10	
Independent	P. Arumugam	98	0.10	
Independent	K. S. Balraj	72	0.07	
Margin of victory		39,212	40.25	25.64
Turnout		97,428	70.22	−5.51
Registered electors		142,551		
AIADMK hold		Swing	30.03	

=== 1989 ===
1989 Tamil Nadu Legislative Assembly election: Gobichettipalayam
Party	Candidate	Votes	%	±%
AIADMK	K. A. Sengottaiyan	37,187	38.14	−24.94
JP	T. Geetha	22,943	23.53	
INC	N. R. Thiruvenkatam	20,826	21.36	
AIADMK	A. Subramanian	14,036	14.40	−48.69
Independent	L. Selvakumar Prabu	506	0.52	
Independent	A. M. Kannusamy	468	0.48	
Independent	S. M. Nattaryan	345	0.35	
Independent	T. K. Andavan	254	0.26	
Independent	Palanisamy	236	0.24	
Independent	K. S. Krishnasamy	186	0.19	
Independent	G. R. Vijaykumar	139	0.14	
Margin of victory		14,244	14.61	−13.12
Turnout		97,496	75.73	−2.10
Registered electors		131,675		
AIADMK hold		Swing	-24.94	

=== 1984 ===
1984 Tamil Nadu Legislative Assembly election: Gobichettipalayam
Party	Candidate	Votes	%	±%
AIADMK	K. A. Sengottaiyan	56,884	63.08	3.70
DMK	M. Andamuthu	31,879	35.35	
Independent	M. A. Marimuthu	579	0.64	
Independent	K. Kaleeswaran	488	0.54	
Independent	K. Rangasamy	343	0.38	
Margin of victory		25,005	27.73	7.79
Turnout		90,173	77.83	11.35
Registered electors		120,286		
AIADMK hold		Swing	3.70	

=== 1980 ===
1980 Tamil Nadu Legislative Assembly election: Gobichettipalayam
Party	Candidate	Votes	%	±%
AIADMK	K. A. Sengottaiyan	44,703	59.38	24.39
INC	K. M. Subramaniam	29,690	39.44	13.19
Independent	K. N. K. Ramaswamy	622	0.83	
Independent	P. C. Nachimuthu	263	0.35	
Margin of victory		15,013	19.94	11.20
Turnout		75,278	66.49	2.23
Registered electors		114,861		
AIADMK hold		Swing	24.39	

=== 1977 ===
1977 Tamil Nadu Legislative Assembly election: Gobichettipalayam
Party	Candidate	Votes	%	±%
AIADMK	N. K. K. Ramasamy	25,660	34.99	
INC	N. R. Thiruvankadam	19,248	26.25	
JP	G. S. Laxmanan	16,466	22.45	
DMK	G. P. Vengidu	9,893	13.49	−45.95
Independent	K. N. Kulandivel	956	1.30	
Independent	M. K. Shanmugam	768	1.05	
Independent	G. A. Weeriah	338	0.46	
Margin of victory		6,412	8.74	−15.86
Turnout		73,329	64.25	−9.28
Registered electors		115,661		
AIADMK gain from DMK		Swing	-24.45	

=== 1971 ===
1971 Tamil Nadu Legislative Assembly election: Gobichettipalayam
Party	Candidate	Votes	%	±%
DMK	S. M. Palaniappan	35,184	59.45	
SWA	K. M. Sundaramurthy	20,623	34.84	
Independent	N. K. Kotiswaran	2,598	4.39	
Independent	M. Selambanna Gounder	782	1.32	
Margin of victory		14,561	24.60	17.08
Turnout		59,187	73.53	−5.90
Registered electors		90,363		
DMK gain from SWA		Swing	6.84	

=== 1967 ===
1967 Madras Legislative Assembly election: Gobichettipalayam
Party	Candidate	Votes	%	±%
SWA	K. M. R. Gounder	31,974	52.61	
INC	M. Gounder	27,403	45.09	−4.06
RPI	Chellaian	1,402	2.31	
Margin of victory		4,571	7.52	−15.11
Turnout		60,779	79.43	3.66
Registered electors		80,750		
SWA gain from INC		Swing	3.46	

=== 1962 ===
1962 Madras Legislative Assembly election: Gobichettipalayam
Party	Candidate	Votes	%	±%
INC	Muthuvelappa Gounder	31,977	49.14	−8.76
SWA	Sundaramurthi	17,249	26.51	
CPI	S. M. Morappan	15,841	24.35	
Margin of victory		14,728	22.64	−12.17
Turnout		65,067	75.77	22.90
Registered electors		90,860		
INC hold		Swing	-8.76	

=== 1957 ===
1957 Madras Legislative Assembly election: Gobichettipalayam
Party	Candidate	Votes	%	±%
INC	P. G. Karuthiruman	27,889	57.91	
CPI	Marappan	11,126	23.10	
Independent	Kanniappan	6,350	13.18	
Independent	P. S. Sengodan	2,798	5.81	
Margin of victory		16,763	34.80	
Turnout		48,163	52.87	
Registered electors		91,093		
INC win (new seat)				
