= K. Kalimuthu =

Indian politician

10th Speaker of the Tamil Nadu Legislative Assembly
- In office 24 May 2001 – 1 February 2006
- Deputy: A. Arunachalam
- Preceded by: P. T. R. Palanivel Rajan
- Succeeded by: R. Avudaiappan

4th Presidium Chairman of AIADMK
- In office 4 February 2006 – 8 November 2006
- General Secretary: J. Jayalalithaa
- Preceded by: C. Ponnaiyan
- Succeeded by: E. Madhusudhanan
- In office 6 May 2000 – 16 December 2002
- General Secretary: J. Jayalalithaa
- Preceded by: V. R. Nedunchezhiyan
- Succeeded by: Pulamaipithan

Personal details
- Born: 14 July 1942 Ramuthevanpatti, Virudhunagar district, Tamil Nadu
- Died: 8 November 2006 (aged 64) Chennai, Tamil Nadu
- Party: Anna Dravida Munnetra Kazhagam
- Occupation: Politician

K. Kalimuthu (14 July 1942 – 8 November 2006) was an Indian politician of the Anna Dravida Munnetra Kazhagam and Member of the Tamil Nadu Legislative Assembly. He served as the Speaker of the Tamil Nadu Legislative Assembly from 2001 to 2006. He was elected to the state Assembly 5 times and held posts as the Minister for local administration one term and as Agriculture minister for two terms under Dr. M. G. Ramachandran as chief Minister, was the Member of Lok Sabha once and Tamil Nadu Legislative Assembly speaker once. He was an M.A in Tamil. He gained a doctorate (Ph.D.) in Tamil for his literary works and wrote books and poems in Tamil. K. Kalimuthu was born in Ramuthevanpatti, Virudhunagar district, Tamil Nadu. He served twice as the presidium chairman of the AIADMK in 2000-2002 and in 2006 till his death.

He died of cardiac arrest in Chennai in November 2006.

== Political career ==
1965 Anti-Hindi Agitation

K. Kalimuthu participated in the 1965 Anti-Hindi Agitation as one of the office bearers of the Tamil Nadu Students Anti-Hindi Agitation Council. The council was established in January 1965 to coordinate opposition to the Indian government's language policy across the former Madras State.

The agitation was prompted by Union government circulars issued in 1964 under Prime Minister Lal Bahadur Shastri, which stated that Hindi would become the official language of the Union from 26 January 1965. Student organizations across Tamil Nadu organized protests, citing concerns about employment opportunities in central government positions.

The Dravida Munnetra Kazhagam (DMK), led by C. N. Annadurai, declared 26 January 1965 as a "Day of Mourning". During the protests, approximately 50,000 students marched from Napier Park to the Government Secretariat at Fort St. George.

The agitation contributed to political changes in Tamil Nadu, including the defeat of the Indian National Congress in the 1967 state assembly elections and the DMK's first electoral victory in the state. Official estimates recorded approximately 70 deaths during the protests. The movement resulted in Prime Minister Shastri's assurance that English would continue as an official language.

== Controversies ==
According to prosecution, Kalimuthu in his capacity as the then Agriculture Minister allegedly directed nine nationalised banks to provide Rs 56 lakh loan to Mayne and others for purchasing tractors in 1983. Mayne and the other accused allegedly submitted forged documents to avail loans. The charge sheet had also said Kalimuthu had parked huge amount of funds belonging to Tamil Nadu State Agricultural Marketing Board with nationalised banks. CBI had filed a charge sheet against a total of 32 persons in 1988 but only 16 were present in the court in 2016 as others either died or are absconding.

Convicting the 71-year old Mayne of offences including cheating, criminal conspiracy, forgery, the Judge sentenced him to seven years rigorous imprisonment and also imposed a hefty fine of Rs 1.67 crore on Mayne and other convicts, his accomplices. Out of the total fine amount, Rs 57 lakh should be provided to the nine banks as compensation.Others sentenced are Surya Kumar (four years RI) Shahul Hameed (two years RI), Basin Sen (two years RI) and Soma Sundaram (three years RI).

Court also acquitted 11 other accused in the case related to alleged availing of loans to the tune of Rs 56 lakh from nine nationalised banks by submitting forged documents in 1983 when Kalimuthu was Agriculture Minister in the state.
