= S. S. Ramanitharan =

Indian politician

S. S. Ramanitharan is an Indian politician and former member of the Tamil Nadu Legislative Assembly from the Anthiyur constituency. He represented the All India Anna Dravida Munnetra Kazhagam party.

== Electoral performance ==
Election	Constituency	Political party	Result	Vote %	Opposition			Ref
Election	Constituency	Political party	Result	Vote %	Candidate	Political party	Vote %	Ref
2011	Anthiyur	AIADMK	Won	54.92%	N. K. K. P. Raaja	DMK	37.25%	
