= Edappadi K. Palaniswami =

Former chief minister of Tamil (born 1954)

- Palaniswami in 2017

Member of the Tamil Nadu Legislative Assembly
- Incumbent
- Assumed office 16 May 2011
- Chief Minister: J. Jayalalithaa; O. Panneerselvam; Himself; M. K. Stalin; C. Joseph Vijay
- Preceded by: V. Kaveri
- Constituency: Edappadi
- In office 6 February 1989 – 13 May 1996
- Chief Minister: M. Karunanidhi; J. Jayalalithaa
- Preceded by: Govindaswamy
- Succeeded by: I. Ganesan
- Constituency: Edappadi

18th Leader of the Opposition in the Tamil Nadu Legislative Assembly
- In office 11 May 2021 – 10 May 2026
- Deputy: O. Pannerselvam; R. B. Udhayakumar
- Chief Minister: M. K. Stalin
- Preceded by: M. K. Stalin
- Succeeded by: Udhayanidhi Stalin

7th Chief Minister of Tamil Nadu
- In office 16 February 2017 – 6 May 2021
- Governor: C. Vidyasagar Rao; Banwarilal Purohit
- Deputy: O. Panneerselvam
- Cabinet: Palaniswami
- Preceded by: O. Panneerselvam
- Succeeded by: M. K. Stalin

Cabinet Minister Government of Tamil Nadu
- In office 23 May 2016 – 7 May 2021
- Minister: Public Works
- Chief Minister: J. Jayalalithaa; O. Panneerselvam; Himself
- Preceded by: O. Panneerselvam
- Succeeded by: E. V. Velu
- Constituency: Edappadi
- In office 23 May 2015 – 8 August 2015
- Minister: Forests
- Chief Minister: J. Jayalalithaa
- Preceded by: M. S. M. Anandan
- Succeeded by: Dindigul C. Sreenivasan
- Constituency: Edappadi
- In office 16 May 2011 – 7 May 2021
- Minister: Highways and Minor Ports
- Chief Minister: J. Jayalalithaa; O. Panneerselvam; J. Jayalalithaa; O. Panneerselvam; Himself
- Preceded by: M. P. Saminathan
- Succeeded by: E. V. Velu
- Constituency: Edappadi

Member of Parliament, Lok Sabha
- In office 10 March 1998 – 26 April 1999
- Prime Minister: Atal Bihari Vajpayee
- Preceded by: K. P. Ramalingam
- Succeeded by: M. Kannappan
- Constituency: Tiruchengode

General Secretary of the All India Anna Dravida Munnetra Kazhagam
- Incumbent
- Assumed office 11 July 2022
- Deputy: K. P. Munusamy; Natham R. Viswanathan
- Preceded by: J. Jayalalithaa (Note: V. K. Sasikala served as acting general secretary in the interim for 48 days.)

Joint Coordinator of the All India Anna Dravida Munnetra Kazhagam
- In office 21 August 2017 – 23 June 2022
- Deputy: K. P. Munusamy; R. Vaithilingam
- Coordinator: O. Panneerselvam
- Preceded by: Position established
- Succeeded by: Position abolished

Headquarters Secretary of the All India Anna Dravida Munnetra Kazhagam
- In office 8 June 2016 – 12 July 2022
- General Secretary: J. Jayalalithaa
- Coordinators: O. Panneerselvam; Himself
- Preceded by: P. Palaniappan
- Succeeded by: S. P. Velumani

Personal details
- Born: Palaniswami; 12 May 1954 (age 72) Siluvampalayam, Salem district, Madras State, India (present-day Tamil Nadu)
- Party: All India Anna Dravida Munnetra Kazhagam
- Spouse: Radha
- Children: Mithun Kumar Palaniswami
- Profession: Agriculturalist; politician
- Awards: Honorary Doctorate (2019); Paul Harris Fellow (2020)
- Nickname(s): Puratchi Thamizhar, Edappadiyaar, E.P.S.

Edappadi Karuppa Palaniswami, popularly known as EPS (born 12 May 1954), is an Indian politician who served as the seventh chief minister of Tamil Nadu from 2017 to 2021. He has been the general secretary of All India Anna Dravida Munnetra Kazhagam (AIADMK) since 28 March 2023. Previously, he has served in various leadership roles in the AIADMK since 2016.

Born in 1954 in Salem district in the erstwhile Madras State, Palaniswami was engaged in agriculture before joining electoral politics in 1974. He has represented Edappadi since 2011 as Member of the Legislative Assembly, previously also serving from 1989 to 1996. In the 1998 Indian general election, he was elected as Member of Parliament of the Lok Sabha representing Tiruchengode. Post the 2011 assembly elections, he served as the minister of highways and minor ports in the Jayalalithaa cabinet. After the 2016 assembly elections, he served as the minister of public works in the cabinet.

== Early and personal life ==
Palaniswami was born on 12 May 1954 to Karuppa Gounder and Thavasiyammal at Siluvampalayam, Salem district, Madras State (now Tamil Nadu). He discontinued B.Sc. Zoology from Sri Vasavi College. His parents were involved in agriculture and Palaniswami also chose to get involved in the same. He has two siblings, a brother Govindraj and a sister Ranjitham. He is married to Radha and they have a son.

== Political career ==
=== Early years (1974–2010) ===
Palaniswami entered politics in 1974 enrolling himself as a volunteer in All India Anna Dravida Munnetra Kazhagam (AIADMK) and served as the party's branch secretary of Koneripatti. He faced defeat in his first electoral contest in the 1986 local body elections, a result that reflected a broader trend that year in rural areas traditionally considered strongholds of the AIADMK, marking a setback for the ruling party under MGR against the opposition DMK. After MGR's death, Palaniswami supported Jayalalithaa led AIADMK faction and he was first elected to the Tamil Nadu Legislative Assembly in 1989, by contesting in AIADMK (J) faction's Rooster symbol representing Edappadi constituency. He won the re-election in 1991 from the same constituency. He later rose within the party, becoming Salem North district joint secretary in 1990 and later became Its District Secretary in 1991. He subsequently served as the Chairman of the Temple Board (1992), Chairman of the Salem District Aavin Milk Producers’ Cooperative Union (1993), and Chairman of the Tamil Nadu Cement Corporation in 2001. He lost from the same constituency in the 1996 assembly elections. In the 1998 general election, he was elected Member of Parliament, representing Tiruchengodu constituency in the 12th Lok Sabha. He subsequently lost the 1999 and 2004 general elections from the same constituency. He contested again from Edappadi in the 2006 assembly elections and lost. He was appointed propaganda secretary of AIADMK in July 2006, replacing O. S. Manian and later as organising secretary in August 2007.

=== Cabinet minister (2011–2017) ===
He was re-elected from Edappadi constituency in the 2011 assembly election. He was appointed as the minister of highways and minor ports in the Jayalalithaa cabinet. He served as the district secretary of AIADMK for Salem suburban district from June 2011 to April 2022. In 2014, he was appointed as the member of the disciplinary committee of AIADMK. He was again re-elected from the same constituency in the 2016 assembly election. After 2016 assembly elections, he also served as the ministry of public works in the cabinet. In 2016, he was appointed headquarters secretary of AIADMK, succeeding P. Palaniappan.

=== Chief minister (2017–2021) ===
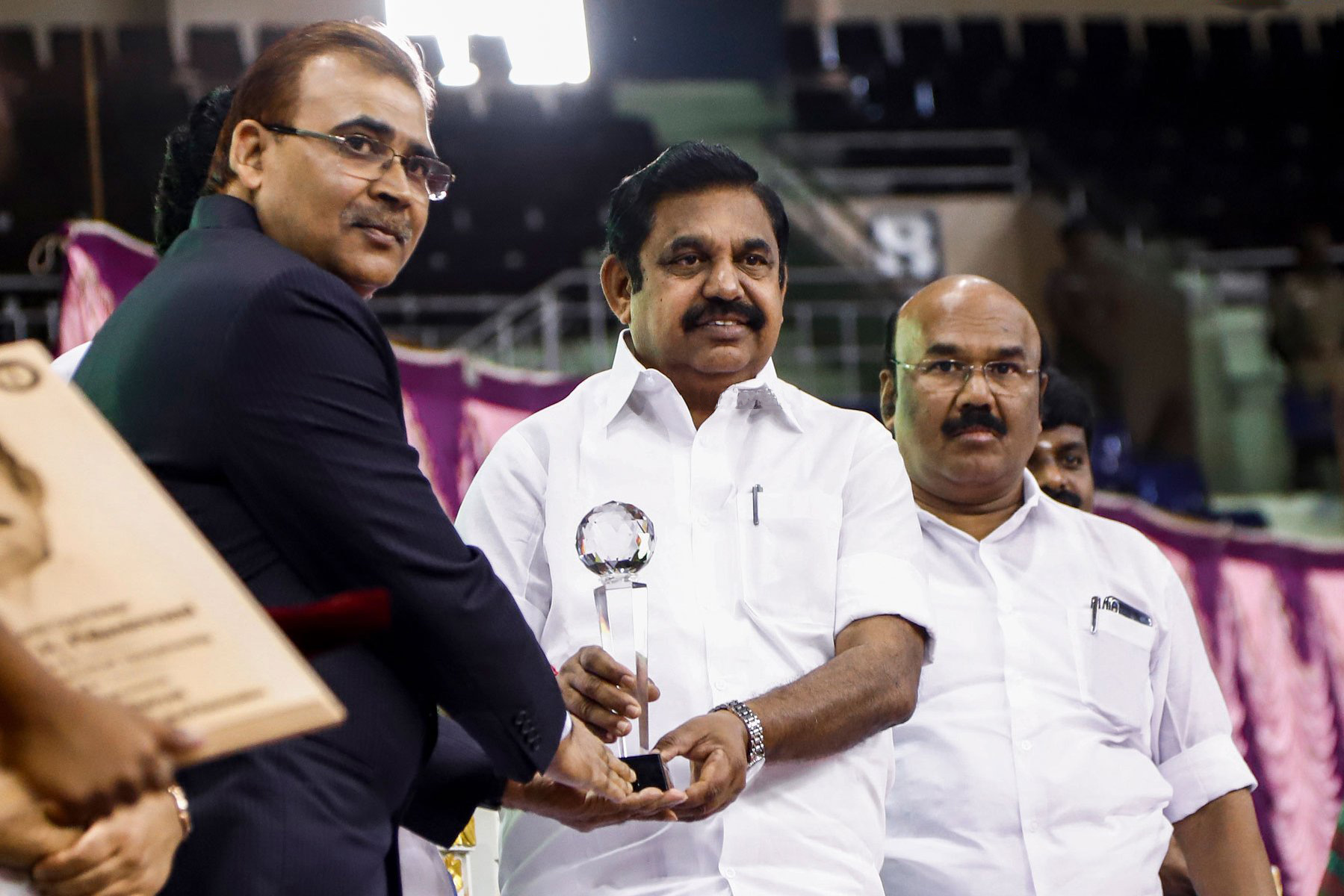
Palaniswami in 2018

Following the death of former Chief Minister Jayalalithaa on 5 December 2016, O. Panneerselvam was sworn in as the Chief Minister of Tamil Nadu on 6 December 2016. On 29 December 2016, V. K. Sasikala was unanimously elected as the General Secretary of the AIADMK by its general council. Subsequently, on 5 February 2017, she was chosen as its Chief Ministerial candidate. Panneerselvam resigned from the post of Chief Minister on 6 February 2017.

While Sasikala awaited an invitation from the Governor to form the government, the Supreme Court of India delivered its verdict in the disproportionate assets case on 14 February 2017, convicting her. On the same day, the AIADMK party elected Edappadi K. Palaniswami as its leader of legislative, and he was subsequently chosen to serve as Chief Minister in place of Sasikala. Palaniswami became the Chief Minister of Tamil Nadu on 16 February 2017 along with a 32-member cabinet and also held charge of home, prohibition and excise.

In March 2017, he introduced the Kudimaramaththu scheme for restoring minor irrigation tanks and lakes in the state. In response to the introduction of mandatory NEET exams starting in 2017, Palaniswami government formed a high-level committee led by M. Anandakrishnan in May that year to reform the Tamil Nadu school education system. The school textbook syllabus and exam pattern for classes 1 to 12 were revised on par with CBSE standards in phases, starting from the 2018–19 academic year, to better prepare students for competitive exams. On 24 April 2017, an attempted burglary occurred at one of the residences of former Tamil Nadu Chief Minister Jayalalithaa at the Kodanad Estate. During the incident, a security guard was killed and another was injured. Further, a suspect in the case, along with two family members of another suspect, died in a separate road accidents.

In May 2018, police opened fire on protests against a copper plant owned by Vedanta that was allegedly polluting groundwater in Thoothukudi, killing 13 people. Following these protest and police firing, the Government of Tamil Nadu ordered the permanent closure of the plant on 28 May 2018. Following the Supreme Court's verdict of 16 February 2018, delivered amid the Cauvery water dispute, which allocated 404.25 tmcft to Tamil Nadu and 284.75 tmcft to Karnataka while retaining the existing shares of other stakeholders, the Union Government was directed to constitute the Cauvery River Management Board (CRMB) within 40 days to implement the Cauvery Water Disputes Tribunal award and the Court's judgement, Palaniswami led Tamil Nadu government pressed the centre for the implementation of Cauvery management scheme, while AIADMK MPs disrupted Parliament for 22 days. After Tamil Nadu filed a contempt plea, the Union Government submitted the scheme on 14 May 2018. Subsequently, the Cauvery Water Management Authority was constituted through a Central Gazette notification on 1 June 2018.

On 15 August 2018, Palaniswami announced a 2% sub-quota in select government jobs and State Public Sector Undertakings for national, state, and international-level medal-winning sportspersons in games organised by recognised federations, later increasing it to 3% on 16 October 2018. His administration was lauded for its preparedness and efforts to tackle the Cyclone Gaja that hit Tamil Nadu in November 2018. In August 2019, Palaniswami introduced dedicated patrol vehicles (Amma patrol) to ascertain the security of women and children in public places. On 19 November 2018, three AIADMK members convicted in the Dharmapuri bus burning case were released prematurely by the Government of Tamil Nadu. The Governor had earlier returned the file seeking remission, however, the state government resubmitted it, after which the Governor granted approval.

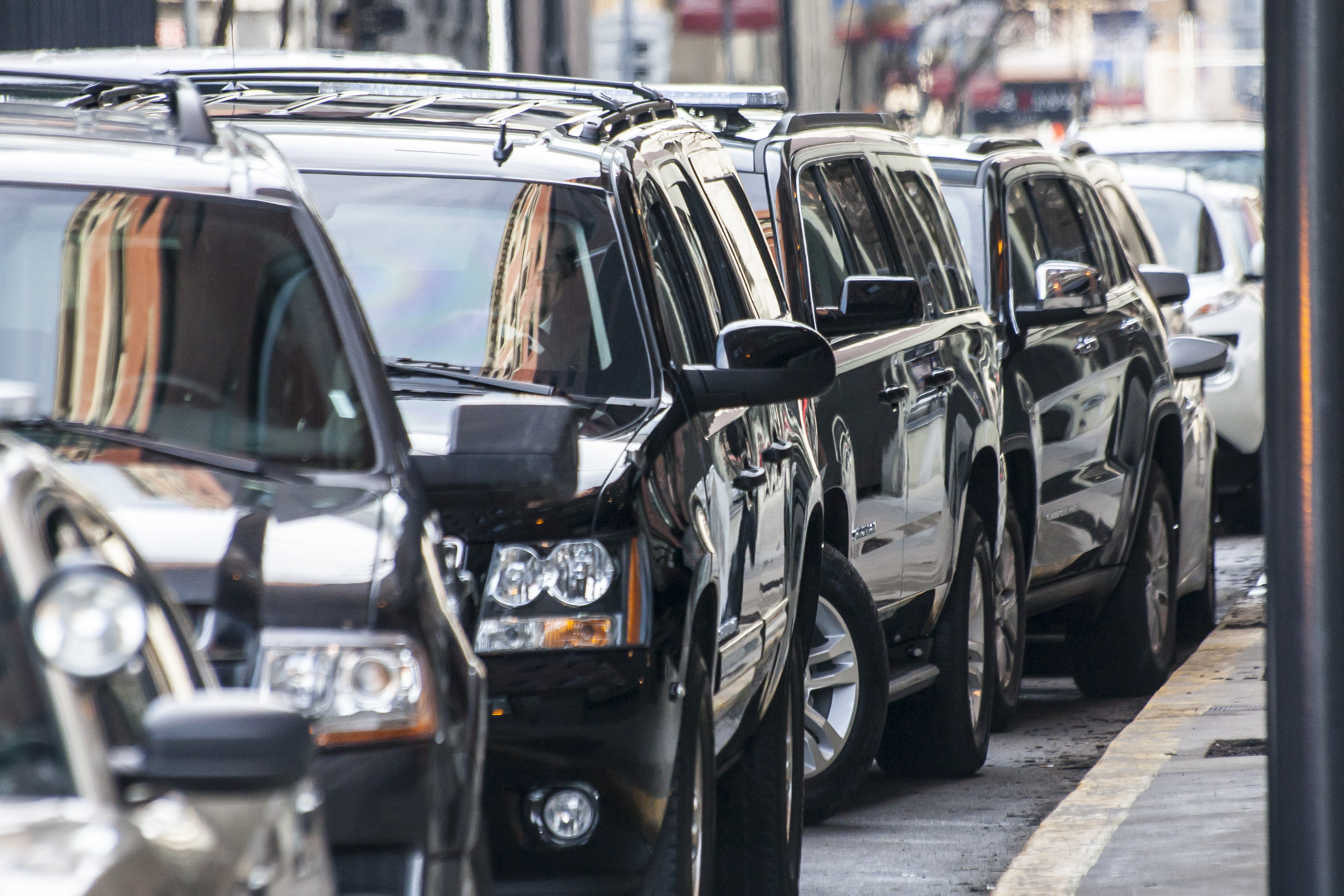
The convoy of former Chief Minister Edappadi K. Palaniswami was reportedly codenamed “Echo”. Security arrangements for the convoy included temporary traffic regulation at major junctions and advance route security measures. Reports stated that around 400 police personnel were deployed for convoy security operations.

In the 2019 Indian general election, AIADMK under the leadership of Palaniswami, contested in alliance with the Bharatiya Janata Party and won only a single seat. In 2019, Palaniswami launched the Yaadhum Oore programme aimed at garnering foreign investment in the state. He visited United States, United Kingdom and United Arab Emirates to promote the same. His administration created new districts such as Tenkasi, Kallakurichi, Tirupattur, Ranipet and Chengalpattu in 2019, and Mayiladuthurai in 2020, by carving them out from existing districts. After six decades of waiting by the people, Palaniswami laid the foundation stone for the ₹1,652-crore Athikadavu–Avinashi Groundwater Recharge and Drinking Water Supply Scheme on 28 February 2019, and the project work commenced on 25 December that year.

In 2019, a sexual assault case was reported in Pollachi town, in which eight women were officially identified as survivors, while reports indicated that at least 60 women may have been affected between 2016 and 2018. The survivors were allegedly blackmailed, sexually assaulted, and videographed. The identities of survivors were revealed by the Coimbatore Superintendent of Police during a press conference, which drew criticism. The case was later transferred to the Central Bureau of Investigation (CBI) for further investigation. CBI arrested nine men, including an AIADMK students’ wing secretary, on charges of criminal conspiracy, sexual harassment, rape, and gang rape, including repeated assaults on the same victim. In 2025, all nine men were convicted and sentenced to life imprisonment. The court also directed the state government to pay a total compensation of ₹85 lakh to eight survivors.

In February 2020, the Government of Tamil Nadu declared the Kaveri delta region as a protected special agriculture zone. In May 2020, the government passed an order for reservation of 7.5% of seats in government medical colleges to students from public schools while also announcing a plan to set up eleven new government medical colleges with 1,650 seats. After the first three phases of excavation by the Archaeological Survey of India (ASI) at Keezhadi between 2014 and 2017, the state department of archaeology took over further excavations in consultation with the ASI. In the fourth phase of excavations in 2017–18 done at a cost of ₹5.5 million (US$57,000), 5,820 artefacts and brick constructions dating back to the Sangam era were excavated. On 20 July 2020, Palaniswami laid the foundation for the Keezhadi museum in Sivaganga district to showcase the artefacts unearthed from Keezhadi excavation site.

Under his governance, Tamil Nadu was rated among the top states based on a composite index in the context of sustainable development according to the Public Affairs Index released by the Public Affairs Center in October 2020. During the coronavirus pandemic, Tamil Nadu was one of the few states that did not register negative growth. Tamil Nadu was ranked as the best performing big state from the year 2018 to 2021 based on a study conducted by India Today. On 5 January 2021, his government announced that the Thaipusam festival would be included in the list of public holidays every year.

==== Tussle with Pannerselvam ====
The tussle between Palaniswami and Pannerselvam started in October 2020 when minister for milk and dairy development K. T. Rajenthra Bhalaji tweeted that the party should go for elections, with Palaniswami as the chief ministerial candidate. A day before Balaji's tweet, cooperative minister Sellur K. Raju said, "MLAs will elect the chief minister" when AIADMK wins the 2021 elections. Later, Panneerselvam made the announcement that Palaniswami would be the chief ministerial candidate of the AIADMK on 7 October 2020 at a meeting at the AIADMK office in Chennai.

=== Leader of the opposition (2021–2026) ===
AIADMK lost the 2021 assembly elections and Palaniswami resigned as the chief-minister on 6 May 2021. He won for the third consecutive time from the Edappadi constituency and was elected as the leader of the opposition in the Tamil Nadu Legislative Assembly. On 10 May 2021, the newly elected AIADMK MLAs convened to choose the new Leader of the Opposition, an important post equivalent to a cabinet minister. The meeting was inconclusive, with both Panneerselvam and Palaniswami staking claims to the post, while their supporters hurled charges against each other. This included a prolonged quarrel between the two sections of the party outside the party's head office, causing unrest. Supporters of Palaniswami believed that he should be the Leader of the Opposition due to the party's good performance in the election in western Tamil Nadu, the region he hails from; whereas, Panneerselvam's supporters felt that the party fared poorly in other regions of the state due to Palaniswami's wrong policies during his Chief Ministerial tenure. Eventually, Palaniswami was elected as the Leader of the Opposition.

In June 2022, district secretaries and senior party members of AIADMK spoke out against the “dual leadership” system of Palaniswami and O. Panneerselvam. The supporters of Palaniswami pushed for the change in the party's leadership structure to appoint him as the general secretary of AIADMK ahead of the general council meeting on 23 June 2022, which was expected to elect the leadership of the party. In June 2022, Palaniswami wrote to Panneerselvam asserting the latter ceased to be the party coordinator as the amendments made to the party's bylaw in the 2021 December executive committee meeting were not recognised in the general council meeting held on 23 June.

On 11 July 2022, the general council of AIADMK abolished the dual leadership model, appointing Palaniswami as the interim chief and expelled Panneerselvam and his loyalists from the primary memberships of the party for "anti-party" activities. While on 17 August, the Madras High Court nullified the decisions of the AIADMK general council and ordered maintaining a status quo, a division bench later upheld the decisions and set aside the previous court order on 2 September 2022. On 23 February 2023, the Supreme Court of India upheld the later order of the Madras High Court, effectively handing the leadership of the party to Palaniswami. On 28 March 2023, AIADMK announced that Palaniswami was elected as the general secretary through party's general secretary election. On 20 April 2023, the Election Commission of India recognised Palaniswami as the general secretary, acknowledging the amendments to the party constitution and changes to list of office-bearers. On 20 August 2023, a conference was held at Madurai led by Palaniswami as a part of the Golden Jubilee celebrations of the founding of AIADMK. On 25 September 2023, Palaniswami led AIADMK officially left the National Democratic Alliance ahead of the 2024 Indian general election due to the then BJP Tamil Nadu leadership under K. Annamalai passing defamatory comments on former leaders C. N. Annadurai and J. Jayalalithaa.

In the aftermath of the 2023 Chennai floods, Palaniswami demanded the chief minister of Tamil Nadu to release a white paper on the completed and ongoing stormwater drain work in Chennai and further criticised the state government for the lack of preparedness. In the 2024 general election, Palaniswami led AIADMK formed an alliance with Desiya Murpokku Dravida Kazhagam, Puthiya Tamilagam, and Social Democratic Party of India and contested 36 seats in the state of Tamil Nadu and one each in the union territories of Puducherry and Andaman and Nicobar Islands. The party-led alliance failed to win any seats in the elections. Palaniswami has been placed under Z+ scale category security by the Ministry of Home Affairs due to bomb threats since 5 July 2025.

Ahead of the 2026 Tamil Nadu Assembly elections, Palaniswami launched the Makkalai Kaappom, Thamizhagathai Meetpom (Let us protect the people and reclaim Tamil Nadu) statewide campaign tour covering all 234 constituencies in phases, starting from Mettupalayam in Coimbatore on 7 July 2025.

On 17 April 2026, Palaniswami stated that the Delimitation Bill would not affect any state and that the Union government had assured that Tamil Nadu would not be impacted. He also expressed support for the Union government regarding the bill. However, the bill was subsequently defeated in the Lok Sabha.

=== Continued defeat ===
After the party's defeat in 2026 election, aand ADMK got relegated to third place, he moved from Sevvandhi illam at Raja Annamalaipuram, Chennai, where he was allotted a government residence while becoming a minister in 2011 and settled at a new residence at No. 4/32 of Deiva Sigamani Street in Royapettah’s Balaji Nagar.

== Elections contested and positions held ==
=== Lok Sabha elections ===
Elections	Lok Sabha	Constituency	Political party	Result	Vote percentage	Opposition		
Elections	Lok Sabha	Constituency	Political party	Result	Vote percentage	Candidate	Political party	Vote percentage
1998	12th	Tiruchengode	AIADMK	Won	54.70%	K. P. Ramalingam	DMK	40.89%
1999	13th	Tiruchengode	AIADMK	Lost	48.53%	M. Kannappan	MDMK	49.08%
2004	14th	Tiruchengode	AIADMK	Lost	37.27%	Subbulakshmi Jagadeesan	DMK	58.02%

=== Tamil Nadu Legislative Assembly elections ===
Elections	Assembly	Constituency	Political party	Result	Vote percentage	Opposition		
Elections	Assembly	Constituency	Political party	Result	Vote percentage	Candidate	Political party	Vote percentage
1989	9th	Edappadi	AIADMK(J)	Won	33.08%	L. Palanisamy	DMK	31.62%
1991	10th	Edappadi	AIADMK	Won	58.24%	P. Kolandai Gounder	PMK	25.03%
1996	11th	Edappadi	AIADMK	Lost	28.21%	I. Ganesan	PMK	37.68%
2006	13th	Edappadi	AIADMK	Lost	41.06%	V. Kaveri	PMK	44.80%
2011	14th	Edappadi	AIADMK	Won	56.38%	M. Karthe	PMK	37.66%
2016	15th	Edappadi	AIADMK	Won	43.74%	N. Annadurai	PMK	25.12%
2021	16th	Edappadi	AIADMK	Won	65.97%	Sampath Kumar	DMK	28.04%
2026	17th	Edappadi	AIADMK	Won	57.67%	K. Premkumar	IND	19.68%

=== Position in Parliament of the Republic of India ===
Elections	Position	Elected constituency	Term in office		
Elections	Position	Elected constituency	Assumed office	Left office	Time in office
1998	Member of Parliament, Lok Sabha	Tiruchengode	10 March 1998	26 April 1999	1 year, 47 days

=== Positions in Tamil Nadu Legislative Assembly ===
Elections	Position	Elected constituency	Term in office		
Elections	Position	Elected constituency	Assumed office	Left office	Time in office
1989	Member of the Legislative Assembly	Edappadi	6 February 1989	30 January 1991	1 year, 358 days
1991	Member of the Legislative Assembly	Edappadi	1 July 1991	13 May 1996	4 years, 317 days
2011	Minister for Highways and Minor Ports	Edappadi	16 May 2011	21 May 2016	5 years, 5 days
2011	Minister for Forests	Edappadi	23 May 2015	8 August 2015	77 days
2016	Minister for Public Works, Highways and Minor Ports	Edappadi	23 May 2016	15 February 2017	268 days
2016	Chief Minister	Edappadi	16 February 2017	6 May 2021	4 years, 79 days
2021	Leader of the Opposition	Edappadi	11 May 2021	5 May 2026	4 years, 359 days
2026	Member of the Legislative Assembly	Edappadi	11 May 2026	Incumbent	171 days

== Awards and honours ==
=== Honorary doctorates ===
No.	Conferred in	Conferred by	Location	Country	Work	Ref.
1	2019	Dr. M.G.R. Educational and Research Institute	Tamil Nadu	India	For his outstanding contributions to public affairs	

=== Other honours ===
No.	Image	Decoration	Field	Conferred date	Conferred by	Ref.
1		Paul Harris Fellow	Public Affairs	11 July 2020	The Rotary Foundation	

== See also ==
- Edappadi K. Palaniswami ministry
