= KCA Bangalore =

Catholic cultural association in India

KCA, Bangalore
- Abbreviation: KCA (Kanara Catholic Association)
- Formation: 1955
- Type: Non Profit Catholic Organisation
- Purpose: Social and Charitable purposes for Catholics from the Kanara Region
- Headquarters: Bangalore
- Members: 1,800
- Official language: English
- President (2020-22): Hilma Roach
- Website: www.kcabangalore.com

Kanara Catholic Association (KCA), is one of the cultural organisations of the Mangalorean Catholic community in India.

A scholarship corpus fund started in the 1960s, has facilitated financial assistance even to this day, to several deserving students of the Mangalorean Catholic Community in Bangalore.

KCA is a major contributor in terms of land and funds to the Konkan Samudai Bhavan (KSB), which is a building to help members of the Kanara Catholic Community. One of the major aims of the KSB is to provide subsidised accommodations for Catholic youth who come from the Konkan area to Bangalore in search of jobs or help in the early part of their careers.

In a Landmark event, during the Annual General Body meeting of 2018, the Chief Postmaster General of Karnataka, Government of India, His Excellency, Dr. Charles Lobo, in the presence of members and the newly elected committee, released a stamp commemorating the Monti Fest Festival of the Mangalorean catholics, which is celebrated worldwide by the community on 8 September to honour the Virgin Mary and is connected to the Harvest festival which is also celebrated in India with great gusto.

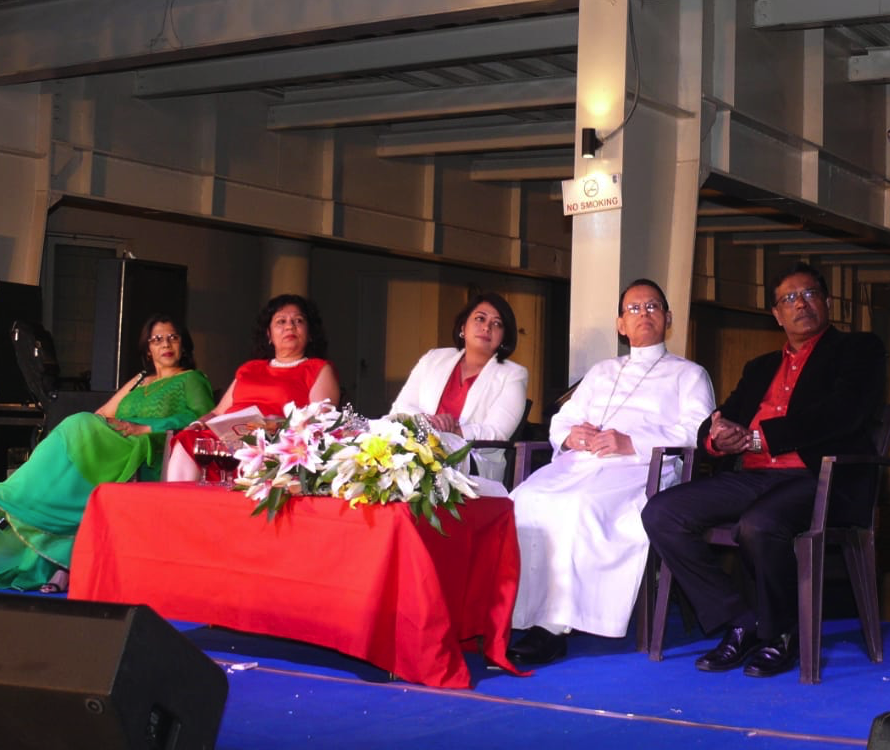
KCA 'Face of the Year Award' presented to Faye D'Souza of Mirror Now, by His Excellency, Bishop Henry D'Souza. Sitting from Left: Hilma Roach, Vice President KCA, Marjorie Texeira, President KCA, Faye D'Souza, Bishop Henry D'Souza and Rafael Johnson, President of Catholic Club

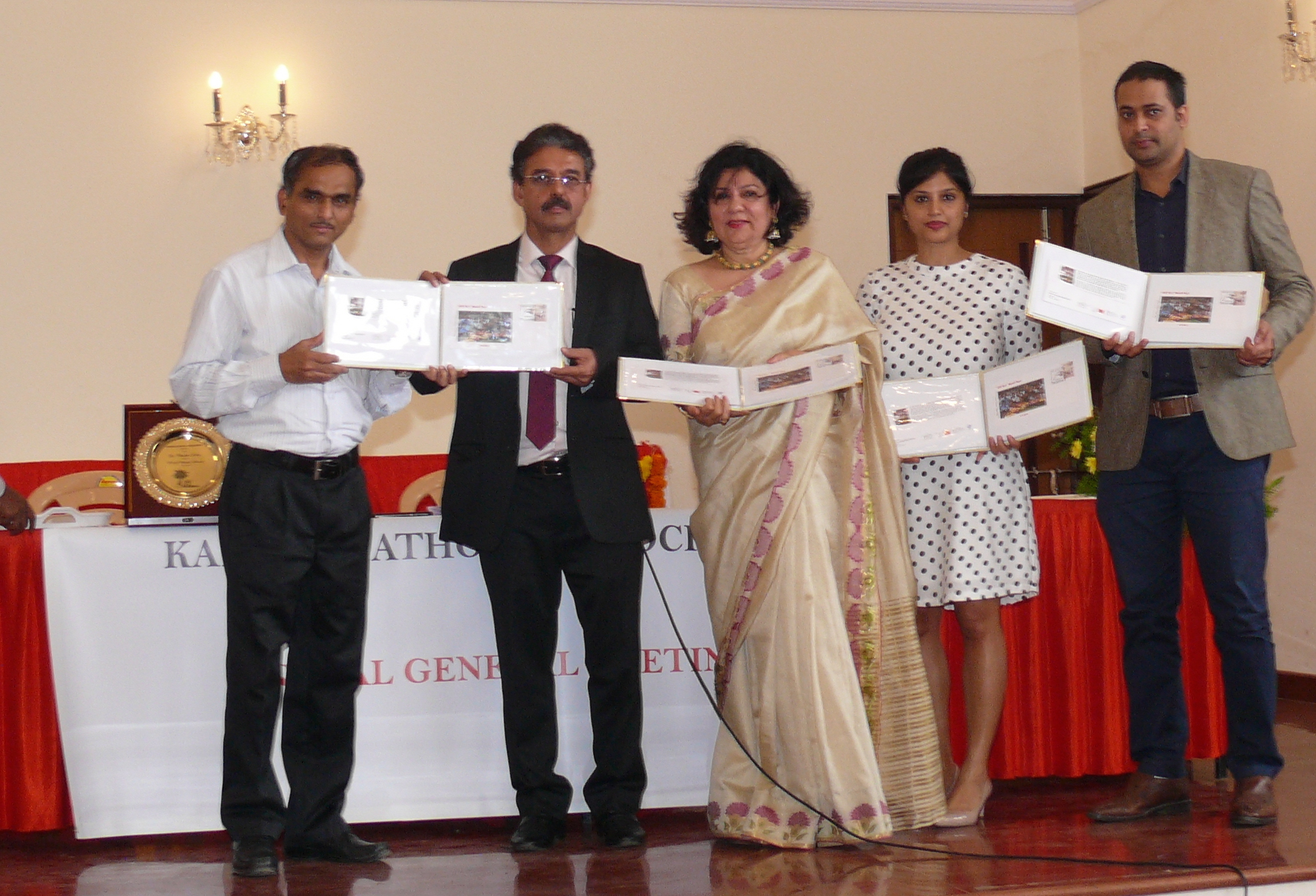
His Excellency, Dr. Charles Lobo, Chief Postmaster General for Karnataka, Govt. of India, releases a stamp at the KCA AGM on 9 September 2018 to commemorate the celebration of the Monti Fest Festival of the Mangalorean Catholic Community

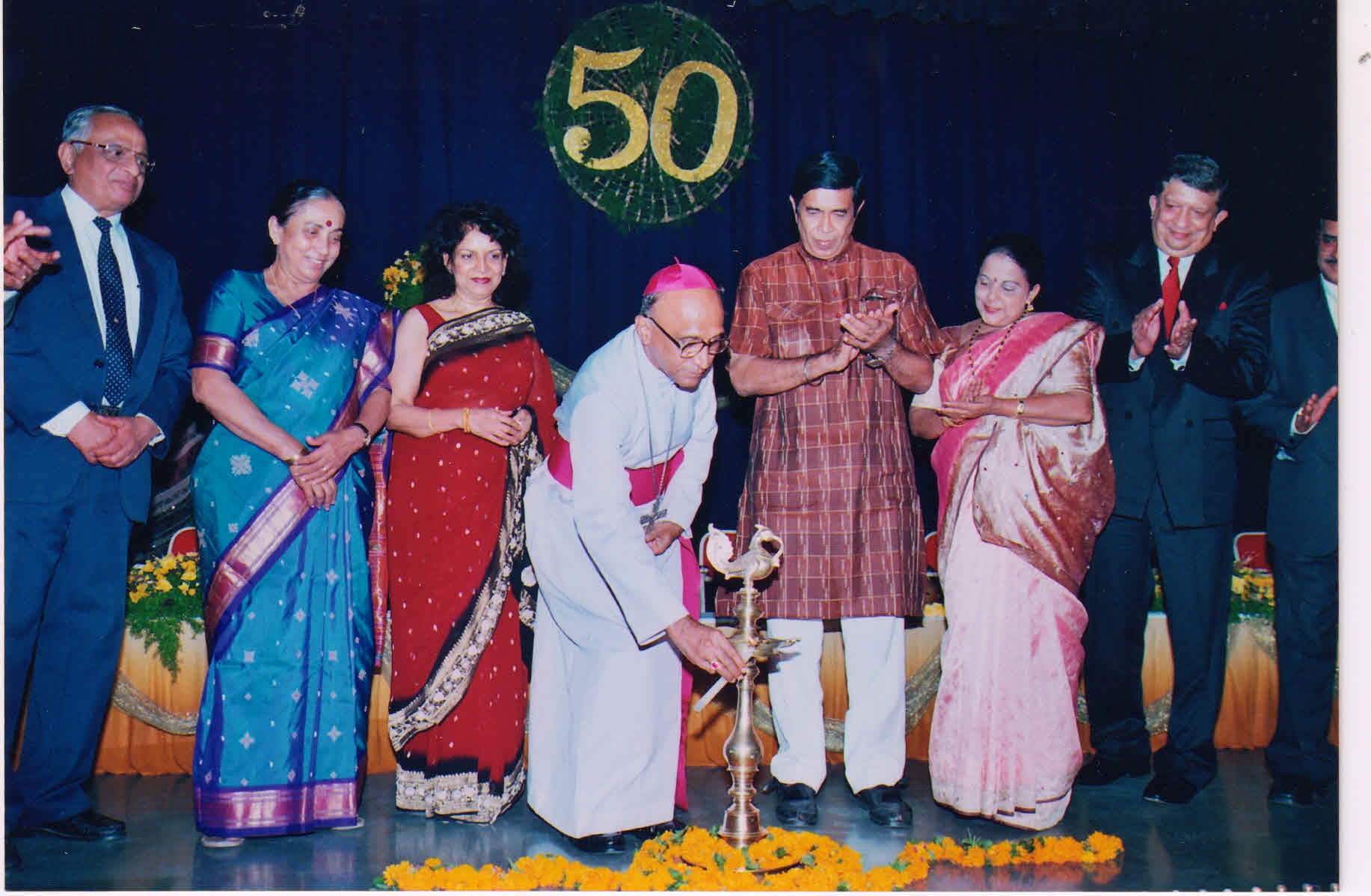
His Excellency, The Most Reverend Bernard Moras, Archbishop of Bangalore inaugurating the completion of the 50th Anniversary of KCA in the Presence of Oscar Fernandes, Former Minister, Government of India and Member of Parliament and Margaret Alva, Former Governor and Member of Parliament, Government of India

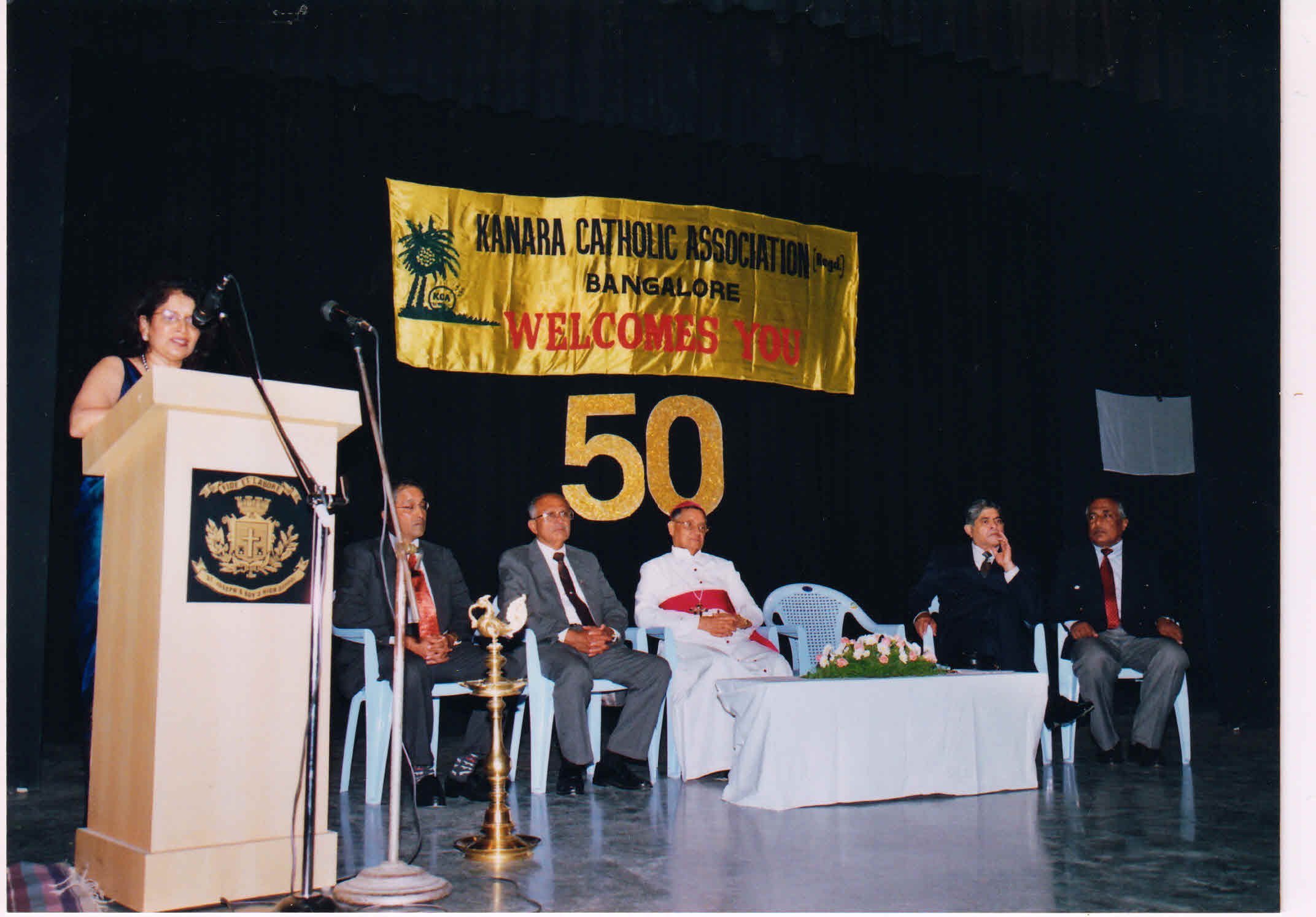
Inaugural event for the start of the 50th anniversary of KCA in the Presence of the Archbishop Emeritus of Bangalore, His Excellency, The Most Reverend Ignatius Pinto

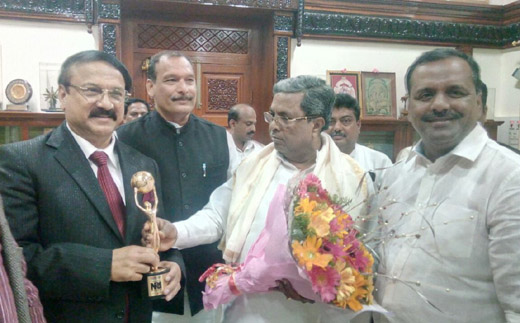
Mr. Ronald Colaco, KCA member, being felicitated by Karnataka Chief Minister, Siddaramaiah for receiving the Times Now Global NRI Award under Philanthropy. Also present are State Minister for Food and Civil Supplies, UT Khader, and Chief Whip of Karnataka Assembly and Member of Legislative Council, Ivan Dsouza

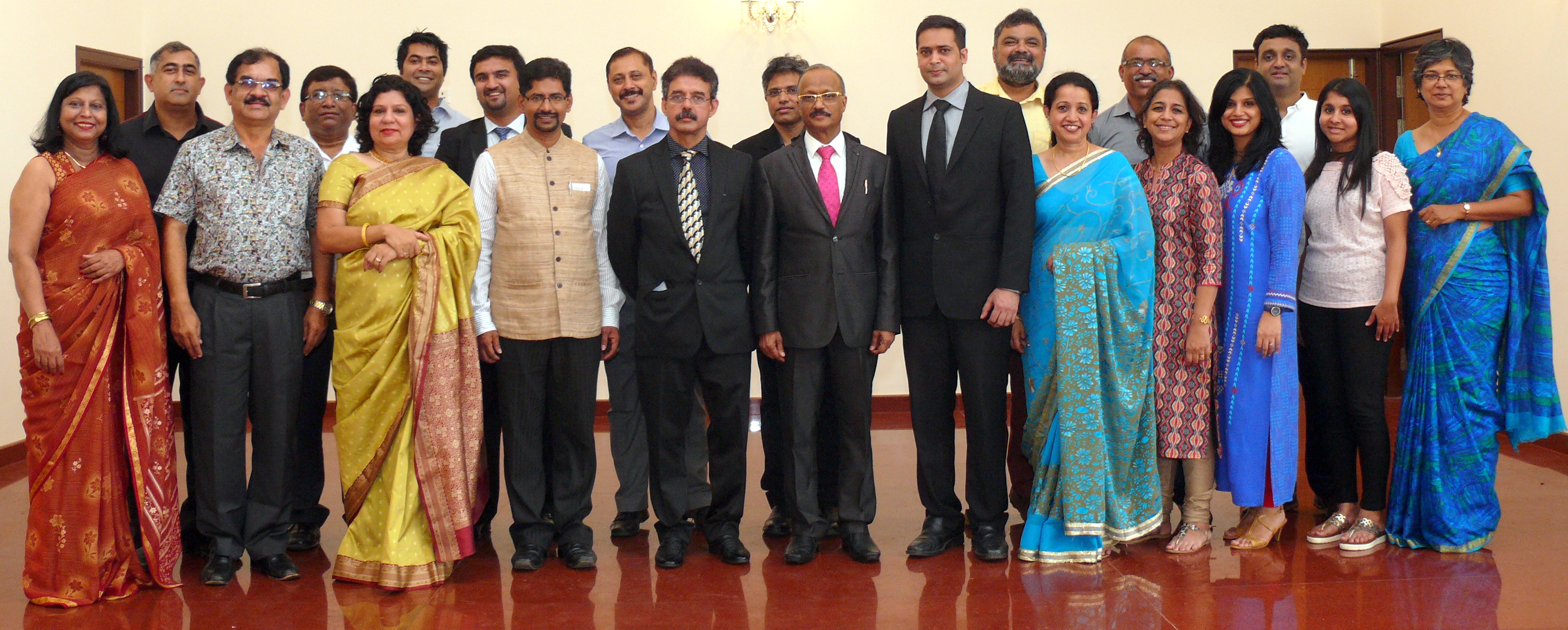
KCA Bangalore Managing Committee 2017-18 with Justice John Michael D'Cunha of the Karnataka High Court (in pink tie). Members from left: Clemence D'Silva, Dr. Joseph Rasquinha, Dr. Allan Pinto, Ivan Pinto, Marjorie Texeira, Adrian Fernandes, Nigel Colaco, Anand Edward D'Souza (FKCA Chairman), Roshan Menezes, Errol Fernandes (KCA President in white tie), Maxim Lobo, Justice D'Cunha, Ajay Fernandes, David Saldanha, Palini Pinto, Sunil Coutinho, Lavina Pinto, Harriette Rebello, Neha Menezes, Shawn D'sa and Jane Pinto. Not in Picture: Hilma Roach, Alvin Mendonca, Viren Peres and Rohan D'Souza

== Background ==
KCA Bangalore was started in 1955 thanks to the initiative of early residents Leo D'Silva, Public Notary and John D'Sa, who was later Chief Engineer of the Karnataka State Government Electricity Board and Capt. Dr. George Mathias - a well-known coffee planter. The early meetings were in the legendary Oorgaum House, the home of Rajpramukh PG D'Souza. Its mission was to promote cohesiveness and camaraderie within the community through social events, picnics and sports. KCA became a Registered body in 1988. The membership and Articles of Association were revised in 1994.

The Annual General Body Meeting of KCA has traditionally included a Church Service in Konkani, followed by lunch and entertainment. From 1993, an annual church service for Departed Members, Thanksgiving Mass in April after Easter, and Montichefest Mass in September with well-organized liturgy and choir is always conducted without fail. Cultural events have evolved from modest social gatherings in the 1950s, which introduced a touch of culture with the colourful mando, to 1995, when a cultural troupe from Mangalore led by Bennet Pinto were invited to perform at the 40th Anniversary celebration of KCA at St. Germains School, Bangalore. Cultural programmes have become a rallying force to bring the community together to participate, have fellowship, celebrate and contribute to charity causes. From 2000 onwards, "Mango Showers" and later Mood Manglowrean have showcased Mangalorean cultural heritage through skits, plays, music, dance and songs with large numbers of cultural events to promote the cohesion of the Mangalorean catholic community, which has been decreasing in numbers in India.

KCA also publishes a quarterly Newsletter called 'Khobar' from 1994. In 1995, the first Directory of Members was published. A Land and Building Fund was instituted in 1985 to harness donations from the community for charitable causes, resulting in a plot of land purchased 10 years later. Raising funds for a building turned out to be a major hurdle. In 2016, through the herculean efforts of the Konkan Welfare Trust- a joint collaboration of KCA and KONCAB, and substantial assistance from many individual benefactors both in India and across the World, a magnificent community building consisting of a hall and hostel called the Konkan Samudai Bhavan was completed.

A tradition is also the annual Thanksgiving Mass, held every year, after Easter. Donations and proceeds from this mass are given to other catholic organisations who cater to less privileged members of society. In the last few years, donations from these masses have been given to the Little Sisters of the Poor, the Leprosy Home at Sumanahally Bangalore, the home for AIDS patients on Sarjapur Road run by the Camillian Fathers, Asha Niketan Koramangala a home for the intellectually disabled, part of the L'Arch communities started by Jean Vanier in France in 1970 and others

The KCA celebrated its golden jubilee in 2004-2005 under the stewardship of the first Lady President of KCA, Dr. Pat Pinto.

== Committee ==
The KCA is run by an Honorary Committee which is elected by the AGM every year. Committee members are responsible for organising all the KCA events, with all the proceeds going to charity.

Honorary Committee Members for 2020-2022
| Designation | Name of the Member | Designation | Name of the Member |
|---|---|---|---|
| President | Hilma Roach | Vice President | Roshan Menezes |
| Secretary | Lunita Pais D'Sa | Joint Secretary | Jane Pinto |
| Treasurer | Ajay Fernandes | Past President | Marjorie Texeira |
| Committee Member | Adrian D'Souza | Committee Member | Hariette Rebello |
| Committee Member | Dr. Joseph Rasquinha | Committee Member | Palini Pinto |
| Committee Member | Ivan Pinto | Committee Member | Clemence D'Silva |
| Committee Member | Shoba Pinto | Committee Member | Karen Prabhu |
| Committee Member | Lavina Lobo | Committee Member | Shanti Peres |
| Committee Member | Rowan Pais | Committee Member | Veena Serrao |
| Committee Member | Mariette Vaz | Committee Member | Cheryl Rebello |
