= V. K. Sasikala =

Indian politician (born 1954)

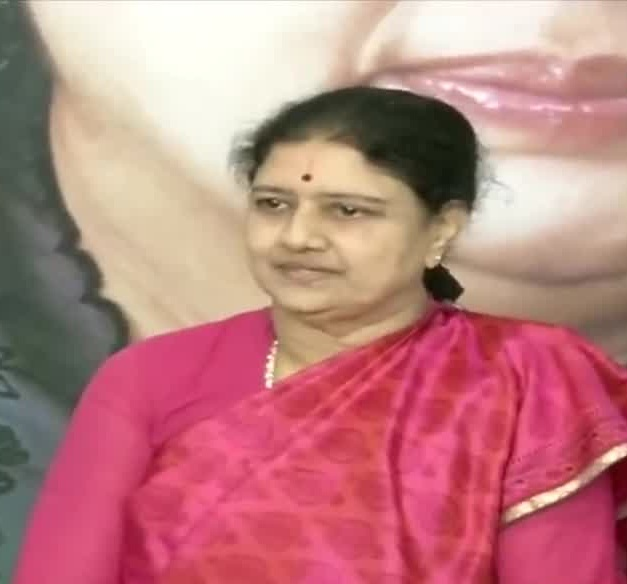

General Secretary of the All India Puratchi Thalaivar Makkal Munnettra Kazhagam
- Incumbent
- Assumed office 24 February 2026
- Preceded by: Position established

General Secretary of the Amma Makkal Munnettra Kazagam Faction (Note: Functioned as unregistered party)
- In office 15 March 2018 – 19 April 2019
- Preceded by: Position established
- Succeeded by: Position abolished (Note: T. T. V. Dhinakaran as registered party)

Acting General Secretary of the All India Anna Dravida Munnetra Kazhagam
- In office 31 December 2016 – 17 February 2017
- Deputy: T. T. V. Dhinakaran (from 14 Feb)
- Preceded by: J. Jayalalithaa
- Succeeded by: Edappadi K. Palaniswami

Member of the AIADMK Chief Executive Council
- In office 17 December 2010 – 12 September 2017

Member of the AIADMK General Council
- In office 9 October 2000 – 12 September 2017

Personal details
- Born: Vivekanandan Krishnaveni Sasikala; 18 August 1954 (age 72) Thiruthuraipoondi, Madras State (present day Tamil Nadu), India
- Party: All India Puratchi Thalaivar Makkal Munnettra Kazhagam (Since 2026)
- Other political affiliations: All India Anna Dravida Munnetra Kazhagam (until 1996, 1997–2011, 2012–2017); Amma Makkal Munnetra Kazhagam (2018–2021)
- Spouse: M. Natarajan (m. 1973; died 2018)
- Relatives: T. T. V. Dhinakaran (nephew)
- Occupation: Politician

Sasikala Natarajan, born as Vivekanandan Krishnaveni Sasikala on 18 August 1954, is an Indian politician who was briefly the Chief Minister-elect of Tamil Nadu in February 2017. She was a close confidante of J. Jayalalithaa, the late chief minister of Tamil Nadu, who headed the All India Anna Dravida Munnetra Kazhagam (AIADMK) from 1989 until her death in 2016. She is also the aunt of AMMK general secretary T. T. V. Dhinakaran. She is noted for her short-lived cult of personality in Tamil Nadu as a successor of Jayalalithaa before being convicted by the Supreme Court of India for money laundering. Her cadres revered her as their "Puratchi Thaai Chinnamma" (Revolutionary Small Mother).

After Jayalalithaa's death, the Minister of Finance O. Paneerselvam, who had served as the acting Chief Minister of Tamil Nadu during Jayalalithaa's hospitalization, was sworn in as the official Chief Minister. However, the AIADMK general council elected Sasikala as the party's interim secretary-general, revealing a factional split within the party. In February 2017, the AIADMK MLAs subsequently elected Sasikala as the party's leader in Tamil Nadu Legislative Assembly, making her the Chief Minister-elect, following which Paneerselvam tendered his resignation. Sasikala submitted her chief-ministerial petition to the Tamil Nadu Governor C. Vidyasagar Rao, shortly after which a two-bench Supreme Court jury pronounced Sasikala guilty in a disproportionate-assets case involving Jayalalithaa, and ordered her immediate arrest, effectively ending Sasikala's chief ministerial ambitions. She was then imprisoned in the Bangalore Central Prison, Karnataka. From prison, she selected Edappadi K. Palaniswami as the next Chief Minister.

Palaniswami and other ministers removed her from the secretary-general post and dismissed her from the party in September 2017, after reuniting with the Paneerselvam faction. Sasikala was released in January 2021, and she sued Palaniswami, Paneerselvam, and associates for unlawful expulsion from the party. The expulsion was upheld by the Madras High Court in December 2023. Her nephew Dhinakaran launched Amma Makkal Munnettra Kazhagam (AMMK) in March 2018 as an unregistered party, with Sasikala as its general-secretary. Dhinakaran replaced her in April 2019, after registering the party. Following disgreements with him, Sasikala quit AMMK, which entered an alliance with the Palaniswami-led AIADMK. She then joined a party founded by her supporters, the All India Puratchi Thalaivar Makkal Munnetra Kazhagam (AIPTMMK), in March 2026.

== Personal life ==
Sasikala was born on 18 August 1954 to C. Vivekanandam Saluvar and V. Krishnaveni in Thiruthuraipoondi, located in the present-day Tiruvarur district. Her parents belonged to an influential Kallar (Thevar) family and later moved to Mannargudi.

She had four brothers: V. K. Dhivakaran, T. V. Sundaravadanam (died in 2020), Vinodhagan (died in 1993) and V. Jayaraman (died in 1991); and one sister, B. Vanithamani (died in 2011). Her marriage to Maruthappa Natarajan in 1973 was presided over by DMK leader M. Karunanidhi. Natarajan died on 20 March 2018. The two did not have any children.

== Career ==
=== All India Anna Dravida Munnetra Kazhagam ===
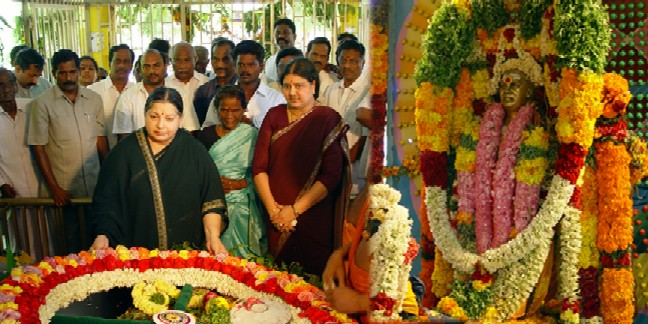
Sasikala with Jayalalithaa in Late 2000s at Pasumpon Thevar Memorial

Sasikala's husband was a public relations officer in the government of Tamil Nadu, who worked closely with the district collector of South Arcot, V. S. Chandralekha, who in turn was very close to Tamil Nadu chief minister M. G. Ramachandran. These connections helped introduce Sasikala to J. Jayalalithaa, who was the propaganda secretary of the All India Anna Dravida Munnetra Kazhagam (AIADMK) at the time. Since Sasikala helped cover video of party meetings and distribution of policies of AIADMK through CDs, a friendship developed between the two and they became very close.

Sasikala became the person most trusted by Jayalalithaa. After Ramachandran's death and the public humiliation of Jayalalithaa by AIADMK cadres who assaulted her at the funeral, Sasikala brought her relatives and 40 other people from Mannargudi for Jayalalithaa's protection. Jayalalithaa took control of AIADMK from Ramachandran's widow V. N. Janaki, and Sasikala moved into her Poes Garden residence in 1987. In February 1990, J. Jayalalithaa was involved in a car accident near Meenambakkam, Chennai, when her car collided with a lorry. She was returning to Chennai from Pondicherry with her aide, Sasikala, and both were admitted to Devaki Hospital with injuries. Sasikala had severe injury on eye, till now not. After Jayalalithaa became chief minister following the 1991 legislative assembly election, Sasikala's power and influence greatly increased and that of her relatives also. In 1992, Chief Minister Jayalalithaa's visit to the Mahamaham festival in Kumbakonam coincided with a fatal stampede that killed 48 people. The tragedy occurred on February 18, 1992, as a stampede broke out near the Mahamaham tank after a large crowd attempted to descend at the same time, partly due to the VIP presence. Jayalalithaa and her aide, V.K. Sasikala, were present, and the incident was a significant political setback for her government.

In 1995, the wedding for Sasikala's nephew V. N. Sudhakaran was held and generated significant controversy due to the extravagant display of wealth, with many people believing that the AIADMK government was significantly corrupt. Subramanian Swamy filed corruption cases against Jayalalithaa and her aides. The AIADMK lost the 1996 legislative election (also 1996 general election), particularly due to Sasikala's display of her expensive jewelry. Jayalalithaa had adopted Sudhakaran in 1995, but disowned him in 1996.

P. Chidambaram, who had promised to hold Jayalalithaa and Sasikala accountable, had the latter investigated after assuming the position of finance minister for the union government in June 1996, leading to her arrest under the Foreign Exchange Regulation Act. Jayalalithaa expelled Sasikala from AIADMK on 27 August 1996, but after Sasikala's release from jail on 1 July 1997, she rescinded her decision. When questioned on her views on Sasikala, Jayalalithaa quoted in 1996 "Sasikala never functioned as extra constitutional power centre. Calling her de facto chief minister is nonsense. She is not interested in politics and I have no intention to bring her into politics." It annoyed her when people said Sasikala was behind many of her political decisions and termed such news as rubbish and insult to her position as chief minister.

AIADMK helped bring Atal Bihari Vajpayee to power after the 1998 general election, also helped bring down his government within a few days as it withdrew its support from the coalition headed by him. Sasikala however later proclaimed that it was Jayalalithaa's own decision and she had opposed it.

Sasikala also stated that she had unsuccessfully tried to convince Jayalalithaa in 2004 to release Jayendra Saraswathi, who was arrested over the Sankararaman murder case, adding that she feared it would damage the image of AIADMK. The incident would play a role in turning the Tamil Brahmins against the party.

On 19 December 2011, Jayalalithaa expelled Sasikala and 13 others, including Sasikala's husband, M. Natarajan, her nephew T. T. V. Dhinakaran, their relatives, and Jayalalithaa's former foster son V. N. Sudhakaran from the AIADMK. This act of Jayalalithaa was considered as an attempt to prove that she was not under the influence of Sasikala and her family. The matter was resolved by 31 March 2012, when Sasikala was reinstated as a party member after issuing a written apology. Sasikala later proclaimed this as "drama", stating that it was only done to uncover the roles played by people like Cho Ramaswamy and a police officer who was heading the intelligence then who were against her and Jayalalithaa. In 2014, she was jailed with Jayalalithaa and 2 others in Bangalore Jail, later released.

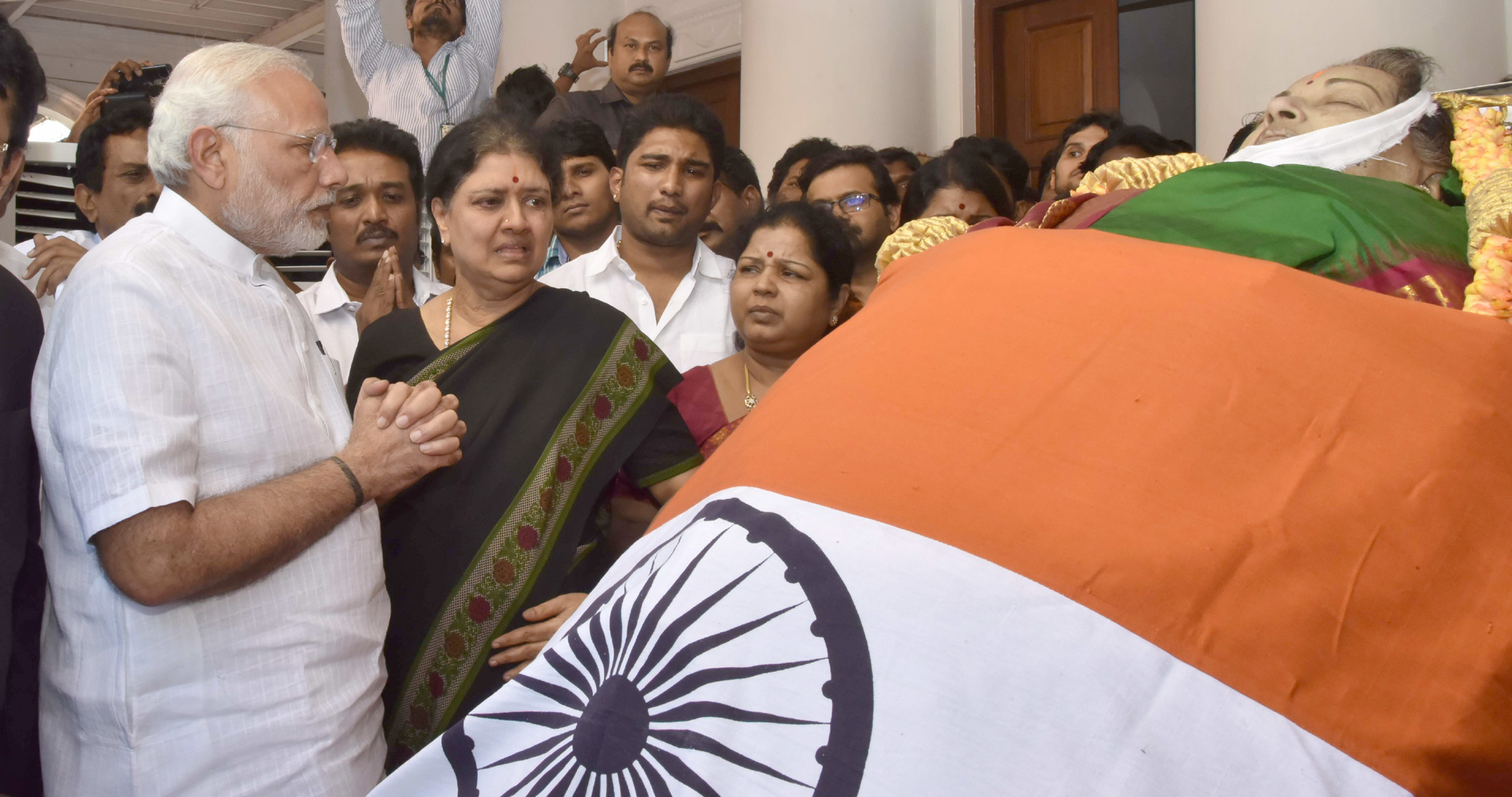
Sasikala stands by the mortal remains of Jayalalithaa, along with Prime Minister Modi in December 2016

In a meeting held on 29 December 2016 – the first meeting after Jayalalithaa's death on 5 December 2016 – the AIADMK General Council appointed Sasikala as the party's temporary general secretary until a formal election was held for the post.

On 5 February 2017, Sasikala was unanimously elected as the AIADMK Legislature Party Leader by a meeting of all the MLAs in the party. Tamil Nadu governor C. Vidyasagar Rao accepted the resignation of Chief Minister O. Panneerselvam on 6 February, and instructed him to continue functioning as acting chief minister "until alternate arrangements are made". Later Pannerselvam made mediation in Jayalalithaa's memorial on 7 February and he was threatened to make resignation. The governor delayed announcing Sasikala as the new Chief Minister, waiting for the verdict of the disproportionate assets case against her. On 14 February 2017, Sasikala was convicted and sentenced to four years in Bangalore's Parappana Agrahara Jail and was given 24 hours to surrender by Supreme Court judges Binaki Chandra Bose & Amitva Roy. The governor rejected her claims to become chief minister. Sasikala then convened the party's MLA council in her capacity as the general secretary, where Edappadi K. Palaniswami was unanimously appointed as the new chief minister and sworn in the next day.

In 2017, a robbery and murder occurred at the Kodanad estate, which was associated with former Chief Minister Jayalalithaa and managed by Sasikala. The rooms used by Jayalalithaa and Sasikala were reportedly broken into during the incident, which later became a subject of political controversy in Tamil Nadu.

==== Expulsion from AIADMK ====
On 21 August 2017, it was reported that the AIADMK faction loyal to Palaniswami had decided to merge with Panneerselvam's splinter faction and expelled Sasikala as the general secretary as one of the key demands of the merger. It was reported on 28 August that Sasikala had been expelled during a party meeting, but this was later denied.

On 13 September, the AIADMK General Council cancelled Sasikala's appointment as temporary general secretary and expelled her from the party, though officials appointed to party posts by her were allowed to continue their duties. Instead, the late Jayalalithaa was named the eternal general secretary of AIADMK. Sasikala filed a case in the City Civil Court IV of Chennai in February 2021, but it upheld her dismissal as the AIADMK general secretary in April 2022. On 11 July, Palaniswami succeeded her as the interim general secretary of the party at a general council meeting.

Among the resolutions passed during Sasikala's expulsion, the AIADMK declared that her appointment as general secretary was disputable and as such, T. T. V. Dhinakaran's appointment as Deputy General Secretary as well as his decisions were cancelled.

Her appeal against her expulsion from the AIADMK was rejected by the Madras High Court in December 2023.

=== Imprisonment and return to politics ===
The expulsion of Sasikala and her family led to the creation of the Amma Makkal Munnettra Kahzagam (AMMK) on 15 March 2018 by T. T. V. Dhinakaran. Sasikala held the post of general secretary until 19 April 2019 when Dhinakaran was elected to the position. He stated that she would function as the party's president after her release from jail in a disproportionate assets case.

After being released from jail, Sasikala announced her intention to return to active politics in February 2021, but announced a change of mind on 3 March. She did not support Dhinakaran when he decided that the AMMK would participate in the 2021 Tamil Nadu Legislative Assembly election alone. After her release from jail, Panneerselvam was open to letting Sasikala back into the AIADMK, but was opposed by Palaniswami.

Sasikala confirmed in May 2021 that she would return to active politics. She later attempted to regain her political influence and released audio tapes on social media, calling on people to bring in a government modelled after Jayalalithaa's policies and push out "enemies and traitors". She also claimed that she stayed away from the AIADMK so Palaniswami and Panneerselvam would win the local elections and promised to unite the disputing factions of the party.

Dhinakaran stated in July 2021 that Sasikala was trying to reclaim the AIADMK by winning over its cadres. On 17 October she claimed that she was still the general secretary of AIADMK, and called on the party to unite for its sake as well as of the people. On 26 June 2022, she began a political tour claiming that she was trying to protect the AIADMK. A commission probing Jayalalithaa's death recommended investigating Sasikala and others in a report submitted to the state government in August 2022.

After the expulsion of Panneerselvam from AIADMK in July 2022 and Palaniswami becoming the interim general secretary of the party, Sasikala denounced Palaniswami's appointment to the position as invalid, and stated that he did not have any authority to expel Panneerselvam, while also claiming that the party cadres wanted her to become the general secretary. After his expulsion was overturned by the Madras High Court in August 2022, Panneerselvam stated that he would meet with Sasikala and Dhinakaran to unite the AIADMK. On 2 September 2022, a division bench of the Madras High Court upheld the decisions of the AIADMK general council meeting held on 11 July 2022 and set aside the previous court order of the single judge in the appeal case of Edappadi K. Palaniswami, thus effectively restoring unitary leadership. The High Court order was upheld by the Supreme Court of India by rejecting the petitions of Panneerselvam on 23 February 2023.

After the AIADMK lost by a huge margin in the 2024 Indian general election held in Tamil Nadu, Sasikala announced her return to politics and blamed "certain selfish people" within the party for its defeat.

=== All India Puratchithalaivar Makkal Munnettra Kazhagam (2026–present) ===
On 24 February 2026, Sasikala launched a new political party and its flag, thereby effectively giving away her claim over the AIADMK ahead of Tamil Nadu Assembly elections. On 13 March 2026, She announced the name of her political party, "All India Puratchithalaivar Makkal Munnettra Kazhagam".

== Conviction ==
On 14 February 2017, the Supreme Court of India found Sasikala and her co-accused – Ilavarasi (her sister-in-law) and V. N. Sudhakaran (her nephew) – guilty of conspiring, laundering, and amassing illicit wealth worth about ₹66.44 crore (equivalent to ₹396 crore or US$42 million in 2026) in the 1990s in a criminal conspiracy with Jayalalithaa. The three were sentenced to a four-year jail term, restoring in toto her earlier conviction in the case delivered on 27 September 2014. She and her relatives were sentenced to a four-year jail term with a fine of ₹10 crore (US$1.1 million) each. The judgment stipulated that she and her accomplices would serve an additional 12 months in prison if they failed to pay the fine. She is the only Indian leader who is elected as legislative party leader but not sworn as chief minister.

The Supreme Court refused her plea to surrender after a fortnight and to be allowed to have food from home, so Sasikala and Ilavarasi presented themselves for imprisonment on 15 February 2017. She was released on 27 January 2021 after her term elapsed, but was kept at Victoria Hospital to be treated for COVID-19. Her conviction in the case made her ineligible from participating in an election until 27 January 2027.
