= Edappadi Assembly constituency =

State Legislative Assembly Constituency in Tamil Nadu

Coordinates: 11.58°N 77.85°E

Edappadi
- Constituency No. 86 for the Tamil Nadu Legislative Assembly

Constituency details
- Country: India
- Region: South India
- State: Tamil Nadu
- District: Salem
- Lok Sabha constituency: Salem
- Established: 1951
- Total electors: 2,76,472
- Reservation: None

Member of Legislative Assembly
- 17th Tamil Nadu Legislative Assembly
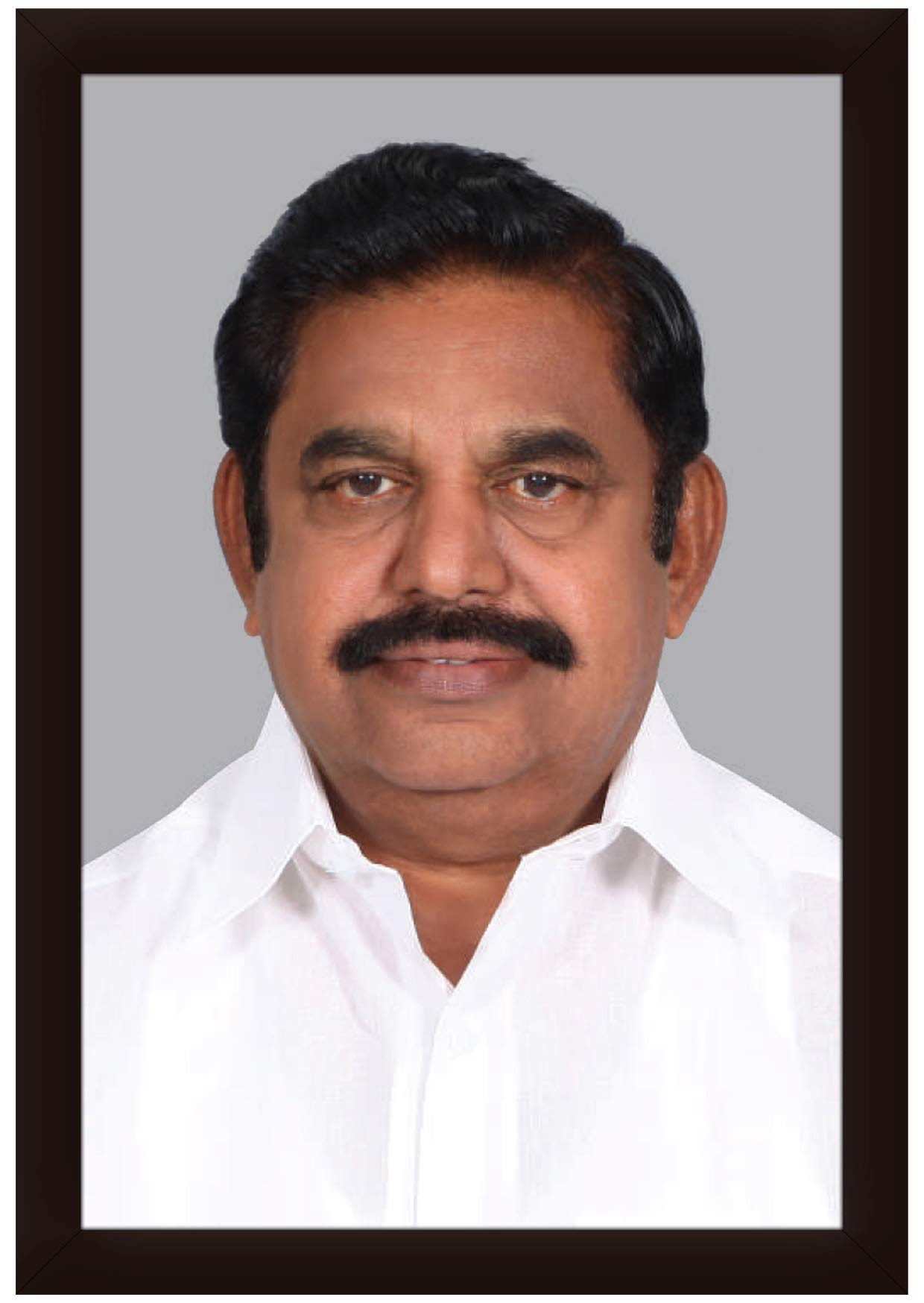
- Incumbent Edappadi K. Palaniswami; Former Chief Minister of Tamil Nadu
- Party: AIADMK
- Alliance: NDA
- Elected year: 2026

Edapadi or 'Edappadi' is a state assembly constituency in Salem district, Tamil Nadu, India. Its State Assembly Constituency number is 86. It comprises Edappadi taluk and a portion of Mettur taluk. It is a part of the wider Salem Lok Sabha constituency for national elections to the Parliament of India. This constituency did not exist during the 1957 and 1962 elections. It is one of the 234 State Legislative Assembly Constituencies in Tamil Nadu.

== Members of Legislative Assembly ==
Year	Member	Political party
Madras State
1952	S. Arthanareeswara Gounder	Indian National Congress
1967	A. Arumugam	Dravida Munnetra Kazhagam
Tamil Nadu
1971	A. Arumugam	Dravida Munnetra Kazhagam
1977	I. Ganesan	All India Anna Dravida Munnetra Kazhagam
1980	I. Ganesan	All India Anna Dravida Munnetra Kazhagam
1984	Govindaswamy	Indian National Congress
1989	Edappadi K. Palaniswami	All India Anna Dravida Munnetra Kazhagam
1991	Edappadi K. Palaniswami	All India Anna Dravida Munnetra Kazhagam
1996	I. Ganesan	Pattali Makkal Katchi
2001	I. Ganesan	Pattali Makkal Katchi
2006	V. Kaveri	Pattali Makkal Katchi
2011	Edappadi K. Palaniswami	All India Anna Dravida Munnetra Kazhagam
2016	Edappadi K. Palaniswami	All India Anna Dravida Munnetra Kazhagam
2021	Edappadi K. Palaniswami	All India Anna Dravida Munnetra Kazhagam
2026	Edappadi K. Palaniswami	All India Anna Dravida Munnetra Kazhagam

== Election results ==
Vote share of winning candidates
2026	57.67%
2021	66.27%
2016	43.74%
2011	56.38%
2006	44.76%
2001	55.40%
1996	37.68%
1991	58.24%
1989	33.08%
1984	64.78%
1980	38.93%
1977	38.56%
1971	54.72%
1967	54.70%
1952	33.15%

=== 2026 ===
2026 Tamil Nadu Legislative Assembly election: Edappadi
Party	Candidate	Votes	%	±%
AIADMK	Edappadi K. Palaniswami	148,933	57.67	▼8.60
Independent	K. Premkumar	50,823	19.68	New
DMK	C. Kasi	44,011	17.04	▼11.13
NTK	A. Priyadharshini	8,450	3.27	▲0.58
TVK	V. Govindaraj	1,662	0.64	New
NOTA	None of the above	1,341	0.52	
Margin of victory		98,110	37.99	▼0.11
Turnout		2,58,263	93.41	▲7.09
Registered electors		2,76,472		
AIADMK hold		Swing	▼8.60	

=== 2021 ===
2021 Tamil Nadu Legislative Assembly election: Edappadi
Party	Candidate	Votes	%	±%
AIADMK	Edappadi K. Palaniswami	163,154	66.27	+22.53
DMK	T. Sambathkumar	69,352	28.17	+3.73
NTK	Shri Rathna	6,626	2.69	+2.26
MNM	D. Thasapparaj	1,547	0.63	New
Margin of victory		93,802	38.10	19.48
Turnout		246,192	86.32	−0.03
AIADMK hold		Swing	22.53	

=== 2016 ===
2016 Tamil Nadu Legislative Assembly election: Edappadi
Party	Candidate	Votes	%	±%
AIADMK	Edappadi K. Palaniswami	98,703	43.74	−12.64
PMK	N. Annadurai	56,681	25.12	−12.54
DMK	P. A. Murugesan	55,149	24.44	New
CPI(M)	P. Thangavel	5,437	2.41	New
NOTA	NOTA	1,913	0.85	New
NCP	K. Palanisamy	1,789	0.79	New
Margin of victory		42,022	18.62	−0.10
Turnout		225,644	86.35	0.90
AIADMK hold		Swing	-12.64	

=== 2011 ===
2011 Tamil Nadu Legislative Assembly election: Edappadi
Party	Candidate	Votes	%	±%
AIADMK	Edappadi K. Palaniswami	104,586	56.38	+15.36
PMK	M. Karthi	69,848	37.66	−7.11
IJK	M. Venkatesan	3,638	1.96	New
Independent	N. R. Purusothaman	1,924	1.04	New
BJP	B. Thangaraj	1,901	1.02	+0.12
Independent	M. Muthuraj	1,899	1.02	New
Margin of victory		34,738	18.73	+14.99
Turnout		185,494	85.45	9.17
AIADMK gain from PMK		Swing	11.62	

=== 2006 ===
2006 Tamil Nadu Legislative Assembly election: Edappadi
Party	Candidate	Votes	%	±%
PMK	V. Kaveri	76,027	44.76%	−10.64
AIADMK	Edappadi K. Palaniswami	69,680	41.02%	New
DMDK	A. K. Rajendran	7,954	4.68%	New
Independent	I. Ganesan	6,881	4.05%	New
Independent	R. Ravi	2,197	1.29%	New
BJP	S. Thillaikkarasi Ponnusamy	1,545	0.91%	New
JD(U)	N. Murugesan	1,540	0.91%	New
Independent	V. Selvaraju	1,432	0.84%	New
Margin of victory		6,347	3.74%	−19.21%
Turnout		169,848	76.28%	14.25%
Registered electors		222,666		
PMK hold		Swing	-10.64%	

=== 2001 ===
2001 Tamil Nadu Legislative Assembly election: Edappadi
Party	Candidate	Votes	%	±%
PMK	I. Ganesan	74,375	55.40%	+17.73
DMK	A. Kandasamy	43,564	32.45%	+1.78
Independent	P. Kolanda Gounder	8,576	6.39%	New
MDMK	S. Rathinasabapathi	3,091	2.30%	+1.01
Independent	A. Devaraj	2,645	1.97%	New
BSP	V. K. Krishnan	1,308	0.97%	New
Independent	K. Kannan	684	0.51%	New
Margin of victory		30,811	22.95%	15.95%
Turnout		134,243	62.03%	−7.05%
Registered electors		216,474		
PMK hold		Swing	17.73%	

=== 1996 ===
1996 Tamil Nadu Legislative Assembly election: Edappadi
Party	Candidate	Votes	%	±%
PMK	I. Ganesan	49,465	37.68%	New
DMK	P. A. Murugesan	40,273	30.68%	+14.57
AIADMK	Edappadi K. Palaniswami	37,036	28.21%	−30.03
MDMK	G. Anbumathi Selvan	1,702	1.30%	New
Margin of victory		9,192	7.00%	−26.20%
Turnout		131,287	69.08%	3.55%
Registered electors		201,142		
PMK gain from AIADMK		Swing	-20.56%	

=== 1991 ===
1991 Tamil Nadu Legislative Assembly election: Edappadi
Party	Candidate	Votes	%	±%
AIADMK	Edappadi K. Palaniswami	72,379	58.24%	+25.16
PMK	P. Kolandai	31,113	25.03%	New
DMK	A. Kandasamy	20,011	16.10%	−15.51
Margin of victory		41,266	33.20%	31.74%
Turnout		124,281	65.54%	12.32%
Registered electors		195,456		
AIADMK hold		Swing	25.16%	

=== 1989 ===
1989 Tamil Nadu Legislative Assembly election: Edappadi
Party	Candidate	Votes	%	±%
AIADMK	Edappadi K. Palaniswami	30,765	33.08%	New
DMK	L. Palanisamy	29,401	31.62%	+5.3
INC	S. Govindasami	16,289	17.52%	−47.26
AIADMK	I. Ganesan	15,181	16.32%	New
Independent	K. Palanisamy	649	0.70%	New
Margin of victory		1,364	1.47%	−37.00%
Turnout		92,993	53.21%	−19.04%
Registered electors		178,702		
AIADMK gain from INC		Swing	-31.70%	

=== 1984 ===
1984 Tamil Nadu Legislative Assembly election: Edappadi
Party	Candidate	Votes	%	±%
INC	Govindaswamy	68,583	64.78%	+46.45
DMK	P. Arumugam	27,860	26.32%	New
Independent	T. Vaithigounder	6,557	6.19%	New
Independent	K. Raju	2,871	2.71%	New
Margin of victory		40,723	38.46%	32.50%
Turnout		105,871	72.26%	3.24%
Registered electors		156,478		
INC gain from AIADMK		Swing	25.85%	

=== 1980 ===
1980 Tamil Nadu Legislative Assembly election: Edappadi
Party	Candidate	Votes	%	±%
AIADMK	I. Ganesan	37,978	38.93%	+0.37
Independent	T. Natarajan	32,159	32.97%	New
INC	K. S. Subramania Gounder	17,884	18.33%	−11.78
Independent	R. Arthanari	4,544	4.66%	New
JP	P. Jayadertan	4,112	4.22%	New
Margin of victory		5,819	5.96%	−2.48%
Turnout		97,554	69.02%	8.45%
Registered electors		143,256		
AIADMK hold		Swing	0.37%	

=== 1977 ===
1977 Tamil Nadu Legislative Assembly election: Edappadi
Party	Candidate	Votes	%	±%
AIADMK	I. Ganesan	31,063	38.56%	New
INC	T. Natarajan	24,256	30.11%	−15.17
JP	P. Jayadevan	13,544	16.81%	New
DMK	A. Arumugam	11,695	14.52%	−40.21
Margin of victory		6,807	8.45%	−1.00%
Turnout		80,558	60.57%	−1.62%
Registered electors		134,924		
AIADMK gain from DMK		Swing	-16.16%	

=== 1971 ===
1971 Tamil Nadu Legislative Assembly election: Edappadi
Party	Candidate	Votes	%	±%
DMK	A. Arumugam	35,638	54.72%	+0.03
INC	T. Natarajan	29,485	45.28%	−0.03
Margin of victory		6,153	9.45%	0.06%
Turnout		65,123	62.19%	−9.28%
Registered electors		108,906		
DMK hold		Swing	0.03%	

=== 1967 ===
1967 Madras Legislative Assembly election: Edappadi
Party	Candidate	Votes	%	±%
DMK	A. Arumugam	36,935	54.70%	New
INC	K. S. S. Gounder	30,593	45.30%	New
Margin of victory		6,342	9.39%	
Turnout		67,528	71.47%	
Registered electors		97,701		
DMK win (new seat)				

=== 1952 ===
1952 Madras Legislative Assembly election: Edappadi
Party	Candidate	Votes	%	±%
INC	K. S. Ardhanareeswara Gounder	15,368	33.15%	New
TTP	S. Marimuthu Gounder	11,280	24.33%	New
Socialist Party (India)	S. Surendran	7,899	17.04%	New
Independent	S. Chinmandi Bakkir	6,153	13.27%	New
Independent	A. Karuppa Chetti Gounder	3,218	6.94%	New
Independent	R. Nallathamby	2,440	5.26%	New
Margin of victory		4,088	8.82%	
Turnout		46,358	50.15%	
Registered electors		92,437		
INC win (new seat)				
