= A. Arumugam =

Indian politician

Member of the Madras State Assembly
- In office 1967 - 1972; 1971 - 1976
- Constituency: Edappadi

Personal details
- Political party: Dravida Munnetra Kazhagam

A. Arumugam was an Indian politician and former Member of the Legislative Assembly of Tamil Nadu. He was elected to the Tamil Nadu legislative assembly as a Dravida Munnetra Kazhagam candidate from Edapadi constituency in 1967, and 1971 elections.

The only candidate from DMK - Dravida munnetra kazhagam who won Member of legislative assembly (MLA) from Edapadi till now ( 2019)
