= Disproportionate assets case against J. Jayalalithaa =

Indian political scandal in 1991–96

Disproportionate assets case of J. Jayalalithaa
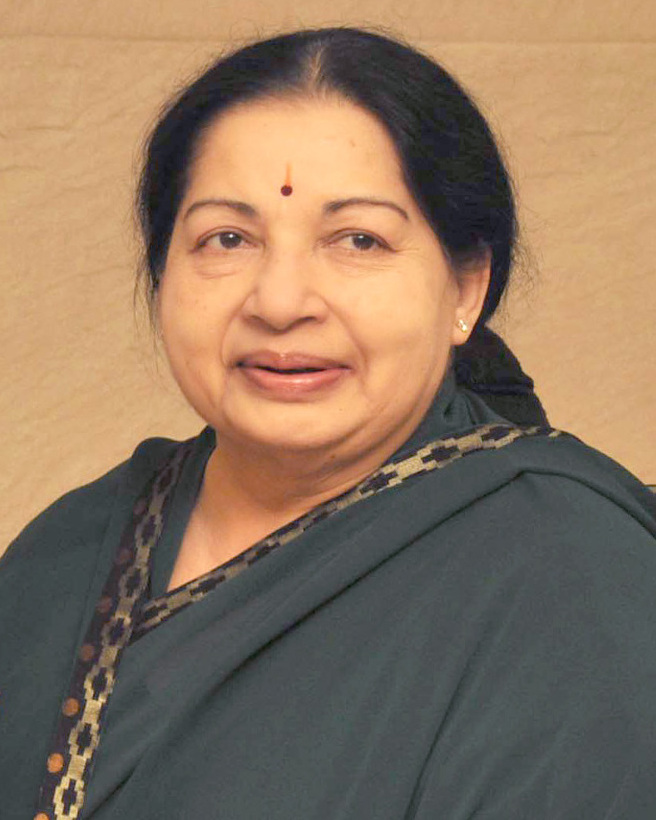
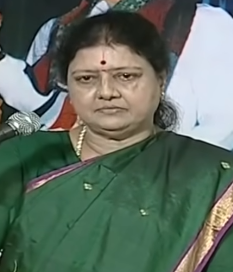
- J. Jayalalithaa & her close associate V. K. Sasikala
- Date: 14 June 1996; 30 years ago
- Location: Chennai
- Also known as: DA Case
- Participants: J. Jayalalithaa, Sasikala, Ilavarasi, V. N. Sudhakaran, DR Subramanian Swamy (chief petitioner)
- Outcome: Imprisonment and fine
- Charges: Misuse of office, Disproportionate assets, Criminal conspiracy, Corruption
- Verdict: Supreme Court: Trial court verdict restored. High Court: Acquitted of all charges, bail bonds discharged. Trial Court: 4 years' simple imprisonment for all four, a fine of ₹100 crore for Jayalalithaa and ₹10 crores for the other three
- Convictions: Supreme Court: 3; High Court: none; Trial Court: 4.
- Litigation: 18 years

J. Jayalalithaa (24 February 1948 – 5 December 2016) was an Indian politician who was the six-time Chief Minister of the Indian state of Tamil Nadu. She was initially convicted for misusing her office during her tenure of 1991–96. Subramanian Swamy was the chief petitioner. Some of the allegations involved spending on her foster son's lavish marriage in 1996 and her acquisition of properties worth more than ₹66.65 crore (equivalent to ₹398 crore or US$41 million in 2026), as well as jewellery, cash deposits, investments and a fleet of luxury cars. This was the first case in India where a ruling chief minister had to step down on account of a court sentence. Ultimately, in May 2015, her conviction was overturned, she was acquitted of all charges. She died before the Supreme Court of India reviewed the case in 2017.

The trial lasted 18 years and was transferred to Bengaluru from Chennai. A judgement on 27 September 2014 in the Special Court headed by Justice John Michael D'Cunha convicted all of the accused—namely J. Jayalalithaa, VK Sasikala, Ilavarasi and V. N. Sudhakaran—and sentenced them to four years' simple imprisonment. Jayalalithaa was fined ₹100 crore (equivalent to ₹174 crore or US$18 million in 2026) and the other three were fined ₹10 crore (equivalent to ₹17 crore or US$1.8 million in 2026) each. She was convicted for the third time and was forced to step down from the Chief Minister's office for a second time. She was also the seventh politician and the first Member of the Legislative Assembly (MLA) from the state, and the third nationally, to be disqualified after the Supreme Court judgement in 2014 on the Representation of the People Act that prevents convicted politicians from holding office.

In May 2015, the Karnataka High Court's C. R. Kumaraswamy overturned the trial court's verdict, acquitting those accused of all charges. This paved the way for Jayalalithaa's return to power as Chief Minister of Tamil Nadu on 23 May 2015.

On 14 February 2017, the Supreme Court of India's Binaki Chandra Bose, Amitva Ray over-ruled the Karnataka High Court. Sasikala and the other accused were convicted and sentenced to four years' imprisonment, as well as being fined ₹10 crore (equivalent to ₹15 crore or US$1.6 million in 2026) each. The case against Jayalalithaa was abated because she had died but fines were levied on her properties.

== Case ==
Movable Properties in Disproportionate Assets
| Particulars | Numbers |
|---|---|
| Sarees | 11,344 |
| Decorated footwears | 750 |
| Shawls | 250 |
| Dressing tables | 9 |
| Wrist watches | 91 |
| Suitcases | 131 |
| Teapoys | 34 |
| Tables | 31 |
| Cots | 24 |
| Sofa Sets | 20 |
| Dressing Mirrors | 31 |
| Telephones/Intercoms | 33 |
| Wall Clocks | 27 |
| Fans | 86 |
| Decorated Chairs | 146 |
| Hanging Lights | 81 |
| Crystal Cut Glasses | 215 |
| Refrigerators | 12 |
| Television Sets | 10 |
| VCRs | 8 |
| Video Camera | 1 |
| CD Players | 4 |
| Audio Decks | 2 |
| Two-in-One Tape Recorders | 24 |
| Video Cassettes | 1,040 |
| Cash | 1,93,202 |

Jayalalithaa was a six-time chief minister of the South Indian state of Tamil Nadu. She was accused of misusing her office during her first tenure as chief minister during 1991–96 to amass properties worth ₹66.65 crore (equivalent to ₹398 crore or US$41 million in 2026) and depositing the amount in her proxy accounts. The assets under the purview of the case span over 1,200 ha (3,000 acres) including the farm houses and bungalows in Chennai, agricultural land in Tamil Nadu, a farm house in Hyderabad, a tea estate in the Nilgiris, valuable jewellery, industrial sheds, cash deposits and investments in banks and a set of luxury cars. A raid in her Poes garden residence in 1997 recovered 800 kg (1,800 lb) silver, 28 kg (62 lb) gold, 750 pairs of shoes, 10,500 sarees, 91 watches and other valuables. The valuables were kept in a vault in Reserve Bank of India in Chennai. The opposition party petitioned the court to take control of those assets but a judge who inspected them in January 2014 ordered their transfer to Bangalore. The judgement on 27 September 2014 in the Special Court found all four parties guilty. The case had political implications as it was the first case where a ruling Chief minister had to step down on account of a court verdict.

Later, on 11 May 2015, Jayalalithaa was acquitted of all the charges by High Court of Karnataka by C. R. Kumaraswamy.

Later, on 15 February 2017, The Supreme court overheard the case and convicted all by Pinaki Chandra Bose and Amitava Roy. The order of the special court was restored by the apex court. This ended VK Sasikala's dream to be Chief Minister.

== Trial ==
The Dravida Munnetra Kazhagam (DMK) government lost power to the Jayalalithaa-led AIADMK government in 2001. In 2003, DMK requested that the court proceedings take place outside Tamil Nadu because it doubted that a fair trial would happen under her governance. The case was transferred to the neighbouring state of Karnataka. During May 2010, Jayalalithaa's counsel argued that those in charge of the proceedings were not competent to run the case. The Supreme Court dismissed the appeal.

In 2002, several prosecution witnesses resiled from their earlier depositions when Jayalalithaa was acquitted by Madras High Court. Bangalore Special Court noted that "No attempt has been made to elicit or find out whether witnesses were resiling because they are now under pressure to do so. It does appear that the new public prosecutor is hand in glove with the accused, thereby causing a reasonable apprehension of likelihood of failure of justice in the minds of the public at large. There is a strong indication that the process of justice is being subverted."

Despite attempting to avoid appearing personally before the court, citing security concerns, the Supreme Court ordered Jayalalithaa to do so. Her deposition lasted two days in October 2011.

In 2012, Karnataka Advocate General B.V.Acharya, who had spent seven years building the case, resigned as the Special Public Prosecutor. He told reporters that he was being pressured by the state government and "forces" who wanted him off the case.

During June 2014, the Supreme Court ordered resumption of trial and dismissed the plea from Jayalalithaa seeking to abate the case.

On 27 September 2014, the Special Court headed by Justice John Michael D'Cunha convicted all four accused. Jayalalithaa was sentenced to four years simple imprisonment under the Prevention of Corruption Act and fined ₹100 crores, which would be set-off against the confiscated properties. The three co-accused were all sentenced to four years simple imprisonment and fined ₹10 crores each. Failure to pay the fine would result in an additional year of sentence. The outcome also meant that Jayalalithaa was disqualified as an MLA and as Chief Minister, and that she would not be able to contest elections for 10 years.

The Trial Court Verdict

"I hold that all the assets and pecuniary resources found in the possession of” Sasikala, Sudhakaran and Ilavarasi and “in the name of various firms and companies” owned by the four accused “actually belong to” Jayalalithaa. The prosecution could show that there was no real source of income with Sasikala, Sudhakaran and Ilavarasi and that the public servant (Jayalalithaa) is the real source"

— ~ Justice John Michael D'Cunha, Jaya convicted, 27 Sep 2014

Following the judgment, Jayalalithaa was moved to Parappana Agrahara prison. Requests for a VVIP cell and medical treatment were denied. The three co-accused were also jailed at that prison. The four sought bail pending an appeal and this was granted on 17 October 2014. It was stipulated that the appeal must be completed within three months. On 17 October 2014, Supreme Court granted two months bail and suspended her sentence. On 18 December 2014, the same court extended her bail by four months and ordered that her appeal challenging conviction in Karnataka High Court be conducted on day-to-day basis by a Special Bench.

The case went to appeal in Karnataka High Court. Judgement was delayed because Anbazhagan petitioned the Supreme Court against the appointment of Bhavani Singh as prosecutor. He was accused of aiding the defendants. The Supreme Court accepted the appeal and ruled that appointment of Bhavani was against rules. It also instructed the High Court to get written statements from the newly appointed prosecutor of the case by Karnataka government. The Karnataka government appointed B. V. Acharya.

On 11 May 2015, Jayalalithaa was acquitted of all charges by the Karnataka High Court, causing wild celebrations by supporters.

On 15 February 2017, The Supreme court overheard the case and convicted all. The order of the special court was restored by the apex court.

Karnataka has sent a bill of Rs 12.04 crore to Tamil Nadu in connection with this case. The bill details the expenditure incurred by Karnataka while conducting the DA case between 2004 and 2016. The bill has details of the court charges, security, fees of lawyers, salary of judges and also the security arrangements made in connection with the case. The expenses were incurred by the chief accountant, the registrars of the city civil court and the Karnataka high court and the home department.

== Aftermath ==
=== 2014 ===
Announcement of the judgement and sentence was delayed by six hours, leading to chaos outside the court. Soon after, sporadic incidents of violence were reported across the state initiated by the AIADMK and Jayalalithaa loyalists. Most shops, restaurants, malls and movie halls remained closed and public transport was totally stopped. The neighbouring state of Karnataka and Kerala stopped inter-state buses to Tamil Nadu. A state-owned bus was set ablaze near Kanchipuram before passengers were made to alight. The governor of Tamil Nadu, Konijeti Rosaiah ordered operations to maintain law and order and, while the police said that the situation was under control, opposition parties complained of violence. The leader of DMK, M. Karunanidhi, wrote to the President of India and the Prime Minister seeking restoration of peace. The Central Home Ministry offered support to control violence. Venkatesan, a 65-year-old fan of Jayalilathaa, immolated himself in Chennai as a mark of protest and died later in hospital. Another follower tried self-immolation in front of the house of Jayalalithaa at Poes Gardens but was stopped by the police.

Following the disqualification of Jayalalithaa as Chief Minister, media reported various front-runners for the post. The AIADMK eventually opted for O. Panneerselvam to become Chief Minister.

=== 2017 ===
Sasikala then convened the party's MLA council in her capacity as the general secretary, where Edappadi K. Palaniswami was unanimously appointed as the new chief minister and sworn in the next day. The Kodanad tea estate, associated with the assets of Jayalalithaa and Sasikala, was later the site of the robbery and murder in 2017.

== Political consequences ==
=== 2014 ===
Jayalalithaa became the first Chief Minister to lose her post due to being convicted while in office and the seventh MLA to lose office for that reason. She was convicted for the third time overall and was forced to step down from the Chief Minister's office for the second time. Jayalalithaa was the sixth former chief minister of an Indian state to have been charged and jailed in a corruption case.

=== 2017 ===
It effectively ending Sasikala's chief ministerial ambitions and she banned for contesting elections for 10 years till 2027. She was released in January 2021.

== Timeline ==
- June 1996 – Subramanian Swamy files complaint against Jayalalithaa against the amassed wealth. The DMK-led government registered a First Information Report against her and an investigation into the complaint begins
- June 1997 – Jayalalithaa, Sasikala, Ilavarasi and Sudhakaran are formally charged and this is confirmed by special court in October
- May 2001 – Jayalalithaa-led AIADMK comes back to power in Tamil Nadu
- February 2003 – K. Anbazhagan, the secretary of DMK, files an appeal in the Supreme Court to transfer proceedings outside Tamil Nadu to ensure a fair trial. In November that year, the Court orders that the trial be moved to Bangalore, Karnataka
- March 2005 – Trial commences in special court in Bangalore
- December 2010 to February 2011 – Re-examination of witnesses by prosecution
- 20, 21 October and 22, 23 November 2011 – Jayalalithaa appears in person in court and answers questions
- August 2012 – Special Public Prosecutor (SPP) B. V. Acharya resigns quoting efforts transferring him
- 2013 – G. Bhawani Singh appointed as the SPP in February, removed by the Government of Karnataka in August and then reinstated by the Supreme Court in September
- 28 August 2014 – Trial concludes and court decides 20 September as the date of sentence
- 16 September 2014 – Court allows appeal of Jayalalithaa to move proceedings to different court and sentence to 27 September on grounds of security.
- 27 September 2014 – Court pronounces verdict – all four convicted are sentenced. The four defendants were sent to the Parappana Agrahara Central Jail in Bengaluru.
- 29 September 2014 – Jayalalithaa files a bail plea in Karnataka High Court. The plea was rejected two days later, but on 17 October 2014 it was granted by the Supreme Court.
- 18 October 2014 – Jayalalithaa returns to chennai, after 21 days in Bangalore prison.
- 27 April 2015 – Supreme Court holds appointment of Bhawani Singh as prosecutor in appeal as wrong in law but does not allow a fresh hearing.
- 11 May 2015 – Jayalalithaa is acquitted of all corruption charges by the Karnataka High Court.
- 23 May 2015 – Jayalalithaa returns to power as Chief Minister of Tamil Nadu.
- 5 December 2016 – Jayalalithaa died on 5 December after suffering from a cardiac arrest.
- 14 February 2017 – Sasikala and other co-accused found guilty of corruption charges. Proceedings against Jayalalithaa were abated and dismissed on account of her death.
- 5 April 2017 – The Supreme Court of India rejected the review petition of Government of Karnataka to re-examine its decision to abate the proceedings against Jayalalithaa due to her death.
- 28 September 2018 – The Supreme Court of India dismissed the curative petition of Karnataka Government to re-examine its decision to abate the proceedings against Jayalalithaa due to her death.
