= V. Kaveri =

Indian politician

V. Kaveri was elected to the Tamil Nadu Legislative Assembly from the Edappadi constituency in the 2006 election. He was a candidate of the Pattali Makkal Katchi (PMK) party.
