= Kodanad estate robbery and murder =

Crime at Nilgiris, Tamil Nadu, India, in 2017

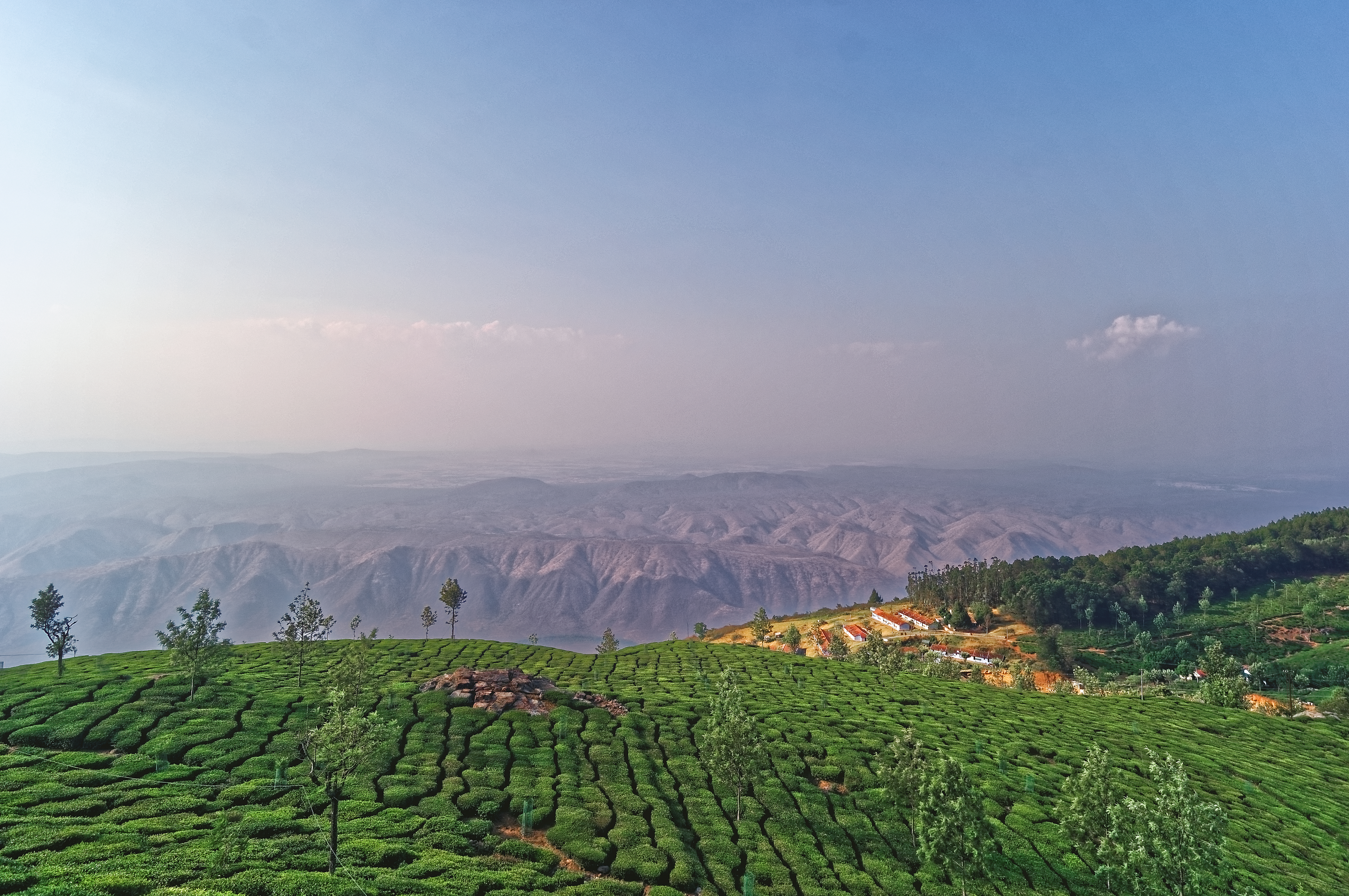
Kodanad estate

Kodanad estate is a tea estate in the Nilgiris district of Tamil Nadu. This estate is located in Kodanad, about 12 km from Kotagiri in the Nilgiris district. The estate is located near the tourist destination of Kodanad view point.

A criminal incident that took place on 24 April 2017, at the Kodanad estate. The estate served as one of the residences of former Tamil Nadu Chief Minister J. Jayalalithaa. During the attempted burglary, a security guard was killed and another was injured. The case attracted widespread public and media attention due to the estate's association with Jayalalithaa and the alleged links of some suspects to members of her political party, the All India Anna Dravida Munnetra Kazhagam (AIADMK). Several individuals were arrested in connection with the crime, and investigations into the motive and possible political implications have continued in the years since.

== History ==
In 1991, around the time Jayalalithaa became the Chief Minister of Tamil Nadu for the first time, the Kodanad estate in the Nilgiris district came to be associated with her and her close aide V. K. Sasikala. The estate, known for its scenic surroundings and proximity to the Mayar (Mayaru) waterfall, had previously changed ownership several times since the British colonial period.

According to media reports, the property was purchased in 1992 from Craig Jones and his family for around ₹7 crore. Craig Jones later stated to the media and before the Arumugasamy Commission that the estate had been taken over from his family under disputed circumstances. The estate's ownership was recorded in the names of J. Jayalalithaa, V. K. Sasikala, Ilavarasi, and V. N. Sudhakaran as shareholders.

At the time of purchase, the estate reportedly covered about 906 acres. Subsequent acquisitions of adjoining properties expanded the estate to approximately 1,600 acres. The property includes a bungalow of around 5,000 square feet, a helipad, a boat dock, a tea factory, and battery-operated vehicles used for internal transportation.

Jayalalithaa stayed at the estate on several occasions for respite, and used the bungalow as a remote office when she was a Chief Minister. Following the purchase of the estate, restrictions were implemented in the Kodanad area. Eleven entrance gates were constructed and secured to limit public access. The original 500 square meter residence was renovated into a bungalow with 99 rooms. The bungalow was designed so as not to be visible from outside the property. Approximately 500 workers were employed on the estate.

== Disproportionate assets case against Jayalalithaa ==
The Supreme Court upheld the special court's verdict in the disproportionate assets case against former Chief Minister J. Jayalalithaa, V. K. Sasikala, J. Ilavarasi, and V. N. Sudhakaran, and directed the confiscation of properties including the Kodanad estate in the Nilgiris district. In 2025, the Supreme Court dismissed pleas seeking the return of these confiscated assets. A decision on transferring the estate to government ownership remained pending as of February 2025.

== Incident ==
Following the death of J. Jayalalithaa on 5 December 2016, V. K. Sasikala was imprisoned in February 2017 after being convicted in a disproportionate assets case. On 24 April 2017, a power outage occurred at the Kodanad estate, which had reportedly not experienced such interruptions previously. The estate management reportedly removed the surveillance cameras near the bungalow.

According to police reports, at around 12:30 a.m. on 24 April 2017, two groups of five individuals each allegedly arrived separately in a vehicle and parked it away from the bungalow entrance. One group, reportedly wearing face masks, is said to have tampered with gate number 10 and attacked security guard Om Bahadur, who was inside the security cabin. At the same time, the other group allegedly tampered with gate number 8, about 100 metres away from gate 10, and attacked another security guard, Krishna Bahadur, who was on duty.

The burglars allegedly smashed the window of the room used by Jayalalithaa and Sasikala, and stole four watches, a crystal rhinoceros, and documents reportedly related to properties worth several thousand crores of rupees. The suspects then allegedly escaped in a vehicle waiting outside. That night, security guard Om Bahadur was murdered, and another guard, Krishna Bahadur, was seriously injured during an alleged break-in and robbery attempt, which police stated was aimed at stealing documents and riches.

== Response and investigation ==
In connection with the incident, police investigated suspects including C. Kanagaraj and K. V. Sayan. Kanagaraj, a former driver for Jayalalithaa, died in a road accident in Attur, Salem district, on 29 April 2017. Sayan was involved in a separate road accident near Palakkad, Kerala, on 23 May 2017, in which his wife and daughter died; he survived with injuries and was subsequently arrested. In total, ten individuals were arrested in connection with the case, including Sayan, D. Deepu, V. Satheesan, M. Santosh Sami, Udaya Kumar, Jithin Joy, Jamsheer Ali, Manoj Sami, Valayar Manoj, and Jijin.

During the trial, arrested suspects Sayan and Valayar Manoj made statements in interviews, questioning the motives behind their actions and implying involvement of others. These statements were highlighted in a video released by Mathew Samuel, former managing editor of Tehelka magazine, in January 2019, which alleged involvement of then-Tamil Nadu Chief Minister Edappadi K. Palaniswami in the crimes. Palaniswami denied the allegations, describing them as baseless, and filed defamation suits against Samuel, Sayan, and Manoj, seeking damages.

== See also ==
- Burglary and Murder
- J. Jayalilathaa
- V. K. Sasikala
- All India Anna Dravida Munnetra Kazhagam (AIADMK)
- Disproportionate assets case against Jayalalithaa
