= B.V. Acharya =

Indian lawyer

Senior Advocate at Karnataka High Court
- Incumbent
- Assumed office 1989

Personal details
- Born: Udupi district

Belpu Vasudeva Acharya is senior advocate at Karnataka High court. He is son of Ramachandra Acharya, a Shivalli Madhva Brahmin and native of Udupi district. He has been advocate general of Karnataka government several times. He shot to prominence nationally in Disproportionate assets case against Jayalalithaa, where he pursued case as special public prosecutor and special counsel taking to its logical end in spite of hardship and threats. He was selected as one among top ten lawyers of India by Bar council of India in 2017.
