= Department of Highways and Minor Ports (Tamil Nadu) =

Government department of Tamil Nadu state, India

Agency overview
- Formed: 1996
- Jurisdiction: Tamil Nadu
- Headquarters: Chennai
- Minister responsible: Aadhav Arjuna, Minister for Highways and Minor Ports Department
- Agency executive: Pradeep Yadav IAS, Additional Chief Secretary to Government
- Parent agency: Government of Tamil Nadu
- Website: Highways and Minor Ports Department

The Department of Highways and Minor Ports is one of the departments of Government of Tamil Nadu.

== History ==
The Government of Tamil Nadu created the highways department in 1946 as sub-department to public works department. A separate highways department was formed in 1996.

== Objective and functions ==
The objective of the department is to formulate policies, regulations and programmes regarding road transport. The department is responsible for the improvement and maintenance of public roads, highways and bridges and to establish and improve small ports.

== Infrastructure ==
Road

Tamil Nadu has an extensive road network covering about 2.71 lakh km as of 2023 with a road density of 2,084.71 kilometres (1,295.38 mi) per 1000 km^{2} which is higher than the national average of 1,926.02 kilometres (1,196.77 mi) per 1000 km^{2}. The department operates through eleven wings with 120 divisions and maintains 73,187 kilometres (45,476 mi) of highways in the state. There are state highways of length 6,805 kilometres (4,228 mi) which connect district headquarters, important towns and national highways in the state.

Road length in TN
| Type | NH | SH | MDR | ODR | OR | Total |
|---|---|---|---|---|---|---|
| Length (km) | 6,805 | 12,291 | 12,034 | 42,057 | 197,542 | 271,000 |

Water

There is an intermediate sea port at Nagapattinam and sixteen other minor ports which are managed by the department.

== Sub-departments ==
The following undertakings function under the department:

- Tamil Nadu Highways Department (TNHD)
- Tamil Nadu Maritime Board (TNMB)
- Tamil Nadu Road Sector Project (TNRSP)
- Tamil Nadu Road Development Company (TNRDC)
- Tamil Nadu Road Infrastructure Development Corporation (TNRIDC)
- Poompuhar Shipping Corporation (PSC)

== Ministers ==
- Aadhav Arjuna (2026-Present)
- E. V. Velu (2021–2026)
- Edappadi. K. Palanisamy (2011–21)
- M. P. Saminathan (2006–11)

== See also ==
- Government of Tamil Nadu
- Tamil Nadu Government's Departments
- Ministry of Road Transport and Highways (India)
