= Poompuhar Shipping Corporation =

Poompuhar Shipping Corporation Limited

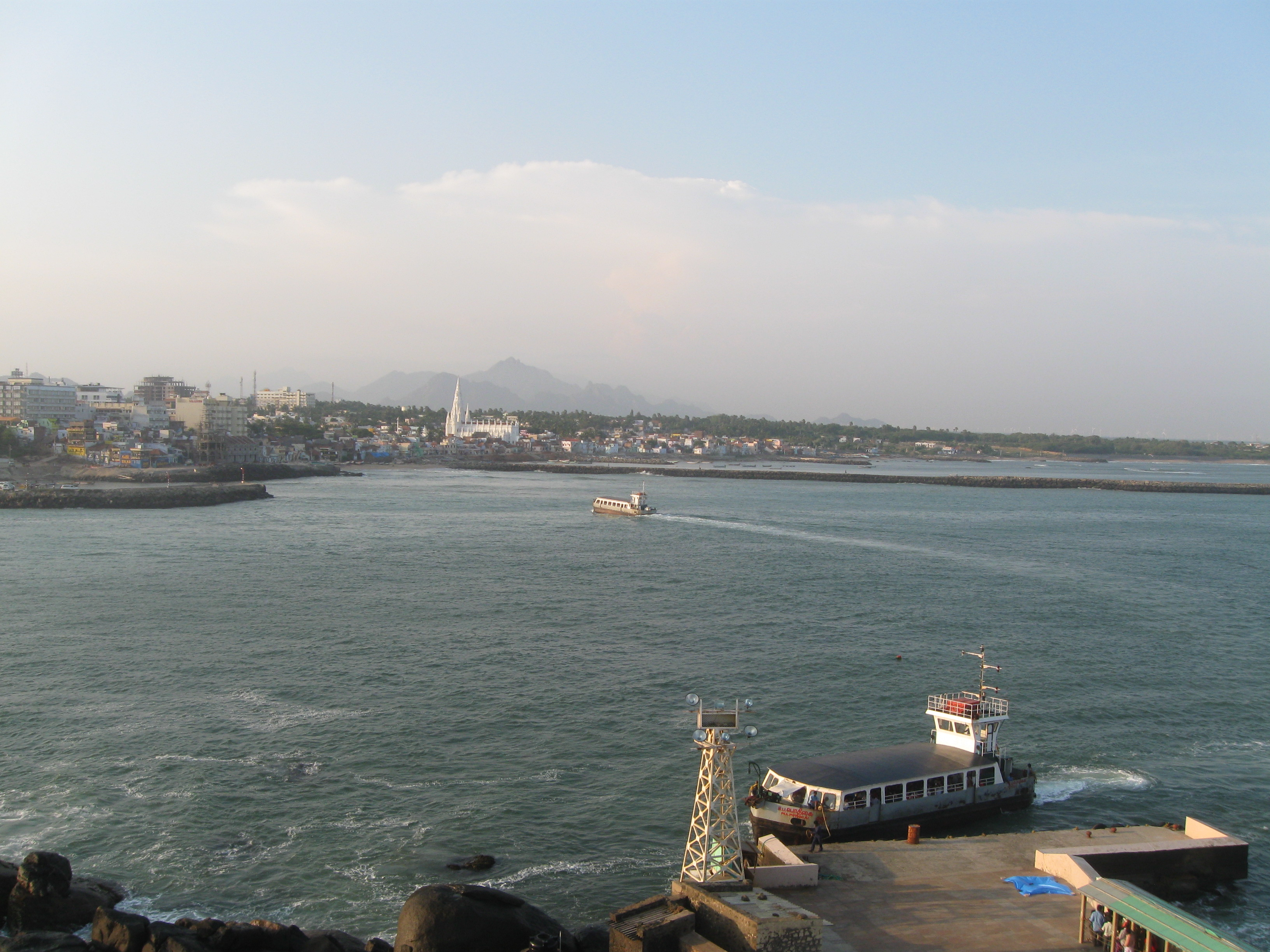
- The ferries belonging to Poompuhar Shipping Corporation carrying people between main land and Vivekananda Rock and Tiruvalluvar Statue
- Native name: பூம்புகார் கப்பல் போக்குவரத்துக் கழகம்
- Company type: Public Sector Corporation
- Industry: Public Ship Transport Service
- Founded: 11 April 1974; 52 years ago
- Headquarters: Chennai, Tamil Nadu, India
- Area served: Tamil Nadu
- Owner: Government of Tamil Nadu
- Parent: Department of Highways and Minor Ports (Tamil Nadu)
- Website: tamilship.com

Poompuhar Shipping Corporation Limited (Tamil: பூம்புகார் கப்பல் போக்குவரத்துக் கழகம்) is a state-government undertaking of Government of Tamil Nadu located in the Indian state of Tamil Nadu. This corporation runs ships to ferry the coal to the thermal power stations operated by Tamil Nadu Power Generation Corporation Limited and it also runs boats in tourist town of Kanyakumari.
