= I. Ganesan =

Indian politician

I. Ganesan is an Indian politician and former Member of the Legislative Assembly of Tamil Nadu. He was elected to the Tamil Nadu legislative assembly as an Anna Dravida Munnetra Kazhagam candidate from Edapadi constituency in 1977, and 1980 elections and as a Pattali Makkal Katchi candidate in 1996, and 2001 elections.
