= John Michael D'Cunha =

Indian special court judge (born 1959)

- Born: 7 April 1959 (age 67); Gurupura

John Michael D'Cunha is a retired Indian judge, who served as a judge of the Karnataka High Court.

D'Cunha was appointed an additional judge of the Karnataka High Court on 14 November 2016. On 27 September 2014 he convicted Jayalalithaa, then Chief Minister of Tamil Nadu, in her 18-year-old Disproportionate Asset case. He was appointed by the Supreme Court of India to the post in October 2013 as the fifth judge to investigate the case, replacing judge MS Balakrishna.

== Early life ==
D'Cunha was born in Gurpur, Kaikamba, 18 kilometres (11 mi) from Mangalore. He studied at SDM Law College in Mangalore, where he also played volleyball. D'Cunha started his law practice in 1985, and formed Manu Associates with fellow advocates Amruth Kini, M P Noronha and Ullal S K. The name "Manu" was formed from the first letter of each partner's name: ‘M’ for Michael, ‘A’ from Amruth, ‘N’ from Noronha and ‘U’ from Ullal. In 1999, he left Mangalore to join the Karnataka High Court.

== Judiciary ==
In 2002 D'Cunha joined the judiciary as a District Judge. He has served in the courts of Bangalore, Bellary, and Dharwad. He also served as secretary to the Chief Justice and Registrar (Vigilance) of the High Court. In June 2015, D'Cunha was appointed the registrar general of the Karnataka High Court. On 11th Nov 2016, D'Cunha was appointed a judge in the Karnataka High Court. He retired from the Karnataka High Court on 6 April 2021 upon superannuation.

=== Operation Kamala case ===
On 31 March 2021, the bench of Justice D'Cunha refused to quash the FIR against the sitting Chief Minister of Karnataka B. S. Yediyurappa in a case nicknamed Operation Kamala case. At the time of the alleged incident, Yediyurappa was the leader of opposition.

=== Disproportionate Asset case against Jayalalithaa ===
D'Cunha was appointed by the Supreme Court of India in October 2013 as the fifth judge to investigate the Disproportionate Asset case against Jayalalithaa, replacing judge MS Balakrishna. On 27 September 2014 D'Cunha convicted Jayalalithaa, the then Chief Minister of Tamil Nadu. In a detailed judgement, he showed that the entire asset belonged to the accused and no one else. She was sentenced to a prison term of four years and fined Rs. 100 crore. Jayalalithaa was later acquitted by the High Court of Karnataka on 11 May 2015. It claimed Trial court order by D'Cunha is not sustainable in law. The Supreme Court of India reconfirmed the D'Cunha punishment on 14 February 2017.

=== Flag hoisting at Idgah Maidan case against Uma Bharti ===
In the 1994 flag hoisting at Idgah Maidan case, pertaining to an open public ground located in the heart of Hubli, whose ownership was claimed by Anjuman-e-Islam, a minority educational institution, the Judicial Magistrate First Class of the 2nd Court, Hubli had from 2002 to 2004 issued 18 non-bailable arrest warrants against Uma Bharti then the Chief Minister of Madhya Pradesh, which Bharti had evaded. The Magistrate's court served a final arrest warrant on 3 August 2004.

Then Bharti, seeking to quash charges against her, approached the court of D'Cunha, then the District Judge of Hubli. D'Cunha rejected the petition because according to the statute of limitations, the case was too stale by 697 days. D'Cunha also rejected as defective a petition filed by Government of Karnataka that sought to reopen the case. He directed the government to cite 'proper grounds' for reopening the case and approach the Judicial Magistrate First Class 2nd Court.

Following this, Bharti resigned her position as Chief Minister of Madhya Pradesh and on 25 August 2004, surrendered to the court at Hubli, and was remanded into custody for 14 days.

The subsequent application to withdraw the case against Bharti and 21 other defendants was accepted on 6 September 2004 by Mohammed Ismail, Judicial Magistrate First Class 2nd Court. Bharti was then released.

In 2010, the Supreme Court ruled that the Idgah Maidan was the exclusive property of the Hubli-Dharwad Municipal Corporation (HDMC). The Supreme Court upheld the High Court order that Anjuman e-Islam (AeI) was only allowed to hold prayers in the grounds twice a year, the AeI was not allowed to build any permanent structures on the maidan and directed the HDMC to demolish the commercial complex built by AeI there.
