= Kodanad, Tamil Nadu =

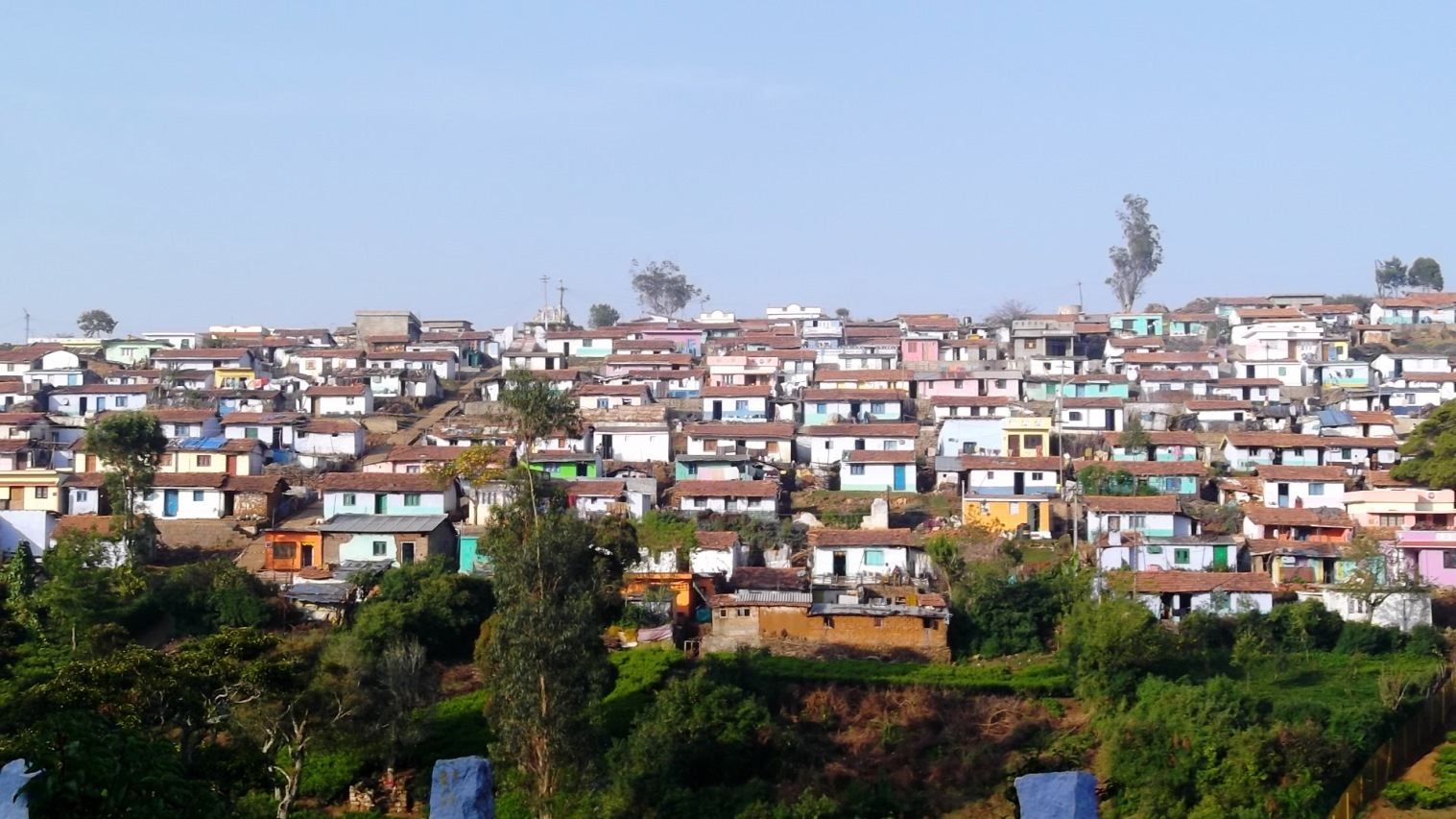
Image of Kodanad

Kodanad (கோடநாடு) is a panchayat located in the Kothagiri zone of Nilgiris district in Tamil Nadu state, India. The spoken language of this region is Tamil.

In April 2017, a robbery and murder occurred at the Kodanad Tea Estate, which was previously owned by former Tamil Nadu Chief Minister J. Jayalalithaa. The incident is covered in detail in the article Kodanad estate robbery and murder.

== Population ==
As per the census of 2011, the total population of the panchayat is 4385 in which 2184 were female and 2201 were male.

== Kodanad View point ==
It is located about 18 km east of Kotagiri on the eastern edges of Nilgiris at 11°31′29″N 76°54′57″E. Due to the location it is also called the Terminus Country.
