= List of areas of Vellore =

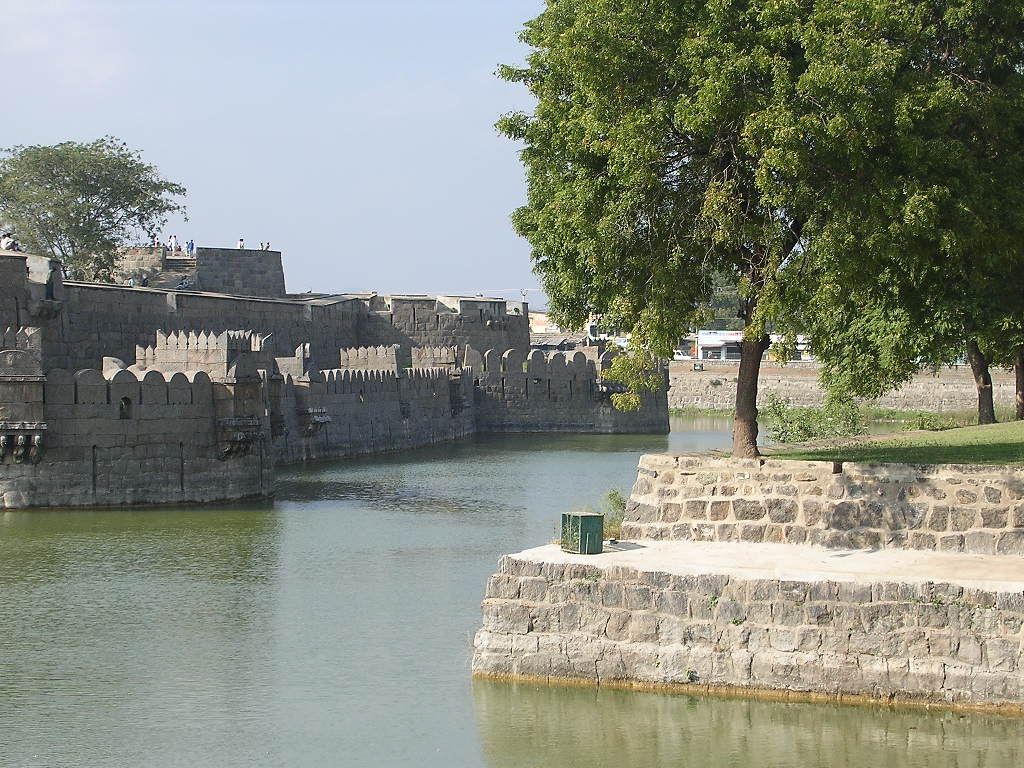
- Vellore Fort

- Location in Tamil Nadu, India
- Coordinates: 12.868719°N 79.119000°E
- Country: India
- State: Tamil Nadu
- District: Vellore district

Government
  - Mayor: (none)

Area
  - Total: 167.4 km^{2} (64.6 sq mi)
- Elevation: 216 m (709 ft)

Languages
  - Official: Tamil
- Time zone: UTC+5:30 (IST)
- PIN: 632 XXX
- Telephone code: 91- 416
- Vehicle registration: TN 23, TN 73
- Website: vellorecorp.tn.gov.in

This article provides you the list of major areas in and around the Indian city of Vellore, Tamil Nadu.

Areas within corporation limits as follows,

- Thottapalayam
- Gandhinagar
- Sathuvachari
- Thorapadi
- Konavattam
- Dharapadavedu
- Shenbaakkam
- Kamaraj Nagar
- Velpadi
- Kosapettai
- Perumugai
- Toll gate
- R N Palayam
- Kaspa
- Kagithapattrai
- Perumal Nagar
- Saidapet
- Katpadi
- Sainathapuram
- Sankaranpalayam
- Allapuram
- CMC-Vellore
- CMC-Ranipet
- Bagayam
- Hazrath Makkaan
- Kangeyanallur
- Vellore Fort
- Green circule
- New bus stand(Katpadi Road)
- Old bus stand(Arani Road)
- Pudur
- Airport Roundabout
- Vallalar
- Rangapuram
- A.M.Puram (Alamelumangapuram)
- Kazhinjur
- Melmonavoor
- Abdullapuram
- Ariyur
- saduperi
- sripuram
- Palavansathu
- Virupatchipuram
- otteri
- Chitteri
- Poigai
- Chittoor Bus stand
- Tiruvalam Town
- Sevoor
- Brahmapuram
- Muthukadai
- Bharathi Nagar
- SEZ-ELCOT
- Sipcot
- BHEL
- Villapaakam
- Thimiri
- SMH Hospital
- Walajah Road Junction
- Allikulam(Ammoor)

== Suburban Vellore ==
- Ranipet
- Melvisharam
- Arcot
- Ratnagiri
- Walajapet
- Gudiyatham
- Pallikonda
- K.V.Kuppam
- Arni
- Ambur
- Vaniyambadi
- Pernambut
- Tirupattur
- Sholinghur
- Arakkonam
- Ponnai
- Thiruvalam
