= Vellore Spiny brinjal =

Type of Brinjal variety from Tamil Nadu, India

- Geographical indication
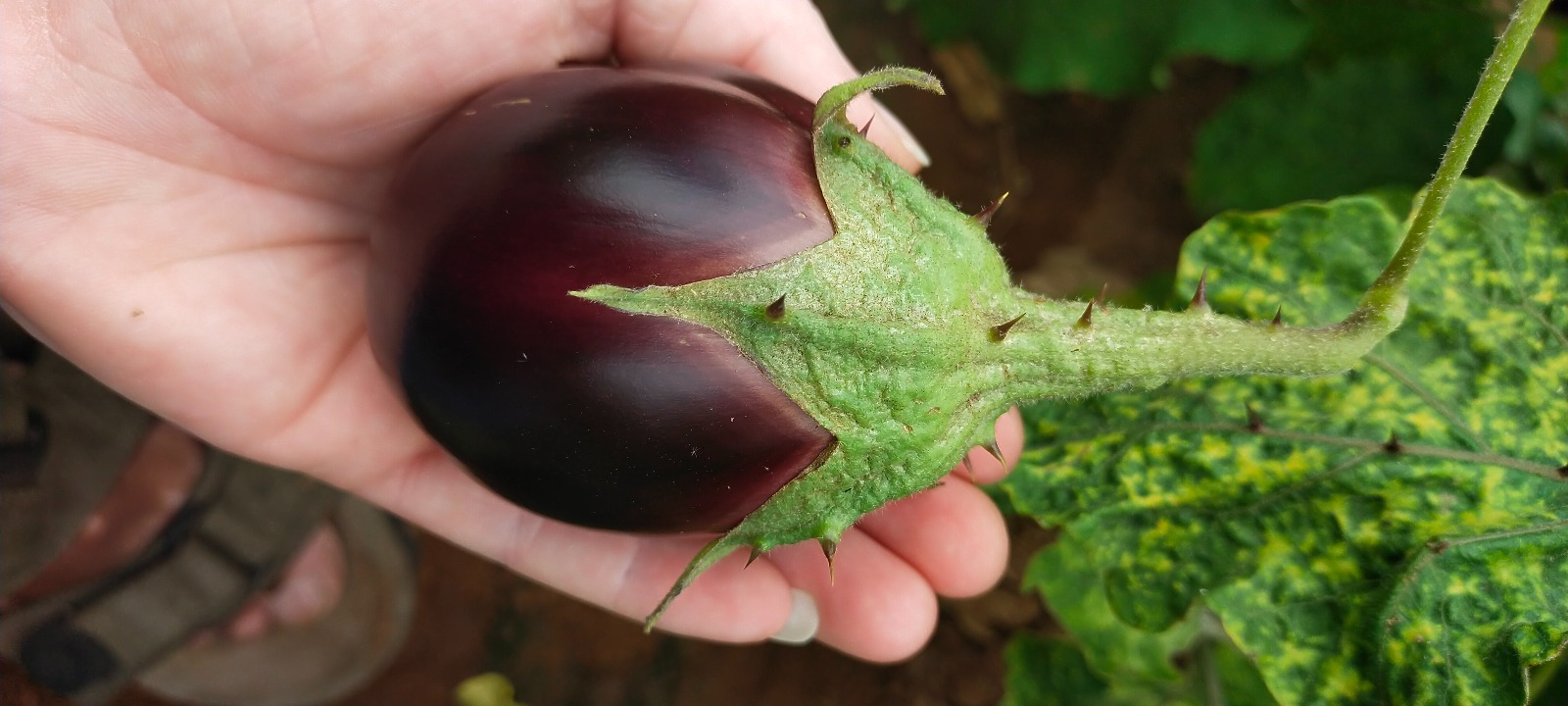
- Close-up of an unplucked Vellore Spiny Brinjal in a field in Elavambadi village
- Alternative names: Elavambadi Mullu Kathrikai
- Description: Brinjal variety cultivated in Tamil Nadu
- Type: Agricultural
- Area: Vellore
- Country: India
- Registered: 22 February 2023
- Official website: ipindia.gov.in

Vellore Spiny brinjal is a variety of brinjal grown in the Indian state of Tamil Nadu. It originated as a tropical vegetable crop from the village of Elavambadi located in Vellore district. It is primarily cultivated in the Vellore district, specifically in the areas of Anaicut, Kaniyambadi, Gudiyatham, K. V. Uppam, Vellore, Katpadi, and Pernambut. It was recognized as a unique Geographical Indication (GI) in February 2023 by the Government of India.

== Name ==
Vellore Spiny brinjal is a popular, native vegetable crop in Vellore and so named after it. The term "Spiny" is used as this brinjal variety is easily identifiable due to its distinctive thorns.

=== Local name ===
It is locally known as 'Elavambadi Mullu Kathrikai' (Tamil: எலவம்பாடி முள்ளு கத்திரிகை) in the local state language of Tamil. This name refers to the village of its origin, Elavambadi, and literally translates to "thorny brinjal" (Mullu: thorns, Kathrikai: brinjal).

== Description ==
Some points about Vellore Spiny brinjal:

=== Characteristics ===
- This variety has an oval shape with a glossy violet shade mixed with pink color, white stripes, and a green tinge. It has a soft and fleshy texture with few seeds, and an average weight of 40 grams.

=== Cultivation ===
- This variety is primarily grown in the Vellore district and is suitable for cultivation in three seasons: Kharif, Rabi, and summer. It is tolerant of drought and high temperatures.

=== Culinary Uses ===
BiryaniSambarPoriyal

=== Unique Features ===
- Thorns are present on all parts of the plant, except the actual brinjal crop. The thorns require skilled farmers for harvesting. Despite the thorny plant, the brinjal has a soft and fleshy texture.

== Photo Gallery ==
Actual photos provided by SIMCO, located at Vellore - the original applicants for the Geographical Indication Tag.

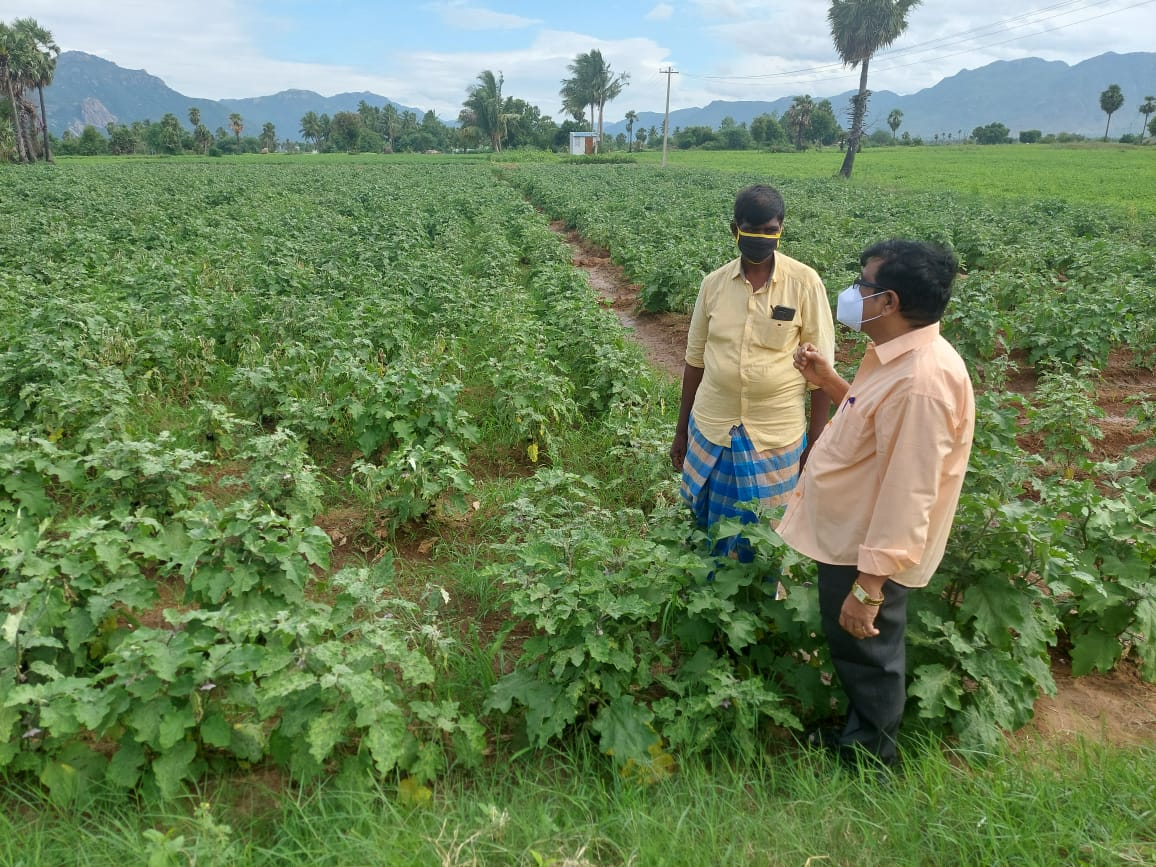
I P.Krishnan from SIMCO supervising Vellore Spiny Brinjal crops

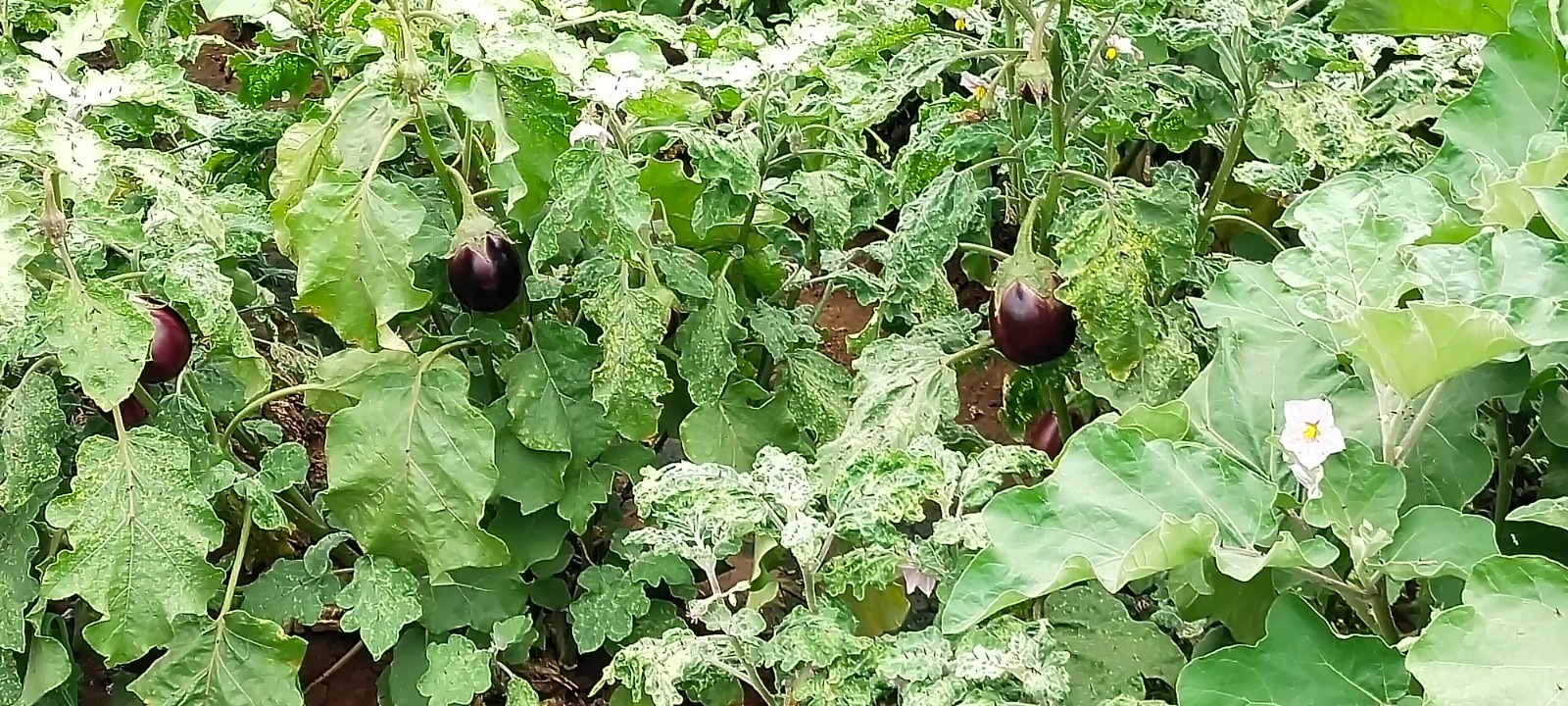
Vellore Spiny Brinjal crop in the field from Elavambadi village

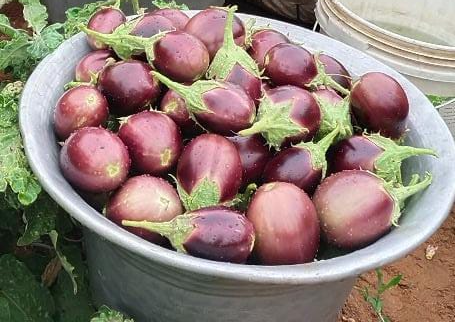
Closeup of freshly harvested Vellore Spiny Brinjal

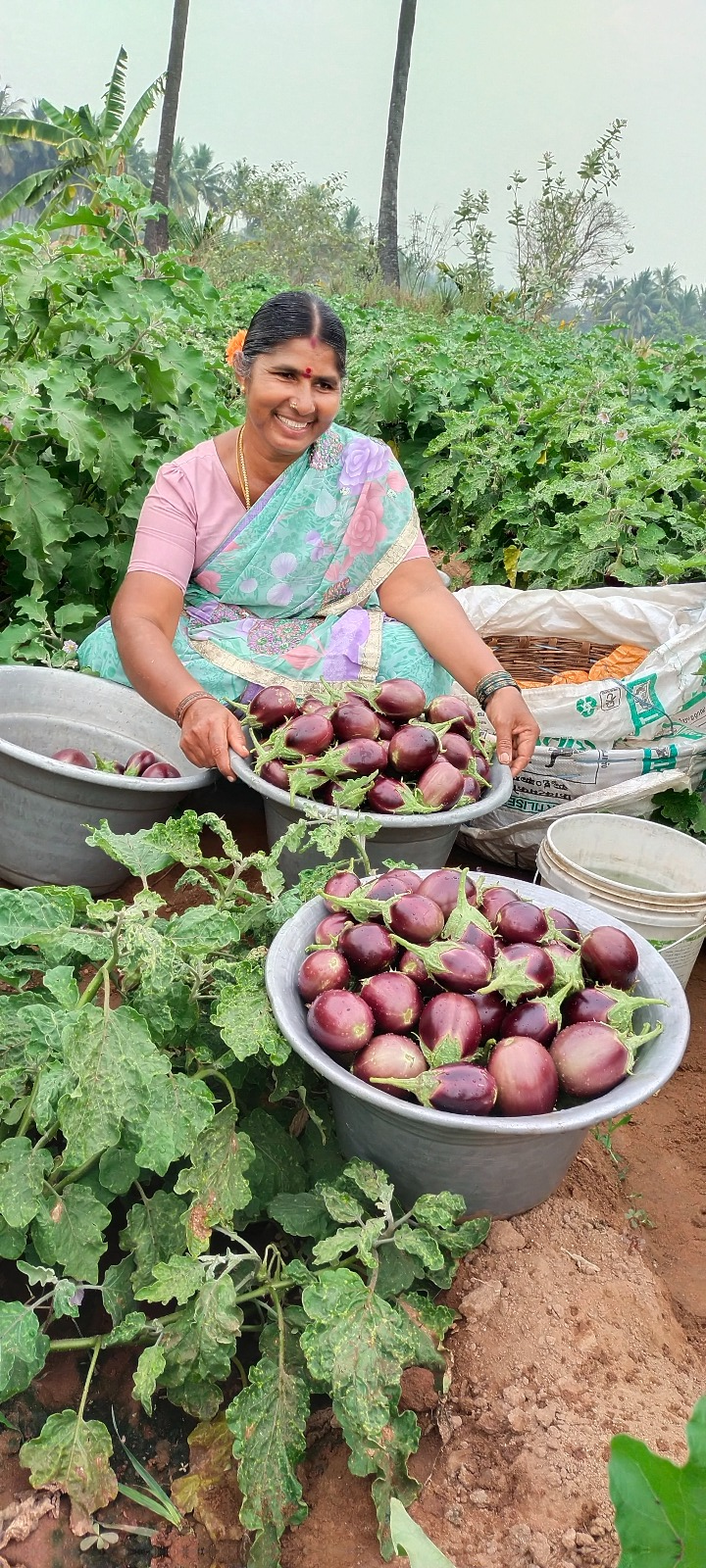
Freshly harvested Vellore Spiny Brinjals

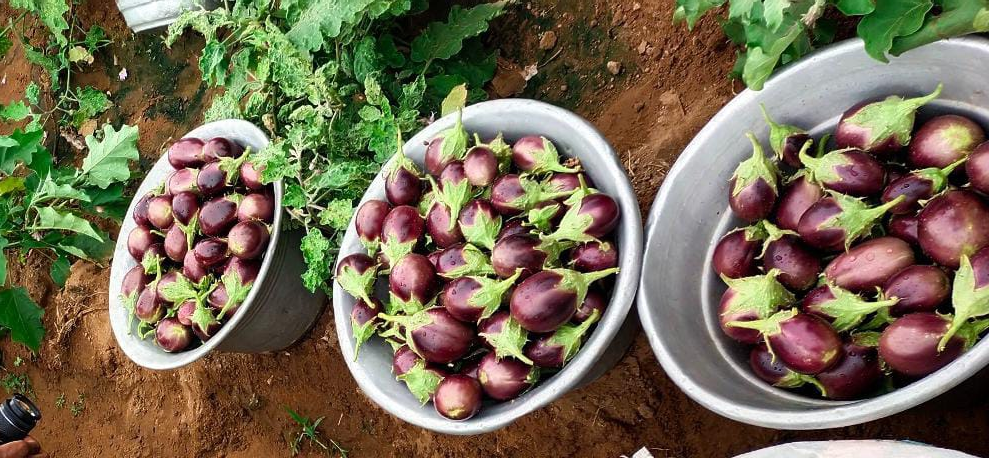
Another photo of freshly harvested Vellore Spiny Brinjals

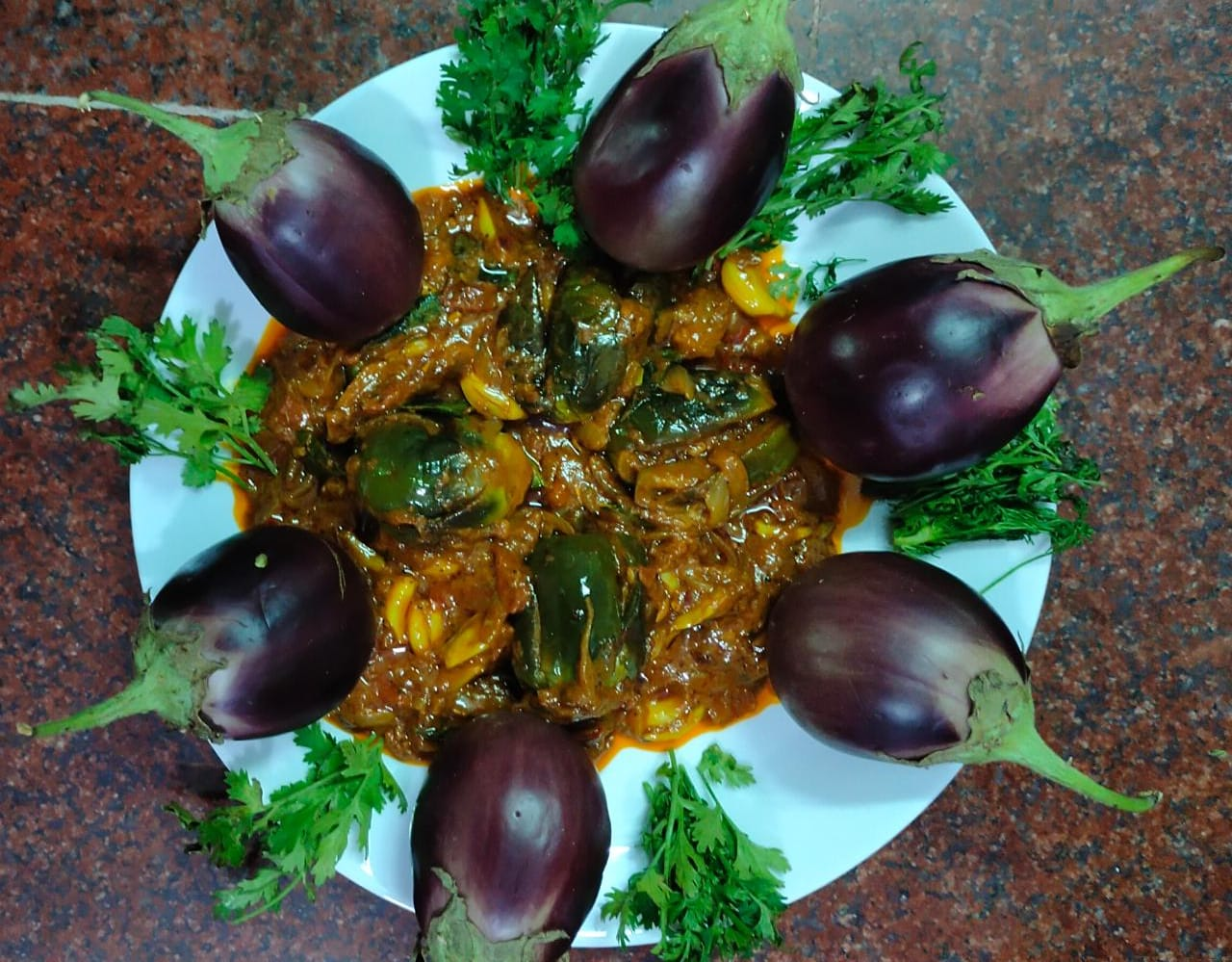
Vellore Mullu Kathirikai Podi Curry

== Geographical indication ==
It was awarded the Geographical Indication (GI) status tag from the Geographical Indications Registry, under the Union Government of India, on 22 February 2023 and is valid until 28 October 2031.

South India Multi State Agriculture Cooperative Society Limited from Vellore, proposed the GI registration of Vellore Spiny brinjal. After filing the application in October 2021, the Brinjal was granted the GI tag in 2023 by the Geographical Indication Registry in Chennai, making the name "Vellore Spiny brinjal" exclusive to the Brinjal grown in the region. It thus became the first brinjal variety from Tamil Nadu and the 46th type of goods from Tamil Nadu to earn the GI tag.

The GI tag protects the brinjal from illegal selling and marketing, and gives it legal protection and a unique identity.

== See also ==
- Jalgaon Bharit Brinjal
- Agsechi Vayingim (Agassaim Brinjal)
- Nayagarh Kanteimundi brinjal
