= Vellore division =

Vellore division is a revenue division in the Vellore district of Tamil Nadu, India. It comprises the taluks of 1.Katpadi 2.Vellore and 3.Anaicut and 4.Gudiyattam, 5.Peranambattu.
