= Kandipedu =

Kandipedu Kandipedu Village
- Neighbourhood
- Location in Tamil Nadu, India
- Coordinates: 12.9995442°N 79.223142°E
- Country: India
- State: Tamil Nadu
- District: Vellore District
- Taluk: Katpadi

Languages
  - Official: Tamil
  - Mostly Spoken: Tamil, Telugu
- Time zone: UTC+5:30 (IST)
- PIN: 632106
- Telephone code: 91 416
- Vehicle registration: TN 23
- Lok Sabha constituency: Arakkonam
- Vidhan Sabha constituency: Katpadi
- Assembly MLA: Durai Murugan

Kandipedu (pronounced [kanːdːpedu]) is a village in Katpadi, at the northern part of Vellore city in the Indian state of Tamil Nadu. It sits on the Katpadi-Vallimalai railway line, near Thiruvalluvar University, one of India's premier educational institutions.

== Governance ==
Kandipedu is a village with its own Panchayat office. It has a major assembly constituency that is part of Arakkonam (Lok Sabha constituency).

== Geography ==
The village of Kandipedu lies on the northern side of the Katpadi with the Andhra Pradesh state border nearby.

== Education ==
Kandipedu Panchayat School serves hundreds of students in the region. Also in the area is Thiruvalluvar University. Thituvalluvar University was opened in 2002 and is composed of seven departments. At the university, students can major in things such as Economics, English, Chemistry and many more. This provides people who live in Kandipedu with easy access to higher education.

== Demographics ==
According to Census of 2011, Kandipedu's population was 2,794. Of those, 1359 are males while 1435 are females. The village also contains 239 children in the age range 0–6 years old. Out of the 239 children, 125 of them are boys and 114 of them are girls.

The literacy rate of the village is 77%. The male literacy rate is at 82% and the female literacy rate is 73%. This represents a common trend in India of the male literacy rate being significantly higher than the female literacy rate.

The village is currently in the middle of some economic problems. There are more people living in the village who are unemployed than those who are employed. 1202 villagers report being employed compared to 1592 who are unemployed. Of the 1202 who are employed, 146 of them are engaged in subsistence farming.

== Transport ==
There are a variety of methods of transport that the villagers can use to move around the surrounding area. For short distance journeys there are bus routes that the villagers can take. The bus route for Kandipedu from vellore is via katpadi - Pallikuppam - Kasam. The government bus names are 14Serkadu, 20BPeriya Bodinatham, 20MPonnai, 20AVallimalai, 20Ammorpalli. The Private bus names are Raja, Malliga, AKB, MVM. The village is also located roughly 10Km away from a railway station. This allows for residents of the village to move more freely around India.
