= Anaicut block =

The Anaicut block is a revenue block in the Vellore district of Tamil Nadu, India. It has a total of 38 panchayat villages, including the Anaicut village, and two towns, Odugathur and Pallikonda.
