= Chendathur =

Village in Tamil Nadu, India

Coordinates: 12°52′17″N 78°46′57″E

Chendathur is a village and gram panchayat in Gudiyatham taluk and Pernambut block, Vellore district, Tamil Nadu, India (formerly in North Arcot). As of 2011 it had a population of 3,285 comprising 1,583 males and 1,702 females in 840 households.

Hamlets in Chendathur include Krishnampalli.

In 2021 contamination of the water supply by industrial waste from tanneries in the area including Chendathur was investigated. In 2024 a serious outbreak of illness, including a death, befell the villagers, resulting from contaminated water, and deep excavation works were undertaken to provide a new water supply.
