= Melmoil =

Melmoil Melmayil
- village
- Location in Tamil Nadu, India Melmoil (India)
- Coordinates: 12.9889496°N 78.9933360°E
- Country: India
- State: Tamil Nadu
- District: Vellore

Languages
  - Official: Tamil
- Time zone: UTC+5:30 (IST)
- Postal code: 632203
- Vehicle registration: TN 23

Melmoil is a small village in Vellore district near K.V.Kuppam.

== Sri Sakthi Vel Muruga Peruman Aalayam – Mayilaadum Malai, Near Melmoil ==
Introduction

Sri Sakthi Vel Muruga Peruman Aalayam, located at Mayilaadum Malai in the vicinity of Melmoil, is a Hindu temple that worships the god Murugan, famous for its unique architecture and regional worship practices.

=== Unique Features of the Temple ===
- Separate Sanctums (Karuvarai): The temple has individual sanctums for Lord Murugan, Goddess Valli, and Goddess Deivanai, which is a rare architectural and spiritual feature. Each deity is given individual space for worship, highlighting the equal importance of divine love (Valli), divine grace (Deivanai), and divine power (Murugan).
- Murugan Idol of 9.75 Feet (9¾ ft): The main idol of Sri Muruga Peruman stands at an awe-inspiring height of 9¾ feet, making it a one-of-a-kind statue that you cannot find anywhere else. The sheer presence of the deity leaves devotees in awe, and many report feeling an instant connection and upliftment in his presence.

=== Founders and History ===
The temple was founded in 1970 by the revered Milagai Siddhargal – Srila Sri Nagaraja Swamigal and Srimathi Thilagavathy Ammaiyar. Their vision was to create a spiritually charged center dedicated to Lord Murugan and the energies of Sakthi, providing a space where devotees could connect deeply with divinity through Murugan worship and Siddhar tradition.

Their legacy continues to inspire spiritual seekers, and the temple remains a center for Murugan bhakti, meditation, and traditional worship practices.
