= Virupakshipuram =

- city
- Location in Tamil Nadu, India
- Coordinates: 12°53′36″N 79°07′59″E
- Country: India
- State: Tamil Nadu
- District: Vellore

Population (2001)
  - Total: 12,431

Languages
  - Official: Tamil
- Time zone: UTC+5:30 (IST)

Virupakshipuram is a part of Vellore city in the Indian state of Tamil Nadu.

== Demographics ==
At the time of the 2001 Indian census, Virupakshipuram had a population of 12,431. Males constituted 51% of the population and females 49%. Virupakshipuram had an average literacy rate of 71%, higher than the national average of 59.5%: male literacy was 76% and female literacy was 66%. 9% of the population were under 6 years of age.
