= Chettithangal =

- Census town
- Location in Tamil Nadu, India
- Coordinates: 12°57′10″N 79°20′24″E
- Country: India
- State: Tamil Nadu
- District: Vellore

Population (2001)
  - Total: 6,029

Languages
  - Official: Tamil
- Time zone: UTC+5:30 (IST)

Chettithangal is a census town in Vellore district in the state of Tamil Nadu, India.

== Demographics ==
At the 2001 India census, Chettithangal had a population of 6,029. Males constituted 50% of the population and females 50%. Chettithangal has an average literacy rate of 70%, higher than the national average of 59.5%, with male literacy of 79% and female literacy of 60%. 10% of the population was under 6 years of age.
