= Palavansathu =

Palavansathu Palavansaathu
- neighbourhood
- Location in Tamil Nadu, India
- Coordinates: 12°53′47″N 79°07′31″E
- Country: India
- State: Tamil Nadu
- District: Vellore

Government
  - Mayor: Mrs.P.Karthiyayini

Population (2001)
  - Total: 16,136

Languages
  - Official: Tamil
- Time zone: UTC+5:30 (IST)

Palavansathu is a locality in Vellore City in the Indian state of Tamil Nadu. This locality of Vellore gives evidence that the area of Vellore was under the administrative control of the Pallava empire. The meaning of Palavansathu could be the corruption of two words Pallavan and Sarndha (belonging to), thus Pallavan Sarnthu would have become Palavansathu over time.

== Demographics ==
As of 2001 India census, Palavansathu had a population of 16,136. Males constitute 51% of the population and females 49%. Palavansathu has an average literacy rate of 76%, higher than the national average of 59.5%: male literacy is 81%, and female literacy is 70%. In Palavansathu, 8% of the population is under 6 years of age.
