= K Velur =

K Velur Kalavai velur
- Village
- Location in Tamil Nadu, India K Velur (India)
- Coordinates: 12.8107°N 79.3882°E
- Country: India
- State: Tamil Nadu
- District: Vellore

Languages
  - Official: Tamil
- Time zone: UTC+5:30 (IST)
- PIN: 632506
- Telephone code: 04173
- Vehicle registration: TN-23, TN-73
- Nearest city: Arcot
- Lok Sabha constituency: Arcot
- Climate: hot (Köppen)
- Website: www.kalavaivelur.blogspot.com

K Velur is a village located in Vellore district, Tamil Nadu, India.
