= Elavambadi =

Village in Tamil Nadu, India

- Village
- Location in Tamil Nadu, India Elavambadi (India)
- Coordinates: 12.87°N 79.05°E
- Country: India
- State: Tamil Nadu
- District: Vellore district
- Taluka: Anaicut

Languages
  - Official: Tamil
- Time zone: UTC+5:30 (IST)
- PIN: 632011

Elavambadi is a village in the Anaicut taluka of Vellore district located in Tamil Nadu State, India.

== Farming ==
Vellore Spiny brinjal is a prized, native vegetable crop in Vellore and so named after it. The term "Spiny" is used as this brinjal variety is easily identifiable due to its distinctive thorns. It is locally known as 'Elavambadi Mullu Kathrikai' (Tamil: எலவம்பாடி முள்ளு கத்திரிகை) in the local state language of Tamil. This name refers to the village of its origin, Elavambadi, and literally translates to "thorny brinjal" (Mullu: thorns, Kathrikai: brinjal).

== Geographical indication ==
It was awarded the Geographical Indication (GI) status tag from the Geographical Indications Registry, under the Union Government of India, on 22 February 2023 and is valid until 28 October 2031.

South India Multi State Agriculture Cooperative Society Limited from Vellore, proposed the GI registration of Vellore Spiny brinjal. After filing the application in October 2021, the Brinjal was granted the GI tag in 2023 by the Geographical Indication Registry in Chennai, making the name "Vellore Spiny brinjal" exclusive to the Brinjal grown in the region. It thus became the first brinjal variety from Tamil Nadu and the 46th type of goods from Tamil Nadu to earn the GI tag.

The GI tag protects the brinjal from illegal selling and marketing, and gives it legal protection and a unique identity.
