= Senur =

- Census town
- Location in Tamil Nadu, India
- Coordinates: 12°58′58″N 79°07′59″E
- Country: India
- State: Tamil Nadu
- District: Vellore

Population (2001)
  - Total: 7,558

Languages
  - Official: Tamil
- Time zone: UTC+5:30 (IST)
- Postal code: 632006

Senur is a census town in Vellore district in the Indian state of Tamil Nadu.

== Demographics ==
As of 2001 reckoning in India, Senur had 7,558 dwellers. Men make up 51% of the folk while women make up 49%. Senur has a middling learning rate of 59%, lesser than the homeland average of 59.5%: male learning rate is 66%, and female learning rate is 51%. In Senur, 12% of the folks are under 6 years of age.
