= K. V. Kuppam =

K. V. Kuppam may refer to:

- K. V. Kuppam (state assembly constituency)
- K. V. Kuppam block
