= Karugampattur =

- Census town
- Location in Tamil Nadu, India
- Coordinates: 12°55′34″N 79°06′20″E
- Country: India
- State: Tamil Nadu
- District: Vellore

Population (2001)
  - Total: 5,272

Languages
  - Official: Tamil
- Time zone: UTC+5:30 (IST)

Karugampattur 632013 is a census town in Vellore district in the Indian state of Tamil Nadu.

== Demographics ==
As of 2001 India census, Karugampattur had a population of 5272. Males constitute 50% of the population and females 50%. Karugampattur has an average literacy rate of 59%, lower than the national average of 59.5%: male literacy is 69%, and female literacy is 49%. In Karugampattur, 14% of the population is under 6 years of age.
