= Vallimalai =

- Neighbourhood
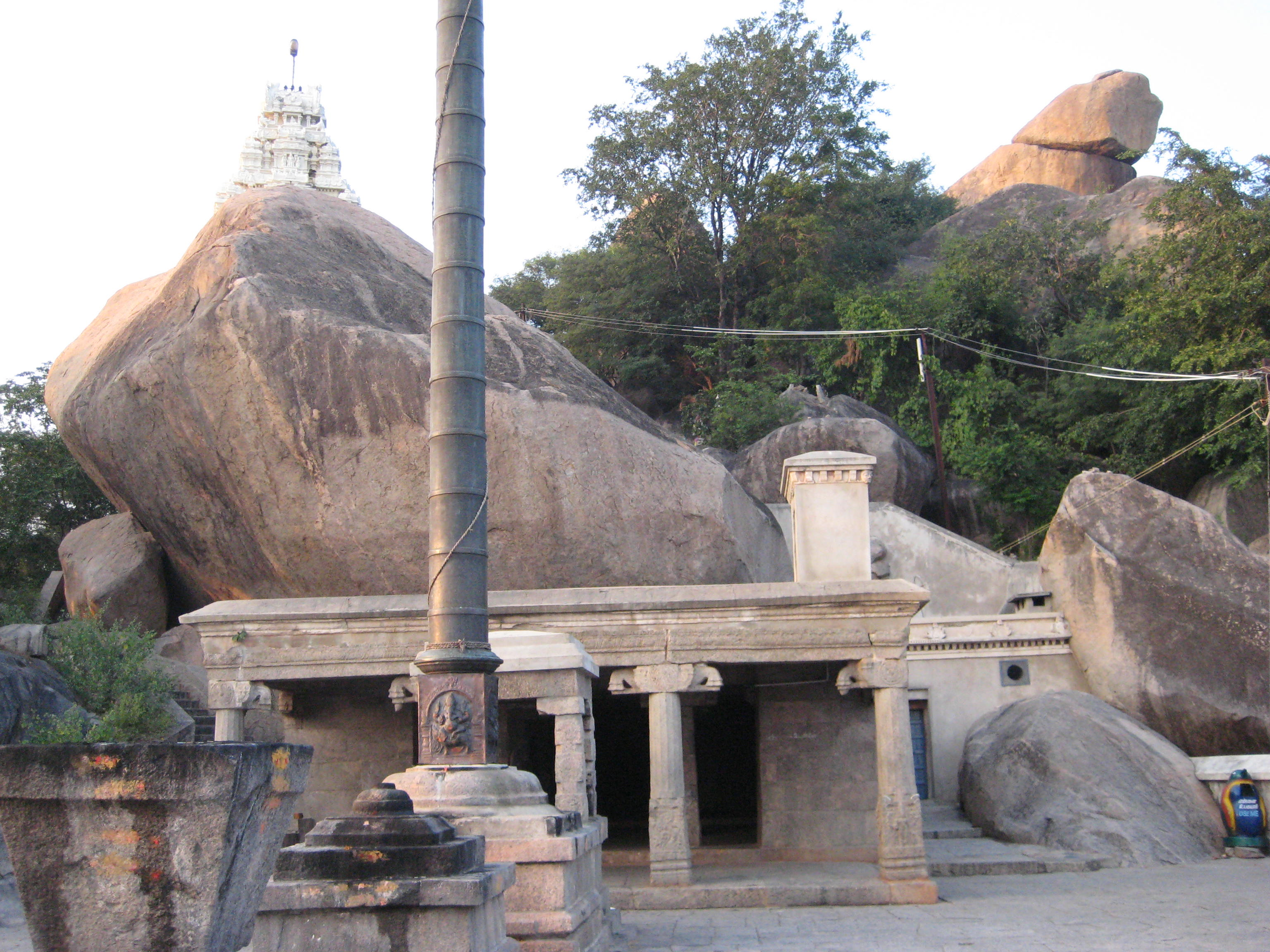
- Subramanya Temple, Vallimalai

- Vallimalai, Vellore district, Tamil Nadu
- Coordinates: 13.0725°N 79.2712°E
- Country: India
- State: Tamil Nadu
- District: Vellore district
- Elevation: 268 m (879 ft)

Languages
  - Official: Tamil, English
- Time zone: UTC+5:30 (IST)
- PIN: 632520
- Telephone Code: +914172xxxxxx
- District Collector: P. Kumaravel Pandian, I. A. S.
- Lok Sabha: Arakkonam
- Vidhan Sabha: Katpadi
- MP: S. Jagathrakshakan
- MLA: Durai Murugan

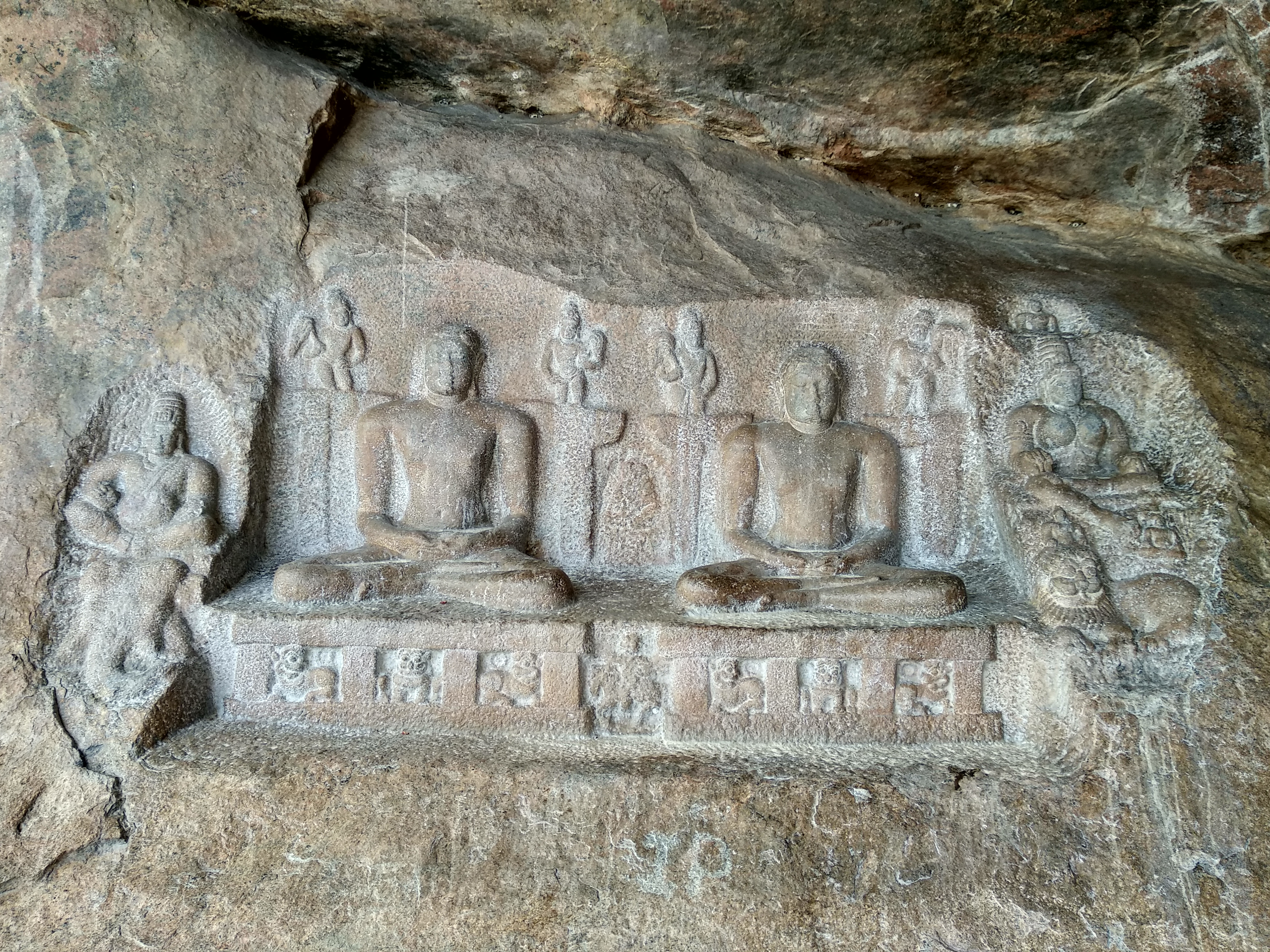
Jain tirthankars in Cave

Vallimalai is a village in Katpadi taluk (Vellore North Taluk ) of Vellore district, Tamil Nadu, India. The Pallava dynasty built the Subramaniyar temple, a rock cut temple to Murugan. The temple is one of the monuments of national importance in Tamil Nadu.

== Vallimalai Jain caves ==
Western Ganga dynasty king Raja Mallan-I carved caves for Jain monks who lived here to spread Jainism in Tamilakam.
