= Allapuram =

- neighbourhood
- Location in Tamil Nadu, India
- Coordinates: 12.9018°N 79.133°E
- Country: India
- State: Tamil Nadu
- District: Vellore

Government
  - mayor: Mrs P.Karthiyayini

Population (2001)
  - Total: 26,660

Languages
  - Official: Tamil
- Time zone: UTC+5:30 (IST)
- Telephone code: 0416
- Vehicle registration: TN 23

Allapuram is a part of Vellore city in the state of Tamil Nadu in southern India.It is located on vellore's arterial road "Officer's lane" and also this locality is near to Vellore Central Prison.

== Demographics ==
As of 2001 India census, Allapuram had a population of 26,660. Males constitute 50% of the population and females 50%. Allapuram has an average literacy rate of 76%, higher than the national average of 59.5%; with 53% of the males and 47% of females literate. 11% of the population is under 6 years of age.
