= Guruvarajapet =

Guruvarajapeet
- Census town
- Location in Tamil Nadu, India Guruvarajapeet (India)
- Coordinates: 13°06′45″N 79°32′50″E
- Country: India
- State: Tamil Nadu
- District: Vellore district

Population (2011 Indian census)
  - Total: 12,458 people

Languages
  - Official: Tamil
- Time zone: UTC+5:30 (IST)
- Postal code: 631101

Guruvarajapet is a census town located in the Indian state of Tamil Nadu.

== Geography ==
It is located 85 km from the state capital of Chennai.

== Demographics ==
=== Population ===
According to the 2011 Indian Census, Guruvarajapet has a population of 12,550, consisting of 6,284 males and 6,266 females. According to the census, there are 1,408 children between the ages of 0–6, accounting for 11.23% of the total population. The Guruvarajapet City Municipality is responsible for providing basic services to over 2,999 local households. The literacy rate in Guruvarajapet is 72.71%, which is lower than the state average of 80.09%. The literacy rate of the male population is 83.99%, while that of the female population is 61.52%. The majority of employed people in Guruvarajapet are weavers and the village remains one of the principal lungi manufacturing villages in the Vellore district.

=== Religion ===
| Hindu | 98.37% |
| Muslim | 0.47% |
| Christian | 0.32% |
| Sikh | 0.01% |
| Buddhist | 0.00% |
| Jain | 0.01% |
| Others | 0.02% |
| Not Stated | 0.81% |

=== Languages ===
Tamil is the most widely spoken language in Guruvarajapet, though Telugu is also prevalent as the village neighbors the Telugu-speaking state of Andhra Pradesh.

== Politics ==
Guruvarajapet is part of the Arakkonam (Lok Sabha constituency). The AIDMK candidate Ravi Subramani won the Arakkonam assembly constituency in the 2016 elections. In the 2009 parliamentary elections, the DMK candidate Shri S. Jagathrakshakan was elected as the MP from this constituency. In the 2014 Lok Sabha election, L. Hari Krishnan of AIADMK won the parliamentary seat from the DMK with a margin of over 240,000 votes. He polled 493,534 votes while the DMK candidate N.R. Elango polled just 252,768.

== Education ==
The P.A. Sekar Scientific Research Center was established in Guruvarajapet by P. A. Sekar for the promotion of innovation in rural businesses like textile weaving and agriculture. This scientific research center received the Best Invention Award 2014 and Sakar delivered a speech at the Indian Institute of Technology Madras about his new inventions to aid the handloom and power loom industry.

A Government Higher Secondary School and several other public schools are located throughout Guruvarajapet.

== Notable people ==
Thiru. V. Kalyanasundaram, a famous scholar, stayed in this village for a brief period of time with Mangalam Kizhar.
