= Vellore block =

Revenue block in Tamil Nadu, India

The Vellore block is a revenue block in the Vellore district of Tamil Nadu, India. It has a total of 22 panchayat villages.
