= Sembedu =

Sembedu village
- Village
- Location in Tamil Nadu, India Sembedu village (India)
- Coordinates: 12.8107°N 79.3882°E
- Country: India
- State: Tamil Nadu
- District: Vellore

Languages
  - Official: Tamil
- Time zone: UTC+5:30 (IST)
- PIN: 632506
- Telephone code: 04173
- Vehicle registration: TN-23, TN-73
- Nearest city: Arcot
- Lok Sabha constituency: Arcot
- Climate: hot (Köppen)
- Website: www.kalavaivelur.blogspot.com

Sembedu is a village in Vellore district, Tamil Nadu. Sembedu is situated in between Arcot and Kalavai road. It is 16 km from Arcot and 7 km from Kalavai. It belongs to Sembedu Village Panchayati.
