= Thuthipattu =

Thutthipattu
- town
- Thuthipattu , Vellore district, Tamil Nadu
- Coordinates: 12°51′27″N 79°07′13″E
- Country: India
- State: Tamil Nadu
- District: Vellore

Population (2001)
  - Total: 7,068

Languages
  - Official: Tamil
- Time zone: UTC+5:30 (IST)
- PIN: 632011

Thutthipattu is a census town in Vellore district in the Indian state of Tamil Nadu.

== Demographics ==
As of 2001 India census, Thutthipattu had a population of 7068. Males constitute 49% of the population and females 51%. Thutthipattu has an average literacy rate of 64%, higher than the national average of 59.5%: male literacy is 73%, and female literacy is 56%. In Thutthipattu, 12% of the population is under 6 years of age.
