= Sevur =

- suburb
- Location in Tamil Nadu, India
- Coordinates: 12°57′49″N 78°51′18″E
- Country: India
- State: Tamil Nadu
- District: Vellore

Government
  - mayor: p.karthikeyan

Population (2001)
  - Total: 8,645

Languages
  - Official: Tamil
- Time zone: UTC+5:30 (IST)

Sevoor or Sevoor is a rural suburb of Vellore city in the Indian state of Tamil Nadu.

== Demographics ==
As of 2001 India census, Sevur had a population of 8645. Males constitute 50% of the population and females 50%. Sevur has an average literacy rate of 52%, lower than the national average of 59.5%: male literacy is 62%, and female literacy is 42%. In Sevur, 14% of the population is under 6 years of age.
