= Katpadi block =

Coordinates: 12.98°N 79.13°E

The Katpadi block is a revenue block in the Vellore district of Tamil Nadu, India. It has a total of 23 panchayat villages.
