= National Highway 46 (India, old numbering) =

Old numbering of road in India

National Highway 46
- Map of Old NH46 in red
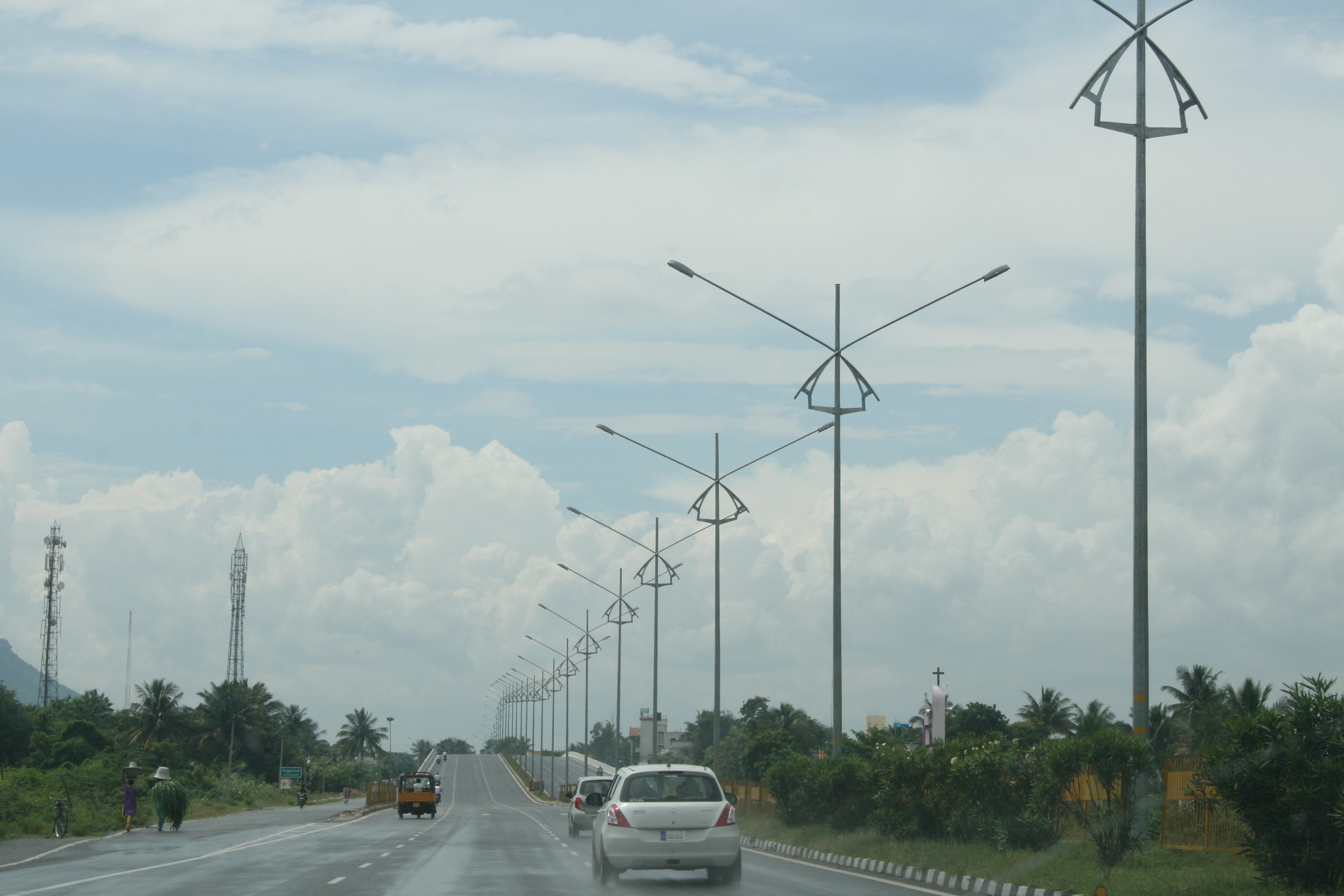
- Old NH 46 near Vellore

Route information
- Length: 148 km (92 mi)

Major junctions
- West end: Krishnagiri, Tamil Nadu
- East end: Walajapet in Ranipet, Tamil Nadu

Location
- Country: India
- States: Tamil Nadu: 148 km (92 mi)
- Primary destinations: Vaniyambadi - Ambur - Vellore - Arcot

Highway system
- Roads in India; Expressways; National; State; Asian
← NH 45C	→ NH 47

National Highway 46 was a national highway in the Indian state of Tamil Nadu. It ran from Krishnagiri to Walajapet in Ranipet in the state. It passed through Vellore and it was a highly important connecting road for vehicles travelling between Chennai and Bangalore. The total Length of NH 46 was 148 km (92 mi). The Krishnagiri-Walajapet section is being upgraded to six lanes by L&T on a build-operate-transfer basis.

== Renumbering ==
Old national highway 46 has been renumbered as National Highway 48, which runs from Delhi to Chennai via Mumbai and Bangalore.

== Route ==
Krishnagiri, Bargur, Nattrampalli, Vaniyambadi, Ambur, Pallikonda, Vellore, Melvisharam, Arcot, Ranipet and Walajapet.

== Gallery ==
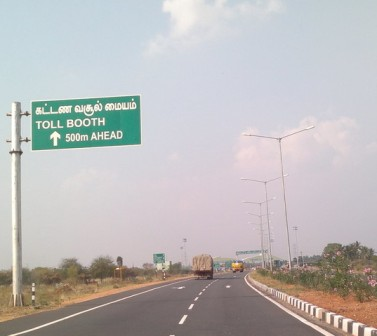
NH 46

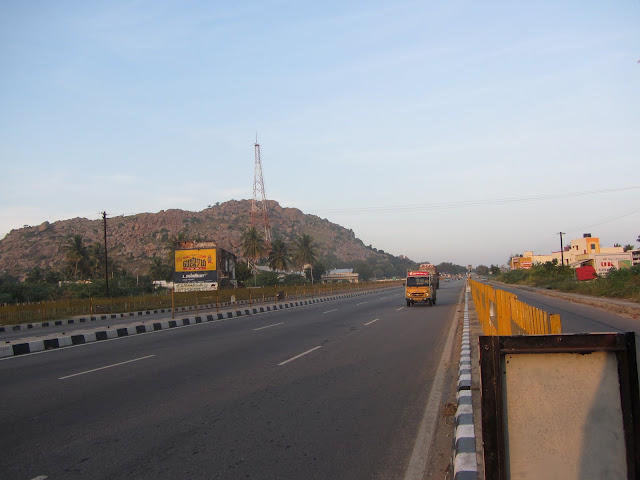
NH 46 near Krishnagiri

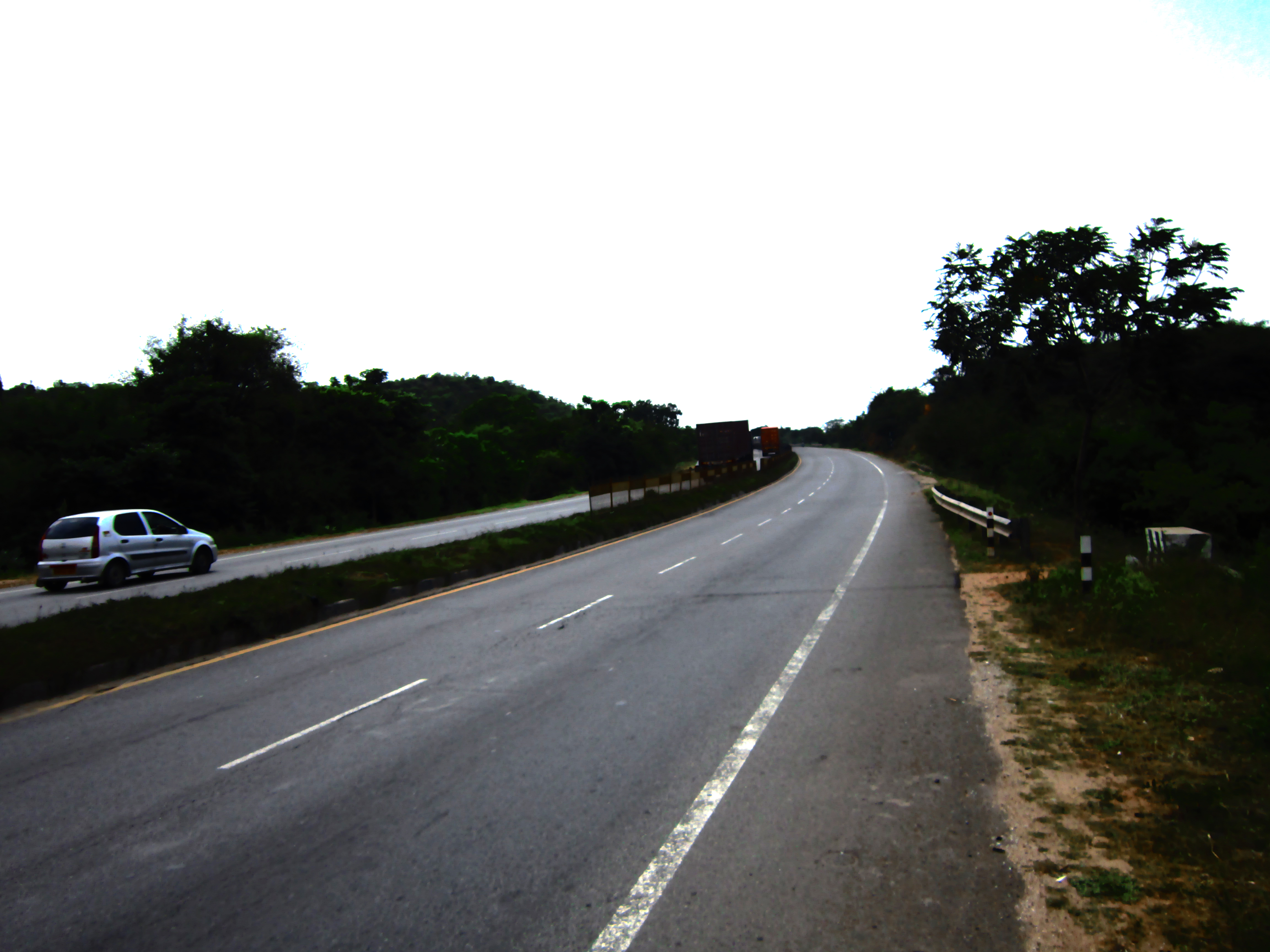
NH 46

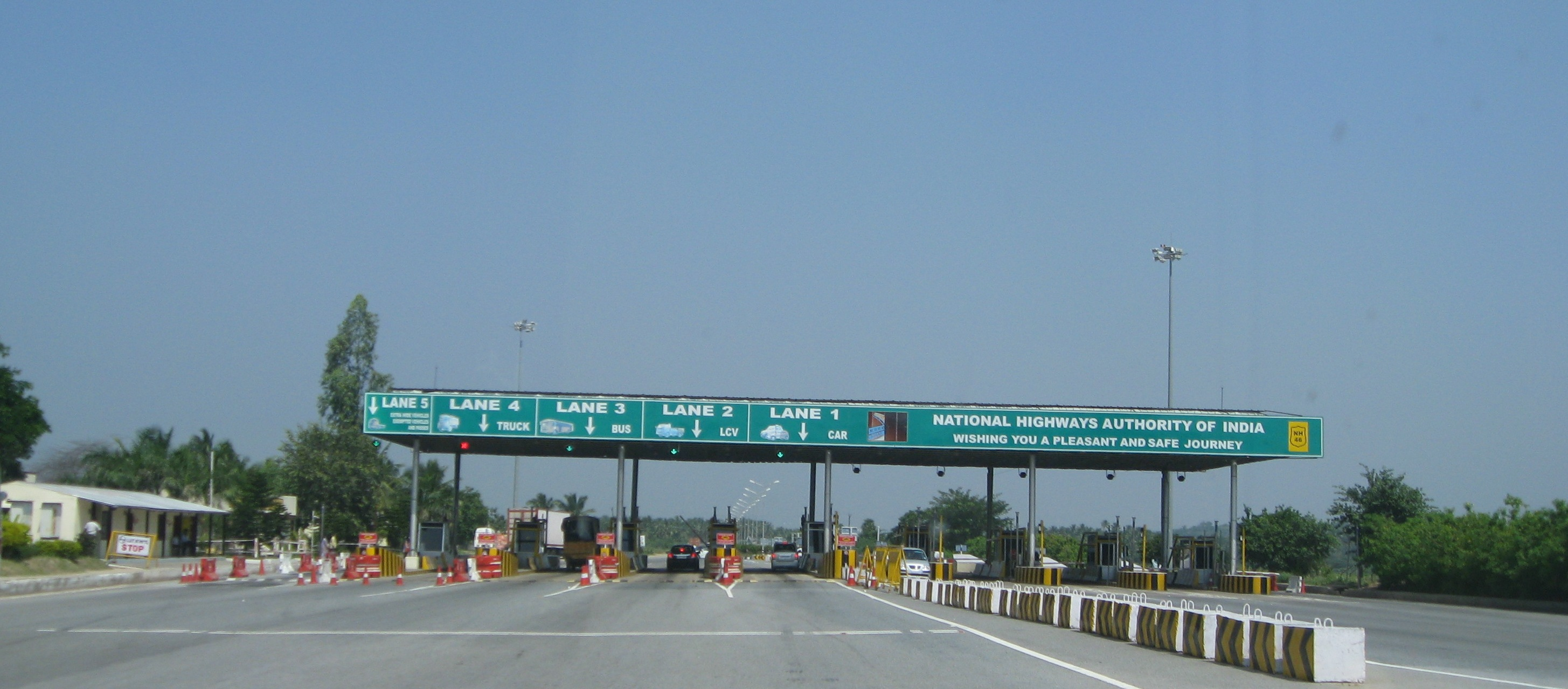
Vaniyambadi-Toll-Plaza on NH46

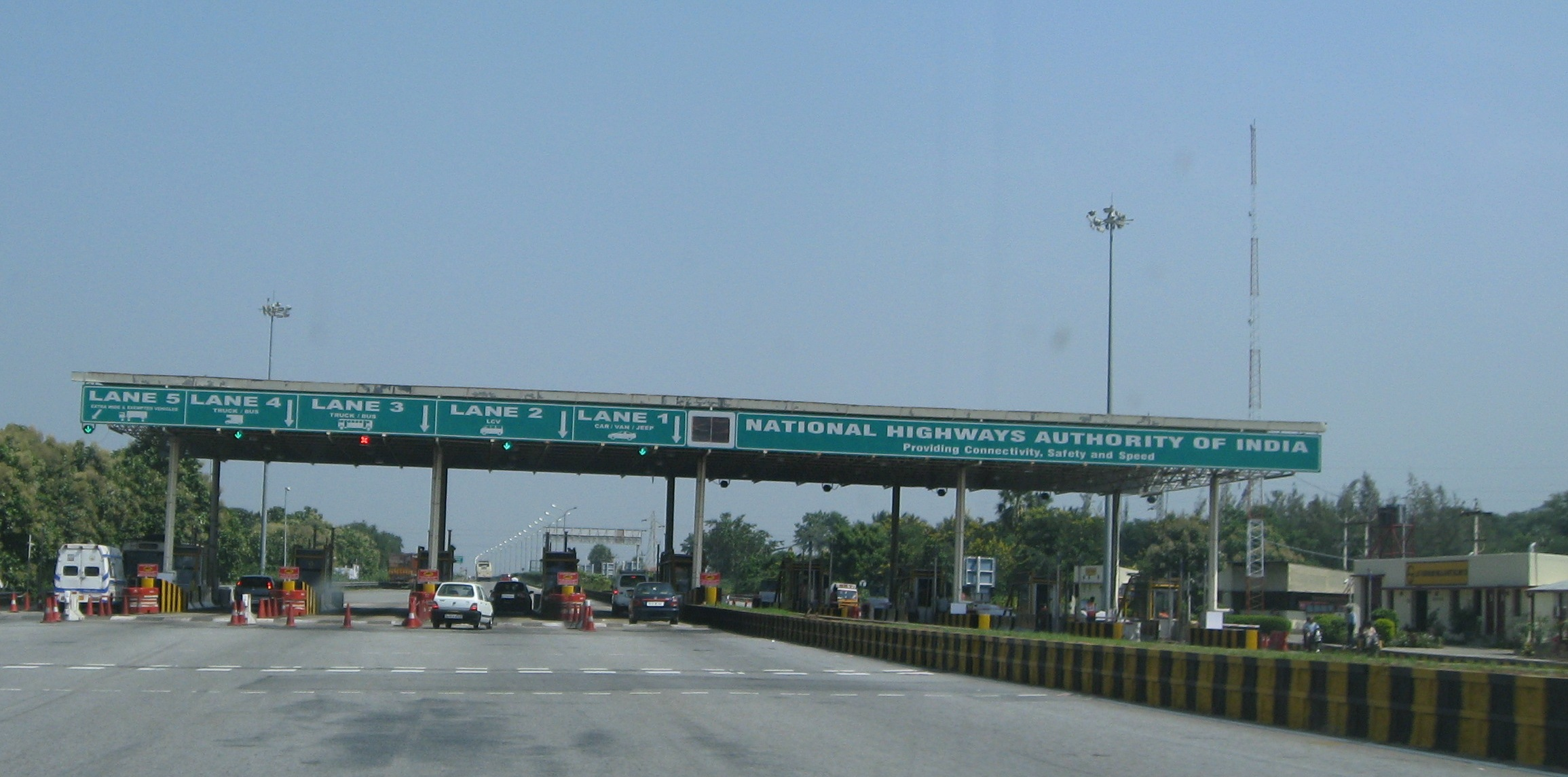
Pallikonda Toll-Plaza on NH46

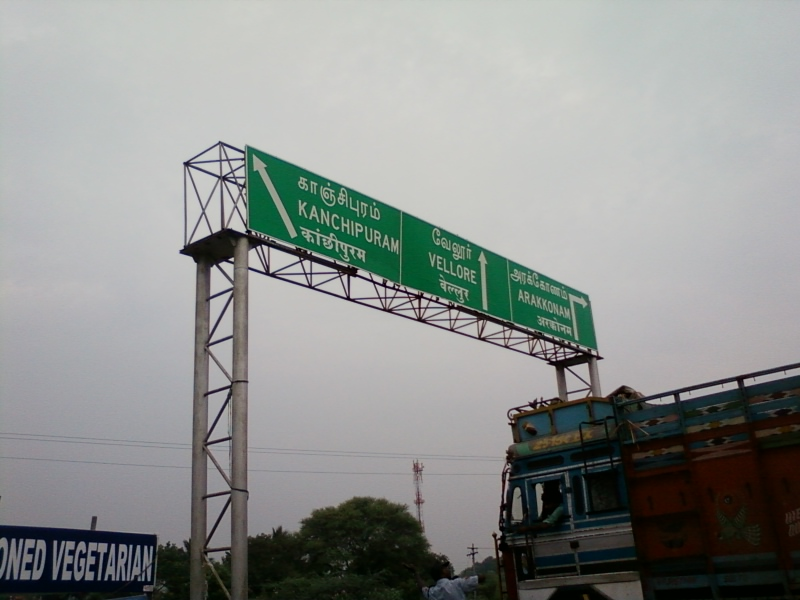
Sign board on NH 46 between Chennai and Vellore.

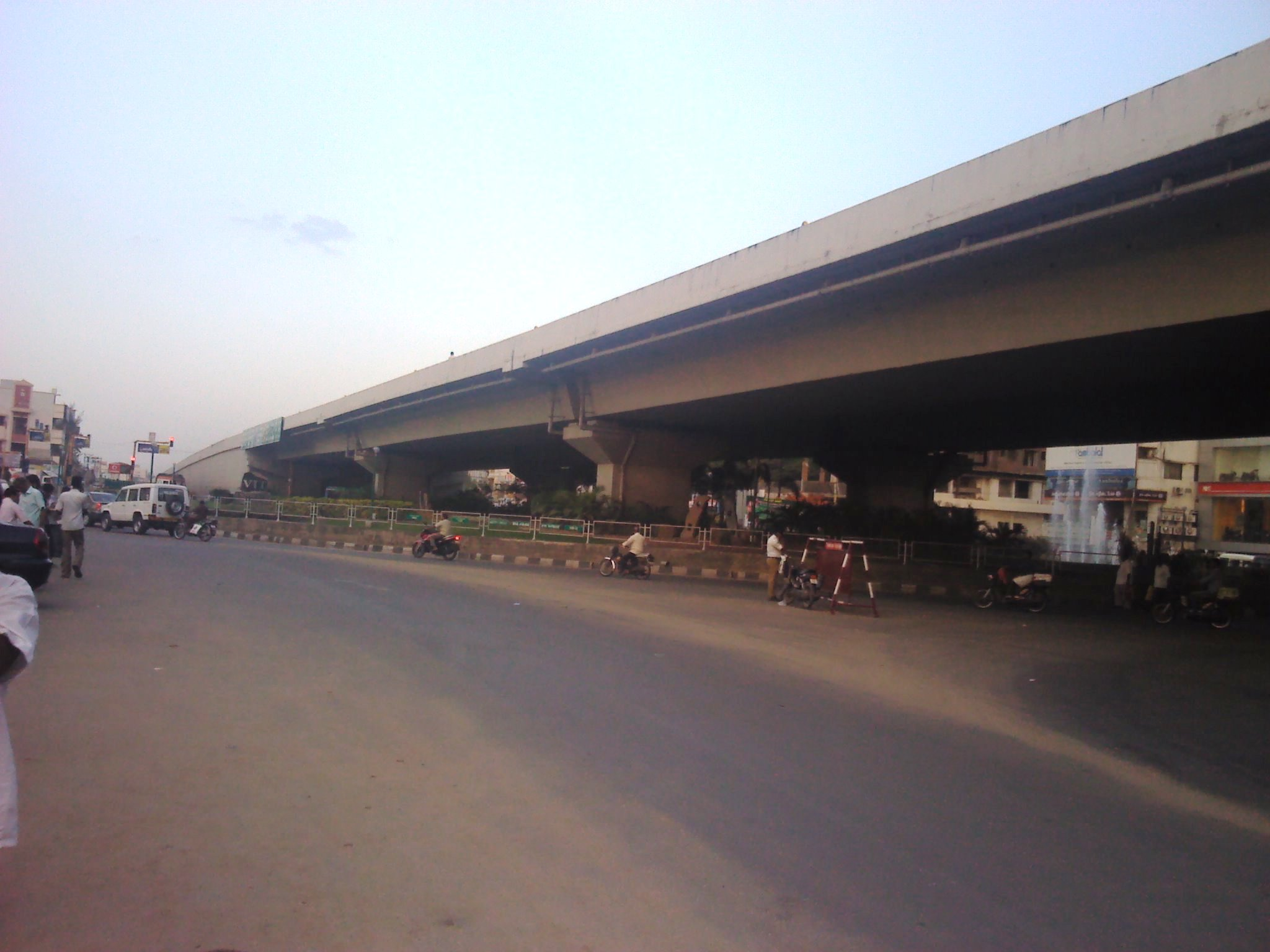
Green Circle Junction flyover on NH 46 in Vellore city

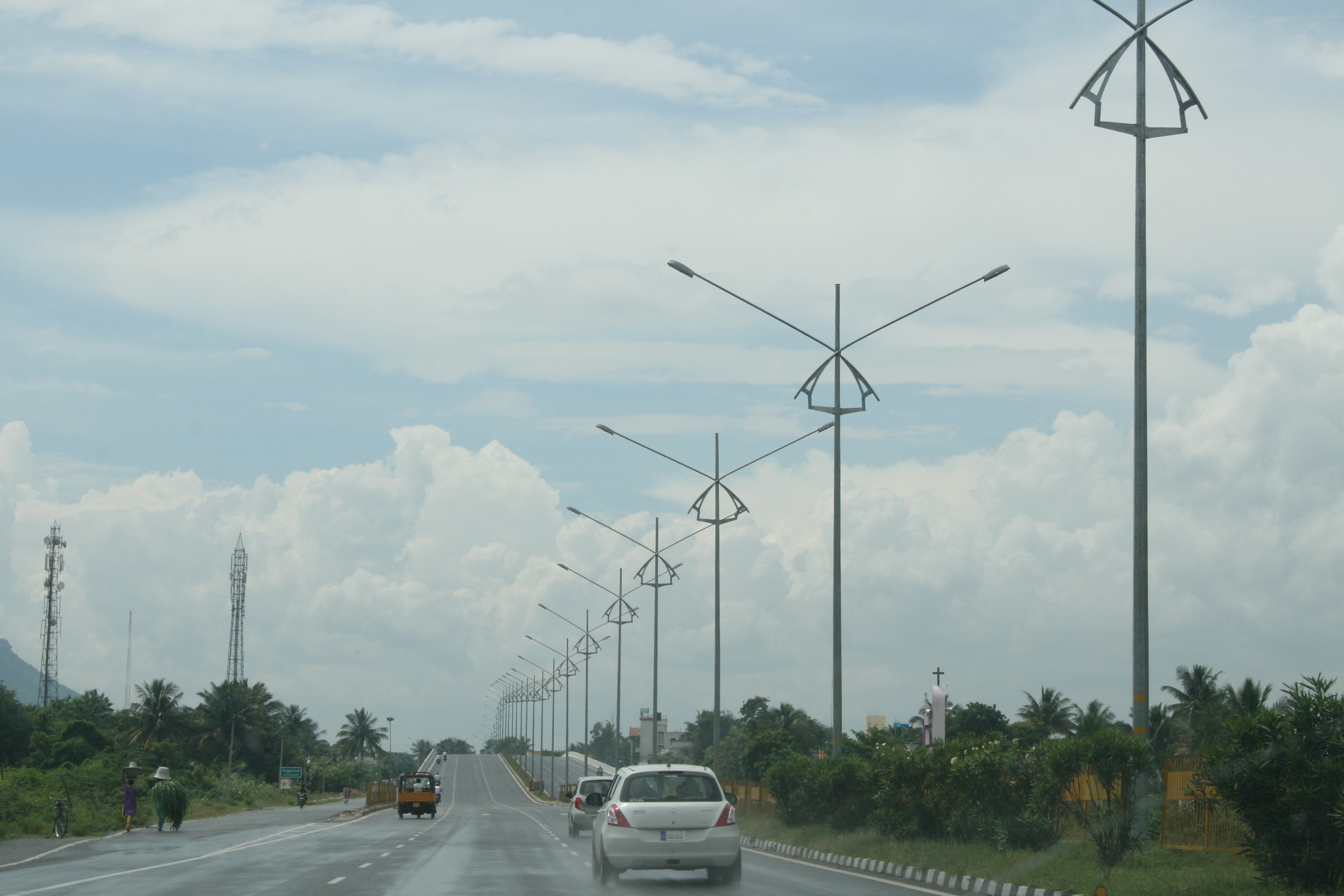
NationalHighway46India

== See also ==
- National Highways Development Project
