= Ponnai =

- Location in Tamil Nadu, India
- Coordinates: 13°8′0″N 79°16′0″E
- Country: India
- State: Tamil Nadu
- District: Vellore
- Elevation: 243 m (797 ft)

Population
  - Total: 15,850

Languages
  - Official: Tamil
- Time zone: UTC+5:30 (IST)
- PIN: 632514
- Vehicle registration: TN - 23
- Nearest city: Vellore
- Lok Sabha constituency: Arakkonam
- Website: ponnai.com

Ponnai is a Town panchayat which is located in the Vellore District within the state of Tamil Nadu. Ponnai Panchayat is composed of 18 villages, with Ponnai serving as the head town.

== Transport ==
Nearby towns are linked by rail and air. Frequent buses are available to Vellore, Tiruttani, Arcot, Chittoor and Sholinghur. Buses to Chennai, Bangalore, Tirupathi, Kanchipuram, Tambaram, and Chengalpattu run less frequently.

The nearest railway stations are Chittoor in Andhra Pradesh, and Vellore Katpadi Junction in Tamil Nadu.

The nearest port is in Chennai, and the nearest airports are Tirupathi in Andhra Pradesh, Chennai in Tamil Nadu, and Vellore Airport.

== Politics ==
The Katpadi assembly constituency is part of the Arakkonam (Lok Sabha constituency).
