= Pernambut =

Town in Vellore district, Tamil Nadu, India

- Town
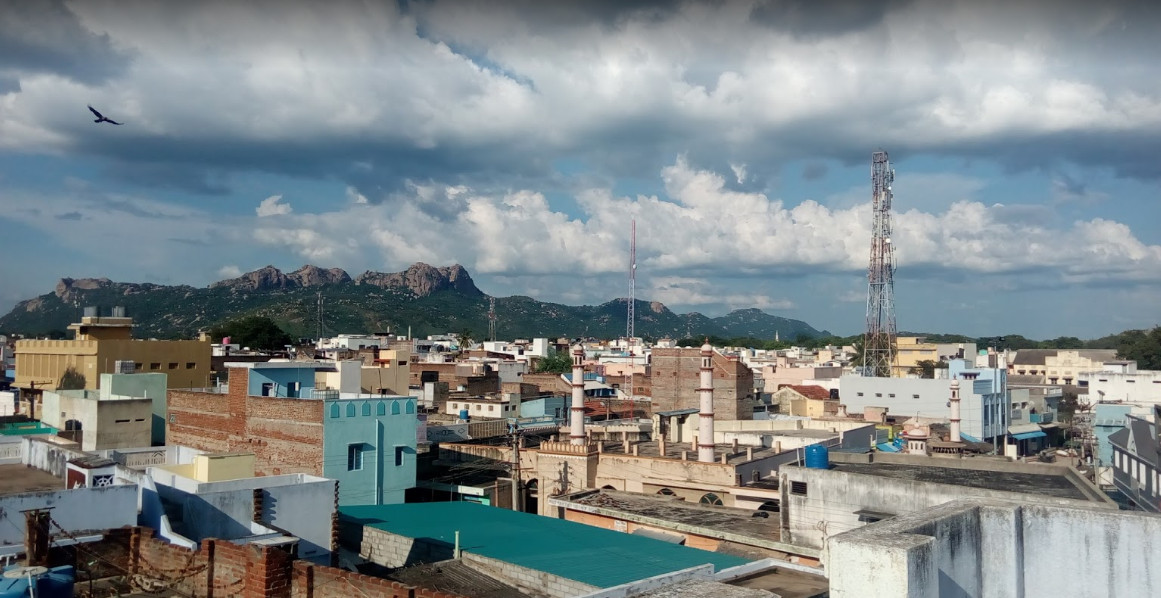
- Pernambut Town
- Nickname: Leather City
- Location in Tamil Nadu, India
- Coordinates: 12.9387°N 78.7028°E
- Country: India
- State: Tamil Nadu
- District: Vellore district

Government
  - Type: Municipality
  - Body: Pernambut Municipality

Area
  - Total: 12.97 km^{2} (5.01 sq mi)

Population (2011)
  - Total: 51,271
  - Density: 3,953/km^{2} (10,240/sq mi)

Languages
  - Official: Tamil
- Time zone: UTC+5:30 (IST)
- PIN: 635810
- Telephone code: 04171
- Vehicle registration: TN-23
- Sex ratio: 1,028 ♂/♀

Pernambut is a town located in the Vellore district of the Indian state of Tamil Nadu. It serves as a regional headquarters and is known for its leather tanning industry, earning it the nickname "Leather City" of Tamil Nadu.

== Religion ==
Pernambut is a multicultural town where people of various religions live harmoniously.

- Islam: Major Muslim places of worship in Pernambut include Chowk Masjid, Jamiya Masjid, Nawab Daryakhan Masjid, Park Masjid, Road Masjid-e-Ahle Hadees, New Masjid-e-Ahle Hadees, Small Masjid-e-Ahle Hadees, Masjid-e-Istiqamath, Ahle Hadees Forquan Masjid, Masjid-e-Hassaniya Ahle Hadees, Ahle Hadees Jamiya Masjid, Masjid-e-Shekul Hadees, Masjid Umar, Masjid-e-Fazal, and several others.
- Hinduism: Prominent Hindu temples in Pernambut include Gangai Amman Kovil, Sivan Kovil, Anjaneyar Kovil, Krishnar Kovil, Vinayagar Kovil, and Venkatesa Perumal Temple (with Sri Devi and Bhu Devi).
- Christianity: Notable Christian churches in the town include St. Paul's Lutheran Church (IELC) and the Church of God (COG).

== Demographics ==
Religious census
Religion	Percent (%)
Muslim	61.56%
Hindu	36.44%
Christian	1.72%
Jain	0.10%
Other	0.15%

According to the 2011 Census of India, Pernampattu had a population of 51,271, with a sex ratio of 1,028 females for every 1,000 males — much above the national average of 929.

A total of 6,866 were under the age of six, consisting of 3,452 males and 3,414 females. Scheduled Castes and Scheduled Tribes accounted for 23.57% and 0.02% of the population respectively.

The average literacy rate of the town was 68.94%, compared to the national average of 72.99%. The town had a total of 10,450 households.

There were 16,523 workers in total — 62 cultivators, 103 main agricultural labourers, 1,602 in household industries, 12,838 in other occupations, and 1,918 marginal workers (including 30 marginal cultivators, 18 marginal agricultural labourers, 158 in household industries, and 1,712 in other sectors).

Pernambut is a multicultural town with people from all major religions. According to the 2011 Census, the population comprised 61.56% Muslims, 36.44% Hindus, 1.72% Christians, 0.02% Sikhs, 0.0% Buddhists, 0.10% Jains, and 0.15% belonging to other religions. A very small percentage of the population did not specify their religion.

== Climate ==
Climate data for Pernambut (1971–2000)
Month	Jan	Feb	Mar	Apr	May	Jun	Jul	Aug	Sep	Oct	Nov	Dec	Year
Record high °C (°F)	29.7 (85.5)	32.5 (90.5)	35.7 (96.3)	38.4 (101.1)	39.0 (102.2)	36.6 (97.9)	34.9 (94.8)	34.2 (93.6)	34.1 (93.4)	32.3 (90.1)	29.9 (85.8)	28.7 (83.7)	33.8 (92.8)
Mean daily minimum °C (°F)	17.8 (64.0)	19.3 (66.7)	21.3 (70.3)	24.7 (76.5)	25.9 (78.6)	25.6 (78.1)	24.7 (76.5)	24.2 (75.6)	23.5 (74.3)	22.3 (72.1)	20.6 (69.1)	18.7 (65.7)	22.4 (72.3)
Average precipitation mm (inches)	9.4 (0.37)	4.5 (0.18)	12.3 (0.48)	24.0 (0.94)	65.9 (2.59)	76.8 (3.02)	129.3 (5.09)	144.7 (5.70)	185.0 (7.28)	146.2 (5.76)	147.7 (5.81)	84.5 (3.33)	1,030.4 (40.57)
Average rainy days	0.8	0.3	0.8	1.3	4.2	5.2	7.1	8.0	8.7	8.1	7.4	4.0	56
Source: India Meteorological Department (record high and low up to 2010)

Another source with different averages:

Climate data for Pernambut
Month	Jan	Feb	Mar	Apr	May	Jun	Jul	Aug	Sep	Oct	Nov	Dec	Year
Mean daily maximum °C (°F)	29.2 (84.6)	31.1 (88.0)	35.3 (95.5)	38.2 (100.8)	39.0 (102.2)	36.1 (97.0)	34.5 (94.1)	33.7 (92.7)	33.1 (91.6)	31.2 (88.2)	29.1 (84.4)	28.0 (82.4)	33.2 (91.8)
Daily mean °C (°F)	23.0 (73.4)	24.2 (75.6)	27.5 (81.5)	30.0 (86.0)	31.2 (88.2)	29.8 (85.6)	28.4 (83.1)	28.0 (82.4)	27.2 (81.0)	26.1 (79.0)	24.8 (76.6)	23.5 (74.3)	27.0 (80.6)
Mean daily minimum °C (°F)	17.0 (62.6)	18.3 (64.9)	21.0 (69.8)	23.8 (74.8)	24.9 (76.8)	24.3 (75.7)	23.7 (74.7)	23.4 (74.1)	22.9 (73.2)	21.7 (71.1)	20.4 (68.7)	19.0 (66.2)	21.7 (71.1)
Average precipitation mm (inches)	9 (0.4)	5 (0.2)	12 (0.5)	24 (0.9)	66 (2.6)	77 (3.0)	129 (5.1)	145 (5.7)	185 (7.3)	146 (5.7)	148 (5.8)	85 (3.3)	1,031 (40.5)
Source: Climate-Data.org

== Economy and culture ==
The economy is dependent on the leather industries, glue factories, as well as beedi factories where many locals work. The town houses leather tanning and manufacturing facilities and is a leading cluster for the export of finished leather and leather-related products.

Pernambut is also known for its Unani medicine. Ramadan and Eid al-Adha festivals are celebrated by Muslims, Diwali and Pongal by Hindus, and Easter and Christmas by Christians.

Paddy, bananas, coconuts, groundnuts, corn, soya, and vegetables are cultivated here.

== Transport ==
The town has transport facilities in all directions, with major National Highways passing through Pernambut. NH 75 connects Mangalore, Bangalore, and Vellore. State Highways, major district roads, and village roads provide access to nearby important towns such as Ambur, Vaniyambadi, Gudiyatham, Pallikonda, and Vellore. It also connects to the metro cities of Chennai and Bangalore.

The nearest international airports are Chennai International Airport (190 km) and Bengaluru International Airport (180 km).

Distance between major towns and Pernambut:

S.No	Town/City	Distance (km)
1	Chennai	190
2	Bangalore	180
3	Hosur	142
4	Kuppam	68
5	Vellore	45
6	Vaniyambadi	32
7	V.Kota	36
8	Gudiyatham	18
9	Pallikonda	28
10	Oomerabad	10
11	Ambur	19
12	Delhi	2259
13	Jammu	2831
14	Agra	2028
15	Jaipur	2219
16	Kolkata	1755
17	Mumbai	1167
18	Kanyakumari	660
19	Ooty	412
20	Munnar	472
21	Mysore	351
