= Peranambattu block =

Revenue block of Vellore district of the Indian state of Tamil Nadu

Peranambattu block is a revenue block of Vellore district of the Indian state of Tamil Nadu. This revenue block consist of 51 panchayat villages.
