= List of educational institutions in Vellore =

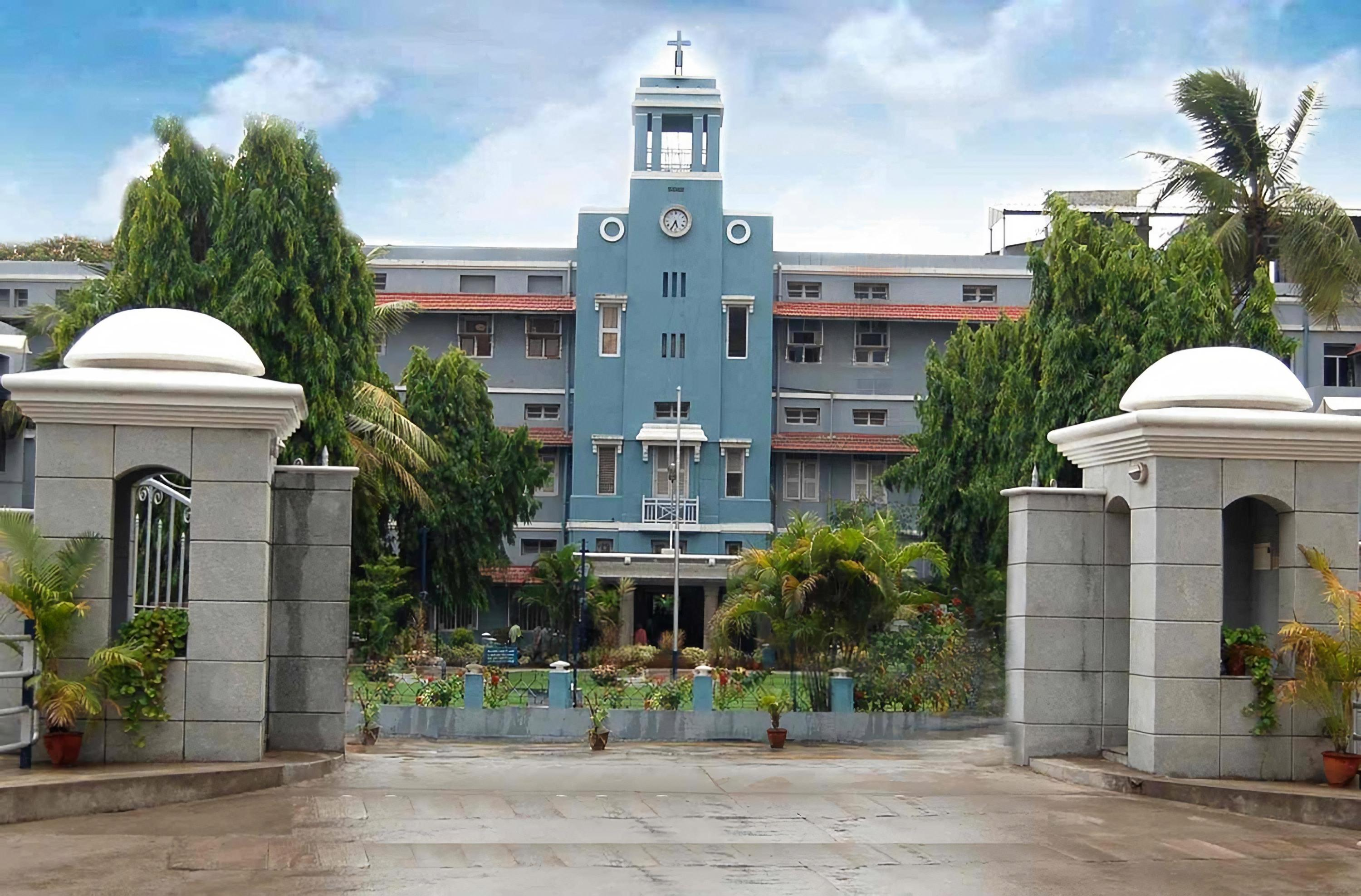
Christian Medical College Hospital

The following is a list of universities, colleges & schools in Vellore city and its suburbs.

== Universities ==
- Vellore Institute of Technology (VIT)
- Thiruvalluvar University

== Islamic Institutions ==
- Baqiyat Salihat Arabic College
- Madrasa e Rasheediya
- Madrasa e latifiya

== Medical colleges ==
- Christian Medical College and Hospital
- Government Vellore Medical College
- Sri Narayani College & School of Nursing
- Schieffelin Institute of Health – Research & Leprosy Centre
- Arun College of Nursing and Paramedical Sciences

== Engineering colleges ==
- Thanthai Periyar Government Institute of Technology
- Kingston Engineering College

== Arts and science colleges ==
- Voorhees College
- Muthurangam Govt. Arts College
- Auxilium College

== Law college ==
- Government Law College, Vellore

== Polytechnics ==
- Thanthai periyar E.V.Ramasamy Government Polytechnic
- Nettur Technical Training Foundation (NTTF), Katpadi
- Sri Venkateshwara Polytechnic College Adukambarai

== Industrial training institute ==
- Government I.T.I, Vellore
- Vellore Advanced Studies

== Schools ==
- Sunbeam Senior Secondary School
- Sunbeam Matric Higher Secondary School
- Shrishti Vidyashram Senior Secondary School
- Shrishti Matriculation Higher Secondary School.
- Williams Matriculation Higher Secondary School
- Spring days CBSE school
- Government Muslim Higher Secondary School
- EV Ramasamy Girls Higher Secondary School
- Ida Scudder School
- Lakshmi Garden Higher Secondary School
- Shri Vardhaman Jain Matric Higher Secondary School
- Sri Venkateswara Higher Secondary School
- Don Bosco Matric Higher Secondary school
