= Vellore taluk =

Vellore taluk is an administrative division (taluk) in Vellore district of the Indian state of Tamil Nadu. The headquarters of the taluk is the town of Vellore.

== Demographics ==
According to the 2011 census, the taluk of Vellore had a population of 686,422 with 339,464 males and 346,958 females. There were 1,022 women for every 1,000 men. The taluk had a literacy rate of 74.37%. Child population in the age group below 6 years were 35,059 Males and 33,359 Females.
