= Odugathur =

- Town
- Location in Tamil Nadu, India
- Coordinates: 12°46′00″N 78°54′00″E
- Country: India
- State: Tamil Nadu
- District: Vellore

Population (2011)
  - Total: 16,047

Languages
  - Official: Tamil
- Time zone: UTC+5:30 (IST)
- Postal code: 632 103

Odugathur is a panchayat town in the Vellore district in the Indian state of Tamil Nadu.

== Demographics ==
As of 2011, Odugathur had a population of 16,047. Males constitute 49% of the population and females 51%. Odugathur has an average literacy rate of 64%, higher than the national average of 59.5%: male literacy is 73%, and female literacy is 54%. In Odugathur, 11% of the population is under 6 years of age.
