= Kaniyambadi block =

The Kaniyambadi block is a revenue block in the Vellore district of Tamil Nadu, India. It has a total of 24 panchayat villages. Kaniyambadi is also included in the Vellore metropolitan area. This locality is a 20-minute drive from the Vellore Town bus terminus via Bagayam and Adukampaarai. It includes an engineering school called Ganathipathy Tulasis Engg College.
