= Gudiyattam block =

The Gudiyattam block is a revenue block in the Vellore district of Tamil Nadu, India. It has a total of 44 panchayat villages.
