= Thiruvalam =

Thiruvalam Thiruvallam Vellore-Ranipet Metropolitan Area
- neighbourhood
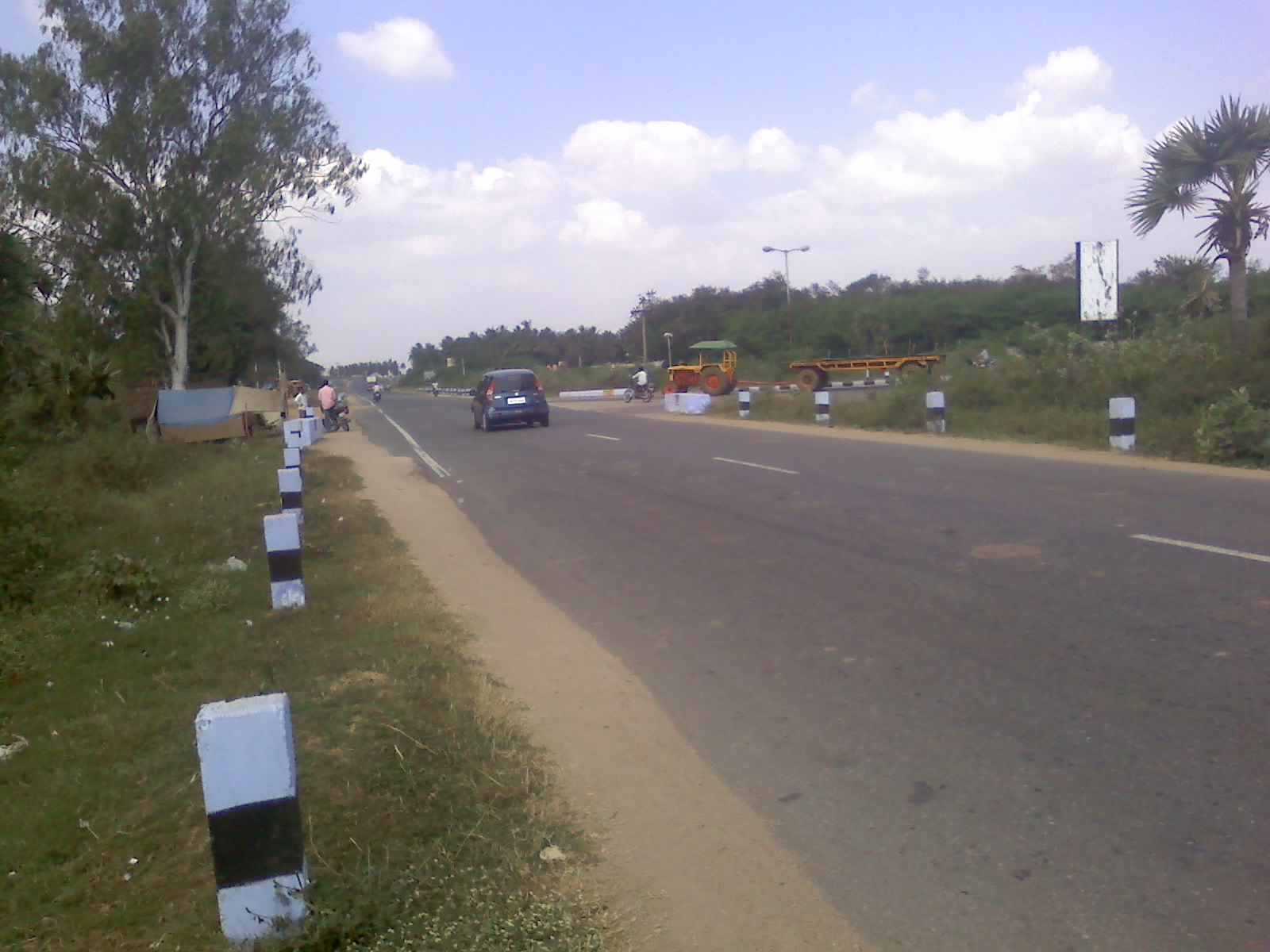
- Nh4 in Thiruvalam, Vellore district.

- Location in Tamil Nadu, India
- Coordinates: 12.974°N 79.194°E
- Country: India
- State: Tamil Nadu
- District: Vellore

Government
  - Body: Vellore Municipal Corporation
  - Mayor / Deputy Mayor: P. Karthiyayini / V.D. Dharumalingam

Population (2001)
  - Total: 7,945

Languages
  - Official: Tamil
- Time zone: UTC+5:30 (IST)
- PIN: 632515
- Telephone code: 416 2236xxx

Thiruvalam also known as Thiruvallam, an ancient Temple Town built around Sri Dhanurmadhyambigai Sametha Sri Vilavanadeeswarar Temple, is part of Vellore City.

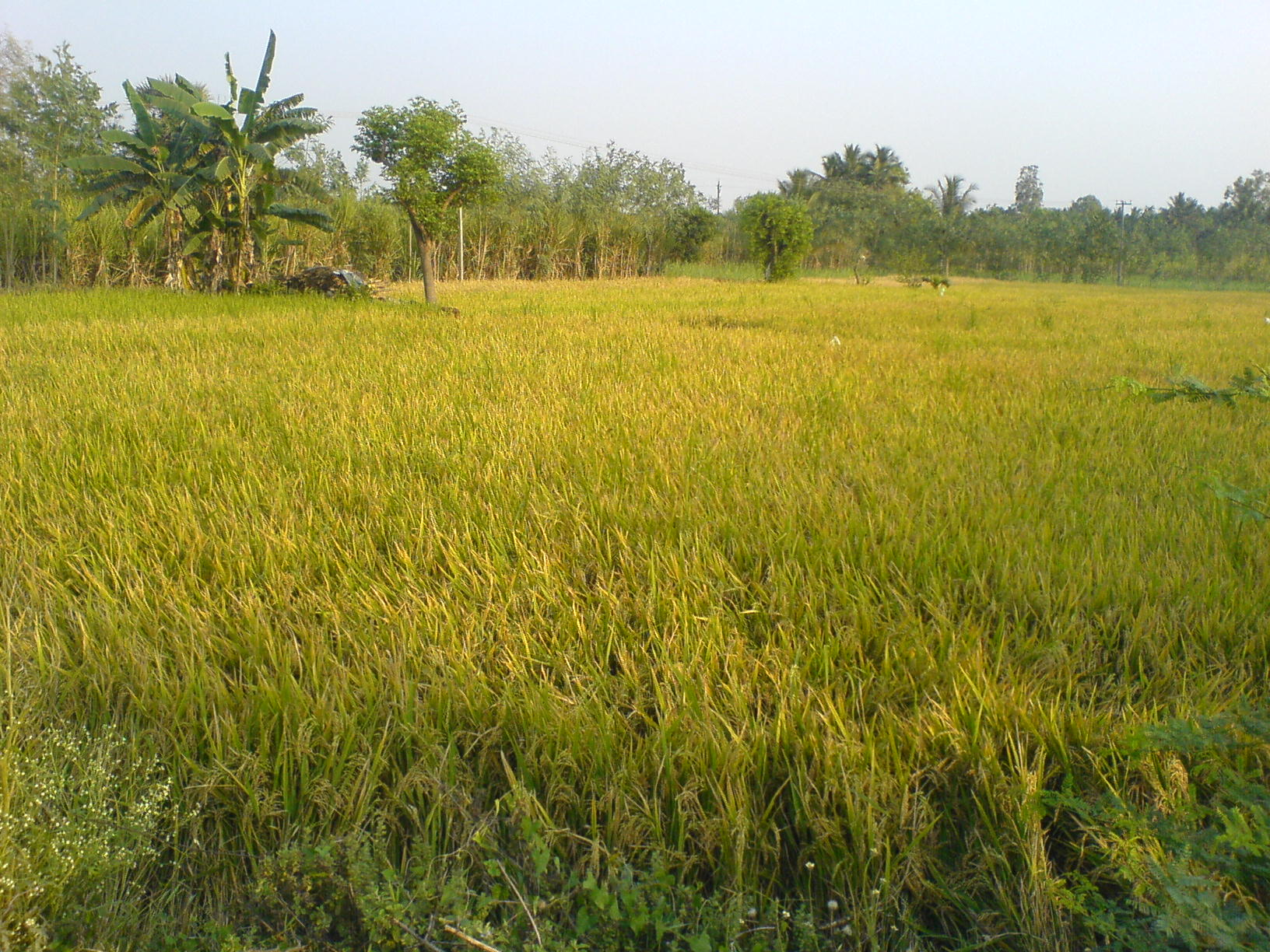
Thiruvalam in Vellore District

== Demographics ==
As of 2001 India census, Thiruvalam had a population of 7945. Males constitute 50% of the population and females 50%. Thiruvalam has an average literacy rate of 72%, higher than the national average of 59.5%: male literacy is 79%, and female literacy is 65%. In Thiruvalam, 11% of the population is under 6 years of age.

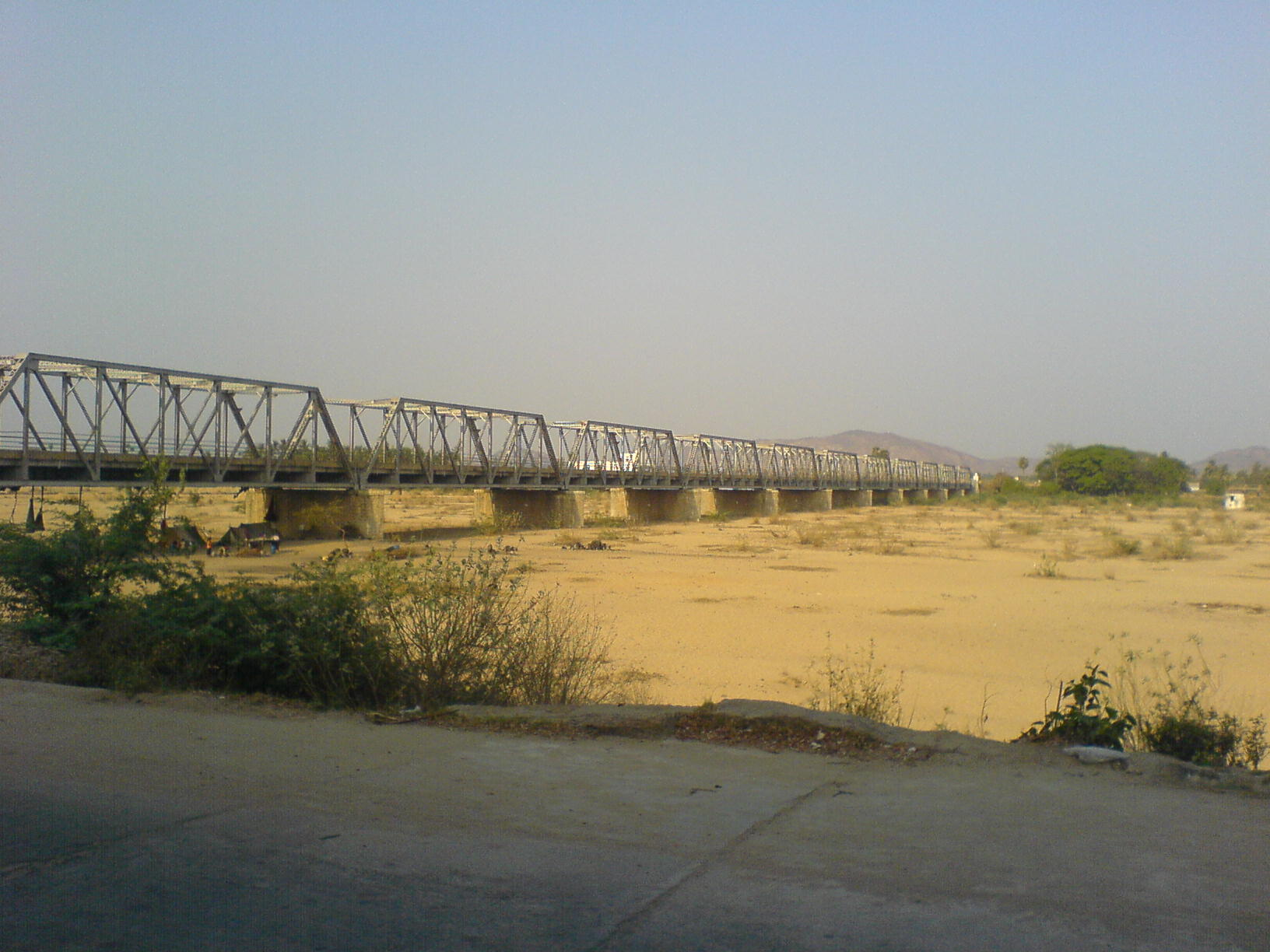
British period Ranipet-Thiruvalam bridge in across river Ponnai in Vellore district, Tamil Nadu

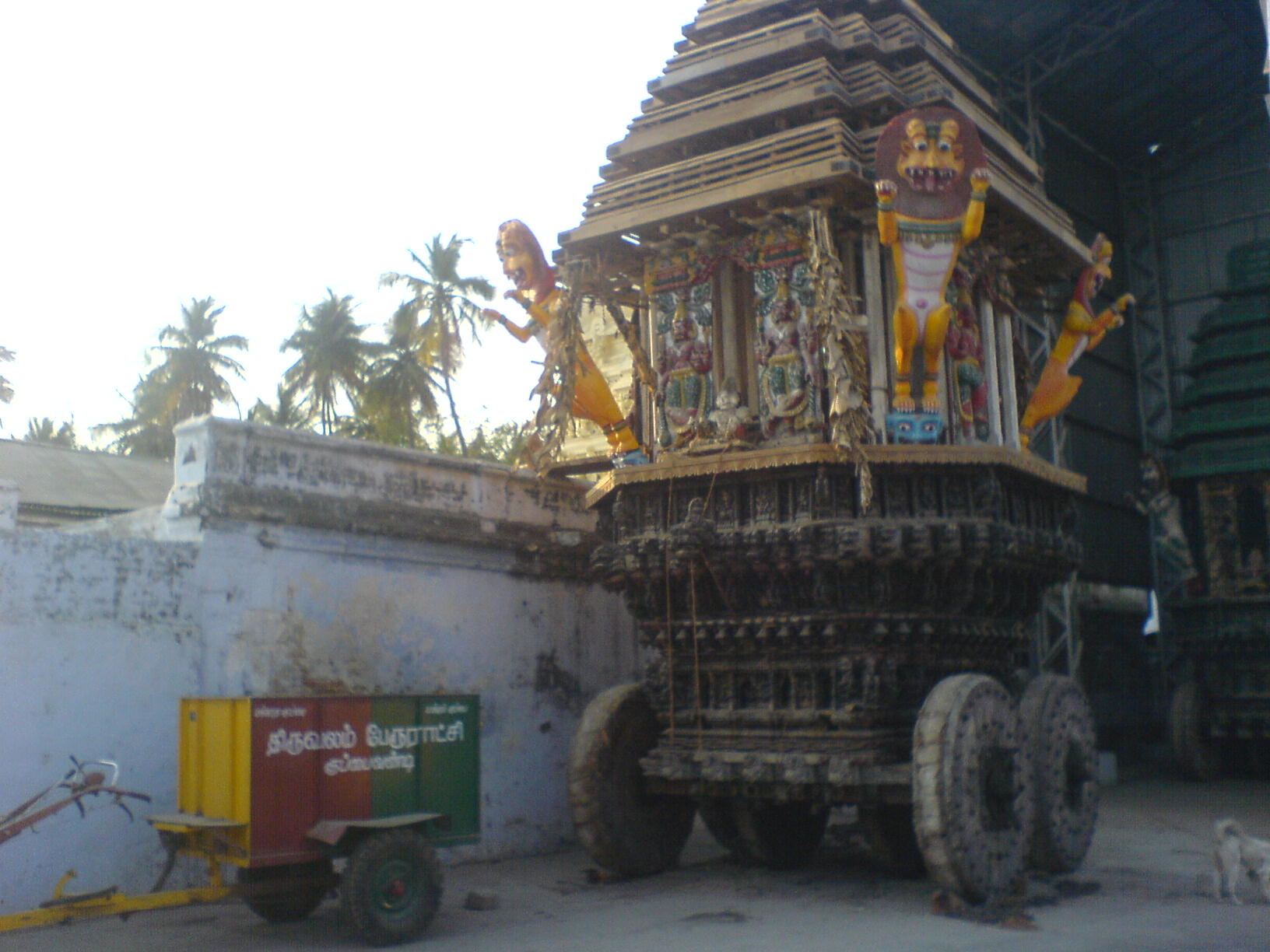
Temple chariot
