= Melpulam =

- village
- Interactive map of Melpulam
- Coordinates: 12°43′48″N 79°24′28″E
- Country: India
- State: Tamil Nadu
- District: Ranipet
- Taluk: Arcot

Languages
  - Official: Tamil
- Time zone: UTC+5:30 (IST)
- PIN: 632518
- Nearest city: Arcot
- Literacy: 78%
- Lok Sabha constituency: Arakkonam
- Climate: tropical (Köppen)

Melpulam is a small village near Kalavai, in Ranipet district of Tamil Nadu, one of the southern states of India.

== Demography ==
In 2011, the village had a recorded population of 4072.
