= Anaicut =

- Village Panchayat in vellore district
- Nickname: Suburban Vellore
- Location in Tamil Nadu, India
- Coordinates: 12°52′35″N 78°59′18″E
- Country: India
- State: Tamil Nadu
- District: Vellore

Government
  - Type: Anaicut
  - Body: Village Panchayat

Area
  - Total: 2.35 km^{2} (0.91 sq mi)

Population (2011)
  - Total: 6,138
  - Density: 2,610/km^{2} (6,760/sq mi)
- Time zone: UTC+5:30 (IST)
- PIN: 632101
- Telephone code: 91 - 0416762
- Vehicle registration: TN-23T
- Sex ratio: 1031 ♂/♀

Anaicut or Anaikattu is a village panchayat and taluk in Vellore district, Tamil Nadu, India. It is located 20 km from the Vellore city limit. The nearest large town is Pallikonda. The Anaicut Assembly constituency elects members to the Tamil Nadu Assembly.
