= Gudiyatham =

Town in Tamil Nadu, India

Gudiyatham Gudiyetram, Gudiyetranallur
- Town
- Gudiyattam
- Nickname: Vellore Suburbs
- Location in Tamil Nadu, India
- Coordinates: 12.93972°N 78.8644°E
- Country: India
- State: Tamil Nadu
- District: Vellore
- Founder: Kulothunga Cholan

Government
  - Type: First Grade Municipality (Sub District)
  - Body: Gudiyattam Municipality

Area
  - Total: 30.08 km^{2} (11.61 sq mi)
- Elevation: 270 m (890 ft)

Population (2011)
  - Total: 91,558
  - Density: 3,044/km^{2} (7,883/sq mi)

Languages = Tamil
  - Official: Tamil
- Time zone: UTC+5:30 (IST)
- Postal code: 632601, 632602, 632603, 632604, 635 803, 635806, 635805, 635813
- Telephone codes: +91 ,04171
- Vehicle registration: TN 23

Gudiyetram, commonly known as Gudiyattam (Tamil: [kuɖiyaːttam]; alternatively referred to as Gudiyatham), is a municipality situated in Vellore district within Tamil Nadu, India. The town is positioned between Bangalore and Chennai, with Vellore district located approximately 33 km from the town. According to the 2011 census, the town's population reached 235,672 residents. The municipality's name originates from the Tamil term 'Gudiye-tram,' which translates to "settlement of people." Historically, handloom weaving constituted the primary occupation of Gudiyatham's inhabitants.

== Etymology ==
Kulothunga Chola named the town "Jayamkonda Sathurvethi Mangalam". This was followed by rapid settlement of the town, so the town was renamed "Kudiyattrem", which metamorphosed into "Gudiyattam", to commemorate the influx. According to a myth, Karikala Cholan first cleared forest and then had people settle here, so it was named "Kudiyetram", which evolved into "Gudi-yetram". The supportive evidence for the myth is that the town is populated with one community who were of Chola kingdom. An inscription of 14th century found at Chenji (now in Cuddalore District) also reveals existence of the town in the name of “Gudi-yetram”. The passage of time and most probably British tongues changed the name to "Gudiyatham".

== History ==
The city was formerly created by Kulothunga Cholan by extending lands. He named it "Jayamkonda Sathurvethi Mangalam". After a few years, many people settled in the town. Archeological excavation shows that the town flourished during Chola rule. Many Roman wine vases and coins were found in the town's periphery. The town's existence is mentioned in the ancient inscription of Kulothunga Cholan's first regime in 1075 A.D. The temple of Kappuleeswarar existed during the period of the Kulothunkkan 1st dynasty. During the regime, the king had denoted 90 goats for maintenance and for purchase of oil for lighting. These inscriptions are found in the Kappuleeswarar temple Nandi Veeda inscription. The ancient temple was built at Nallore (Alias) Jayamkonda Sadurvedi Mangalam. The town was donated by the king, Kulothungan, following the victory in the Thondai Mandalam regions. The temple has been further modified and renovated by the Vijayanakara kings. The temple is a symbol of monuments of both Chola and Vijayanakara kingdoms.

Sri Lakshmaiyah Chetty was a pioneer in developing the town who established a cloth store in 1850 which mainly sold handloom products such as sarees and lungis. He also encouraged people to weave handloom products and he was the first to export handloom items to northern India and was the first to import Kasi .

== Geography ==
Gudiyatham is the largest municipality town in Vellore district, Gudiyatham is about 160 km west of Chennai and 165 km southeast of Bengaluru. The town is close to the border of Andhra Pradesh state. The following are the surrounding districts:

Chittoor district	38.9 km
Kolar district	97 km
Kanchipuram district	91.7 km
Tiruvannamalai district	91.8 km

=== Rivers ===
The Gowndanya Mahanadhi is a seasonal river which flows through the town's centre. Being a tributary of the river Palar, it also receives water and rejoins the Palar at Pallikonda. Mordhana dam and Rajathoppu check post were dams built across the river.

== Demographics ==
Religious census
	Percent(%)
Hindu	81.58%
Muslim	16.96%
Christian	0.98%
Sikh	0.01%
Buddhist	0.01%
Jain	0.28%
Other	0.16%
No religion	0.02%

According to the 2011 census, Gudiyatham had a population of 91,558 with a sex-ratio of 1,029 females for every 1,000 males, much above the national average of 929. A total of 9,273 were under the age of six, constituting 4,738 males and 4,535 females. Scheduled Castes and Scheduled Tribes accounted for 16.8% and 0.1% of the population, respectively.

The average literacy of the town was 77.46%, compared to the national average of 72.99%. The town had 55,103 households. There were 1,05,133 workers, comprising 9,700 cultivators, 25,373 main agricultural labourers, 6,501 in household industries, 40,891 other workers, 22,668 marginal workers, 877 marginal cultivators, 8,949 marginal agricultural labourers, 1,122 marginal workers in household industries and 11,369 other marginal workers.

As per the religious census of 2011, Gudiyatham had 81.58% Hindus, 16.96% Muslims, 0.98% Christians, 0.01% Sikhs, 0.01% Buddhists, 0.28% Jains, 0.16% following other religions and 0.02% following no religion or did not indicate any religious preference.

== Municipality ==
The Gudiyatham Municipality is the civic body that governs the town of Gudiyatham

=== Chronological List of Chairmen ===
- M.V. Bheemaraja
- M.V. Swaminatha
- T.A. Adhimula
- P.K. Gangadhara
- M.A.V. Duraisami
- M.A. Velayutha
- M.A. Govindaraj
- K.M. Govindaraja
- M.G. Amurthalinga
- A.K. Duraisami ex MLA & Chairman.
- Tamilarasu Vasudevan
- Thilagavathi Rajendran
- Puviyarasi
- Saran Gopi
- Soundarajan (from 2022)

== Politics ==
The Gudiyatham assembly constituency is part of Vellore Lok Sabha constituency. Kamarajar was elected as a Member of Legislative Assembly from the Gudiyatham constituency when he was the Chief Minister of Tamil Nadu.

== Economy ==
India's first national flag hoisted after Independence was woven in Gudiyattam. This flag was hoisted by the first prime minister Pandit Jawaharlal Nehru at Red Fort on 15 August 1947. In appreciation, the national leaders viz., Motilal Nehru and Sardar Vallabai Patel in their letter dated 12.08.1947 complimented the weavers.

Gudiyatham has small-scale manufacturing of safety matches, lungis, and beedis.The safety matches industry is the second-largest in Tamil Nadu after Sivakasi. Gudiyatham is nicknamed "The Little Sivakasi" because of its match-box factories. Beedis are exported to Pakistan and other parts of India. The handloom and powerloom lungies manufactured here are sold in India, Africa and Arab countries. The Middle East is supplied with handloom lungis by exporting firms in Gudiyatham. The major occupation of the nearby villages is agriculture. Sugar cane, paddy and other vegetables are cultivated here and transported to the nearby markets called Ulavar Santhai in Tamil in Gudiyattam.

Cattle and milk production are also important and most villagers are active in both agriculture and cattle-farming. For over a century, a cow and ox market has been held near Nellorepet every Tuesday.

The town has more than ten cinemas. Six of the theatres are near the Kamarajar bridge. Other theatres, Murugan and Raguram, are also in town. Gudiyatham is famous for producing gold jewellery. There are more than 50 jewellery shops in the town. Being on the Katpadi-Jolarpettai railway line, it is well connected to Chennai and Bengaluru. A cow and ox market has been held near Nellorepet every Tuesday for over a century.

== Cuisine ==
Gudiyattam's signature dishes include palkova, Sweet Samosa from Maharaja Sweets, and vegetarian and non-vegetarian dum biryani. The cuisine was introduced by the Nawabs of Arcot who once ruled the area.

The Ambur/Vaniyambadi biryani is accompanied with 'dhalcha,' a sour brinjal curry and pachadi or raita, which is made of sliced onions mixed with plain curd, tomato, chilies and salt. It has a distinctive aroma and is considered light on the stomach. The usage of spice is moderate and curd is used as a gravy base. It also has a higher ratio of meat to rice.

Palkova is a dairy sweet which is enriched with pure, thick milk without any added water. The only added sweetener is sugar. It is an eggless milk recipe. The palkova is also known as Milk Peda.

== Transportation ==
The municipality has two bus stations equipped to provide intra-town and inter-city routes. The nearest railway stations are in Gudiyatham and Ambur. The nearest railway junctions are Katpadi Junction and Chittore Junction (AP State). The nearest airports are in Vellore, Bengaluru and Chennai. The nearest seaport is Chennai.

=== Roads ===
In 2010, the opening of National Highway 75 (NH 75) highway was announced. NH75 passes through town on the way from Mangaluru to Villupuram en route to Vellore and Tiruvannamalai. The nearest highway junction is in Pallikonda.

== Tourism ==
The town of Gudiyattam has many temples.

The paintings of Pallava period are visible in the hills near Melmalaiyampattu village. The paintings of Jain statues were seen on the top of the naturally found cave structures. These artifacts were destroyed over a period of time and only their remains are there now. Dr. Nagasamy gives a detailed view of those monumental paintings in his “Oviya Paavai”. Yet the remains of the paintings of the 7th and 8th centuries alone can now be seen. The restored edifice of the Jain construction would be viewed right under the cave paintings. A few Paleolithic monuments are found nearby along with black and red pots and tiles in the nearby ash mound. The paintings portray scenes of a Jallikattu clash, a warrior fighting a leopard and a man riding a bullock cart. Archaeologists confirmed that the paintings were more than 5000 years old.

Karupuleeswarar Temple complex, also known as Balasarthuleeswarar (Baby-Tiger Eswarar) temple in Nellorepet is more than 1000 years old and is historically connected with Gudiyatham town. It is famous for its chariot festival Thaer Thiruvizha. This temple was the abode of the sage Goundanya Rishi and the river passing through the town, "Goundanya Maha Nadi", is named after him. The temple has a lion tank (Simha Kulam).

Errukampattu Sri Ranganathaswamy temple was built in the late 9th or early 10th century and is attributed to the god Vishnu consecrated Ranganatha Temple. The temple, which is surrounded by a wall with an imposing portal, differs from most Chola temples in the region by its almost geometric, but restored, gate and tower decor; it consists of a mandapa (a flat, covered porch) and a vimana (a stepped tower structure) with a transverse bearing. While the outer walls - apart from their pilasters - and niche structure are almost unadorned, there are numerous blind windows on the cornice fronts (kudus).
