= K. V. Kuppam block =

Taluk in Vellore district, Tamil Nadu, India

K.V.Kuppam block is a revenue block and Taluk of Vellore district of the Indian state of Tamil Nadu. This revenue block consists of 39 panchayat villages.
