= Katpadi taluk =

Coordinates: 12.98°N 79.13°E

Katpadi taluk is a taluk in Vellore district of the Indian state of Tamil Nadu. The headquarters of the taluk is the town of Katpadi.

== Demographics ==
According to the 2011 census, the taluk of Katpadi had a population of 387,922 with 193,853 males and 194,069 females. There were 1,001 women for every 1,000 men. The taluk had a literacy rate of 74.58%. Child population in the age group below 6 years was 18,402 boys and 17,728 girls.
