= Pallikonda =

- Town
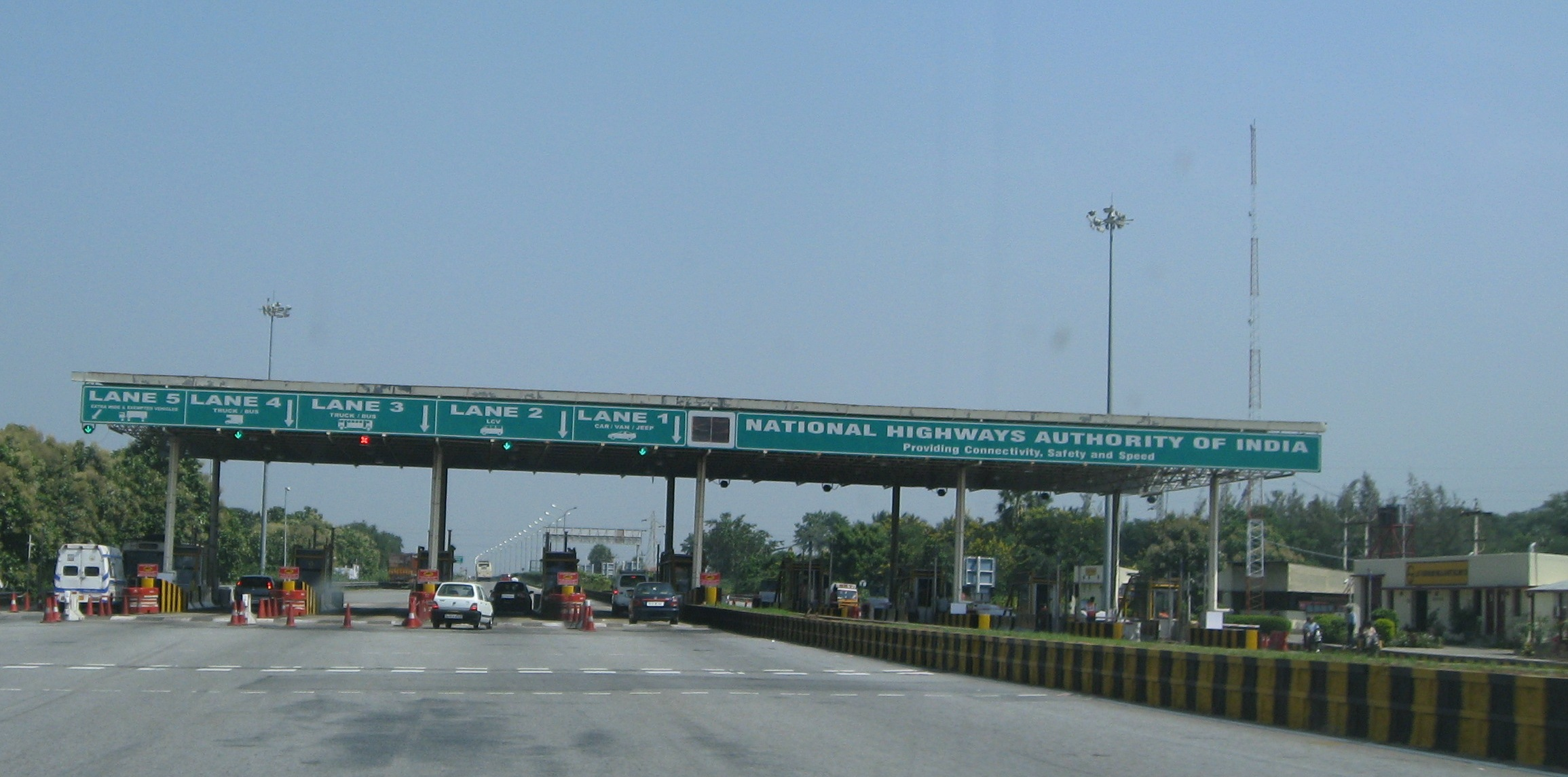
- Pallikonda Toll Plaza on NH 46

- Location in Tamil Nadu, India
- Coordinates: 12°55′00″N 78°56′00″E
- Country: India
- State: Tamil Nadu
- District: Vellore
- Named for: Ranganathaswamy temple

Government
  - Type: Pallikonda Selection Grade Town Panchayat

Area
  - Total: 19.2 km^{2} (7.4 sq mi)

Population (2011)
  - Total: 23,067
  - Density: 1,200/km^{2} (3,110/sq mi)
- Time zone: UTC+5:30 (IST)
- Postal code: 635809
- Vehicle registration: TN-23
- Website: townpanchayat.in/pallikonda

Pallikonda is a selection grade town panchayat in Vellore district in the Indian state of Tamil Nadu. It connects with 90 villages as well as the town of Gudiyatham.

== History ==
Pallikonda hosts a large non-sepulchral megalithic assembly with a vast capstone supported by three equally enormous boulders. The presence of the megalith was officially reported by Col. Congreve of the Madras Regiment in 1845 and was included in the book "Rude Stone Monuments" by J. Fergusson in 1872. The capstone projections are positioned so that they point towards north and south. The surface of the capstone is riddled with more than 75 cupules, built in clusters. Cupules of a large cluster form direct sight-lines to the position of the stars Vega and Capella during solstice sun rise and sunset.

The "Uttara Ranganathan" temple beside the Palar river bank has the deity "Anantashayana", the sleeping form of Vishnu. Since the deity lies north of the river Palar, it is termed as "Uttara" (North).

== Geography ==
Pallikonda experiences hot and dry weather throughout the year. The temperature ranges from a maximum of 43.5 °C (110.3 °F) to a minimum of 18.4 °C (65.1 °F). Like the rest of the state, April to June are the hottest months and December to January are the coldest. Pallikonda receives 996.7 mm (39.24 in) of rainfall every year. The southwest monsoon, with an onset in June and lasting up to August, brings scanty rainfall. The bulk of the rainfall is received during the northeast monsoon in October, November and December. The humidity ranges from 40%–63% during summer and 67%–86% during winter.

Climate data for Pallikonda
Month	Jan	Feb	Mar	Apr	May	Jun	Jul	Aug	Sep	Oct	Nov	Dec	Year
Record high °C (°F)	35.3 (95.5)	39.8 (103.6)	42.8 (109.0)	44.4 (111.9)	45.0 (113.0)	44.3 (111.7)	40.9 (105.6)	39.4 (102.9)	39.6 (103.3)	39.2 (102.6)	35.8 (96.4)	35.0 (95.0)	45.0 (113.0)
Mean daily maximum °C (°F)	29.2 (84.6)	32.0 (89.6)	35.0 (95.0)	37.1 (98.8)	38.5 (101.3)	36.3 (97.3)	34.6 (94.3)	34.0 (93.2)	34.0 (93.2)	33.0 (91.4)	29.5 (85.1)	28.3 (82.9)	33.5 (92.2)
Mean daily minimum °C (°F)	18.2 (64.8)	19.2 (66.6)	21.3 (70.3)	24.8 (76.6)	26.3 (79.3)	26.0 (78.8)	25.1 (77.2)	24.6 (76.3)	24.1 (75.4)	22.9 (73.2)	20.8 (69.4)	19.2 (66.6)	22.7 (72.9)
Record low °C (°F)	10.2 (50.4)	12.0 (53.6)	12.1 (53.8)	13.8 (56.8)	18.1 (64.6)	19.6 (67.3)	18.8 (65.8)	18.7 (65.7)	18.7 (65.7)	15.6 (60.1)	12.1 (53.8)	11.0 (51.8)	10.2 (50.4)
Average precipitation mm (inches)	9.0 (0.35)	7.1 (0.28)	5.9 (0.23)	21.8 (0.86)	83.9 (3.30)	71.0 (2.80)	117.0 (4.61)	124.9 (4.92)	149.6 (5.89)	176.9 (6.96)	155.2 (6.11)	78.6 (3.09)	1,000.9 (39.41)
Average precipitation days	0.8	0.5	0.4	1.3	4.7	5.3	6.6	7.8	7.6	9.4	7.7	3.9	56
Source: India Meteorological Department,

== Demographics ==
As of 2001 India census, Pallikonda had a population of 23,067. Males constitute 51% of the population and females 49%. Pallikonda has an average literacy rate of 73%, higher than the national average of 59.5%: male literacy is 80% and female literacy is 66%. In Pallikonda, 11% of the population is under 6 years of age.

== Transport ==
The town lies on the NH 46 of Bangalore-Chennai section which is part of the Golden Quadrilateral. A State Highway connects to Gudiyattam town[10 km]. The nearest railway station is Gudiyattam (6 km) on Chennai-Bangalore and Chennai-Coimbatore section of Southern Railway.
