= Vellore district =

- District of Tamil Nadu
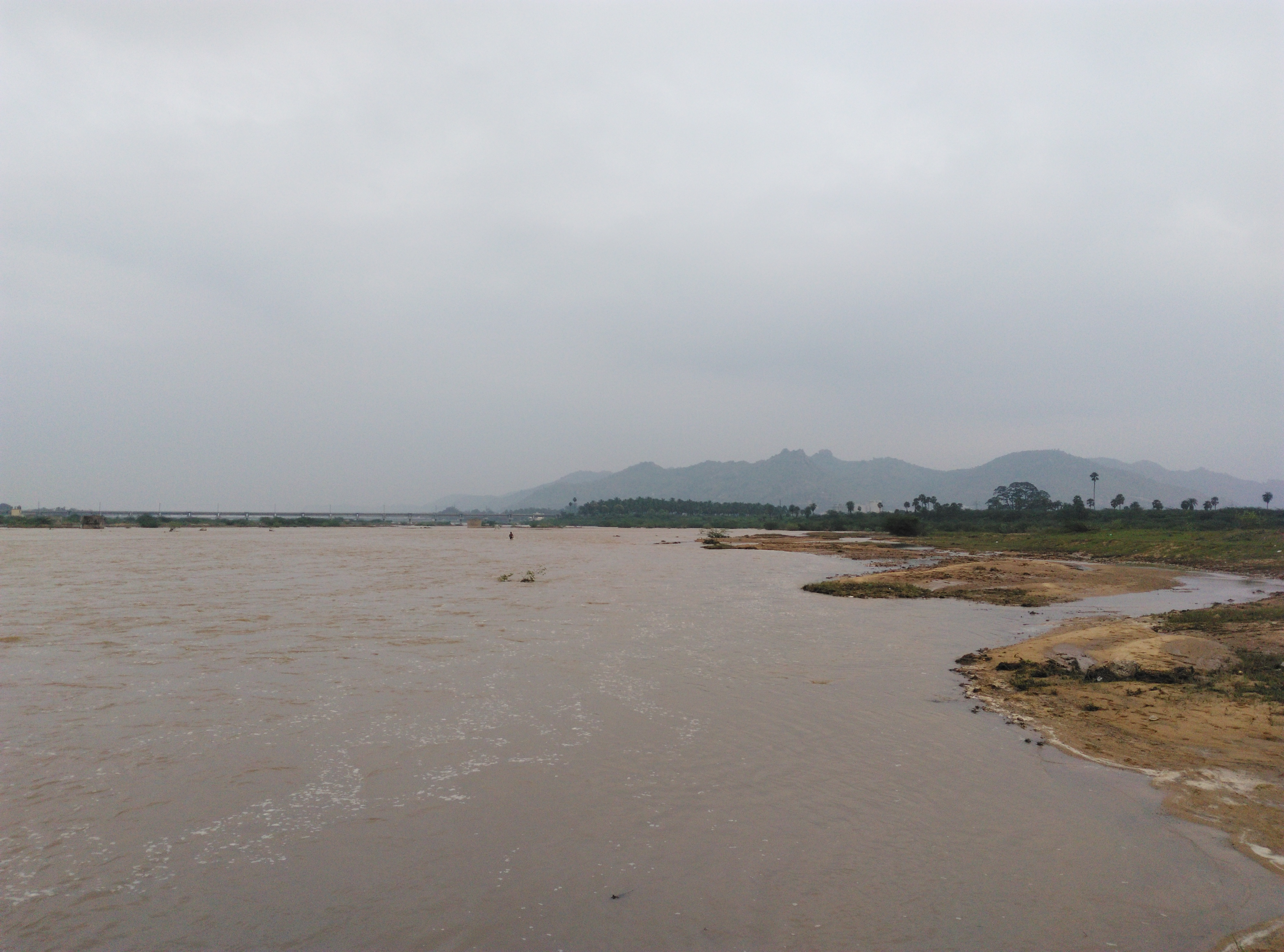
- Palar river near Vellore
- Nickname: Fort City
- Vellore district Location in Tamil Nadu
- Coordinates: 12°54′40″N 79°8′10″E
- Country: India
- State: Tamil Nadu
- Region: Vellore
- Established: 1996
- Headquarters: Vellore
- Talukas: Vellore, Anaicut, Katpadi, Gudiyatham, Pernambut, K.V Kuppam

Government
  - Collector & District Magistrate: P.S Leela Alex IAS
  - Superintendent of Police: N.U Sivaraman [I.P.S]
  - District Forest Officer: Ashok IFS

Area
  - Total: 2,030.11 km^{2} (783.83 sq mi)

Population (2011)
  - Total: 1,614,242
  - Density: 795.150/km^{2} (2,059.43/sq mi)

Languages
  - Official: Tamil
- Time zone: UTC+5:30 (IST)
- District Telephone codes: 0416,04171
- Vehicle registration: TN 23
- Coastline: 0 kilometres (0 mi)
- Largest city: Vellore
- Sex ratio: M-50.06%/F-49.94% ♂/♀
- Literacy: 79.65%
- Legislature type: elected
- Legislature Strength: 5
- Lok Sabha constituency: Vellore
- Precipitation: 917 millimetres (36.1 in)
- Avg. summer temperature: 39.5 °C (103.1 °F)
- Avg. winter temperature: 15.6 °C (60.1 °F)
- Website: District

Vellore district (Tamil: [ʋeːluːɾ]) is one of the 38 districts in the Tamil Nadu state of India. It is one of the eleven districts that form the north region of Tamil Nadu. Vellore city is the headquarters of this district. As of 2011, the district had a population of 1,614,242 with a sex ratio of 1,007 females for every 1,000 males. In 2017 Vellore district ranked eleventh in list of districts in Tamil Nadu by Human Development Index.

The Government of India recently included Vellore city in its prestigious smart city project, along with 26 other cities.

== History ==
Vellore district's trifurcation into Tirupattur (left) and Ranipet (right)

Men from the Vellore District fought in the British India Army and sacrificed their lives in the World Wars. This is recorded in the clock tower in the long bazaar at Vellore, raised in 1920, where an inscription reads "Vellore – From this Village 277 men went to the Great war 1914–18, of them 14 gave up their lives".

On 30 September 1989 the district was again split into Tiruvannamalai-Sambuvarayar (present-day Tiruvannamalai) and North Arcot Ambedkar districts. North Arcot Ambedkar District was renamed Vellore District in 1996.

On 15 August 2019, the district was trifurcated into Vellore, Tirupattur and Ranipet districts.

== Demographics ==
Historical population
Year	Pop.	±% p.a.
1901	967,845	—
1911	1,057,841	+0.89%
1921	1,088,264	+0.28%
1931	1,228,535	+1.22%
1941	1,440,228	+1.60%
1951	1,676,438	+1.53%
1961	1,817,967	+0.81%
1971	2,231,448	+2.07%
1981	2,628,526	+1.65%
1991	3,026,432	+1.42%
2001	3,477,317	+1.40%
2011	3,936,331	+1.25%
2011 (after trifurcation)	1,614,242	−100.00%

According to 2011 census, Vellore district had a population of 1,614,242 with a sex ratio of 1,007 females for every 1,000 males, much above the national average of 929. A total of 432,550 were under the age of six, constituting 222,460 males and 210,090 females. Scheduled Castes and Scheduled Tribes accounted for 21.85% and 1.85% of the population, respectively. The average literacy of the district was 70.47%, compared to the national average of 72.99%.

The district had 929,281 households. There were 1,689,330 workers, comprising 153,211 cultivators, 254,999 main agricultural labourers, 106,906 in household industries, 845,069 other workers, 329,145 marginal workers, 21,897 marginal cultivators, 136,956 marginal agricultural labourers, 29,509 marginal workers in household industries and 140,783 other marginal workers.

== Politics ==
District	No.	Constituency	Name	Party	Alliance	Remarks
Vellore	40	Katpadi	M. Sudhakar	TVK	SSJVA	
Vellore	43	Vellore	M. M. Vinoth Kannan	TVK	TVK+	
Vellore	44	Anaicut	D. Velazhagan	AIADMK	NDA	Opposed TVK
Vellore	45	Kilvaithinankuppam (SC)	E. Thenral Kumar	TVK	TVK+	
Vellore	46	Gudiyatham (SC)	K. Sindhu	TVK	TVK+	

== Administrative divisions ==
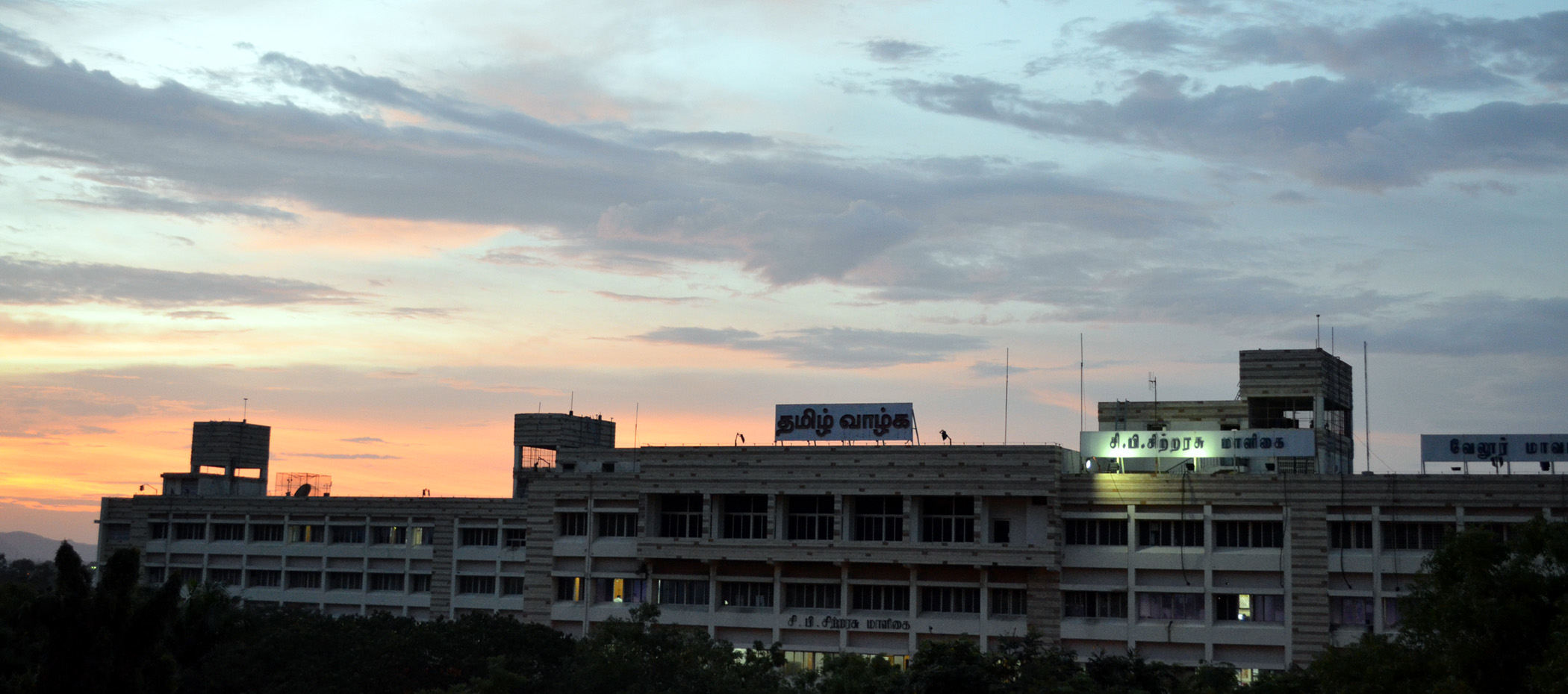
Vellore District Collectorate

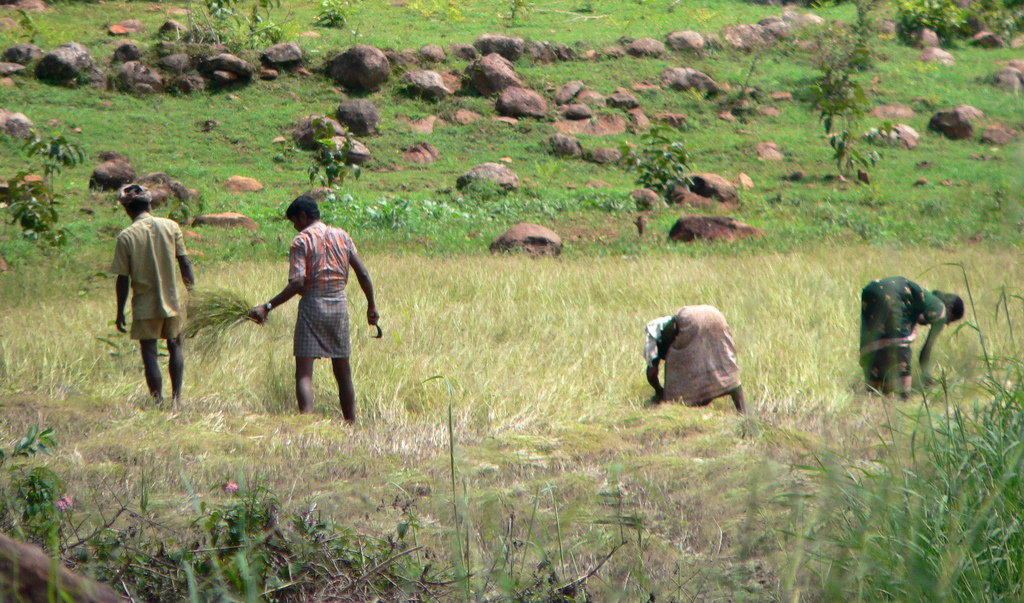
Farmers harvesting paddy near Vellore

Vellore is one of the 38 districts of Tamil Nadu and is administered by the Vellore District Collectorate. The present collector of Vellore district V.R.Subbulaxmi IAS.

=== Revenue Divisions and Taluks ===
Vellore Revenue Division: Vellore, Katpadi, Anaicut

Gudiyattam Revenue Division: Gudiyattam, Pernambut, K. V. Kuppam

Proposed Taluk: Kaniyambadi

=== Municipal Corporation ===
1. Vellore Municipal Corporation

=== Municipalities ===
1. Gudiyattam
2. Peranambattu

Proposed Municipalities: Pallikonda

=== Town Panchayats ===
1. Thiruvalam
2. Pallikonda
3. Odugathur
4. Pennathur

Proposed Town Panchayats: Anaicut, K. V. Kuppam, Sevur, Kaniyambadi, Kondasamudram, Vinnampalli

=== Panchayat Unions / Blocks ===
1. Anaicut
2. Vellore
3. Kaniyambadi
4. Katpadi
5. Kilvaithinankuppam
6. Gudiyattam
7. Peranambattu

=== Villages ===
1. Krishnampalli
2. Melpulam
3. Sembedu

== Transportation ==
Two National Highways — NH 4 (Mumbai – Chennai) and NH 46 (Krishnagiri – Ranipet) — used to connect parts of the district to other parts of the country before renumbering of national highways in 2010. The former NH 4 and NH 46 is now renumbered as NH 48.

These highways are important connecting roads for vehicles especially travelling to Chennai from Bangalore and Coimbatore. These highways run for 226 km (140 mi) in the district. Other important roadways present are State Highways of 629 km (391 mi) and district roads of 1,947 km (1,210 mi).

Railway network in Vellore district comes under the Southern Railways, with Vellore Katpadi Junction, Vellore Cantonment Junction and Gudiyatham forming the major railway junctions. There are many small railway stations for the passenger and local train stops. There is a domestic airport which is not in use; the nearest international/domestic airport is located at Chennai.

== Tourism ==
The Vellore Fort is the primary tourist attraction in the district headquarters Vellore. Vellore Fort is the most prominent landmark. During British rule, Tipu Sultan's family and the last king of Sri Lanka, Vikrama Rajasinha, were held as royal prisoners in the fort. It houses a church, a mosque and a Hindu temple, the latter known for its carvings. The first rebellion against British rule erupted at this fort in 1806, and it witnessed the massacre of the Vijayanagara royal family of Emperor Sriranga Raya.

The Golden Temple Vellore of Sripuram (Tamil: ஸ்ரீபுரம்) is a spiritual park situated at the foot of a small range of green hills in a place known as "Malaikodi". The temple is between Vellore-Odugathur state highway and at the southern end of the city of Vellore, at Tirumalaikodi. The temple with gold covering, has intricate work done by artisans specializing in temple art using gold.

Yelagiri is a hill station located in Tirupattur district of the Vaniyambadi-Tirupattur road at an altitude of 1,410.6 metres above mean sea level and spread across 30 km^{2}.

== Cuisine ==
Ambur briyani is very famous in vellore (Made of seeraga samba rice and not with basmati rice).

Makkan Peda is considered to be popular sweet in Vellore.

== Geographical indication ==
Vellore Spiny brinjal was awarded the Geographical Indication (GI) status tag from the Geographical Indications Registry, under the Union Government of India, on 22 February 2023 and is valid until 28 October 2031.

South India Multi State Agriculture Cooperative Society Limited from Vellore, proposed the GI registration of Vellore Spiny brinjal. After filing the application in October 2021, the Brinjal was granted the GI tag in 2023 by the Geographical Indication Registry in Chennai, making the name "Vellore Spiny brinjal" exclusive to the Brinjal grown in the region. It thus became the first brinjal variety from Tamil Nadu and the 46th type of goods from Tamil Nadu to earn the GI tag.

The GI tag protects the brinjal from illegal selling and marketing, and gives it legal protection and a unique identity.

== See also ==
- Economy of Vellore
- List of educational institutions in Vellore
- List of districts of Tamil Nadu
- Thuthipattu
