= Economy of Vellore =

Vellore, located in Tamil Nadu, India, has a diversified economy, primarily based in leather processing, shoe manufacturing, automobile assembly, precision tool milling, explosive materials production, and the service industry.

The SIDCO and SIPCOT industrial parks, all vital in the Vellore economy, are located in Katpadi, Ranipet, Mukundarayapuram, Vannivedu, and Arakkonam. Clusters of leather factories are located in Ambur, Melvisharam, Vaniyambadi, and Ranipet.

Organisations like Christian Medical College & Hospital (CMCH)., Vellore Institute of Technology (VIT), Sri Narayani Hospital & Research Centre and Naruvi Hospitals have been a catalyst in bringing about major economical and infrastructural delevelopment in the region.

Future developments include an electronics manufacturing cluster (EMC) and leather and information technology special economic zones.

== Industrial Parks and Clusters ==
=== SIDCO ===
Tamil Nadu Small Industries Development Corporation, an undertaking of the government of Tamil Nadu, popularly known as SIDCO, was formed in 1972 to develop Tamil Nadu's industrial estates. This is a list of SIDCO installations in the Vellore region.

| No. | Location | Area (in acres) |
|---|---|---|
| 1 | SIDCO-Katpadi | 19.480 |
| 2 | SIDCO-Ranipet | 113.44 |
| 3 | SIDCO-BHEL | 86.195 |
| 4 | SIDCO-Vannivedu | 16.44 |
| 5 | SIDCO-Arakkonam | 56.240 |

=== SIPCOT ===
The State Industries Promotion Corporation of Tamil Nadu Limited (SIPCOT), was formed in 1971 to promote industrial growth in the state and to advance term loans to medium and large industries. The SIPCOT Industrial Complex, Ranipet Phase I, is located at Mukundarayapuram. Phase II & III are spread over an area of 730 acres and are located in Ranipet.

=== Leather Industry ===
Hundreds of leather and tannery facilities lie in and around Vellore, including nearby towns such as Ranipet, Ambur and Vaniyambadi. The Vellore district is one of the top exporters of processed leather goods in the country. Vellore leather accounts for more than 37% of the country's exports of leather and leather-related products (such as finished leathers, shoes, garments and gloves).

=== Electronics Manufacturing Clusters (EMC) ===
On 18 January 2014, the Brownfield Electronics Manufacturing Cluster (EMC) cluster was approved, making Vellore the first region in Tamil Nadu to develop such a cluster.

=== IT SEZ (Information Technology Special Economic Zone) ===
As per the policy directive of the Government of Tamil Nadu, ELCOT (Electronics Corporation of Tamil Nadu Limited) promotes IT Parks in Tier I and Tier II cities. Integrated information technology campuses consist of IT buildings as well as residential and social infrastructure facilities. These campuses are established with a Public-Private Partnership (PPP) in Vellore and other Tier II Cities. In December 2012, the then Chief Minister Jayalalithaa announced a feasibility study to build an IT park in Vellore.

== Industries ==
=== Leather industries ===
The leather industry of the region contributes forms a major share of India's overall leather exports. There are several major leather factories located in Tamil Nadu, notably:

| Company | Year & Founder | Plants/Factories | Employment |
|---|---|---|---|
| FARIDA Group | 1957 by Haji Mecca Abdul Majid Sahib | 12 | 7000+ |
| KH Group | 1982 by Khizar Hussain | 4 | 7000 |
| TAW | 1949 by T. Abdul Wahid & Co | 3 | 3400 |
| NMZ | 1972 by N M Zackriah | 5 | 1800 |
| Florence | 1979 by Aqueel Ahmed | 10 | NA |

Other major factories include Althaf Shoes, Bachi Shoes, Florind Shoes, IRBAZ Group, TMAR Group, Nibras Shoes and the SSC.

=== Automobile industries ===
Vellore has manufacturing units of international automobile and mechanical brands like SAME Deutz-Fahr, TVS-Brakes India, Mitsubishi, Greaves Cotton and MRF.

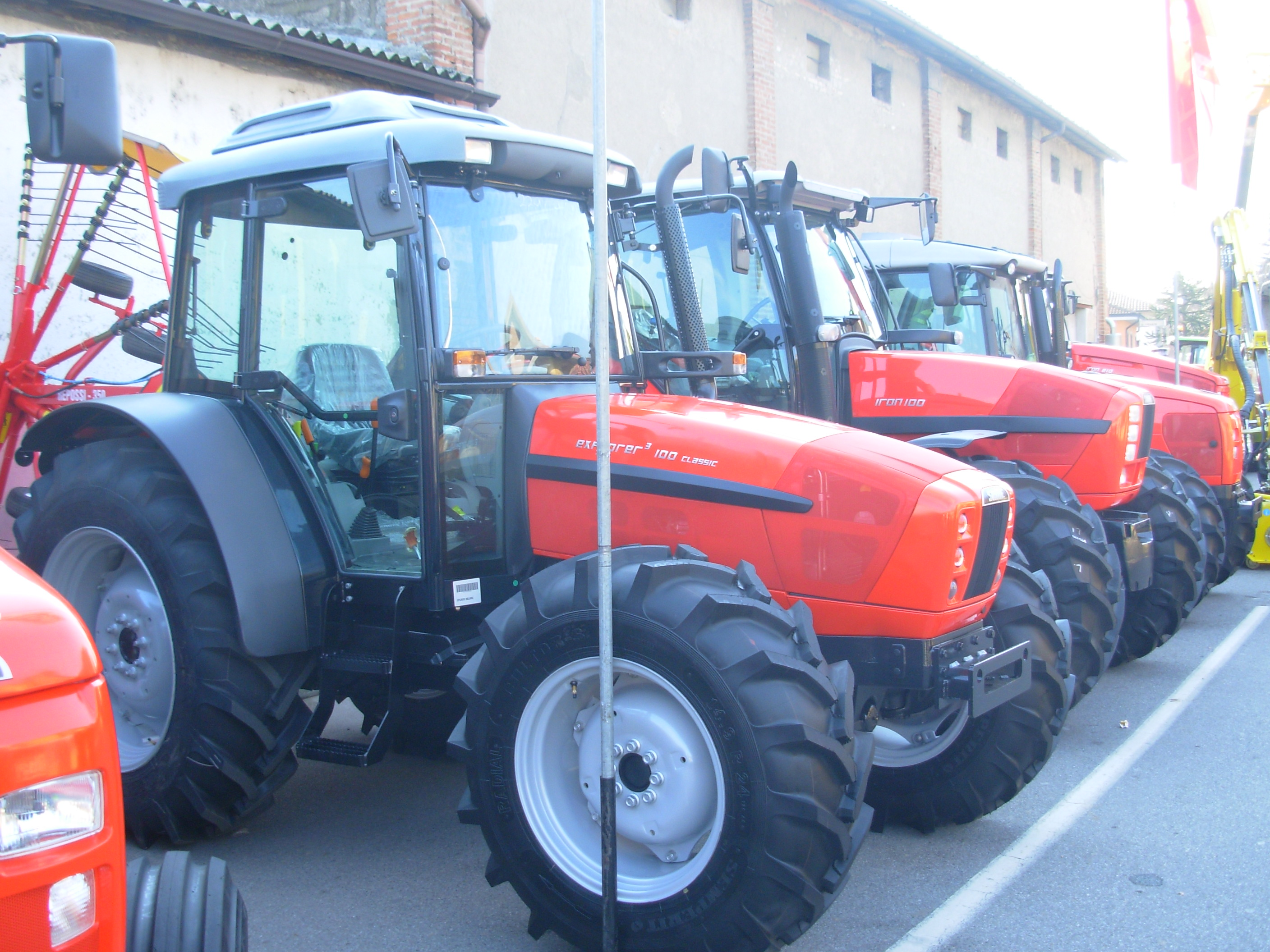
SAME Deutz-Fahr tractors

- SAME Deutz-Fahr India, part of the SAME Deutz-Fahr group of Italy, has their plant in Ranipet, Vellore. Manufacturers of tractors, engines, and agricultural machinery entered India in 2005 with an initial investment of INR 88 crores. It exports tractors in the range of 35-70 HP as well as components for engines and transmission. Production capacity was 6,300 tractors per annum in the year 2009. In 2008, the company exported 1,500 units to the US and Europe and set a target to double the figure the following year. The facility caters to markets in Sri Lanka, Bangladesh, and African countries. SAME Deutz-Fahr (SDF) India Group is planning to introduce the premium brand, Lamborghini, tractors in India. The group is also planning to make India its global production hub for engines and will move its global tractor engine production from Italy and Germany to the plant of its Indian arm, Same Deutz-Fahr India at Ranipet, Vellore. SAME Deutz-Fahr is planning to expand its production base in this plant. The plan is to get to 30-35 HP at the lower end and 80-100 HP at the upper range. Currently, the production capacity of this plant is 15,000 tractors per year, with plans to further increase this capacity.
- Greaves Cotton, part of the Thapar Group, manufacture automotive engine (diesel and petrol engines for three- and four-wheelers), construction equipment gensets and farm equipment has their manufacturing unit at Ranipet, Vellore. Greaves Cotton and are planning to expand their construction equipment product range. This 1,700-crore multi-product company has signed a pact with Samil of South Korea seeking technical know-how for products such as stationary concrete pumps and boom pumps. The company is also planning to expand its diesel engine manufacturing capacity at this plant.
- Bavina Cars India Limited, has been allotted a 100-acre plot at Ranipet SIPCOT's SEZ for its hybrid electric car manufacturing facility at an investment of 300 crores with a capacity to produce 40,000 cars per year with technology support from Velozzi of the United States. This will be the second battery-powered car production unit in the country after Bangalore's Reva Electric Car. There are reports that this project has been on hold due to financial issues of the firm.

=== Engineering & manufacturing industries ===
Bharat Heavy Electricals Limited (BHEL), is an Indian state-owned integrated power plant equipment manufacturing company. Its Boiler Auxiliaries Plant (BAP) is located in Ranipet, Vellore. BHEL Ranipet has performed exceedingly well according to its executive director, as it has won the 'Best Productive Unit' trophy from among all the units of BHEL in 2012. This plant has clocked a turnover of 4,210 crores, with shop production crossing the 1 lakh tonne benchmark, also registering a profit before tax of 1,260 crores for the 2012 financial year. It has so far obtained 21 patents and 46 copyrights.

BHEL-Boiler Auxiliaries Plant, Ranipet is installing a 5 MW solar power plant which will cover the entire energy needs of the plant, also entering into an agreement with Mitsubishi Heavy Industries, Japan to manufacture and supply a flue gas desulphurisation system meant for removal of sulphur dioxide from flue gases.

ArcelorMittal Dhamm Processing Private Limited is a joint venture firm between the world's largest steel producing firm ArcelorMittal and Mumbai based Dhamm Steel for manufacturing steel components at an estimated cost of 100-crores at Ranipet, Vellore. It manufactures finished steel components for earth moving equipment manufacturers, construction and power industries.

- MRF Limited (Madras Rubber Factory limited) is an India-based company engaged in manufacturing, distribution and sale of tires for various kinds of vehicles ranging from helicopters to automobiles is located at Arakkonam, Ranipet.

=== Precision tool industries ===
- Mitsubishi Heavy Industries India Precision Tools Limited (MHI-IPT), a subsidiary of Mitsubishi Heavy Industries, opened its plant in Ranipet, Vellore in 2007, doubling its production capacity in gear cutting tools. Products manufactured by MHI-IPT at this plant are Hobs, Shaping cutters, Gear Shaving cutters, Master Gears, Broaches and Rotary cutter.
- KRAMSKI Stamping and Molding India Pvt Ltd, a subsidiary of KRAMSKI GmbH headquartered in Pforzheim, Germany, produces precision metal and plastic integrated-component manufacturing company with automotive, telecommunications, electronics and medical applications is located on a 10-acre site at Erayankadu, about 16 km from the Vellore city on the Chennai-Bangalore National Highway, established at the cost of Rs.15 crore which is the lone Indian plant of this Germany based firm. KRAMSKI, which has currently located its office in the Vellore Institute of Technology-Technology Business Incubator (VIT-TBI), has signed a Memorandum of Understanding with the VIT-TBI for soft launching of the company in Vellore. This plant being one among the two plants in Asia from KRAMSKI GmbH was inaugurated by Vellore Collector in the year 2009.

KRAMSKI Stamping and Molding India Pvt Ltd a leading manufacturer of electronic components has won two ELCINA-EFY (Electronic Industries Association of India-Electronics For You) awards. One award for being the Outstanding Electronics SME (Small and Medium Enterprise) of the Year Special Jury Award for its achievements by an Electronics SME in India in the medium company category for the year 2012–13, and the second prize in Excellence in Environment Management under the SME category (for a medium company) another award for the same year.

- TVS-Brakes India Sholingur's foundry division is located at Ranipet-Sholingur to manufacture Permanent Mold Grey Iron castings with an installed capacity of 5,000 MTPA which later increased to 26,000 MTPA in the year 2005.

=== Explosives industries ===
- Tamil Nadu Industrial Explosives Limited (TNIE) is Asia's biggest explosives manufacturing company, located at Katpadi, Vellore. This is India's only government controlled explosives company. The company is headed by a senior Indian Administrative Service officer.

=== Service sector industries ===
Vellore is among the top medical destinations in the country due to the presence of the Christian Medical College & Hospital (CMCH). CMCH is located on Ida Scudder Road in the heart of the city and is Vellore's largest private employer, with a large floating population from other parts of India and abroad. The Government Vellore Medical College and Hospital (VMCH) is located at Adukamparai in Vellore. With the advent of hospitals such as Apollo KH Hospital in Melvisharam and Sri Narayani Hospital & Research Centre in Sripuram, medical tourism is rapidly growing.

'Naruvi Hospitals' is being built at a cost of 3300 million INR, a joint venture between vellore based 'Pearl Human Care' and Detroit-based Henry Ford Health System.

A new venture of Sri Narayani Hospital & Research Centre (SNHRC) in Sripuram, Vellore, located in a swanky complex, Sri Narayani Aayurvedic Centre, was inaugurated by Union Minister of State for AYUSH Shripad Yesso Naik in August 2019.

Vellore Institute of Technology (VIT) is one of the major demand generators in the Vellore district and a primary catalyst for the urban growth of Katpadi. With roughly 38,000 students—including more than 30,000 annual hostel residents across 32 blocks—alongside parents, faculty, recruiters, and visitors, VIT sustains a massive, concentrated consumer market. The Tamil Nadu Katpadi City Corporate Plan identifies VIT, together with Katpadi Junction, as a key nodal point in the region's development.

Scale, Consumer Market & Business Linkages

The continuous influx of students and visitors creates steady demand for housing, food, transport, retail, and personal services. This activity spikes during admissions, examinations, placements, and major campus fests like Riviera and Gravitas.

- Traditional Sectors: The surrounding economy thrives on PGs, apartments, hotels, restaurants, bakeries, laundries, supermarkets, and local transport (autos, taxis, and shuttles).
- New-Age Digital Commerce: The dense student and patients belt within 3 kms of these institutes have driven the success of quick-commerce platforms—such as Blinkit, Zepto, Swiggy Instamart, and Flipkart Minutes—fueled by frequent, small-basket orders (Rs. 120–Rs. 220) during evenings and late nights, alongside cloud kitchens and fintech services.

Employment, Public Revenue & District Context

- Employment & Incomes: Institutes like VIT, CMC & SNHRC create direct jobs and a wide array of indirect jobs in retail, hospitality, delivery, and real estate, offering stable non-agricultural incomes for local households.
- Public Revenues: Economic activity drives state and central GST (food, retail, hotels, transport) and income taxes, while broadening municipal property and professional tax bases (subject to local compliance and collection efficiency).
- Wider Economic Impact: Vellore’s economy spans leather, manufacturing, agriculture, R&D and healthcare. With Vellore’s per-capita income (Rs. 2.42 lakh per annum) trailing Tamil Nadu’s average (Rs. 3.62 lakh), institutes like VIT also contribute by helping bridge the gap by fostering skilled talent, start-ups, and service-sector growth, supporting Tamil Nadu’s vision of a US$1.5 trillion economy.
