= Kirupanandha Variyar =

Shaivite spiritual teacher (1906–1993)

Isai Perarignar Kirubanandha Variyar
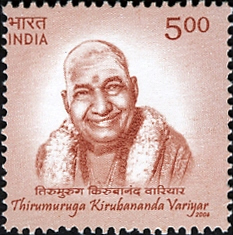
- Kirupanandha Variyar on a 2006 stamp of India
- Born: 25 August 1906; Kangeyanallur, North Arcot District, Madras Presidency, British India (now Vellore district, Tamil Nadu, India)
- Died: 7 November 1993 (aged 87); Airspace between Tirupati, Andhra Pradesh and Tiruttani, Tamil Nadu, India
- Other names: Variyar Swamigal, 64th nayanmar
- Parent(s): Father : Mallayadasan; Mother : Kanagavalli

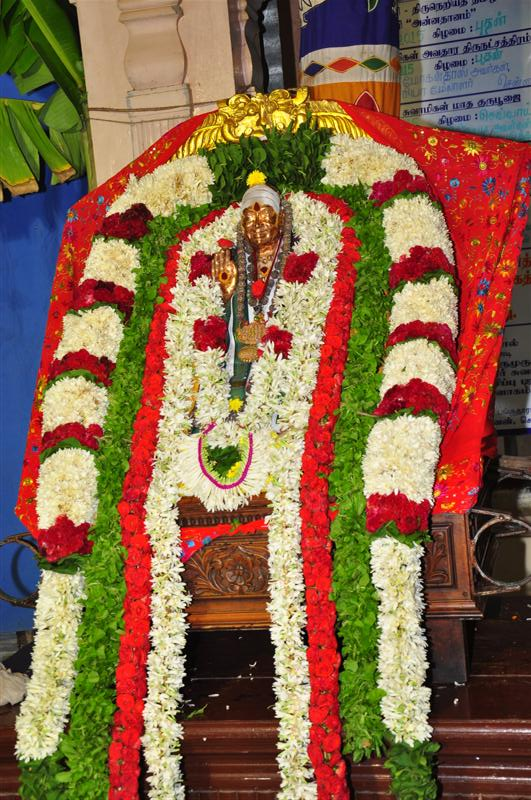
7 November 2015 function vellore

Thirumuruga Kirupanandha Variyar (1906–1993) was a Shaivite spiritual teacher from Tamil Nadu, India. He is known for his discourses on various Shaivite legends.

== Early life ==
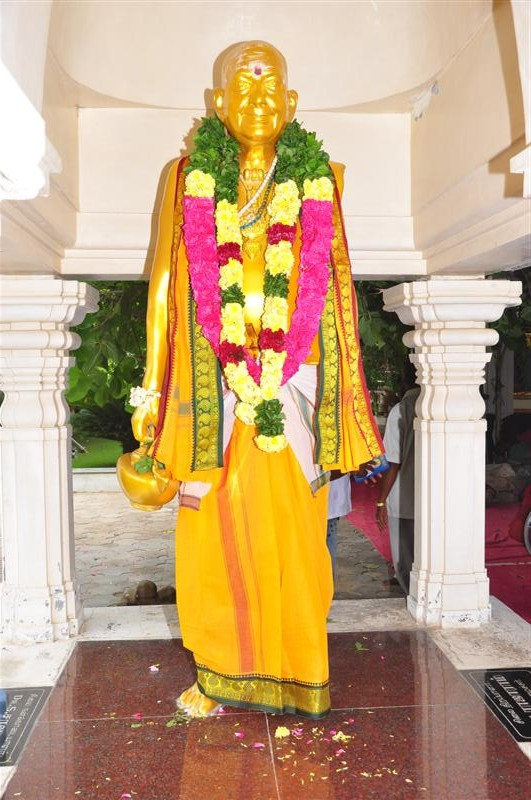
Kirupanandha Variyar Swamy statue at Kangeyanalore Temple

He was born at 4:37 IST on 25 August 1906, in a Mudaliar Sengunthar family at Kangeyanallur, a hamlet on the bank of the Palar river, near Katpadi in present-day Vellore district, Tamil Nadu.

== Spiritual work ==
He was a Murugan devotee who helped rebuild and complete the works on many of the temples across Tamil Nadu.

At the time when the atheist movement swept Tamil Nadu, he sought to re-establish Hinduism and Theism in the State. He has also scripted a movie, Siva Kavi. He used all possible mediums to spread Hinduism. He did not consider one as inferior and another as superior. In his Detroit discourse on Murugan's kindness, he proposed that women's name should also be added as an initial to the child's name. He insisted on discipline being as important to devotion saying one without the other would be fruitless.

He is considered to be 64th Nayanar (Shaivite saint).

== Awards ==
Variyar Swamigal received the award Isai Perarignar in 1967, given to Tamil musicians every year by the Tamil Isai Sangam.

== Death ==
On 19 October 1993, Variyar flew to London for a series of spiritual lectures. Later, he fell ill and so flew back to India, arriving in Bombay (now Mumbai), Maharashtra on the early morning of 7 November. From there, he took a homeward flight for Madras (now Chennai), Tamil Nadu. Near the end of this journey, he asked an accompanying devotee "Have we crossed [over] Tirupati?". When the devotee confirmed it, Variyar asked "It is Tiruttani next, right?". Shortly after this conversation, Variyar died, chanting Murugan's name. He was aged 87 then. After the plane arrived in Madras Airport, his body was taken to Kangeyanallur and cremated there.

== Memorial ==
In 2000, a memorial to Variyar, named Variyar Swamigal Gnana Thiruvalagam, was established in the village by P. Rajagopal (1947-2019), the founder of the Saravana Bhavan chain of restaurants based in Chennai.
