= Viruthampattu =

Neighbourhood in Vellore district, Tamil Nadu, India

- Town
- Viruthampattu, Vellore, Tamil Nadu
- Coordinates: 12.9437°N 79.1340°E
- Country: India
- State: Tamil Nadu
- District: Vellore
- Elevation: 235.84 m (773.8 ft)

Languages
  - Official: Tamil, English
  - Speech: Tamil, English
- Time zone: UTC+5:30 (IST)
- PIN: 632006
- Telephone code: +91416*******
- Vehicle registration: TN - 23 ** xxxx
- Other Neighbourhoods: Vellore, Katpadi, Sathuvachari
- Corporation: Vellore Municipal Corporation
- LS: Arakkonam
- VS: Katpadi

Viruthampattu is a town in Vellore district of Tamil Nadu state in India.

== Location ==
Viruthampattu is located with the geographic coordinates of (12.9437°N 79.1340°E) in Vellore.

Viruthampattu (Tamil Nadu)

== Religion ==
=== Hindu temples ===
Hindu temples such as Mariyamman Temple, Kaliamman Temple and a Pillaiyar Temple which are under the control of Hindu Religious and Charitable Endowments Department, Government of Tamil Nadu are situated in Viruthampattu.
