= Dharapadavedu =

- neighbourhood
- Location in Tamil Nadu, India
- Coordinates: 12°57′42″N 79°3′50″E
- Country: India
- State: Tamil Nadu
- District: Vellore

Government
  - Body: Vellore Municipal Corporation
  - Mayor: Mrs. P. Karthiyayini

Population (2001)
  - Total: 30,238

Languages
  - Official: Tamil
- Time zone: UTC+5:30 (IST)
- PIN: 632007
- Telephone code: 0416
- Vehicle registration: TN-23
- Civic agency: Vellore Municipal Corporation

Dharapadavedu is a locality and zone headquarters (katpadi) in Vellore Municipal Corporation in the state of Tamil Nadu, India. Vellore-Katpadi Railway junction is located here. It is also a part of Vellore City locality.

== Demographics ==
Religious census
Religion	Percent(%)
Hindu	83.61%
Muslim	5.23%
Christian	10.52%
Sikh	0.02%
Buddhist	0.05%
Jain	0.15%
Other	0.42%
No religion	0.0%

As of 2001 India census, Dharapadavedu had a population of 30,238. Males constitute 50% of the population and females 50%. Dharapadavedu has an average literacy rate of 79%, higher than the national average of 59.5%: male literacy is 85% and, female literacy is 74%. In Dharapadavedu, 9% of the population is under 6 years of age. As per the religious census of 2011, Dharapadavedu had 83.61% Hindus, 5.23% Muslims, 10.52% Christians, 0.02% Sikhs, 0.05% Buddhists, 0.15% Jains, 0.42% following other religions and 0.% following no religion or did not indicate any religious preference.
