= Thiruvizhimizhalai Subramania Pillai =

Indian musician and nadaswaram artist

- Born: Subramania Pillai; 1 January 1895
- Died: 4 June 1984 (aged 89)
- Occupation: Nadaswaram artist
- Parents: Thiruvizhimizhalai Swaminatha Pillai (father); Sivabhagyathammal (mother)
- Relatives: Thiruvizhimizhalai Natarajasundaram Pillai (brother) Semponnarkoil Ramaswami Pillai (father-in-law)
- Awards: Sangita Kalanidhi; 1956; Padma Shri; 1974; Isai Perarignar; 1974

Thiruvizhimizhalai Subramania Pillai (1 January 1895 - 4 June 1984) was an Indian musician and nadaswaram artist, recognized as part of the renowned duo "Thiruvizhimizhalai Brothers" alongside his younger brother, Thiruvizhimizhalai Natarajasundaram Pillai. The duo achieved prominence as nadaswaram performers during the early 20th century.

== Life ==
Subramania Pillai was born on 1 January 1895 to Swaminatha Pillai and Sivabhagyathammal. Initially trained in flute, he transitioned to the nadaswaram and began performing at the age of twelve.

== Awards ==
- In 1956, he became the first nadaswaram artist to receive the Sangita Kalanidhi awarded by the Madras Music Academy.
- In 1974, he was awarded the Padma Shri by the Government of India, acknowledging his contributions to Indian classical music. In the same year, he received the Isai Perarignar award by Tamil Isai Sangam.

== Death ==
Subramania Pillai died on 4 June 1984.
