= Shenbakkam Raghavendra Swamy Mutt =

Shenbakkam Raghavendra Swami Mutt
- Navabrindhavan / Raghavendra Swami Mutt

Religion
- Affiliation: Hinduism
- Deity: Raghavendra Swamy

Location
- Location: Vellore, Shenbakkam
- State: Tamil Nadu
- Country: India
- Interactive map of Shenbakkam Raghavendra Swami Mutt
- Coordinates: 12°57′31.42″N 79°39′19.13″E

Architecture
- Type: South Indian, Kovil

Shenbakkam Raghavendra Swami Mutt is an ancient temple located on the banks of the Palar River, in Vellore district, Shenbakkam. It is located in the Indian state of Tamil Nadu around 130 km from Chennai and 200 km from Bangalore.

== History and significance of the temple ==
Madhvacharya visited this Navabrindavana and wrote a grantha on Vishnu Sahasranamam. Vyasaraja, the previous incarnation of Raghavendra installed a Sanjeeviraya Hanuman idol here.

== Description ==
At the entrance are the brindavanas of Sri Sripathi Theertha and Sri Kambaal Ramachandra Theertha of the Vyasaraja Matha.

On the first floor, the brindavanas of Sri Vidyapathi Theertha and Sri Sathyathiraja Theertha of Uttaradi Mutt are side by side.

Below their brindavanas, in a somewhat underground chamber, appear smaller brindavanas of Sri Kesava Udayaru, Sri Govinda Madhava Udayaru, Sri Bhoovaraaga Udayaru, and Sri Raghunatha Udayaru, about whom not much is known.

An early 1990s mrithika brindavana of Sri Raghavendra Swamy, makes it a Dhakshina Navabrindavana.

== Festivals ==
- January: English New Year, Hanuma Jayanthi, Purandardas Aradhana
- February: Madhwa Navami
- March: 1st- Raghavendra Pattabishekam, Vyasaraya Aradhana, Ugadi
- April: 14- Tamil New Year-1008 sangu Abhishekam
- May: Akshaya Thrithiya
- June: 9-Brindhavan pradhistha day (In 1993, Navabrindhavan is established on this day)
- July: Sri sripathi Theerthar Aradhana
- August: Vidyapathi Theerthar Aradhana-Uthradi Mutt, Sri Sathyathiraja Theerthar Aradhana, IMP- Sri Sri Raghavendra Aradhana for 3 consecutive days
- October: Vanabhojana
- November: Karthigai Full Moon Day- 1Lakh Dhiya will be lighted
- December: Sri Kambaal Ramachandra Theerthar Aradhana

Every Thursday, special poojas are performed except on Ekadesi day.
