= Vellore New Bus Terminus =

Bus terminus in Vellore, India

General information
- Other names: Vellore New Bus Stand
- Location: Vellore; Tamil Nadu; India
- Coordinates: 12.9346°N 79.1366°E
- System: Bus station
- Bus operators: Tamil Nadu State Transport Corporation(TNSTC); Andhra Pradesh State Road Transport Corporation(APSRTC); Karnataka State Road Transport Corporation(KSRTC)
- Connections: Tamil Nadu; Andhra Pradesh; Karnataka; Puducherry; Kerala and Telangana

History
- Opened: 2022
Location

Vellore New Bus Terminus, also known as Vellore New Bus Stand, is a main bus station in Vellore, Tamil Nadu, India. It is located on the Chennai-Bengaluru, National Highway 48 (India) near the Green Circle.

== About ==
Newly built Vellore bus terminus which has been built at a cost of 53.13 crores, spread over 9.25 hectares with a built-up area of 3,187 sqm, has 84 bus bays, 82 shops, three food courts, 11 waiting halls each having a capacity of at least 75 persons. Separate restrooms have also been built for commuters with disabilities. On an average, over 75,000 commuters use the temporary bus terminus in the town every day. Ramps for the physically challenged are also built in the new terminus, which is solar powered. The entire facility also comes under CCTV surveillance.

== See also ==
- Vellore Katpadi Junction
- Vellore Cantonment
- Vellore Airport
