= Thorapadi, Vellore =

Thorapadi
- Neighbourhood
- Location in Tamil Nadu, India
- Coordinates: 12.93°N 79.13°E
- Country: India
- State: Tamil Nadu
- District: Vellore District
- Talukas: Vellore

Government
  - Body: Vellore Municipal Corporation
  - Mayor: Mrs. P. Karthiyayini

Languages
  - Official: Tamil
- Time zone: UTC+5:30 (IST)
- PIN: 632002
- Telephone code: 91 416
- Vehicle registration: TN 23
- Lok Sabha constituency: Vellore
- Vidhan Sabha constituency: Vellore
- Civic agency: Vellore Municipal Corporation

Thorapadi is a part of Vellore Corporation. It is a prominent area in the city of Vellore.

Thorapadi is well known for its Vellore Central Prison, Academy of Prisons and Correctional Administration (APCA), Warder's Training Institute, Women's Jail, Christian Medical College (ranked one of the two best Medical Colleges of India by India Today), Parade Grounds and Thanthai Periyar Govt. Engineering College and Polytechnic - a prestigious institute for technical studies run by the Government of Tamil Nadu. Thorapadi is 7 km from Katpadi Junction Railway Station, 4 km from old bus terminus (FORT), 5 km from new bus terminus (GREEN CIRCLE) and 3 km from Cantonment Railway Station.

== Geography ==
Thorapadi is located at 12.93° N 79.13° E. It has an average elevation of 216 metres (708 feet). It is surrounded by Sripuram in the south, Allapuram in the north, Otteri-Bagayam in the east and Great Thorapadi Lake in the west.

Ram Chandrasekaran a native of this place informs that there is no recorded history for the name reference for Thorapadi. Padi is the common name for residential areas in Agricultural adjoining Hilly areas (cf: Hindi/Sanskrit Pahad meaning Hill) and that is why we find many villages having suffix 'padi' in Tamil Land viz.Velapadi, Katpadi etc. Thorapadi would have derived its name from Thiru Padi and now corrupted to form Thorapadi. Thiru is a common name for almost all towns and cities in Tamil Nadu viz. Thiruvannamalai, Thirupattur and there are so many places starting with Prefix Thiru meaning 'the blessed'. The prominence of the place can be traced back to Britishers establishing a Central Prison during the 1800s.

== Demographics ==
As of 2001 India census, Thorapadi had a population of 14,292. Males constitute 54% of the population and females 46%. Thorapadi has an average literacy rate of 74%, higher than the national average of 59.5%: male literacy is 79%, and female literacy is 67%. In Thorapadi, 7% of the population is under 6 years of age. Tamil is the official language which is spoken as a native language and English is widely understood.

== Neighborhoods ==
Thorapadi can be subdivided into crowded north and relatively well planned south.

Azad Road is the arterial road of Thorapadi. Other important roads are Nethaji Street, Jail Road, Usur Road, CMC-Thanthai Periyar College Road (Hill Road), Pillayar Koil Street (derives its name from the Pillayar temple located at the far end of the street) and Periya Theru (big street).

Mosque Street and Janda Street is a collection of densely populated streets with predominantly muslim population.

(see Wikipedia: Kamaraj Nagar)
Kamaraj Nagar (Tamil: காமராஜ் நகர்) in southern Thorapadi, is primarily a residential neighbourhood of mainly posh dwellings, which is cool and greenery with concrete roads. It is one of the rapid developing parts of the city of Vellore. The area is named after the late chief minister of Tamil Nadu, Kamaraj. A Government higher secondary school, Vellore Central Prison, a Badminton Training School and a Theatre make Kamaraj Nagar unique in Thorapadi. Also, it is the center of local cricketing events, thanks to a huge sports (though undeveloped) ground located within Government Higher Secondary School (no fancier of local cricket can forget Kamaraj Nagar Cricket Club's breath taking victory over Punthottam Cricket Team in the finals of Millennium tournament here in 2000).

In addition to being a residential area, Kamaraj Nagar has become a busy traffic route to the Srilakshmi Golden Temple, Sripuram. The real estate market in Kamaraj Nagar and its southern extension, has been skyrocketing after the unveiling of Golden Temple.

Nethaji Street is one of the main streets Thorapadi.

Ezhil Nagar is a major (in terms of land area) residential area, which has seen an immense development in recent years. It is one of the youngest and thriving residential areas of the city. Warders training Institute of Tamil Nadu is located here.

RSA Region (Ramset Nagar, Shanmuga Nagar, Avvai Nagar) is a major residential area, which has seen an immense development in recent years. RSA region got broad roads and parks. Shanmuga Nagar Vinayagar temple, Sri Devi Mariamman Sannadhi, is located here.

Thorapadi Hills is located in the southern suburb of Thorapadi. Fitness buffs come to Hill Road to walk, jog, do yoga and socialise.

Punthottam is a less populated area adjacent to the Great Thorapadi Lake (the lake is one of the biggest of its kind in the region).

Police Housing Board is an area located on the Ariyur Railway Gate with civilized houses for Police Men.

Chinna Agamedu is a least populated. And one of the most agriculture place in end of the thorapadi lake.

== Education ==
The Christian Medical College and Thanthai Periyar Engineering College & Polytechnic are located here.
