= Mayavaram V. R. Govindaraja Pillai =

- Born: 12 May 1912; Vazhuvur, Nagapattinam district, Tamilnadu
- Died: 11 February 1979 (aged 66); Mayavaram, Tamilnadu
- Occupation: violinist

Mayavaram V. R. Govindaraja Pillai (12 May 1912 – 11 February 1979) was a Carnatic violinist from Tamil Nadu, Southern India.

== Early days ==
He was born in Vazhuvur, a village in the Kuthalam Taluk (Mayiladuthurai district). His parents died when he was a child and he was brought up by his maternal uncle.

He studied Carnatic music with Simizhi Sundaram Iyer.

He also studied with Kumbakonam Rajamanickam Pillai.

== Teaching ==
Pillai was Dean of the Music College of the Annamalai University. He was also a member of the Selection committee of All India Radio Chennai and Tiruchirappalli. Sikkil Bhaskaran and Kuththalam Vaidyalingam Pillai studied with him.

== Awards ==
- Kalaimamani, 1969 - awarded by Tamil Nadu Iyal Isai Nataka Manram (Tamil Nadu State Association of literature, music and theatre)
- Isai Perarignar, 1976 - awarded by Tamil Isai Sangam, Chennai

== Death ==
Pillai died in his home at Mayavaram on 11 February 1979.
