= Thorapadi =

Thorapadi may refer to:

- Thorapadi, Vellore
- Puthupet, also known as Thorapadi, Cuddalore
