= 2009 swine flu pandemic in India =

Outbreak evolution in India: Deaths Confirmed cases

The 2009 swine flu pandemic in India was the outbreak of swine flu in various parts of India. Soon after the outbreak of H1N1 virus in the United States and Mexico in March, the Government of India started screening people coming from the affected countries at airports for swine flu symptoms. The first case of the flu in India was found on the Hyderabad airport on 13 May, when a man traveling from US to India was found H1N1 positive. Subsequently, more confirmed cases were reported and as the rate of transmission of the flu increased in the beginning of August, with the first death due to swine flu in India in Pune, panic began to spread. As of 24 May 2010, 10193 cases of swine flu have been confirmed with 1035 deaths.

The only known drug to work against H1N1 (Tamiflu) was not sold in general medical stores, to prevent the virus from developing antimicrobial resistance due to excessive use. The government feared that people would pop in pills for no reason, thereby making the virus resistant to its only known cure. The problem facing the state machinery was that flu infected cases were coming from across the country.

Generic version of Tamiflu (Oseltamivir) was made available in Indian market, after several months of swine flu attack. Natco Pharma and Strides Arcolabs have launched their generic version of Oseltamivir, Natflu and Starflu. These drugs were made available to the customers directly under prescription.

On 8 August 2010 the Indian government reported there had been 1833 deaths from swine flu in the country.

On 18 October 2010 a biotechnology firm announced the launch of India's first indigenously developed cell culture H1N1 Swine Flu Vaccine under the brand name HNVAC.

== Background ==
A new strain of influenza virus, officially named the "new H1N1", first identified in April 2009, and commonly called "Swine flu" initially spread in Mexico and then globally by transmission. It is thought to be a mutation of four known strains of the influenza A virus, subtype H1N1: one endemic in (normally infecting) humans, one endemic in birds, and two endemic in pigs (swine). Experts assume the virus "most likely" emerged from pigs in Asia, and was carried to North America by infected persons. The virus typically spreads from coughs and sneezes or by touching contaminated surfaces and then touching the nose or mouth. Symptoms, which can last up to a week, are similar to those of seasonal flu, and may include fever, sneezes, sore throat, coughs, headache, and muscle or joint pains.

== Deaths ==
The first death was a 14-year-old girl in Pune, Maharashtra. On 8 and 9 August a 43-year-old man in Ahmedabad, Gujarat, a 42-year-old teacher in Pune and a 53-year-old woman in Mumbai died. On 10 August a 53-year-old doctor in Pune and a 4-year-old in Chennai died. On 11 August a 7-year-old girl in Vadodara, Gujarat died. On 13 August, a 26-year-old woman became Bangalore's first victim of swine flu. An eleven-month-old boy, a 75-year-old woman and a 37-year-old woman died taking the toll in Pune, severely hit by the virus, to 15 and across the country, to 24.A lady having a young daughter of 5 yrs died near Mumbai in Khopoli on 14 August. On 13 August, three people died at different hospitals in Bangalore, according to the reports.

Swine flu death toll crosses 500 in India. New Delhi, 10 November—The death toll of the H1N1 flu in India is rising in leaps and bounds with 18 new fatalities reported Monday. Within the short space of a little over three months, the mortality figure has shot up to 503.

=== Influenza A H1N1 status ===
As of 8 August 2010 there had been 1833 deaths from H1N1 swine influenza reported.

As of 31 January the death toll of A/H1N1 influenza was 1229, and the number of laboratory confirmed cases of A/H1N1 (including uncomplicated cases) was 28,810.

As of 8 February, the number of confirmed deaths due to A/H1N1 in India had risen to 1270.

As of 12 February, the number of confirmed deaths from A/H1N1 pandemic influenza had risen to 1302.

As of 24 February 1357 confirmed deaths from H1N1 have been reported in India, and 29,583 confirmed cases of H1N1 have been reported.

As of 12 March 2010, 1404 confirmed deaths from H1N1 influenza have been reported, and at least 29,904 laboratory-confirmed cases of H1N1 have been reported.

States of India per confirmed deaths 0 deaths 1+ deaths 10+ deaths 100+ deaths 200+ deaths

States of India per confirmed cases 4000+ cases 2000+ cases 1000+ cases 500+ cases 100+ cases 1+ cases no case confirmed

Consolidated Status of Influenza A H1N1 : 2 January 2011

Consolidated Status of Influenza A H1N1 : 8 August 2010
| Sl. | State | Lab confirmed cases reported during the week | Lab confirmed cases cumulative | Death of Lab confirmed cases during the week | Death of Lab confirmed cases cumulative |
|---|---|---|---|---|---|
| 1 | Delhi | 106 | 11156 | 0 | 0 |
| 2 | Andhra Pradesh | 105 | 1506 | 6 | 0 |
| 3 | Karnataka | 200 | 4409 | 12 | 0 |
| 4 | Tamil Nadu | 36 | 3143 | 0 | 0 |
| 5 | Maharashtra | 400 | 9943 | 51 | 0 |
| 6 | Kerala | 17 | 2850 | 121 | – |
| 7 | Punjab | 1 | 205 | 0 | 0 |
| 8 | Haryana | 2 | 2070 | 0 | 0 |
| 9 | Chandigarh | 0 | 331 | 0 | 0 |
| 10 | Goa | 15 | 129 | 1 | 1 |
| 11 | West Bengal | 23 | 256 | 1 | 0 |
| 12 | Uttarakhand | 0 | 152 | 0 | 1 |
| 13 | Himachal Pradesh | 0 | 24 | 0 | 1 |
| 14 | Jammu and Kashmir | 0 | 112 | 0 | 4 |
| 15 | Gujarat | 21 | 2243 | 7 | 4 |
| 16 | Manipur | 0 | 2 | 0 | 0 |
| 17 | Meghalaya | 0 | 8 | 0 | 0 |
| 18 | Mizoram | 0 | 4 | 0 | 1 |
| 19 | Assam | 0 | 52 | 0 | 2 |
| 20 | Jharkhand | 0 | 2 | 0 | 0 |
| 21 | Rajasthan | 2 | 3932 | 0 | 2 |
| 22 | Bihar | 0 | 7 | 0 | 0 |
| 23 | Uttar Pradesh | 5 | 1601 | 1 | 4 |
| 24 | Puducherry | 0 | 132 | 0 | 1 |
| 25 | Chhattisgarh | 0 | 96 | 0 | 1 |
| 26 | Madhya Pradesh | 3 | 410 | 1 | 0 |
| 27 | Daman and Diu | 0 | 1 | 0 | 0 |
| 28 | Odisha | 4 | 118 | 2 | 3 |
| 29 | Nagaland | 0 | 2 | 0 | 0 |
| 30 | Andaman and Nicobar Islands | 0 | 27 | 0 | 2 |
| 31 | Dadra and Nagar Haveli | 2 | 3 | 0 | 1 |
| Total | | 942 | 44987 | 83 | 28 |

=== Deaths in cities ===
- Pune – 144
- Bangalore – 74
- Mumbai – 18
- Nashik- 9
- Ahmedabad – 9
- Vadodara – 5
- Chennai – 4
- Delhi – 149
- Bilaspur – 2
- Dehradun – 2
- Aurangabad – 2
- Bijapur – 2
- Hyderabad – 2
- Raipur – 1
- Panaji – 1
- Thiruvananthapuram – 1
- Rajkot – 1
- Gandhinagar – 1
- Jaipur – 1
- Chandigarh – 1
- Dhule – 1
- Latur – 1
- Mussoorie – 1
- Surat – 2
- Nagpur – 1
- Ludhiana – 1
- Jodhpur and Sirohi – 34

=== Total deaths till date ===
- 24 March 2010 – 1,444
- Maharashtra reported the maximum number of 487 cases and 20 deaths; Andhra Pradesh reported 115 cases and 12 deaths; Rajasthan reported 116 cases with 12 deaths; Karnataka had 171 cases were reported, including eight deaths.

=== Total cases till date ===
- 24 March 2010 – 20,164
- India has reported 1000 cases of swine flu (H1N1) virus, including 59 deaths which occurred in spring of 2012
