= Kumbakonam Rajamanickam Pillai =

Carnatic music violinist

Isai Perarignar Sangeetha Kalanidhi Rajamanickam Pillai
- Born: 5 August 1898; Alangudi, Tanjore District, Madras Presidency, British India (now Thanjavur District, Tamil Nadu, India)
- Died: November 1970 (aged 72)
- Occupation: viloinist
- Relatives: Thyagu (grandson)

Kumbakonam Rajamanickam Pillai (Tamil: கும்பகோணம் ராஜமாணிக்கம் பிள்ளை), 5 August 1898 - 1970 was a Carnatic music violinist of Tamil Nadu, Southern India.

== Early Days ==
He was born in the small village of Alangudi in a Isai Vellalar family (Note: There is another Alangudi that is a State Assembly constituency in Pudukottai district) near Needamangalam located on the route going from Thanjavur to Tiruvarur. His mother Kamalathammal was keen that he should develop his musical talents.

He commenced his training first as a vocalist under Nadaswaram maestro Kandaswamy Pillai. Later on, he underwent further training from Tiruvisanallur Pallavi Narayanaswamy Iyer and then from Pandanallur Chinnaswamy Pillai. As an instrumentalist he trained in violin for four years under Tirukodikaval Ramaswamy Iyer who was a disciple of violin maestro Tirukodikaval Krishna Iyer. His teachers opined that his music talents were more suited to be a violinist than to be a singer. So, he devoted full concentration as a violinist.

== As a violinist ==
He concentrated on classical Carnatic music. Most of the time he performed as an accompanist to Carnatic singers rather than giving solo concerts. He accompanied top singers of his time.

== Honours and awards ==
=== Honours ===
- He was honoured in the Royal Courts of Ramanathapuram, Kochchin, Ettayapuram, Trivandrum and Mysore.
- He was appointed Asthana Vidhwan in the Courts at Trivancore in 1940 and at Ettayapuram in 1942.
- Trivandrum Chiththirai Thirunal Maharaja honoured Rajamanickam Pillai and presented an elephant to him.

=== Awards ===
- Sangeetha Kalanidhi, 1948 Awarded by Music Academy, Chennai.
- Sangeet Natak Akademi, 1959
- Isai Perarignar, 1957 Awarded by Tamil Isai Sangam.

== Students ==
M. M. Dandapani Desikar and Mayavaram V. R. Govindaraja Pillai are two of his disciples who became famous. Cine actor Thyagu is his grandson.
