= Konavattam =

Western parts of Vellore City, Tamil Nadu, India

- Neighbourhood
- Location in Tamil Nadu, India
- Coordinates: 12°55′23″N 79°06′41″E
- Country: India
- State: Tamil Nadu
- District: Vellore District
- Talukas: Vellore

Government
  - Body: Vellore city municipal Corporation
  - Mayor: mrs.P. Karthiyayini

Languages
  - Official: Tamil, Urdu
- Time zone: UTC+5:30 (IST)
- PIN: 632013
- Telephone code: 91 416
- Vehicle registration: TN 23
- Lok Sabha constituency: Vellore
- Vidhan Sabha constituency: Vellore
- Civic agency: Vellore city municipal Corporation

Konavattam is a part of Vellore Municipal Corporation, located at the western end of the city. Konal in Tamil means the zig zag; Vattam means the circle. Hence the original name of the place seems the zig zag circle. Its in Vellore district in the Indian state of Tamil Nadu. For the city of Vellore, Konavattam is the gateway to NH-46 highway. This area houses major automobiles dealerships and is close to the idle Vellore airport at Abdullapuram. It has 2 depots of tnstc-vpm (vellore region).

== Demographics ==
As of 2001 India census, Konavattam had a population of 9351. Males constitute 49% of the population and females 51%. Konavattam has an average literacy rate of 67%, higher than the national average of 59.5%: male literacy is 74%, and female literacy is 60%. In Konavattam, 13% of the population is under 6 years of age. The main spoken language is Tamil. Minority language spoken is Urdu. Migrant languages include Telugu, Marathi, and Malayalam.
