= Vellore City Municipal Corporation =

Civic body that governs Vellore, India

Type
- Type: Municipal Corporation of the Vellore

Leadership
- Mayor: Sujatha Anandakumar, DMK since 4 March 2022
- Deputy Mayor: M. Sunil Kumar, DMK since 4 March 2022
- Commissioner: Tmt.A.Sultana
- District Collector: Tmt.V.R.Subbulaxmi, IAS

Structure
- Seats: 60
- Political groups: Government (44): SPA (44); DMK (44); Opposition (16): AIADMK+ (8); AIADMK (7); BJP (1); Others (8); Independent (8)

Elections
- Last election: 2022
- Next election: 2027

Website
- www.tnurbantree.tn.gov.in/vellore/

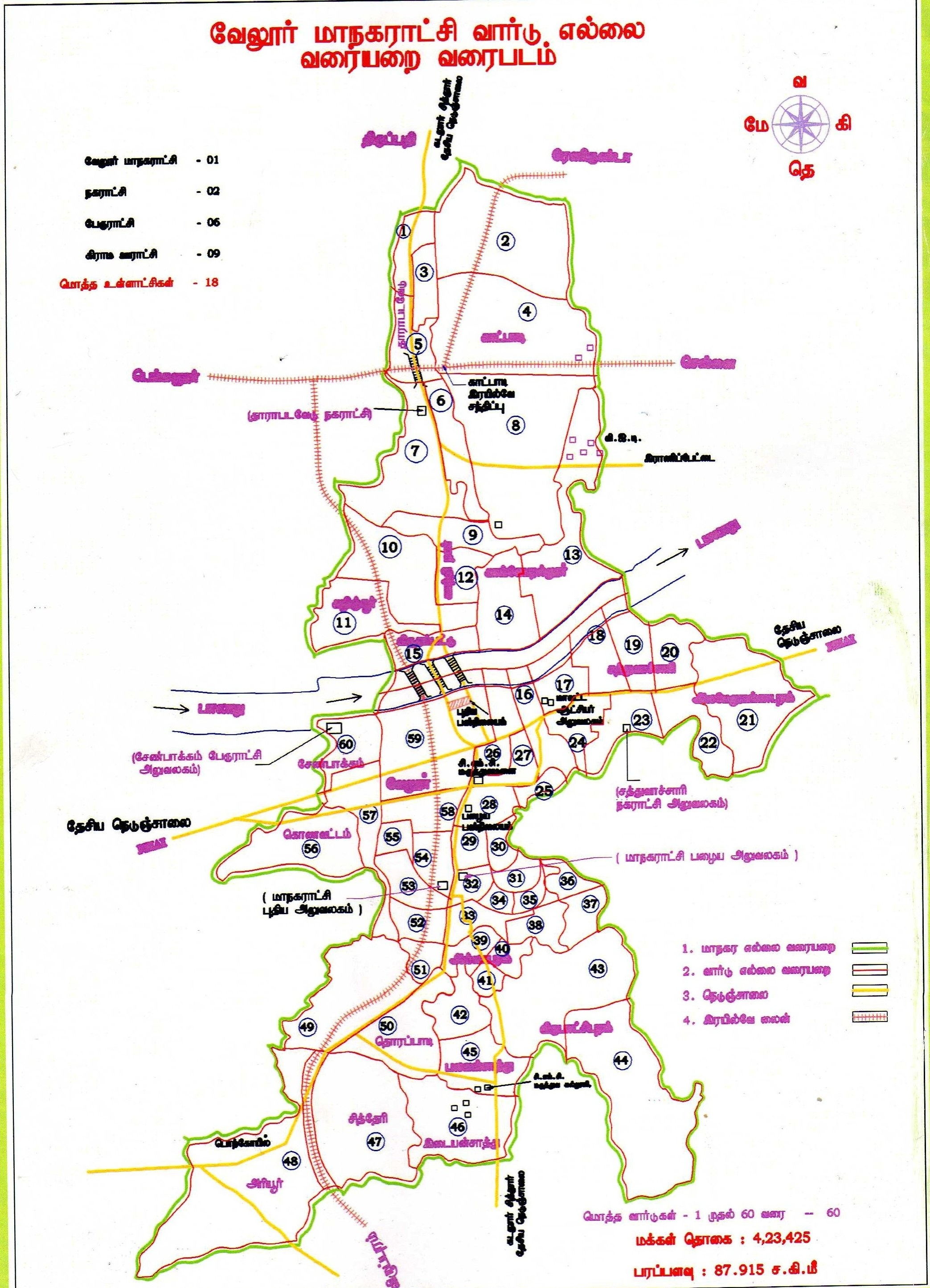
Vellore Corporation

Vellore City Municipal Corporation is a civic body that governs the city of Vellore, Tamil Nadu, India. Vellore corporation consist of 60 wards and is headed by a mayor who presides over a deputy mayor and 60 councillors who represent each wards in the city.

The current mayor of Vellore is Sujatha Anandakumar of the DMK, which also holds a majority in the corporation.

== Demographics ==
As per the 2011 census results, Vellore UA has a population of above 8 lakhs. City Population grew from 423,425 in 2001 to 502,000 in 2011. Vellore City consists of Sathuvachari, Vallalar, Dharapadavedu, Shenbakkam, Allapuram, Fort, Kaspa, Vasanthapuram, Thiyagarajapuram, Thottapalayam, Saidapet, Thorapadi, Hazrath makkan, Otteri, Velapadi, Salavanpet, Rangapuram, Bagayam, Kazhinjur, Gandhi Nagar, Katpadi, Palavansaathu, Virupakshipuram, Konavattam, Viruthampattu, Kangeyanallur, Idaynsaathu, Sripuram, Alamelumangapuram(A.M.Puram) and Chitheri.

Total Metropolitan area spans across 200 km^{2} approximately. Total City limit area is 153.14 km^{2} according to the G.O.(Rt).No. 221 Dated 28.09.2010 issued by Tamil Nadu government. The population of Vellore Corporation based on that GO as of 2001 was 423,425. Vellore City Municipal Corporation is divided into four zones namely Vellore Fort, Sathuvachari, Shenbakkam and Katpadi.

According to 2011 census Vellore agglomeration population is 481,966. In 2011 Census Data they have missed out three places. The census bureau has listed the city population as UA population. Actual population of Vellore including the missed out places, will be 502,000 and the population of Vellore UA will be 1.5 million.

== History ==
Vellore town was constituted as a third-grade municipality in 1866, promoted to first – grade during 1947, further moved to Selection – Grade from 1997. Due to the increasing population and income it was declared as Special Grade Municipality w.e.f. 01.01.1979 and became Municipal Corporation from 1 August 2008. Vellore City Municipal Corporation has 60 wards and there will be an elected councilor for each wards respectively

== Corporation Administratives ==
Mayor - Mrs. Sujatha Anandhakumar DMK

Deputy mayor - Mr. Sunil DMK

Corporation Commissioner - Tmt.A.Sultana IAS

== Members of council ==
Dravida Munnetra Kazhagam - 44 members

All India Anna Dravida Munnetra Kazhagam - 7 members

Bharatiya Janata Party - 1 member

Independent politicians - 8 members
