= Sathuvachari =

Eastern parts of Vellore City, Tamil Nadu, India

Sathuvachari Sathuvachari
- Neighbourhood
- Sathuvachari after dusk

- Location in Tamil Nadu, India
- Coordinates: 12°56′36″N 79°09′55″E
- Country: India
- State: Tamil Nadu
- District: Vellore District
- Talukas: Vellore

Government
  - Body: Vellore Municipal Corporation

Languages
  - Official: Tamil
- Time zone: UTC+5:30 (IST)
- PIN: 632009
- Telephone code: 91 416
- Vehicle registration: TN 23
- Lok Sabha constituency: Vellore
- Vidhan Sabha constituency: Vellore
- Civic agency: Vellore Municipal Corporation

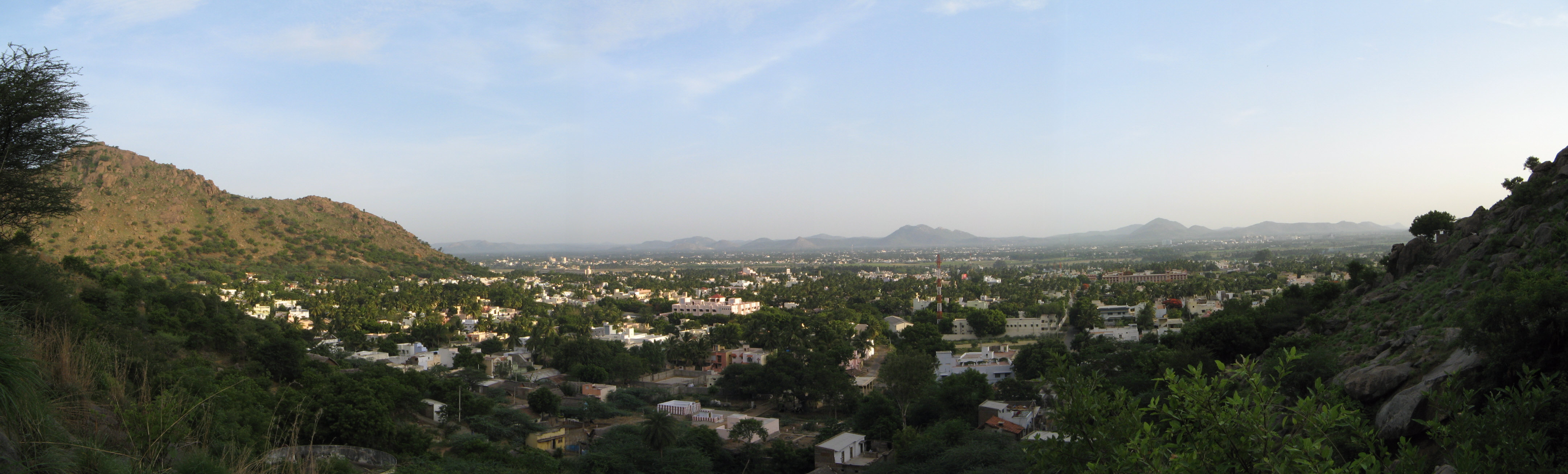
A Panorama of Sathuvachari

Sathuvachari is an area and Zone-II headquarters of Vellore Municipal Corporation. It is located in the east of Vellore city. It is situated in the bank of Palaar River.

== Demographics ==
Religious census
Religion	Percent(%)
Hindu	85.01%
Muslim	7.9%
Christian	6.5%
Sikh	0.03%
Buddhist	0.04%
Jain	0.18%
Other	0.32%
No religion	0.01%

As of 2011 India census, Sathuvachari had a population of above 1.5 lacs. Males constitute 50% of the population and females 50%. Sathuvachari has an average literacy rate of 79%, higher than the national average of 59.5%: male literacy is 84%, and female literacy is 75%. In Sathuvachari, 10% of the population is under 6 years of age. As per the religious census of 2011, Sathuvachari had 85.01% Hindus, 7.9% Muslims, 6.5% Christians, 0.03% Sikhs, 0.04% Buddhists, 0.18% Jains, 0.32% following other religions and 0.01% following no religion or did not indicate any religious preference.

== Historical significance ==
The Shiva Lingam of Jalakandeswarar temple was kept here, after the Muslim invaders, took over vellore fort.
