= Isai Perarignar =

Isai Perarignar (Tamil: இசைப் பேரறிஞர்) is an award given to a Tamil musician every year by the Tamil Isai Sangam of Tamil Nadu, Southern India.

== Details about the award ==
With the aim of promoting Tamil language songs in Tamil classical concerts, the Tamil Isai Sangam conducts a 12-day music festival in December every year. The festival is conducted in Chennai where a number of concerts are held during what is known as the December Season.
Tamil Isai Sangam selects an exemplary musician for that year. On the first day of the festival, it awards the title of "Isai Perarignar" along with a gold medal and a purse to the selected musician.

== Recipients ==
Year	Artist	Field
2016	Sanjay Subrahmanyan	Vocalist
2015	Haridwaramangalam AK Palanivel	Tavil
2014	Sirkazhi G. Sivachidambaram	Vocalist
2013	Krishnakumari Narendran	Bharathanatyam Teacher
2012	M. P. N. Ponnusamy	Nadaswaram
2011	Sudha Ragunathan	Vocalist
2010	T. N. Krishnan	Violin
2009	Aruna Sairam	Vocalist
2008	Sembonnarkoil S. R. D. Vaidyanathan	Nadaswaram
2007	Saidai T. Natarajan	Devotional song
2006	Bombay Sisters	Vocalist
2005	Thiruvidaimarudur P. S. V. Raja	Nadaswaram
2004	K. J. Sarasa	Choreographer
2003	M. S. Viswanathan	Music Director
2002	M. Balamuralikrishna	Vocalist
2001	Kanchipuram M. N. Venkatavaradhan	Vocalist
2000	Madurai T. N. Seshagopalan	Vocalist
1999	Kanchipuram A. Vinayaga Mudaliar	Vocalist
1998	N. Ramani	Flute
1997	Tiruvizha R. Jayashankar	Nadaswaram
1996	T. R. Pappa	Music Director
1995	Dr. Thirupampuram S. Shanmugasundaram	Traditional Music
1994	Dr. Padma Subramanyam	Bharathanatyam
1993	Sheik Chinna Moulana	Nadaswaram
1992	K. J. Yesudas	Vocalist
1991	Maharajapuram V. Santhanam	Vocalist
1990	Valayapatti A. R. Subramaniam	Tavil
1989	Kunnakkudi Vaidyanathan	Violin
1988	A. K. C. Nadarajan	Clarinet
1987	R. S. Manohar	Drama
1986	Dharmapuram P. Swaminathan	Devotional song
1985	Thanjai K. P. Kittappa Pillai	Choreographer
1984	Lalgudi Jayaraman	Violin, Music Director
1983	Namagiripettai K. Krishnan	Nadaswaram
1982	Seergazhi Govindarajan	Vocalist
1981	Dr. S. Ramanathan	Vocalist
1980	M. P. Somasundaram	Devotional Music Co-ordinator
1979	Ramanathapuram C. S. Murugapoopathy	Mridangam
1978	M. L. Vasanthakumari	Vocalist
1977	Thiruveezhimizhalai S. Natarajasundaram Pillai	Nadaswaram
1976	Mayavaram V. R. Govindaraja Pillai	Violin
1975	T. Balasaraswathi	Bharathanatyam
1974	Thiruveezhimizhalai S. Subramania Pillai	Nadaswaram
1973	D. K. Pattammal	Vocalist
1972	M. P. Periyasamy Thooran	Lyricist
1971	Madurai S. Somasundaram	Vocalist
1970	M. S. Subbulakshmi	Vocalist
1969	Semmangudi Srinivasa Iyer	Vocalist
1968	Palghat T. S. Mani Iyer	Mridangam
1967	Kirupanandha Variyar	Devotional Musical Discourse
1966	K. B. Sundarambal	Vocalist
1965	Papanasam Sivan	Vocalist, lyricist
1964	Chittoor Subramania Pillai	Vocalist
1963	Musiri Subramania Iyer	Vocalist
1962	Madurai Mani Iyer	Vocalist
1961	Vazhuvoor B. Ramiah Pillai	Choreographer
1960	Ariyakudi Ramanuja Iyengar	Vocalist
1959	P. S. Veerasamy Pillai	Nadaswaram
1957	Kumbakonam Rajamanickam Pillai	Fiddle
1957	P. Sambamurthy	Musicologist
1957	M. M. Dandapani Desigar	Lyricist
