= Kammavanpet =

Neighbourhood in Vellore district, Tamil Nadu, India

- village
- Nickname: RanuvaPettai
- Kammavanpet, Vellore, Tamil Nadu
- Coordinates: 12.7740°N 79.1797°E
- Country: India
- State: Tamil Nadu
- District: Vellore
- Elevation: 232.79 m (763.7 ft)

Languages
  - Official: Tamil
- Time zone: UTC+5:30 (IST)
- PIN: 632319
- Vehicle registration: TN-23
- Coastline: 0 kilometres (0 mi)

Kammavanpet (also known as Ranuvapettai) is a village near Vellore, Tamil Nadu, India. The Indian Armed Forces has a number of recruits from Kammavanpet and neighbouring villages, with military spending being a major sources of income.

Many youngsters in the village train regularly for military recruitment.
