= Gandhinagar, Vellore =

Gandhinagar
- Neighbourhood
- Location in Tamil Nadu, India
- Coordinates: 12.953°N 79.141°E
- Country: India
- State: Tamil Nadu
- District: Vellore District
- Talukas: Vellore

Government
  - Body: Vellore Municipal Corporation
  - Mayor: Mrs. P. Karthiyayini

Languages
  - Official: Tamil
- Time zone: UTC+5:30 (IST)
- PIN: 632006
- Telephone code: 91 416
- Vehicle registration: TN 23
- Lok Sabha constituency: Vellore
- Vidhan Sabha constituency: Vellore
- Civic agency: Vellore Municipal Corporation

Gandhinagar (also Gandhi Nagar) is locality in Vellore, India, located on the northern bank of the Palar River.It is divided into Gandhi Nagar East and Gandhi Nagar West, it is one of the posh residential and commercial localities in Vellore city.

== Geography ==
Gandhinagar is located at 12.953°N 79.141°E.

== Demographics ==
As of the 2001 Indian Census, Gandhinagar's population is 9708. Males constitute 48% of the population and females constitute 52%. Gandhinagar has an average literacy rate of 90%, higher than the national average of 59.5%. Male literacy is 91%, and female literacy is 90%.

== Notable residents ==
- G. Viswanathan, founder and chancellor of Vellore Institute of Technology.
- Durai Murugan, former Law minister.
