= Vellore riots of 1930–1931 =

Communal riots in Vellore

Vellore riots of 1930–1931 are a series of communal riots between Hindus and Muslims in Vellore, Tamil Nadu, India in 1930–1931.

== Events ==
The first of the communal riots broke out on 8 June 1930 originating in a clash between a group of Muslims leading a Muharram procession past a Hindu temple and Hindu worshippers at the temple. The reason for the outbreak was claimed to be an offensive gesture towards the Hindu deity at the temple by a member of the procession. The riot was followed by a minor clash between Christians and Muslims in Udayandiram in North Arcot. There were fears of a riot in Madras city and security was tightened all over the Madras Presidency.

In 1931, a second communal riot broke out in Vellore. This originated in a clash between a procession of members of the Indian National Congress and a Muslim procession in celebration of Milad-un-Nabi. The house of Muslim leader, Janab Abdul Jabbar, who is alleged to have instigated the rioters, was set on fire by a mob of over 200 Hindus but was, however, saved from destruction. A third riot broke out in August 1931 during a Hindu festival.
