= Vellore Cantonment railway station =

Railway station in Tamil Nadu, India

Vellore Cantonment

General information
- Location: Infantry Road, Cantonment, Vellore, Tamil Nadu, India
- Coordinates: 12.9107°N 79.1279°E
- Elevation: 215 metres (705 ft)
- Owner: Indian Railways
- Line: Broad gauge
- Platforms: 3
- Tracks: 5
- Connections: Taxi, Autorickshaw, Bus

Construction
- Structure type: Railway station
- Parking: Available
- Cycle facilities: Available
- Accessible: Disabled access

Other information
- Status: Functioning
- Station code: VLR
- Fare zone: Southern Railways
Location

Vellore Cantonment (station code: VLR) is an NSG–5 category Indian railway station in Tiruchirappalli railway division of Southern Railway zone. It is a railway station that serves the city of Vellore, in addition to Katpadi Junction. The station is located on Viluppuram–Tirupati line. It is located at the heart of the city on Infantry road (near Vellore Municipal Corporation).

The station was originally served by a metre-gauge line. After a gauge conversion drive taken up by Southern Railways, the line was converted to a broad gauge in 2010. After gauge conversion the first train Rameswaram–Tirupati Express passed through this station in April 2011.

== Facilities ==
Since this railway station is relatively new, not many facilities exist. A light refreshment functions on platform 1.

== Connections ==
Bus facilities connecting the other parts of city and Katpadi Junction, Vellore Town, Vellore Cantonment are available right outside the railway station. Taxis and Auto are other primary modes of transport.

== Projects and development ==
It is one of the 73 stations in Tamil Nadu to be named for upgradation under Amrit Bharat Station Scheme of Indian Railways.
