= Apollo KH Hospital =

- Apollo Hospitals & KH Group

Geography
- Location: Vellore, Tamil Nadu, India
- Coordinates: 12.94°N 79.24°E

Services
- Emergency department: Yes
- Beds: 100

History
- Founded: 2003

Links
- Lists: Hospitals in India

Apollo KH Hospital is a multi speciality hospital located at Melvisharam in the city of Vellore, Tamil Nadu. This hospital is a product of joint venture between Apollo Hospitals, Chennai and KH Group, Melvisharam, Vellore who perceived the need of a hospital in this region.

== About ==
Apollo KH Hospital started functioning from 14 September 2003. Its campus is spread over an area of 10 acres (4.0 ha) and this hospital was established intending the development of community health.

== Services ==
Apollo KH has following facilities:

- 24 hours Emergency Care
- 24 hours Diagnostic Services
- Critical Care Units
- Emergency & Trauma Care
- Intensive Care Units
- Master Health Check Up
- Telemedicine
