= Kangeyanallur =

- neighbourhood
- Location in Tamil Nadu, India
- Coordinates: 12.953°N 79.155°E
- Country: India
- State: Tamil Nadu
- District: Vellore

Government
  - Body: Vellore Municipal Corporation
  - Mayor: Mrs.A.Sujatha

Population (2001)
  - Total: 12,672

Languages
  - Official: Tamil
- Time zone: UTC+5:30 (IST)
- Telephone code: 91 416
- Vidhan Sabha constituency: Katpadi
- Civic agency: Vellore Municipal Corporation

== Demographics ==
At the 2001 India census, Kangeyanallur had a population of 12,672. Males constitute 50% of the population and females 50%. Kangeyanallur has an average literacy rate of 79%, higher than the national average of 59.5%: male literacy is 85%, and female literacy is 73%. In Kangeyanallur, 10% of the population is under 6 years of age.
