= Shenbakkam =

- Neighbourhood
- Location in Tamil Nadu, India
- Coordinates: 12°55′28″N 79°07′12″E
- Country: India
- State: Tamil Nadu
- District: Vellore District
- Talukas: Vellore

Government
  - Body: Vellore city municipal Corporation
  - Mayor: mrs.P. Karthiyayini

Languages
  - Official: Tamil
- Time zone: UTC+5:30 (IST)
- PIN: 632008
- Telephone code: 91 416
- Vehicle registration: TN 23
- Lok Sabha constituency: Vellore
- Vidhan Sabha constituency: Vellore
- Civic agency: Vellore city municipal Corporation

Shenbakkam is a small locality adjoining with Konavattam locality and also zone-4 headquarters of Vellore Municipal Corporation in the Indian state of Tamil Nadu. The Swayambu Vinayagar temple is located here.

== Demographics ==
As of 2001 India census, Shenbakkam had a population of 13,459. Males constitute 50% of the population and females 50%. Shenbakkam has an average literacy rate of 72%, higher than the national average of 59.5%: male literacy is 79%, and female literacy is 65%. In Shenbakkam, 12% of the population is under 6 years of age.
