= Sri Narayani Hospital & Research Centre =

Geography
- Location: Vellore, Tamil Nadu, India
- Coordinates: 12.52°N 79.05°E

Organisation
- Type: General

Services
- Emergency department: Yes
- Beds: 300

Links
- Website: www.narayanihospital.com
- Lists: Hospitals in India

Sri Narayani Hospital & Research Centre is a general hospital located near the famous Sri Lakshmi Golden Temple in the city of Vellore, Tamil Nadu, India. This hospital is run by the Sri Narayani Peedam.

== Facilities ==
Facilities offered at the hospital are,

- 24-hour Service
- Intensive Care Unit
- Emergency & Trauma Care
- Health Check up

== Services ==
Speciality services offered at Sri Narayani hospital are,

- Anaesthesiology
- Andrology
- Arthroscopy Surgery
- Ayurvedic Medicine
- Cardiology
- Cardiothoracic Surgery
- Cosmetology
- Dental & Dental Surgeries
- Dermatology& Venereal Diseases
- Diabetology
- Emergency Trauma Care
- General Surgery / Laparoscopic Surgery
- General Medicine
- Internal Medicine and Diabetic care
- Micro Neuro and Spinal Surgery
- Neurology
- Otorhinolaryngology
- Obstetrics & Gynecology
- Oncology
- Ophthalmology
- Orthopaedics & Traumatology
- Surgical Gastroenterology
- Physical Medicine and Rehabilitation
- Paediatrics and Neonatology
- Psychiatry
- Pulmonology
- Radiology & Imaging Sciences
- Urology
