= Vellore Airport =

Airport in Vellore, India

- IATA: none; ICAO: VOVR

Summary
- Airport type: Public
- Owner: Ministry of Civil Aviation
- Operator: Airports Authority of India
- Serves: Vellore Metropolitan Area
- Location: AbdullaPuram, Vellore, Tamil Nadu
- Opened: 1934; 92 years ago
- Elevation AMSL: 233 m (764 ft)
- Coordinates: 12°54′31″N 079°04′00″E

Map
- Location in Vellore VOVR (India)

Runways
Direction	Length		Surface
Direction	m	ft	Surface
07/25	850	2,788.71	PEM

Vellore Airport (ICAO: VOVR) is located in Vellore, Tamil Nadu, India. It serves Vellore and Adjoining districts such as Ranipettai, Thiruvannamalai and Tirupattur in Tamilnadu and also serves the parts of Chittoor District in Andhra pradesh. This airport exactly sits at a distance of 150 kilometres apart from Karnataka's Bangalore's International Airport. As of 2020, it is revived and under construction.

== History ==
In July 2006, it was re-activated in as a part of Airports Authority of India idle airports activation programme to facilitate regular flying by trainee pilots of the Madras Flying Club whose operations were restricted with the increase in scheduled aircraft movement at Chennai Airport. The club stopped its training activities in March 2011.

The Government of Tamil Nadu had announced that it would speed up the construction of a terminal building and make the airport fully functional by 2009 to allow operation by 45-seater ATR aircraft. The Airports Authority of India (AAI) has embarked on an "idle airports activation programme" in the Southern region that includes Vellore. The Government plans to set up an aeronautical training institute and pilot academy in collaboration with Airports Authority of India. According to the latest news, the State Highways Department has to hand over 775 meters of land on Abdullapuram-Alangayam Road to the Airports Authority of India for completion of the airstrip at the upcoming Vellore Airport.

The airport was revived under the Regional Connectivity Scheme (RCS) of the MoCA in 2018. The AAI is planning to expand the airport by 66 acres to extend the airstrip and make it suitable for operation of a 20-seater aircraft under RCS. Currently runway and terminal building works are under progress, all the required infrastructure works was said to be ready by June 2019 for operations but the operation has failed to meet deadline and delayed many times, which has slowed the operation, the officials blame Highway Department for delay in handing over land for road space.

Again, in April 2023 it was reported that the Vellore Airport was being operationalized with the UDAN scheme. In September 2023, it was reported that initial tests of signaling and other equipment were successful and that the airport would imminently be opened for commercial flight operations.

== Layout and infrastructure ==
The runway expansion of 850 meters (2,790 ft) is in works, to accommodate 20-seat aircraft.

== Current status ==
Runway, taxiway and terminal building works were reported complete by 2022, with a mobile air traffic control tower in use pending a permanent structure. In September and October 2023, the Airports Authority of India (AAI) carried out signal and navigation-equipment testing, and a security team inspected the facility ahead of a Directorate General of Civil Aviation (DGCA) site visit, which officials said would be followed shortly by the launch of regular services. Officials cited outstanding land acquisition and the pending demolition of a cremation shed within airport premises, requiring district administration clearance, as remaining hurdles at the time.

In February 2025, Minister of State for Civil Aviation Murlidhar Mohol told the Rajya Sabha that development of the airport had been completed and that its licensing process was under way; of five Tamil Nadu airports selected for the Regional Connectivity Scheme-UDAN, only Salem had begun commercial operations at that point. As of November 2025, the airport was still described in press reports as under construction.

As of November 2025 no aerodrome licence had been confirmed as issued and no scheduled commercial flights had commenced.
