= Sri Lakshmi Narayani Golden Temple =

Hindu building in Vellore, India

- Sripuram

- Location within Tamil Nadu Location within India

Religion
- Affiliation: Hinduism
- Deity: Sri Lakshmi Narayani

Location
- Location: Thirumalaikodi, Vellore District
- State: Tamil Nadu
- Country: India
- Coordinates: 12.873267°N 79.08842°E

Architecture
- Completed: 4 August 2007

Website
- http://www.sripuram.org

Sri Lakshmi Narayani Golden Temple complex inside the Sripuram spiritual park is nestled at the base of a small range of green hills at Thirumalaikodi (or simply Malaikodi) Vellore in Tamil Nadu, India. It is 120 km from Tirupati, 145 km from Chennai, 160 km from Pondicherry and 200 km from Bengaluru. The Maha Kumbhabhishekam or consecration of the temple and its chief deity, Lakshmi or Maha Lakshmi, the Hindu goddess of wealth, was held on 24 August 2007, and devotees from all religions and backgrounds are welcome to visit.

== Background ==
The salient feature of 'Sripuram' is the Lakshmi Narayani temple whose Vimanam and Ardha Mandapam is covered with pure gold, housing the deity Sri Lakshmi Narayani (female consort/wife of Vishnu Narayana). The temple is located on 40 hectares (100 acres) of land and has been constructed by the Vellore-based charitable trust, Sri Narayani Peedam, headed by its spiritual leader Sri Sakthi Amma also known as 'Narayani Amma'.

== Design ==
The temple with its gold covering, has intricate work done by artisans specialising in temple art using gold. Every single detail was manually created, including converting the gold bars into gold foils and then mounting the foils on copper. Gold foil from 9 layers to 10 layers has been mounted on the etched copper plates. Every single detail in the temple art has significance from the Vedas.

Sripuram's design features a star-shaped path (Sri chakra), positioned in the middle of the lush green landscape, with a length of over 1.8 km. As one walks along this 'starpath' to reach the temple in the middle, one can also read various spiritual messages—such as the gift of the human birth itself, and the value of spirituality—along the way.

== Hospital ==
The Sri Narayani Hospital & Research Centre is a general hospital located near the Thirupuram temple complex and is also run by the 'Sri Narayani Peedam' Charitable Trust.

== Gallery ==
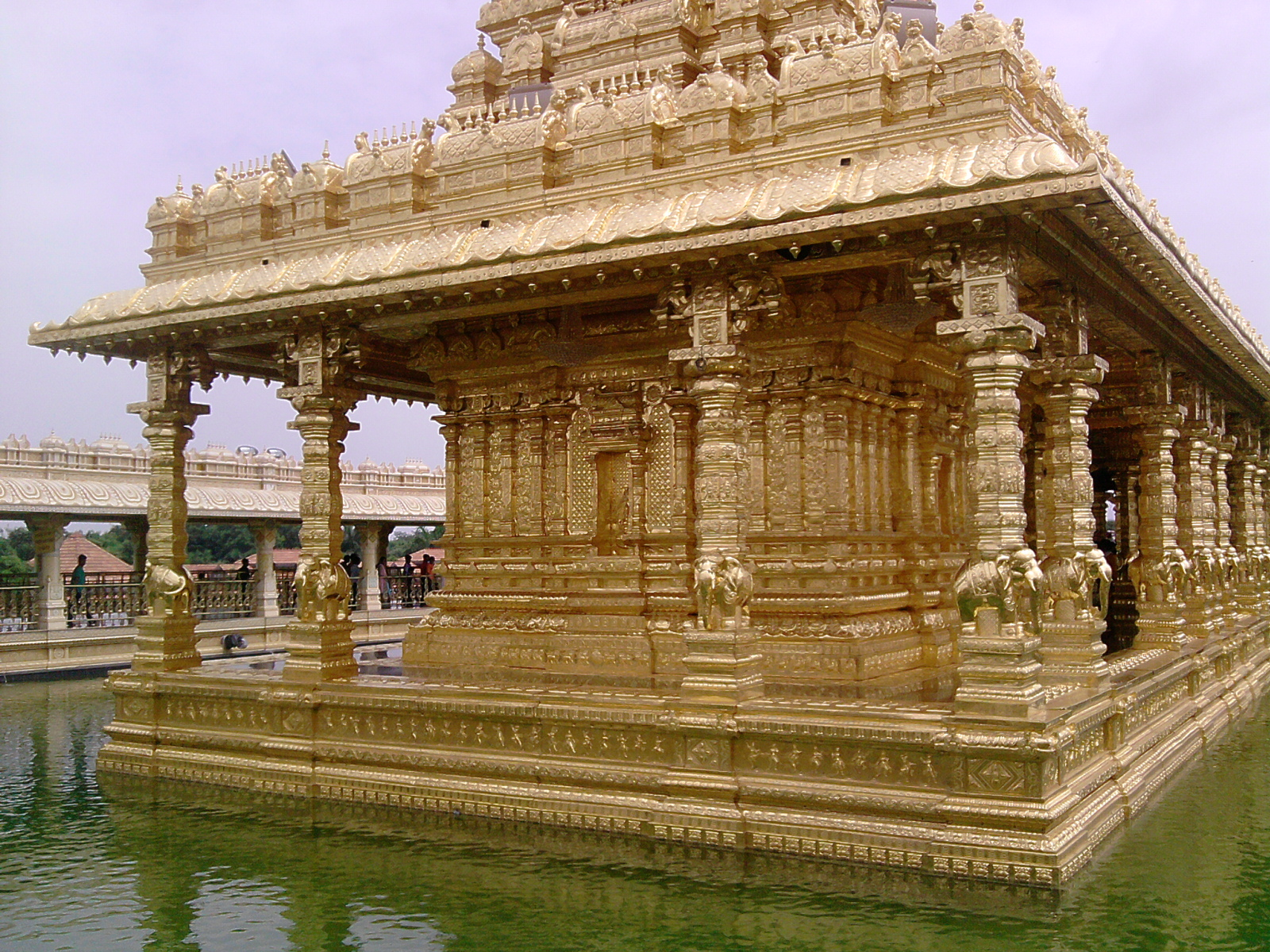
Golden Temple, Vellore, Tamil Nadu, India

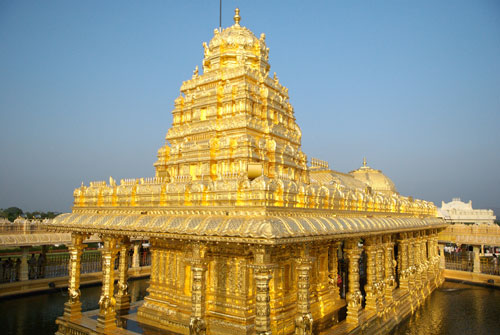
The Golden temple of Mahalakshmi

== See also ==
- Vellore Fort
- Golden Temple - Sikh temple in Amritsar
