= Katpadi =

Vellore City, Tamil Nadu, India

- Vellore City
- Katpadi, Tamil Nadu
- Coordinates: 12.973400°N 79.136900°E
- Country: India
- State: Tamil Nadu
- District: Vellore District
- City: Vellore
- Talukas: Katpadi [Vellore North]

Government
  - Body: Vellore Municipal Corporation
- Elevation: 245 m (804 ft)

Languages
  - Official: Tamil
- Time zone: UTC+5:30 (IST)
- PIN: 632007
- Telephone code: 91 416
- Vehicle registration: TN 23
- Lok Sabha constituency: Arakkonam
- Vidhan Sabha constituency: Katpadi
- Civic agency: Vellore Municipal Corporation

Katpadi (pronounced [kaːtpaːdi]) is a locality in the northern part of Vellore, in the state of Tamil Nadu, India.

== Politics and geography ==
Once a village, Katpadi was upgraded to a panchayat town, with its own taluk office. It has a major assembly constituency which is part of Arakkonam (Lok Sabha constituency).

== Vellore Institute of Technology (VIT) ==
The Vellore Institute of Technology (VIT) is in Katpadi. In 2010 it was ranked as one of the best private engineering universities in India.
