= Tamil Isai Sangam =

Isai Mandram is a music association established to promote pure form of ancient Tamil music popularly known as the tamizh Isai throughout Tamil Nadu. The current president of the association is P. R. Gopalakrishnan. The main premises are located in Chennai city.

== History ==
The association was founded in 1943 by Raja Sir Annamalai Chettiar, to promote Tamil music. Since the 1940s, the association has supported a college, the Tamil Isai Sangam College, for the instruction of Tamil music.

Every month, the association hosts a musical festival promoting the understanding of Tamil music. The association has heavily attempted to increase aware of pure Tamil Music(Tamil Isai), that have been declining in popularity in modern India. During the music festival, Tamil Isai Sangam rewards prominent classical artists for their craft. The 11th President of India, A. P. J. Abdul Kalam, once sung at the festival with a song he composed himself, to the surprise of the media. As the festival is popular in India, Kalam later explained he was using it as a venue promote the inclusion of music in the school curriculum.
