= Vellore =

City in Tamil Nadu, India

Vellore Velur
- city and municipal corporation
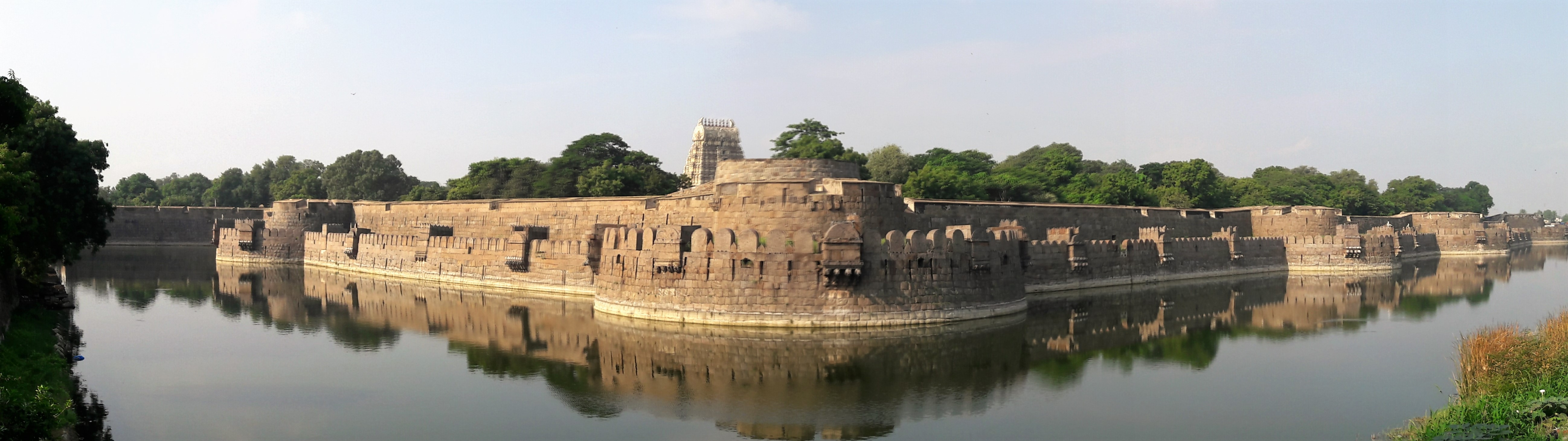
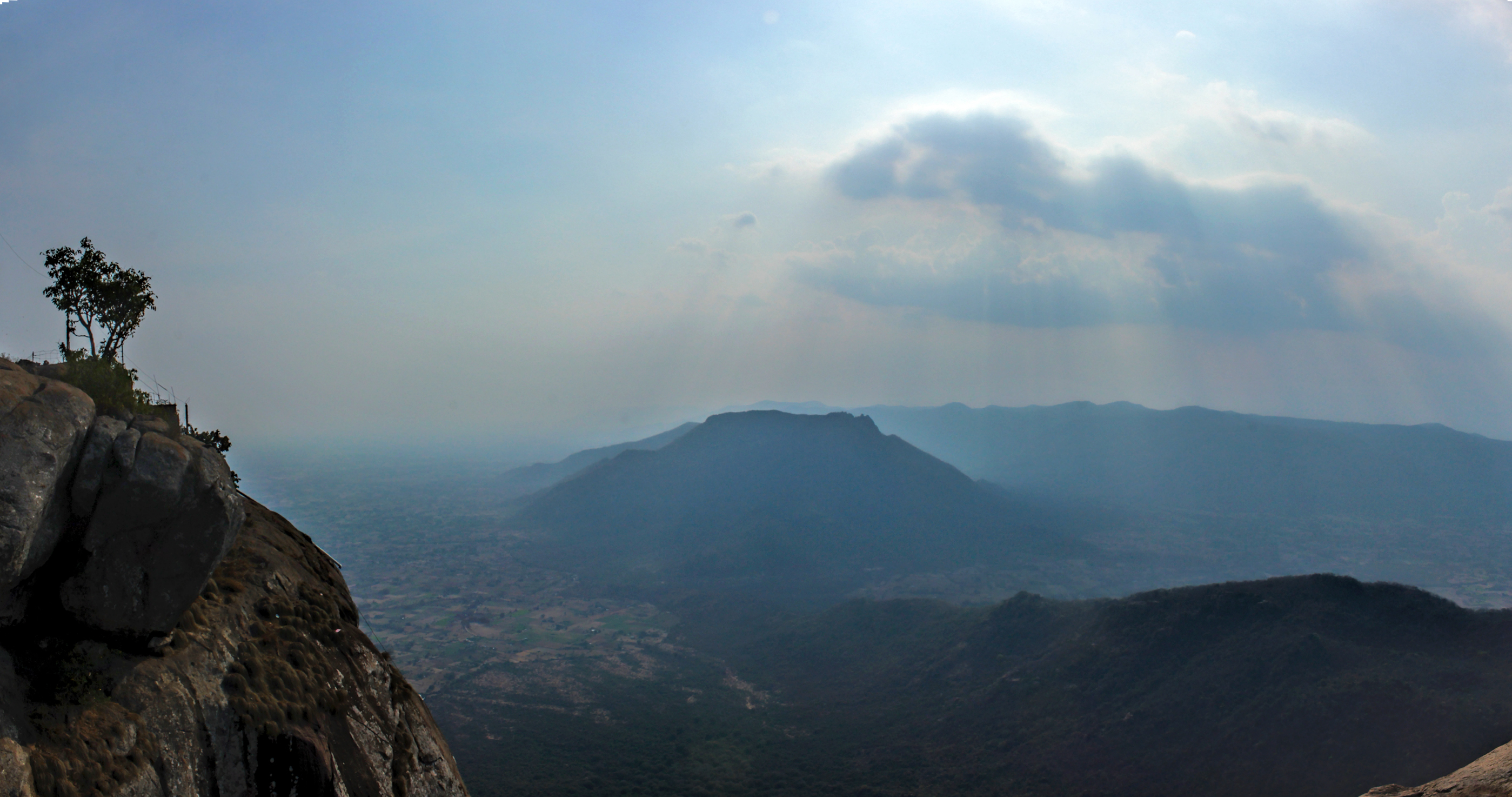
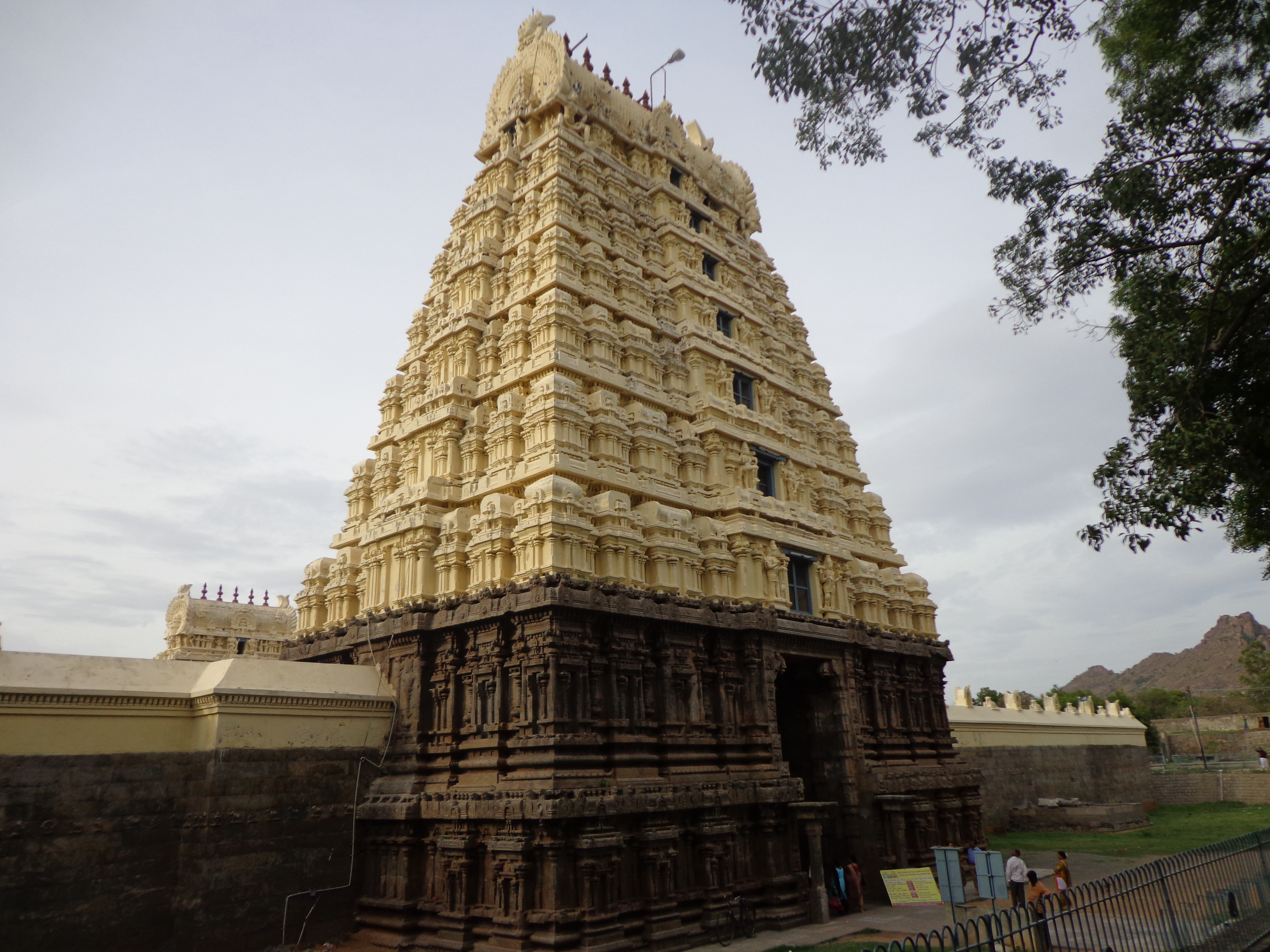
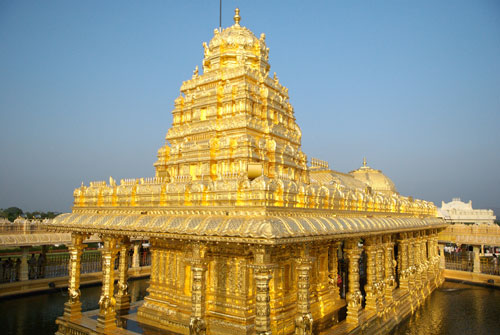
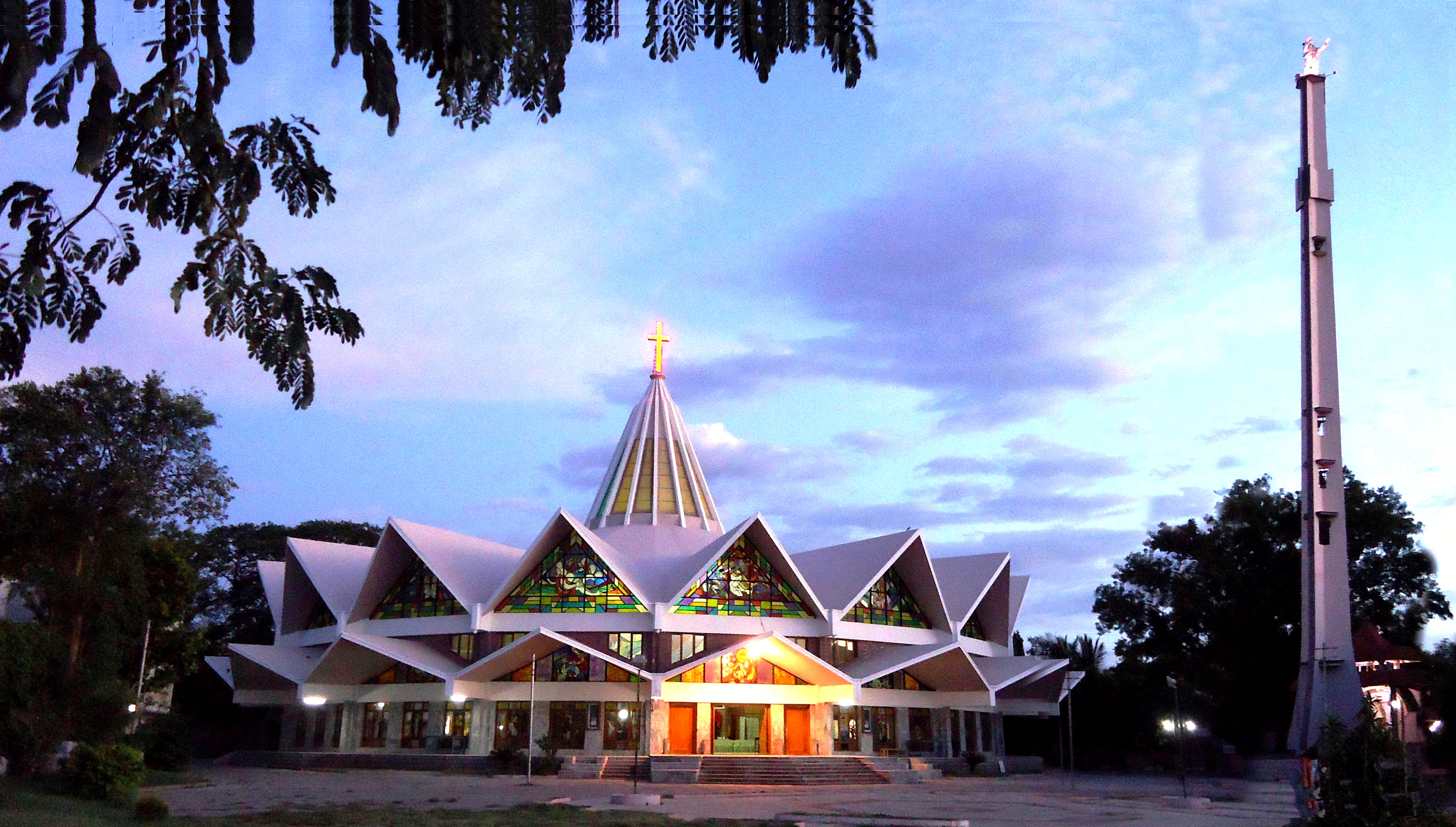
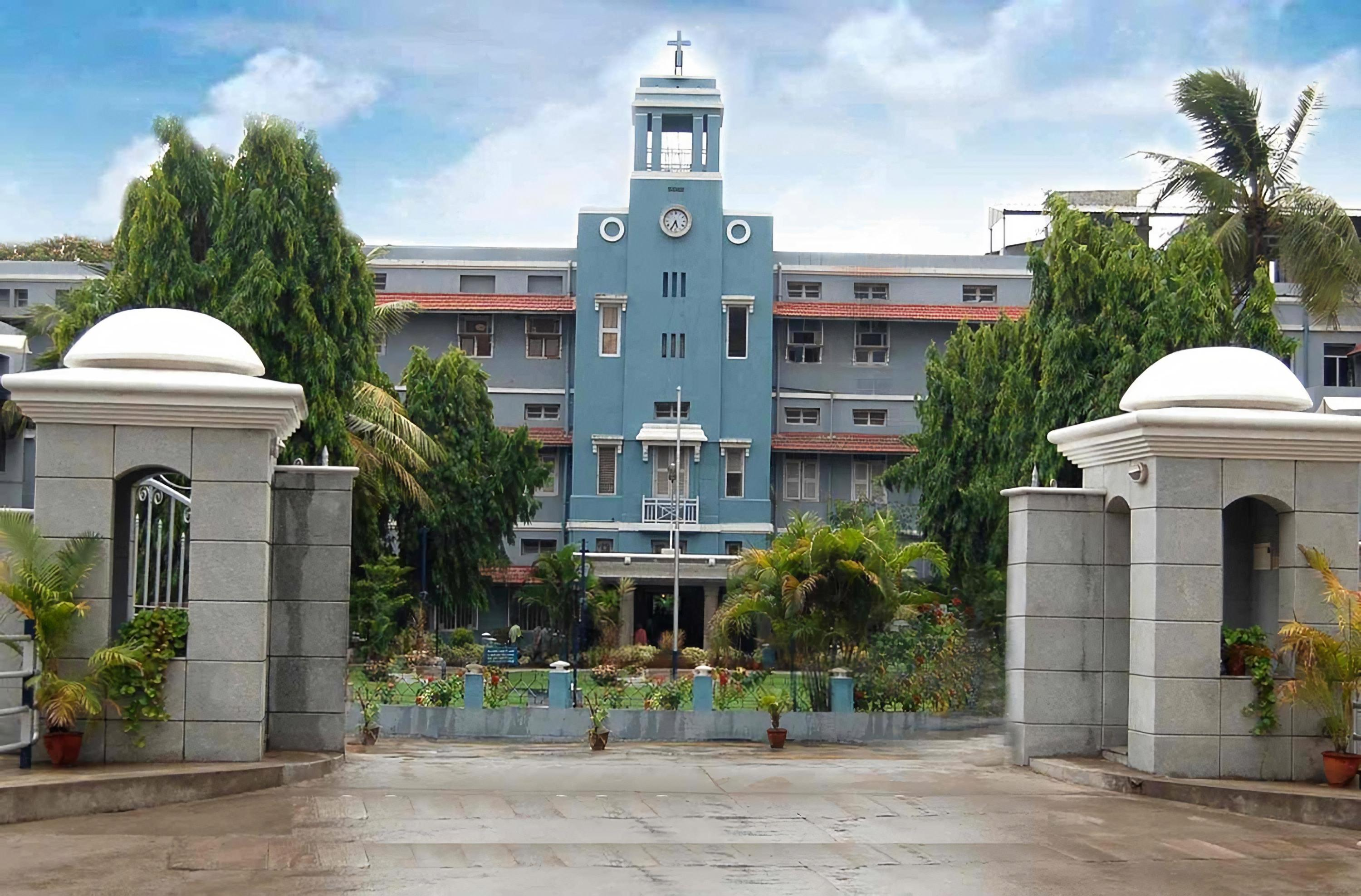
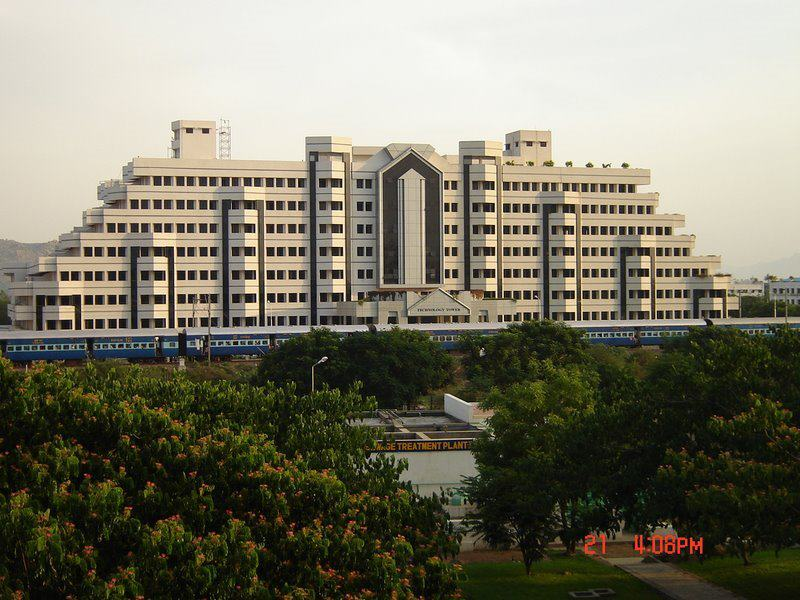
- Vellore Fort Javadi Hills Jalakandeswarar Temple Srilakshmi Golden Temple Assumption Cathedral Christian Medical College & Hospital Vellore Institute of Technology

- Vellore, Tamil Nadu Vellore (India)
- Coordinates: 12.916500°N 79.132500°E
- Country: India
- State: Tamil Nadu
- Region: Tondai Nadu
- District: Vellore

Government
  - Body: Vellore Municipal Corporation

Area
  - Urban: 153.14 km^{2} (59.13 sq mi)
  - City: 87.91 km^{2} (33.94 sq mi)
- Elevation: 239 m (784 ft)

Population (2011)
  - city and municipal corporation: 504,079
  - Rank: 7th
  - Urban: 484,690
  - Urban density: 3,165.0/km^{2} (8,197.3/sq mi)
- Demonym(s): Vellorekaran, Vellorian

Language
  - Official: Tamil, English
- Time zone: UTC+5:30 (IST)
- PIN: 632 ×××
- Telephone code: 91-416
- Vehicle registration: TN 23
- Website: vcmc.in

Vellore (Tamil: ['ʋeːluːɾ] WAY-loor), also spelled Velur, (Note: Vellore is the British English spelling, and Vēlūr is the romanized spelling from Tamil script.) is a city and municipal corporation in the Indian state of Tamil Nadu. It is the administrative headquarters of Vellore district. Located on the banks of the Palar River, it is surrounded by the Javadi Hills, an extension of the Eastern Ghats. The city covers an area of 76.09 km^{2} (29.38 sq mi), and is further sub-divided into 60 wards across four zones. It is administered by the Vellore Municipal Corporation, headed by a mayor, who is elected by the councilors of the respective wards. As of the 2011 census, the city had a population of 315,128. It is a part of the Vellore Lok Sabha constituency, which elects its Member of Parliament to the Lok Sabha, and the Vellore state assembly constituency that elects its member to the Tamil Nadu Legislative Assembly.

The early history of Vellore dates back to the Chola period in the 9th century CE. It was part of various empires during the Middle Ages. The Vellore Fort and the Jalakandeswarar Temple, were built during the reign of the Vijayanagara Empire in the 16th century CE. In the 18th century, Vellore was involved in the Carnatic Wars between the British and the French, and the Anglo-Mysore Wars between the British and the Mysore Kingdom. During the first half of the 19th century, it came under British rule. The Vellore Mutiny took place in 1806, and was the first large scale mutiny of the Indian sepoys against the British. The city was part of the Madras Presidency under the British Raj until 1947, after which it became part of the Indian state of Madras, which was later renamed as Tamil Nadu.

As of 2020, Vellore had a GDP of $4 billion. The economy is dependent on agriculture, and leather, tobacco, and other manufacturing industries. The town is known as the leather hub of India, with hundreds of tanneries located around the city. Leather exports from the region accounted for more than 37% of India's leather exports and leather-related products in the early 2010s. The city has a robust healthcare and educational infrastructure and is home to the Christian Medical College & Hospital, and the Vellore Institute of Technology.

Vellore is one of the cities chosen as a part of the Smart Cities Mission, an urban renewal programme by the Government of India. As per the Global Cities Index by Oxford Economics in 2024, the city was ranked as the 24th best city in India.

== Etymology ==
According to a legend, many babul trees (known locally as velan trees) surrounded this region, which led to the name 'Vellore'.

Another myth states that the Hindu god Murugan, with the Tamil epithet "Velan" (Spear-lord) came to Vellore during his anger, giving the town its name.

Vellore is also known as the Second Madras because of its importance and location relative to Chennai (Madras).

== History ==
The recorded history of Vellore dates back to the ninth century, as seen from a Chola inscription in the Annamalaiyar Temple in Tiruvannamalai.

Vellore is strategically located and well-connected by rail and bus routes to major towns in the neighbouring states of Andhra Pradesh, Karnataka and Kerala. Many dynasties and rulers dominated Vellore throughout its history, including the Pallava dynasty, Medieval Cholas, Later Cholas, the Rashtrakuta dynasty, the Sambuvaraya chieftains, Vijayanagar, the Nawabs of the Carnatic, and the administration of the British. In the 18th century, Vellore was involved in the Carnatic Wars between Britain and France. It was situated close to several decisive battles, including those at Ambur (1749), Arcot (1751), and Vandavasi (1760). During the first half of the 19th century, the town came under British rule.

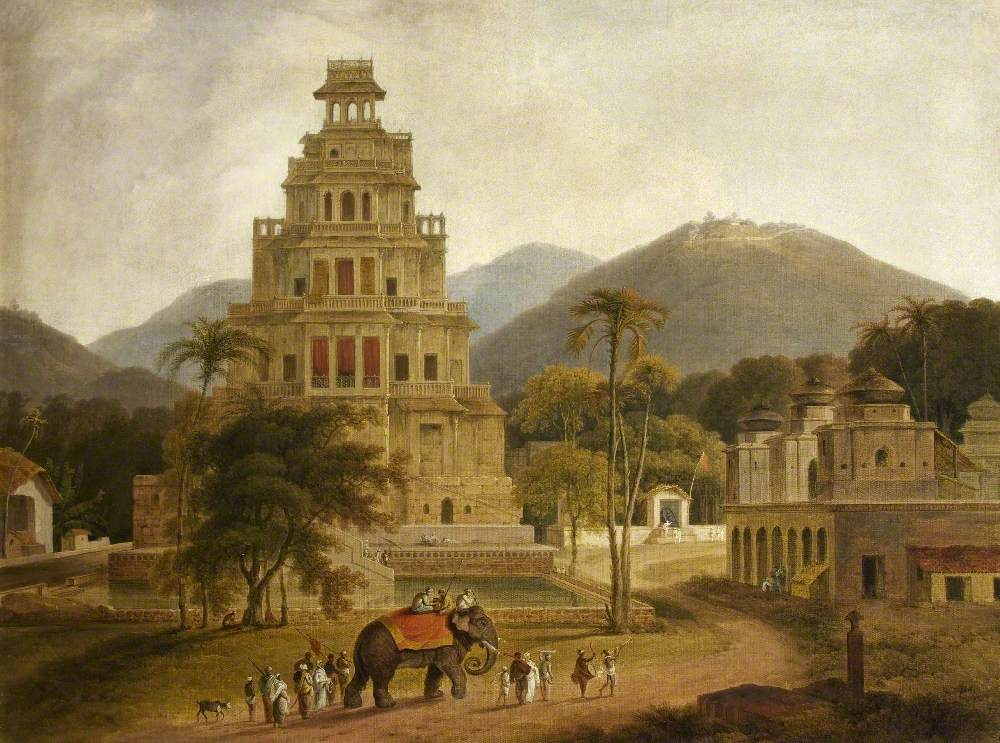
Thomas Daniell (1749-1840) - The Fort of Vellore in the Carnatic, India

Vellore Fort is important to Vellore's history. Due to a lack of historical records, it is not known exactly when the fort was constructed, but estimates based on stone inscriptions suggests that the fort was most likely built during the rule of Chinna Bommi Nayak between 1526 and 1595. The fort is a good example of Tamil Nadu military architecture, while the Jalakandeswarar Temple within the fort represents Vijayanagara architecture.

Christian Medical College & Hospital, founded in 1900 by the American medical missionary Dr. Ida S. Scudder, is another Vellore landmark. The hospital has grown into a medical institution of international repute.

The central prison in Vellore, established in 1830, had imprisoned notable Indian independence activists like C. Rajagopalachari and Ramaswamy Venkataraman. Other landmarks include the Shashankinians mausoleums, located close to the section of National Highway 48 between Vellore and Arcot, where the family members of Tipu Sultan were buried; and the Muthu Mandapam, a memorial on the banks of Palar River built by the Tamil Nadu Government to honor Sri Vikrama Rajasinha, the last ruler of the Kingdom of Kandy in Sri Lanka, who ruled from 1798 to 1815 and was imprisoned in Vellore Fort for 17 years until his death.

=== Vellore Fort ===
The fort of Vellore was built around 1566 CE by the chieftains of Sadashiv Raya of the Vijayanagara Empire. In the mid-17th century the fort was owned by various parties. The Aravidus, the last dynasty that ruled Vijayanagara lost Vellore to the Bijapur Sultan before being captured by the Marathas after a siege that lasted four and a half months in 1676. The fort came under the charge of Dost Ali, the Nawab of Carnatic, before passing on to the British in 1760. Vellore Fort withstood Hyder Ali's siege from 1780 to 1782, and would later become the base for Lord Cornwallis' march on Bangalore to defeat Tipu Sultan.

When Tipu Sultan was killed at Sringapatam during the Fourth Anglo-Mysore War (1798-79 CE), his kingdom was handed back to the Hindu Wodeyar kings of Mysore and the British exiled Tipu's surviving sons, daughters, their families, and their entire entourage to Vellore Fort. They stayed in the palaces in the fort and participated in the mutiny of 1806.

=== Vellore mutiny ===
In 1805, the new Commander-in-Chief of the Madras Army of the British East India Company, General Sir John Cradock, began an ambitious reform of the army's disciplinary system. New, standardized regulations were approved for the Madras Army, which dictated how sepoys should wear their uniforms and appear on duty. Under these regulations, Hindus were prohibited from wearing religious marks on their foreheads while on duty, and Muslims were required to shave their beards and trim their moustaches. One change that was especially problematic was a new headdress associated with Indian converts to Christianity, which included a leather cockade. This caused an uproar, as leather was a cultural taboo for the upper caste sepoys of the Madras Army. As a result, many sepoys believed that their British officers were conspiring to convert them to Christianity.

In May 1806, a few soldiers protested against these changes and were sent to Fort St. George in Chennai, where they were publicly lashed and discharged from the army. With the levels of resentment towards the British already high, the sons of the deceased Tipu Sultan exacerbated the conflict by assisting the mutineers who revolted on 10 July. Under the pretense of attending the wedding of one of Tipu Sultan's daughters, mutineers gathered in Vellore Fort where the wedding was held and revolted. Raising the flag of the Kingdom of Mysore, they declared Tipu Sultan's son Fateh Hyder king. The mutineers inflicted about 200 casualties before their revolt was put down by reinforcements under the command of Sir Hugh Robert Rollo Gillespie; many of the mutineers were captured and summarily executed or court-martialed.

As a result of the uprising, the dress codes were retracted, and Cradock was dismissed. Although the mutiny took place before larger revolts in the 1850s, it was indicative of the simmering dissent in the Indian soldiery. The Vellore mutiny is considered to be the first large-scale Indian mutiny against the British, and a prelude to the much larger Sepoy Mutiny in 1857.

In the 1930s, a series of communal riots occurred between Hindus and Muslims.

== Economic, social and cultural changes in the 20th century ==
The economic condition of the district in the earlier stages was not sound with the absence of major industries. Industries like Bharat Heavy Electricals Limited in Ranipet and the Tamil Nadu Industrial Explosives Limited, and the locality of Katpadi were established as the result of government policy. There has been notable growth of small scale industries and tanneries in the district, which has generated employment opportunities and benefitted farmers. Uzhavar Santhai is a useful market window for farmers. Women-driven self help groups have played an important role in building the rural economy and teaching rural women to be self-reliant. Vellore has also seen a period of upward social growth with improvement in literacy and the local economy. Literacy improved in part due to the Arivoli Movement.

== Geography and climate ==
Vellore is at 12.92°N 79.13°E, 220m above sea level. The city has a tropical savanna climate. It is in the Vellore district of the South Indian state, Tamil Nadu, 135 km (84 mi) west of the state capital Chennai and 30 km (19 mi) south of its twin city Chittoor, across the Andhra Pradesh border. Vellore lies in the Eastern Ghats region and Palar river basin. The topography is almost flat with slope from west to east.

Vellore has a tropical savanna climate (Köppen climate classification Aw). The temperature ranges from 13 °C (55 °F) to 39.4 °C (102.9 °F). Like the rest of the state, April to June are the hottest months and December to January are the mildest. Vellore receives 1,034.1 mm (40.71 in) of rainfall every year. The southwestern monsoon from June to September brings 517.1 millimetres or 20.36 inches of rainfall, with September being the rainiest month. The northeastern monsoon which lasts from October to December brings 388.4 millimetres or 15.29 inches of rainfall. The humidity ranges from 40%–63% during summer and 67%–86% during winter.

Climate data for Vellore (1991-2020, extremes 1901-2012)
Month	Jan	Feb	Mar	Apr	May	Jun	Jul	Aug	Sep	Oct	Nov	Dec	Year
Record high °C (°F)	35.3 (95.5)	39.8 (103.6)	42.8 (109.0)	44.4 (111.9)	45.0 (113.0)	44.3 (111.7)	40.9 (105.6)	39.4 (102.9)	39.6 (103.3)	39.2 (102.6)	35.8 (96.4)	35.0 (95.0)	45.0 (113.0)
Mean daily maximum °C (°F)	29.9 (85.8)	32.8 (91.0)	36.2 (97.2)	38.3 (100.9)	39.2 (102.6)	36.7 (98.1)	35.2 (95.4)	34.4 (93.9)	33.9 (93.0)	32.3 (90.1)	29.9 (85.8)	28.8 (83.8)	33.9 (93.0)
Mean daily minimum °C (°F)	18.0 (64.4)	19.1 (66.4)	21.8 (71.2)	24.8 (76.6)	26.0 (78.8)	25.5 (77.9)	24.9 (76.8)	24.3 (75.7)	23.8 (74.8)	22.8 (73.0)	20.9 (69.6)	18.6 (65.5)	22.5 (72.5)
Record low °C (°F)	10.2 (50.4)	12.0 (53.6)	12.1 (53.8)	13.8 (56.8)	18.1 (64.6)	19.6 (67.3)	18.8 (65.8)	18.7 (65.7)	18.7 (65.7)	15.6 (60.1)	12.1 (53.8)	11.0 (51.8)	10.2 (50.4)
Average rainfall mm (inches)	6.8 (0.27)	5.5 (0.22)	11.4 (0.45)	30.5 (1.20)	63.8 (2.51)	89.9 (3.54)	104.9 (4.13)	144.9 (5.70)	183.8 (7.24)	167.4 (6.59)	165.4 (6.51)	75.8 (2.98)	1,050.1 (41.34)
Average rainy days	0.6	0.4	0.6	1.7	4.4	5.0	5.9	8.0	8.7	9.2	7.9	3.6	56.0
Average relative humidity (%) (at 17:30 IST)	56	49	43	43	48	51	55	60	65	71	73	67	57
Source: India Meteorological Department

== Demographics ==
Religious census (2011)
Religion	Percent(%)
Hindu	80.09%
Muslim	14.28%
Christian	4.79%
Jain	0.51%
Buddhist	0.03%
Sikh	0.02%
Other	0.53%
No religion	0.02%

Language census
Language	Percent(%)
Tamil	93.45%
Telugu	5.96%
Urdu	0.9%

Historical population
Year	Pop.	±%
1961	113,742	—
1971	139,082	+22.3%
1981	174,257	+25.3%
1991	175,061	+0.5%
2001	177,413	+1.3%
2011	504,079	+184.1%
Sources: 1961 – 2001; 2011

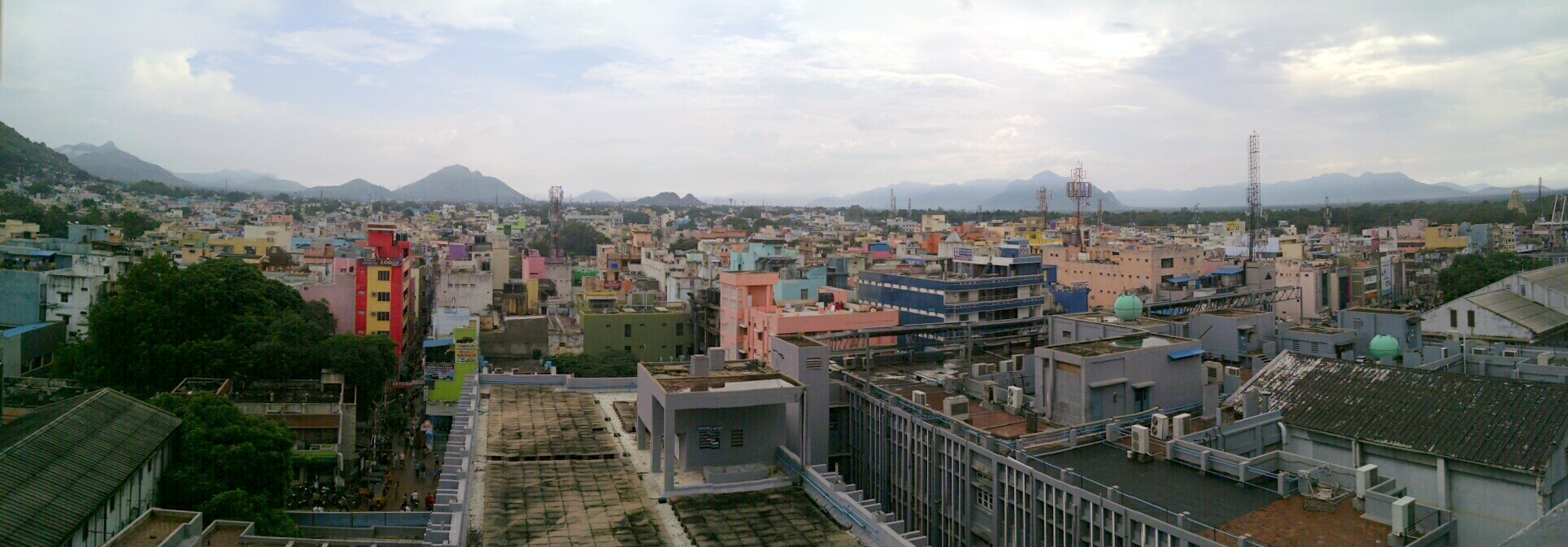
A view of the city

According to 2011 census, Vellore had a population of 504,079 of which 247,002 are males and 257,077 are females. The sex-ratio of Vellore is 1,009 females for every 1,000 males, much above the national average of 926. A total of 48,547 were under the age of six, constituting 24,692 males and 23,855 females. The literacy rate of Vellore is 87.09%, which is higher than national urban average of 85%. Literacy rate for males and females stood at 92.03% and 82.23% respectively. Total literates in Vellore were 379,849 of which males were 199,247 and remaining 180,602 were females. The city had a total of 112,486 households, with 70,257 workers, including 297 cultivators, 395 main agricultural labourers, 4,387 in household industries, 59,281 other workers, 5,897 marginal workers, 59 marginal cultivators, 74 marginal agricultural labourers, 667 marginal workers in household industries, and 5,097 other marginal workers.

According to the religious census of 2011, Vellore's population was 80.09% Hindu, 14.28% Muslim, 4.79% Christian, 0.02% Sikh, 0.03% Buddhist, 0.51% Jain, with 0.26% following other religions, and 0.02% following no religion or not indicating any religious preference.

As of 2001, 69.88% of the city's land area was developed. Out of the developed area, 55.76% was used for residential purposes, 8.34% for commerce, 1.58% for industry, 3.3% for education, 16.46% for public and semi-public use, and 10.12% for transport and communication. Although population density varies between different areas, the average density of the city of Vellore is 241 persons per hectare.

== Administration and politics ==
Municipal corporation officials
Mayor
Commissioner	P. Janaki Raveendran
Deputy Mayor
Elected members
Member of Legislative Assembly	P.Karthikeyan
Member of Parliament	Kathir Anand

Vellore is the municipal headquarters of Vellore district. The town was first recognized as a third-grade municipality in 1866, promoted to first-grade in 1947, to selection-grade in 1970, and to a municipal corporation on 1 August 2008. The functions of the Vellore Municipal Corporation are divided into six departments: General Administration/Personnel, Engineering, Revenue, Public Health, Planning, and Information Technology (IT). These departments are under the executive control of a municipal commissioner. Legislative powers are held by a body of 60 members, with each councilor being elected from one of the city's wards. The legislative body is headed by an elected mayor who is assisted by a deputy mayor.

Vellore is a part of the Vellore, Katpadi and Anaicut assembly constituencies and elects 3 members to the Tamil Nadu Legislative Assembly once every five years. Since the 1977 elections, All India Anna Dravida Munnetra Kazhagam (AIADMK) won the assembly elections in 1977 and 2009, while Dravida Munnetra Kazhagam (DMK) won seats in 1980, 1984 and 1989. Elections were won twice by the Indian National Congress (INC), in 1991 and 2001, while the Tamil Maanila Congress (TMC) secured seats in 1996 and 2001. The current MLA of Vellore constituency is Mr. P. Karthikeyan, Katpadi constituencyis Mr. Duraimurugan and Aniacut constituency is Mr. Nandakumar all from DMK.

Vellore is a part of the Vellore and Arakkonam Lok Sabha constituencies. It consisted of the following six assembly constituencies before 2009: Katpadi, Gudiyatham, Pernampattu, Anaicut, Vellore and Arni. After the 2009 reorganization, it is composed of Vellore, Anaicut, Kilvazhithunaiankuppam, Gudiyatham, Vaniyambadi and Ambur constituencies.

Since 1951, the Vellore parliament seat was won by the Indian National Congress four times in the 1957, 1962, 1989 and 1991 elections; AIADMK twice during the 1984 and 2014 elections; CWL once during 1951 elections; independent once during the 1980 elections; Dravida Munnetra Kazhagam five times during the 1967, 1971, 1996, 2004 and 2009 elections; once each by NCO during the 1977 elections; and twice by Pattali Makkal Katchi (PMK) during the 1998 and 1999 elections. The current Member of Parliament from the constituency is Kathir Anand from the DMK party.

Law enforcement in Vellore is organized by the Vellore subdivision of the Tamil Nadu Police headed by a deputy superintendent. There are four police stations in the city, one of them being an all-women station. Different special task forces focus on prohibition enforcement, district crime, and social justice and human rights. Administrative duties are performed by a branch that operates at the district level and is headed by a superintendent.

== Economy ==
The GDP of Vellore is $4 billion as of 2020. According to the Indian Census of 2001, the urban workforce employment rate of Vellore is 43.64%. Vellore, being the headquarters of the district, has registered growth in its tertiary sector activities with a corresponding decrease in the primary sector. Most employment is provided by the leather industry, tobacco industry, agricultural trading, and industries in and around the city. Approximately 83.35% of the workforce is employed in the tertiary sector comprising transport, services and commerce. The secondary sector activities like manufacturing and household industries employs 13.52% of the workforce. Male worker employment (43.64%) is higher than female work employment (24.39%).

Vellore is known as the leather hub of India. Hundreds of leather and tannery facilities are around Vellore and nearby towns, such as Ranipet, Ambur and Vaniyambadi. The Vellore district is the top exporter of finished leather goods in the country. Vellore leather accounts for more than 37% of the country's export of leather and leather-related products (such as finished leathers, shoes, garments and gloves). Bharat Heavy Electricals Limited (BHEL) is one of the nine major government owned enterprises in the nation. The Boiler Auxiliaries Plant of BHEL in Ranipet is the industrial hub of Vellore. Chemical plants in the Ranipet-SIPCOT economic zone are a major source of income to residents. EID Parry is a sanitary-ware manufacturing company with 38% of the world's market share in bathroom accessories. Tirumalai Chemicals and Greaves are among the international brands that have manufacturing units in the city. Automobile and mechanical companies of global brands, including SAME Deutz-Fahr, TVS–Brakes India, Mitsubishi, Greaves Cotton and MRF have their manufacturing units in the area. Brakes India Sholingur's foundry division is located at Vellore-Sholingur and is a major employer in the area. Asia's biggest explosives manufacturing company, Tamil Nadu Explosives Limited (TEL), is in Vellore at Katpadi. This is India's only government explosives company with more than a thousand employees. The company is headed by a senior Indian Administrative Service officer. Kramski Stamping and Molding India Pvt Ltd, a German precision metal and plastic integrated-component manufacturing company with automotive, telecommunications, electronics and medical applications is located in Erayankadu, near Vellore. Major businesses in the city center are on Officer's Line, Town Hall Road, Long Bazaar and Bangalore, Scudder, Arni, Gandhi and Katpadi Roads. Many boarding and lodging houses are in and around Scudder and Gandhi Roads. Microsoft Corporation (India) Pvt. Ltd. announced the launch of 14 Microsoft Innovation Centers (MICs) in India. Trichy, Vellore, Coimbatore, Madurai and Salem in Tamil Nadu.

Christian Medical College & Hospital (CMCH), on Ida Scudder Road in the heart of the city, is Vellore's largest private employer and has a large floating population from other parts of India and abroad. Lodging, hospitals and allied businesses are among the major sources of income generated in the central part of the city. The Government Vellore Medical College and Hospital (VMCH) are located at Adukamparai in Vellore. With hospitals such as Apollo KH Hospital in Melvisharam and Sri Narayani Hospital & Research Centre in Sripuram, coupled with colleges such as CMC & VIT and other engineering and science colleges, the health care industry is growing rapidly.

Naruvi Hospitals is a private hospital built at a cost of 3300 million INR, a joint venture between Vellore-based Pearl Human Care and Detroit-based Henry Ford Health. Sri Narayani Aayurvedic Centre was inaugurated by the Union Minister of State for AYUSH Shripad Yesso Naik in August 2019.

Rural industries other than agriculture include weaving, beedi and matchstick rolling. The Indian Armed Forces has a number of recruits from the Vellore district, especially from Kammavanpet (known as "the military village"). Military spending is a major source of income.

== Education ==
Vellore is considered a prominent destination for medical and technological education in India. It has a state-government university, a private technological university, one government and one private medical school and several engineering and arts and science colleges.

The country's first stem-cell translational research centre was established in Vellore in December 2005. The central government's biotechnology department selected the Christian Medical College (CMC) as the first in a series of centers as it already had world-class clinical hematology and biochemistry departments. The college made a breakthrough which attracted the attention of the country's medical and scientific community: the Centre for Stem Cell Research at the Christian Medical College succeeded in reprogramming cells from adult mice to make them function like stem cells found in the human embryo. The agricultural research station at Virinjipuram is in the Northeastern Zone of Tamil Nadu. It is one of 32 research stations of Tamil Nadu Agricultural University (TNAU). The Government of India-sponsored National Watershed Development Project for Rainfed Areas (NWDPRA) scheme has been in operation since October 1997, and it makes conservation measures conducted in water and soil of 18 watersheds in the Vellore and Tiruvannamalai districts.

Thiruvalluvar University was split off from the University of Madras and is located near Vallimalai, Vellore. Most government-run arts and science colleges in Vellore, Tiruvannamalai, Villupuram and Cuddalore districts are affiliated with Thiruvalluvar University. Thanthai Periyar Government Institute of Technology is the only government engineering college in Vellore. The Vellore Institute of Technology (VIT) has been ranked as one of the best private engineering universities in India by the India Today magazine. It was established under Section 3 of the University Grants Commission (UGC) Act, 1956, and was founded in 1984 as a self-financing institution called the Vellore Engineering College. The Union Ministry of Human Resources Development conferred University status on Vellore Engineering College in 2001.

Christian Medical College & Hospital (CMCH), one of the largest hospitals in India and Asia, is based out of Vellore. It is a major health care provider for the surrounding districts.

Auxilium Women's College (founded in 1954) is the first women's college in Vellore district; Other arts and sciences colleges in the city are the Dhanabakyam Krishnaswamy Mudhaliar Women's College (DKM) near Sainathapuram and the Muthurangam Government Arts College (MGAC) in Otteri, near Bagayam. Voorhees College (founded 1898) is the oldest college in the district and known as the institution where Sarvepalli Radhakrishnan (former president of India) studied; a commemorative stamp for the centenary of the college was issued by the government of India. C. Abdul Hakeem College is in Melvisharam. Arignar Anna Arts College for Women (AAA) is located in Walajapet.

The Government Law College was established in 2008. It offers a three-year Bachelor of Laws (BL) degree with an annual intake of 80 students. The college is in Katpadi, Vellore. There are several Arabic colleges in Vellore such as the Madrasa Al-Baqiyathus Salihath (popularly known as Baaqiyaath), founded by Shah Abdul Wahhab and is the second oldest Arabic college in India after Darul Uloom Deoband in Uttar Pradesh.

Schieffelin Institute of Health – Research and Leprosy Centre (SIH-R & LC) is located near Vellore and was established in 1955 to care for leprosy patients. The institute is named in honor of the American philanthropist William Jay Schieffelin, who played a key role in its founding.

== Tourism ==
Vellore Fort is the most prominent landmark in the city. During British rule, Tipu Sultan's family and the last king of Sri Lanka, Vikrama Rajasinha, were held as royal prisoners in the fort. The fort houses a church, a mosque and a Hindu temple, the latter known for its carvings. The first rebellion against British rule erupted at this fort in 1806, and it witnessed the massacre of the Vijayanagara royal family of Emperor Sriranga Raya. The fortifications consist of a main rampart, broken at irregular intervals by round towers and rectangular projections. The main walls are built of massive granite stones, surrounded by a broad moat fed with water by subterranean pipes from the Suryagunta reservoir.

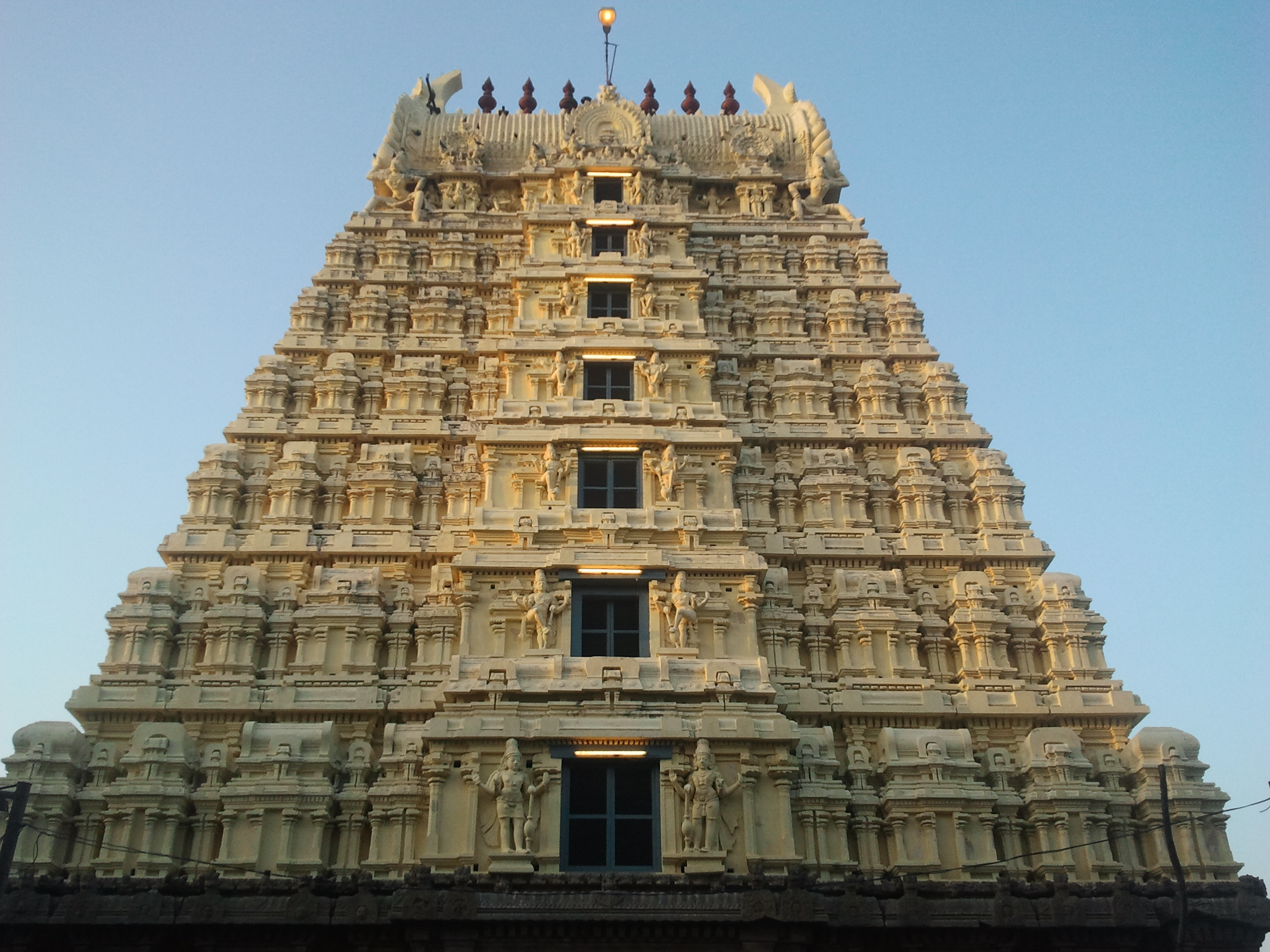
Gopuram of the Jalakandeswarar Temple

Within the fort is the similarly aged Jalakanteswara Temple. The fort houses the Tipu Mahal where Tipu Sultan is believed to have stayed with his family during the war with the British; the graves of Tipu's sons are found at Vellore. It is managed by the Archaeological Survey of India. Vellore Fort has been declared a Monument of National Importance and is a famous tourist attraction.

The State Government Museum is inside the fort and opened to the public in 1985. It consists of art, archaeology, prehistory, weapons, sculptures, bronzes, wood carvings, handicrafts, numismatics, philately, botany, geology, and zoology exhibits. Historical monuments of the North Arcot District are contained in the gallery. Special exhibits include a double bronze sword from Vellore Taluk dating to 400 BCE, stone sculptures from the late Pallava to Vijayanagar periods, ivory chess boards and coins used by the last Kandian King of Sri Lanka, Vikrama Raja Singha. Educational activities at the museum include an art camp for school students and the study of inscriptions and iconography for college students.

== Transport ==
=== Road ===
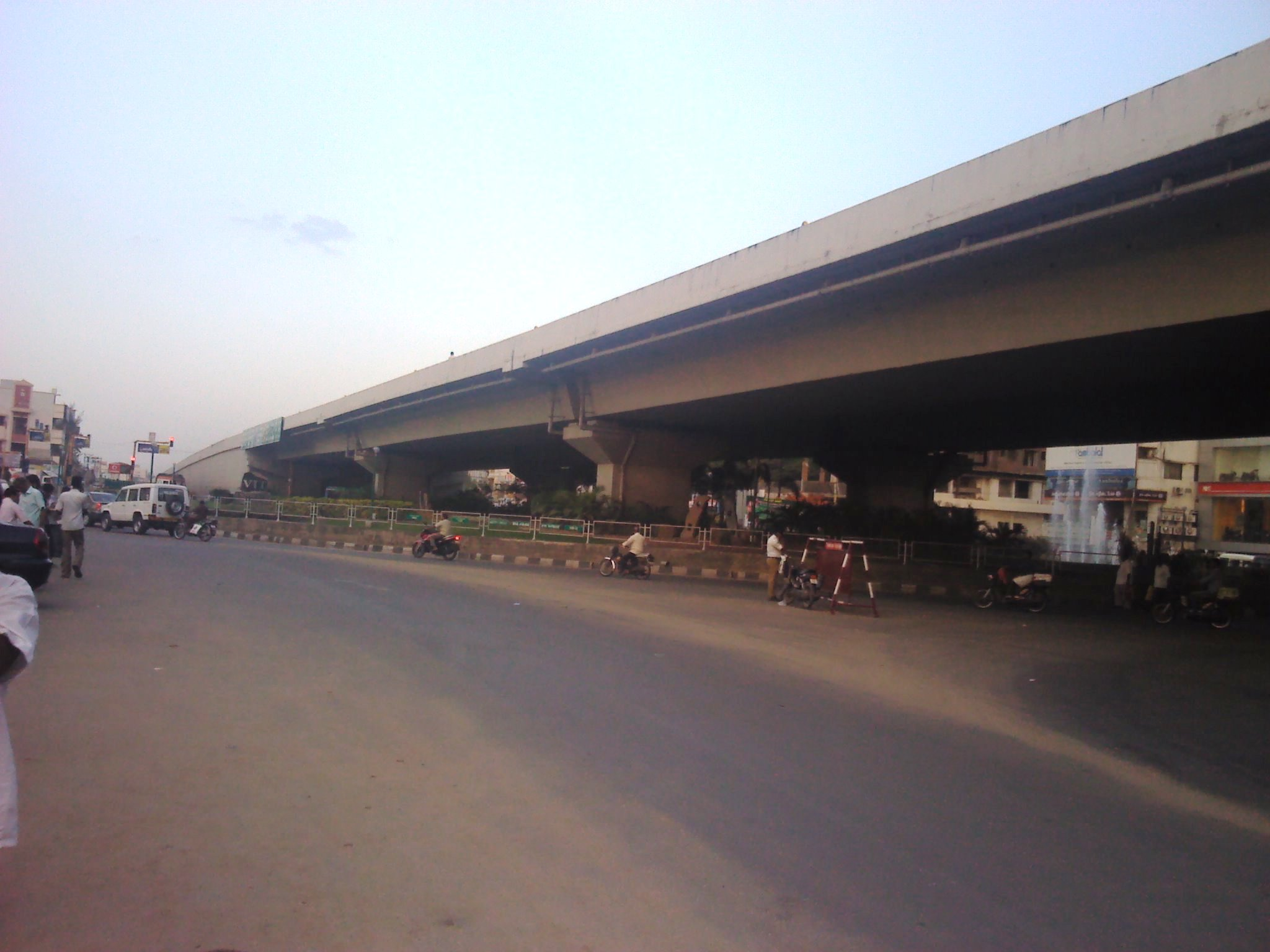
NH 48 Green Circle Junction (Central Bus Terminus) flyover in Vellore City

The Vellore municipal corporation maintains 104.332 km (64.829 mi) of roads. It has 50.259 km (31.229 mi) of concrete road, 6.243 km (3.879 mi) of kutcha road and 47.88 km (29.75 mi) of bituminous road. The National Highways passing through or terminating at Vellore as per new numbering are:

Highway number	Destination	Via
48	Chennai	Kanchipuram, Sriperumbudur,
48	Delhi	Bengaluru, Pune, Mumbai, Vadodara, Udaipur, Jaipur
38	Thoothukudi	Tiruvannamalai, Tiruchirappalli, Madurai
40	Hyderabad	Chittoor, Kadapa, Kurnool
75	Mangaluru	Gudiyattam, Pernambut, Venkatagirikota, Kolar, Bengaluru, Hassan, Sakleshpura

Vellore is connected with major cities in the states of Tamil Nadu, Andhra Pradesh and Karnataka. Bus service is available to Chennai, Coimbatore, Bangalore, Thiruvananthapuram, Tirupathi, Kadapa, Anantapur, Salem, Chittoor, Kuppam, Kolar, Kolar Gold Fields, Madanapalle, Vijayawada, Hyderabad, Mangalore, Karur, Kumbakonam, Aranthangi, Mannargudi, Nagapattinam, Hosur, Marthandam, Thoothukudi, Thiruchendur, Sengottai, Cuddalore, Kurnool, Kadiri, Trichy, Thuraiyur, Thammampatti, Thiruvannamalai, Tindivanam, Pondicherry, Kallakkurichi, Tirupattur, Viluppuram, Kanyakumari, Arani, Madurai, Tirunelveli, Kanchipuram, Arakkonam, Tiruttani, Kalpakkam, Pallikonda, Ponnai, Gudiyatham, Dharmapuri, Erode, Tirupur, Palakkad, Krishnagiri, Mumbai Gingee and other major towns and cities in South India. Vellore is served by a city bus service, which connects the city, suburbs, and other places of interest. The bus service extends about 30 km from the city center. There are two bus terminals: the Town Bus Terminus (opposite the fort and near CMC Hospital) and the Central Bus Terminus (near Green Circle). Other bus terminals are located at Chittor Bus Stand (near VIT Road), Bagayam and Katpadi (Junction bus stop). The bus stands are maintained by the Vellore Municipal Corporation. Vellore New Integrated Bus Terminus was constructed at a cost of ₹46.51 crore in a 9.25-acre area under the Smart City project by the Vellore City Municipal Corporation, it was completed in 24 months and become operational by January 2022.

=== Rail ===
Vellore has three main railway stations: Katpadi Junction, Vellore Cantonment and Vellore Town. The largest is Katpadi Junction (5 km north of CMC hospital). It is a major railway junction on the Chennai-Bangalore broad-gauge line extending to many cities including Chennai, Bangalore, Tirupati, New Delhi, Howrah and Kanyakumari. There are direct rail links to Vijayawada Junction, Tirupati, Jhansi Junction, Bhubaneswar, Nagpur Junction, Bangalore, Coimbatore Junction, Lucknow Junction, Dehradun, Agartala, Ahmedabad Junction, Ludhiana Junction, Bhopal Junction, Mumbai Central, Mangalore Central, Tiruchirappalli Junction, Mayiladuthurai Junction, Chidambaram, Kumbakonam, Bilaspur Junction, Korba, Patna Junction, Ernakulam Junction, Thiruvananthapuram Central, Kanniyakumari, Shirdi, Kanpur Central, Gaya Junction, Dhanbad Junction, Jammu Tawi, Madurai, Durg Junction, Gwalior Junction, Chennai Central, Howrah Junction, New Delhi, Guwahati, Silchar, Madhupur Junction, Nagercoil Junction, Kozhikode, Kollam Junction, Bhagalpur Junction, Jaipur Junction, Dibrugarh, Varanasi Junction, Pune Junction, Hyderabad, Vishakapatnam and other major cities. More than 150 trains cross the Vellore-Katpadi Junction daily. 250 to 265 trains halt at this junction. It is a major and one of the busiest junctions in South India, and the most important railway station in Vellore district.

Vellore Cantonment is in Suriyakulam on the Viluppuram-Tirupati broad gauge line, 8 km from Katpadi Junction. EMU and passenger trains to Tirupati, Chennai and Arakonnam depart from here. The 150-km broad gauge line was extended to Villupuram in January 2010. It connects Vellore and South Tamil Nadu; however, as of January 2019 it is serviced by slow passenger trains. The line was opened for goods trains in June 2010. An EMU from Vellore Cantonment to Chennai Central was introduced on 22 December 2008. Vellore Town Station is in Konavattam on the line connecting Katpadi Junction with Viluppuram Junction via Tiruvannamalai.

=== Air ===
The Vellore Airport was established in 1934 and is located in Abdullapuram, 11 km away from the city centre. It had been used to land trainer aircraft and helicopters. It was reactivated as a part of the Airports Authority of India idle airports activation programme in July 2006 to facilitate regular flying by trainee pilots of the Madras Flying Club whose operations were restricted with the increase in scheduled aircraft movement at Chennai Airport. Vellore Airport is in the process of being revived under the Regional Connectivity Scheme (RCS). UDAN. Runway and terminal building works are under progress, and the required infrastructure works are ongoing for operations. In September 2023, it was reported that initial tests of signaling and other equipment were successful and that the airport would soon be opened for commercial flight operations.

== Sports ==
Vellore is known for producing number of national and international weightlifters, M Tamil Selvan, a silver medal winner at the 1978, 1982 Commonwealth games and represented India in 1980 Olympics.

Sathish Sivalingam, a gold medal winner at the 2014,2018 Commonwealth games. Vellore has the States first center of excellence for weightlifting. Built at an expense of 24 million INR, the centre has facilities for conducting international weightlifting events, latest training equipment and a multi-purpose training hall.

Vellore was among the two districts in Tamil Nadu which did not have a sports complex. In 2018, the Government of Tamil Nadu announced a sports complex would be set up with facilities for 400 metre athletics track, gallery, administrative office besides grounds for hockey, basketball, kabaddi, badminton and tennis. It would also have a swimming pool and gymnasium.

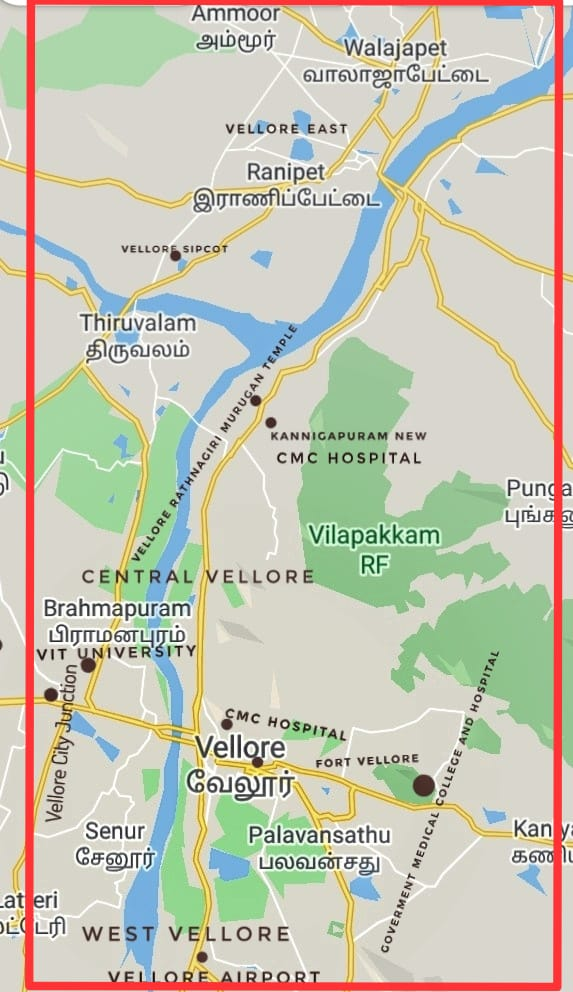
Vellore metropolitan area

== Utility services ==
Electricity supply to Vellore is regulated and distributed by the Tamil Nadu Electricity Board (TNEB). The city and its suburbs form the Vellore Electricity Distribution Circle. A chief distribution engineer is stationed at the regional headquarters. The water supply is provided by the Vellore municipal corporation from the Palar river through Palar headworks and Karungamputhur headworks and distributed through ten overhead tanks. As of 2005, there are 16,371 connections to 33,772 households. In 2000–2001, a total of 7.4 million litres of water was supplied daily for households in the city. The other sources of water are Otteri Lake, Sathuvancheri town panchayat, Ponnai and various street wells.

According to the municipal data for 2011, about 83 metric tonnes of solid waste are collected from Vellore every day by door-to-door collection. The source segregation and dumping are carried out by the sanitary department of the Vellore municipal corporation. The municipal corporation covered 16 wards for waste collection as of 2001. There is no underground drainage system and the sewage system for sullage disposal is through septic tanks, open drains and public conveniences. The municipal corporation maintained 145 km (90 mi) of storm water drains in 2011. As of 2011, 24 government and private hospitals and one veterinary hospital take care of the citizens' health care needs. As of 2011, the municipal corporation maintained 5,241 street lamps: 735 sodium lamps, 73 mercury vapour lamps, 4,432 tube lights and one high mast beam lamp. The municipal corporation operates the Netaji Daily Market, which caters to the needs of the city and the surrounding rural areas.

== See also ==
- List of areas of Vellore
- List of people from Vellore

== Sources ==
- Mack, Alexander (2002). Spiritual journey, imperial city: pilgrimage to the temples of Vijayanagara. New Delhi: Vedam e-books Pvt. Ltd. pp. 88–90. ISBN 81-7936-004-0.
- Conversion of City Corporate Plan to Business Plan for Vellore Corporation (PDF) (Report). Commissioner of Municipal Administration, Government of Tamil Nadu. 2008. Archived from the original (PDF) on 1 September 2011.
