= J. Hassain =

Member of the Tamil Nadu Legislative Assembly
- In office 1989–1991
- Preceded by: M. Kadirvelu
- Succeeded by: N. G. Venugopal
- Constituency: Ranipet

Personal details
- Born: 2 October 1943 Ranipet
- Party: Independent
- Education: C. Abdul Hakeem College (BA), Dr. Ambedkar Government Law College, Chennai (BL)
- Profession: Lorry Owner

J. Hassain (or J. Hassan) is an Indian politician and a former member of the Tamil Nadu Legislative Assembly. He hails from the Ranipet area of the Ranipet district. Hassain, who completed his Bachelor of Arts degree at C. Abdul Hakeem College in Melvisharam and his Bachelor of Law degree at Madras Law College (Chennai Law College). He contested as an independent candidate in the Ranipet assembly constituency in the 1989 Tamil Nadu Legislative Assembly election, won, and became a Member of the Legislative Assembly.

== Electoral performance ==
=== 1989 ===
1989 Tamil Nadu Legislative Assembly election: Ranipet
| Party | Candidate | Votes | % | ±% |
|---|---|---|---|---|
| Independent | J. Hassain | 27,724 | 30.08% | New |
| DMK | M. Kuppusami | 23,784 | 25.80% | −7.26 |
| AIADMK | S. Kovi Mohannan | 15,738 | 17.07% | New |
| INC | M. Kadirvel | 10,813 | 11.73% | −43.87 |
| Independent | L. Vilvanathan | 10,088 | 10.94% | New |
| Independent | C. Govindaraj | 1,755 | 1.90% | New |
| Independent | K. Selvaraj | 650 | 0.71% | New |
| Margin of victory | | 3,940 | 4.27% | −18.27% |
| Turnout | | 92,179 | 57.43% | −18.87% |
| Registered electors | | 164,533 | | |
| Independent gain from INC | | Swing | -25.52% | |
