= A. M. Munirathinam =

Indian politician

A. M. Munirathinam Mudaliyar is an Indian politician Member of the Legislative Assembly of Tamil Nadu. He was elected to the Tamil Nadu legislative assembly from Sholinghur constituency as an Indian National Congress (INC) candidate in the 1989 and 2016 and 1991 elections and as a Tamil Maanila Congress (TMC) candidate in 1996.

Munirathinam and his three brothers, including Ponnuranga, formed a staunch INC-supporting family that has dominated the political life of the mostly rural area of Sholinghur since the 1960s, with one or other of the brothers either winning or being runner-up in eight of the twelve state assembly elections between 1962 and 2011. They operate a private bus company that provides both local employment and much-needed cheap transport, and political scientist Adam Ziegfeld believes their "main source of influence seems to be their status as local notables - wealthy, powerful members of the community who are sources of employment and philanthropy".

Despite his strong allegiance to the INC, Munirathinam was among the many people in Tamil Nadu who deserted the party in favour of the newly formed TMC in 1996. He won in the 1996 elections but could not defend the seat in those of 2001 because an electoral pact between the TMC and All India Anna Dravida Munnetra Kazhagam (AIADMK) entailed that it would be contested by a candidate from the AIADMK and not by the TMC. He was president of the town panchayat when the TMC merged back into the INC after the death of its founder, G. K. Moopanar, and he then became district president of the INC. Despite his position, he was overlooked as a candidate in the 2006 elections, with the party instead nominating D. Arul Anbarasu, the son of Era. Anbarasu, a prominent INC politician at state level. He and his brothers stayed with the INC, who won the seat, but when Munirathinam was again overlooked by the party in favour of Anbarasu at the time of the 2011 elections, he opted to stand as an independent. He came second with 34 per cent of the vote, while Anbarasu was well behind in third place.

In 2021 Tamil Nadu State elections, Munirathinam won the election for 4th time with 26,698 votes defeating AM Krishnan of PMK party.

== Electoral performance ==
2021 Tamil Nadu Legislative Assembly election: Sholingur
Party	Candidate	Votes	%	±%
INC	A. M. Munirathinam	110,228	49.46%	17.28%
PMK	A. M. Krishnan	83,530	37.48%	
AMMK	N. G. Parthiban	12,979	5.82%	
NTK	Y. R. Pavendhan	9,656	4.33%	3.94%
MNM	R. Jawahar	1,664	0.75%	
NOTA	Nota	1,239	0.56%	−0.25%
Margin of victory		26,698	11.98%	7.37%
Turnout		2,22,870	80.33%	−1.70%
Rejected ballots		245	0.11%	
Registered electors		2,77,440		
INC gain from AIADMK		Swing	12.67%	

2016 Tamil Nadu Legislative Assembly election: Sholingur
Party	Candidate	Votes	%	±%
AIADMK	N. G. Parthiban	77,651	36.79%	
INC	A. M. Munirathinam	67,919	32.18%	11.59%
PMK	K. Saravanan	50,827	24.08%	
DMDK	P. R. Manogar	6,167	2.92%	−36.05%
NOTA	None Of The Above	1,691	0.80%	
BJP	Kumar. M	1,468	0.70%	
Margin of victory		9,732	4.61%	−0.42%
Turnout		2,11,064	82.03%	−2.69%
Registered electors		2,57,291		
AIADMK gain from DMDK		Swing	-2.19%	

2011 Tamil Nadu Legislative Assembly election: Sholingur
Party	Candidate	Votes	%	±%
DMDK	P. R. Manogar	69,963	38.98%	29.64%
Independent	A. M. Munirathinam	60,925	33.94%	
INC	Arulanbarasu	36,957	20.59%	−25.39%
Puratchi Bharatham	M. Bhavani.	3,858	2.15%	
Independent	T. V. Paramasivam	2,288	1.27%	
Independent	V. Velu	2,268	1.26%	
	A. M. Inbanathan	1,181	0.66%	
BSP	N. Dhinakaran	1,076	0.60%	
Independent	Vadivel	983	0.55%	
Margin of victory		9,038	5.04%	−0.70%
Turnout		2,11,864	84.72%	8.21%
Registered electors		1,79,499		
DMDK gain from INC		Swing	-7.00%	

1996 Tamil Nadu Legislative Assembly election: Sholingur
Party	Candidate	Votes	%	±%
TMC(M)	A. M. Munirathinam	65,361	54.33%	
PMK	Shanmugham. S.	31,431	26.13%	
INC	Jayababu. R.	20,849	17.33%	−36.57%
MDMK	Shanmugham. R.	1,557	1.29%	
Margin of victory		33,930	28.21%	−3.19%
Turnout		1,20,293	74.70%	4.13%
Registered electors		1,68,374		
TMC(M) gain from INC		Swing	0.43%	

1991 Tamil Nadu Legislative Assembly election: Sholingur
Party	Candidate	Votes	%	±%
INC	A. M. Munirathinam	58,563	53.90%	14.66%
DMK	C. Manickam	24,453	22.51%	−10.56%
PMK	P. Panchatcharam	22,600	20.80%	
BJP	M. K. Santha Kumar	1,543	1.42%	
Independent	N. Chandiran	620	0.57%	
Margin of victory		34,110	31.40%	25.22%
Turnout		1,08,647	70.57%	9.43%
Registered electors		1,58,696		
INC hold		Swing	14.66%	

1989 Tamil Nadu Legislative Assembly election: Sholingur
Party	Candidate	Votes	%	±%
INC	A. M. Munirathinam	33,419	39.24%	
DMK	C. Manickam	28,161	33.06%	−13.98%
AIADMK	C. Gopal	17,125	20.11%	−31.28%
AIADMK	Kanmani Porki Alias Selvaraj	3,692	4.33%	−47.05%
Independent	E. Nagarajan	728	0.85%	
Margin of victory		5,258	6.17%	1.84%
Turnout		85,171	61.14%	−17.49%
Registered electors		1,43,254		
INC gain from AIADMK		Swing	-12.15%	
