= A. Mohammed John =

Indian politician (died 2021)

MP of Rajya Sabha for Tamil Nadu
- In office 25 July 2019 – 23 March 2021
- Preceded by: K. R. Arjunan
- Succeeded by: M. M. Abdulla
- Constituency: Tamil Nadu

Minister of Backward Classes and Minority Welfare (Government of Tamil Nadu)
- In office 29 June 2011 – 17 June 2013
- Chief Minister: J. Jayalalithaa
- Preceded by: T. K. M. Chinnayya
- Succeeded by: S. Abdul Rahim

Member of Tamil Nadu Legislative Assembly
- In office 23 May 2011 – 22 May 2016
- Preceded by: R. Gandhi
- Succeeded by: R. Gandhi
- Constituency: Ranipet

Chairman of Tamil Nadu Waqf Board
- In office 19 September 2020 – 23 March 2021
- Preceded by: A. Anwhar Raajhaa
- Succeeded by: Abdul Rahman

Personal details
- Born: Panaikulam, Ramanathapuram, Tamil Nadu
- Died: 23 March 2021 (aged 72–73) Ranipet, Tamil Nadu
- Other political affiliations: All India Anna Dravida Munnetra Kazhagam

A. Mohammed John (1948/1949 – 23 March 2021) was an Indian industrialist and politician. He served as Member of Rajyasabha representing Tamil Nadu. He defeated R. Gandhi of DMK party in 2011 general elections. The then ADMK party supremo J. Jayalalitha discharged him from the minister post to reshuffle her ministry and the Backward class ministry was handed over to Abdur Rahim. He was into controversy among the Muslims of his constituency for supporting the Bill and voted in favour of NDA Government's citizenship amendment Bill and there were severe protests out of his home in Ranipet which were organized by Minorities. The Muslims who are indigenous residents of Ranipet removed him from all the posts that are related to Ahle-sunnath-jama'ath which saw a major setback in his political career. While on enquiry about why he backed Tamil Nadu Chief minister Edappadi.k.Pazhaniswamy on CAB he said that the party and the commands from the same are priority for him therefore the jamaath of Ranipet removed him from all the posts of Masjid of which he was a member before. He was a member of the 14th Tamil Nadu Legislative Assembly from the Ranipet constituency. He represented the All India Anna Dravida Munnetra Kazhagam party. He was minister of the state for the Backward Classes, Most Backward Classes and Minorities Welfare.

The elections of 2016 resulted in his constituency being won by R. Gandhi. He died on 23 March 2021, aged 72.

== Career ==
John was a successful industrialist in leather manufacturing and exports. He was born in Ranipet, Tamil Nadu. He was twice elected to Ranipet Municipality between 1996–2001 and 2001–2006.
