= Karivedu =

Karivedu karivelangadu
- Village
- Location in Tamil Nadu, India Karivedu (India)
- Coordinates: 12.8107°N 79.3882°E
- Country: India
- State: Tamil Nadu
- District: Ranipet District parliament_const = Arakonam
- Elevation: 115 m (377 ft)

Population (2011)
  - Total: 2,000

Languages
  - Official: Tamil
- Time zone: UTC+5:30 (IST)
- PIN: 632531
- Telephone code: 91-4172
- Vehicle registration: TN-23, TN-73
- Nearest city: Arcot
- Lok Sabha constituency: Sholingar
- Climate: hot (Köppen)
- Website: www.karivedu.blogspot.com

Karivedu is famed village is located in Ranipet district, Tamil Nadu. The initial present in the name of the village literally signifies the town Kalavai which is present nearby to the village. To discriminate karivedu from Vellore district the name is used by Karivelangadu. Karivedu is situated in between Arcot and Kalavai road. It is 15 km from Arcot and 8 km from Kalavai. It belongs to Arcot municipality and taluk. The postal pincode is 632506.

The seasonal river Palar flows on the north side of the village.

== Topography ==
The general slope is towards south east and the small streams that rise in Vellore Farming Lands situated in the west eventually fall into Lake. The topography of Karivedu village in plain and is situated at an altitude of 170.12 metres above mean sea level. The wind direction is predominant towards south west in the whole of the year. However, during summer it is from south west to north east.

== Climate ==
The taluk has fairly healthy climate. The study area has distinctly high temperature in hot months and cold weather is for a short duration.

The climatic seasons are generally classified as follows:

- Cold season from November to January with a mean maximum and minimum temperature of 29 C and 18.4 C respectively.
- Warm season from February to March and from July to October with a mean maximum and minimum temperature of 45 C and 30 C respectively.
- Hot season from April to June with a mean maximum and minimum temperature of 35 C and 27 C respectively.

The main maximum temperature during summer normal occurs in the month of May while the minimum temperature in winter occurs in January.

The north –east monsoon gives most of the rains. The average rainfall for a year is found to be 600 mm. The maximum rainfall occurs during the month of September and October due to north-east monsoon.

== Demographics ==
Religious census
Religion	Percent(%)
Hindu	99%
Muslim	0%
Christian	0.1%
Sikh	0.0%
Buddhist	0.0%
Jain	0.0%
Other	0.99%
No religion	0.0%

== Politics ==
R. Srinivasan is the sitting MLA and G. Hari is sitting Member of Parliament, both from Anna Dravida Munnetra Kazhagam (ADMK).

Karivedu is part of Arcot Assembly Constituency. Arcot assembly constituency is part of Arakkonam (Lok Sabha constituency). R. Srinivasan is the sitting Chairperson of the Municipality from ADMK.

== Transport ==
The main mode of transport is by bus since it is economical, and well connected by road. A national highway and two state highways pass through Nearby Arcot Town. There are frequent buses to almost all parts of Tamil Nadu. Buses depart every 15 minutes from Arcot Town to Chennai City and there are also buses to Hosur, Bangalore, Tirupathi, Pondicherry (Puducherry). There are lot of private bus operators as well, who provide services on local and short-distance routes. The nearest railway station to Karivedu is Walaja Road, which is around 15 km from Karivedu. There are buses (Route 202) Between Arani and Chennai very frequently and also straight buses (Route 123) between Arcot to Chennai. The local bus from Karivedu to Arcot Town is route no.31,32.Buses depart every 45–60 minutes from Arcot Town to Karivedu Village. Connectivity available on Arcot town Bus-stop In All Areas.

The nearest railway station is walajah Road station 15 km from the town lying between Arakkonam and Vellore-Katpadi Junction 40 km.

== Others ==
Sri Vaari Hi-Powers announced that Karivedu would soon be home to the largest solar plant in South India, once construction of 12 megawatt project was finished. Neighbouring villages are Sembedu, Ozhalai, Keerambaadi, K.Velur, Karikanthangal. The village is home to a population of around 1000 in around 400 households. The main occupations represented in the village is farming. The village has a pond and a lake; after the rainy season, villagers use the lake water and palar river for irrigation. One corporate bank is available in nearby the village, the bank offers loan facilities for farming families. The secondary occupation is Welding, Driver. One famous Government higher secondary school is also located in nearby the village. There is a volleyball ground in the back of the local School. Villagers hold Winter, Summer, Vocational volleyball tournaments against neighbouring village teams.

The route from Arcot to Kalavai en route these villages. Arcot→Mupathuvetti→Labbapettai→Maangaadu→Sarvanthangal→Laadavaram→Pilleri→Athithangal→Karivedu→K VELUR→Karikanthangal→Kalavai cut road→Allalcheri→Kalavai

The road links to Arcot→Cheyyar highway at Kalavai X road.

Some of the colleges for students are:

- Adhiparasakthi Engineering & Agricultural college, GB Nagar.
- SSS college of arts and science, Arcot.
- C.Abdul Hakeem Engineering college, Melvisharam.
- VIT University, Katpadi.
- Arinjar Anna Arivial college, Cheyyar.
- Thiruvalluvar University, Vellore.
- Periyar Engineering College, Vellore.
- M.M.E.S Women's Arts and Science College, Melvisharam.
- Global Institute of Engineering & Technology, Visharam.
- Sitheeswarar Polytechnic College, Arcot.
- AAA Women's college, Walajapet.

Some of the schools for students are:

- Government Higher Secondary School, K.velur.
- Government Girls Higher Secondary School, Arcot.
- Sri Ramakrishna Matriculation Higher Secondary School, Arcot.
- GVC Higher Secondary School, Arcot.
- Balsam Academy, Ranipet.
