= Arcot (disambiguation) =

Arcot is a town, near Chennai, in Tamil Nadu, India.

Arcot or Arkat may also refer to :

- Arcot block, a subdivision of the Arcot taluk
- Arcot taluk, a subdistrict of Vellore district, Tamil Nadu, India centred on the town
- Arcot State in the Carnatic region, where the above town was seat of the Nawabs of Arcot, during the early British Raj
- Arcot (State Assembly Constituency), in the Tamil Nadu legislative assembly
- North Arcot, former district under Madras Presidency, split in 1989 into present-day Tiruvannamalai District and Vellore District.
- South Arcot, former district under Madras Presidency, split in 1993 into Cuddalore District and Villupuram District.
- The Army Reserve Components Overseas Training Ribbon (ARCOT), a military award of the United States Army
