= C. Abdul Hakeem College =

College in Tamil Nadu, India

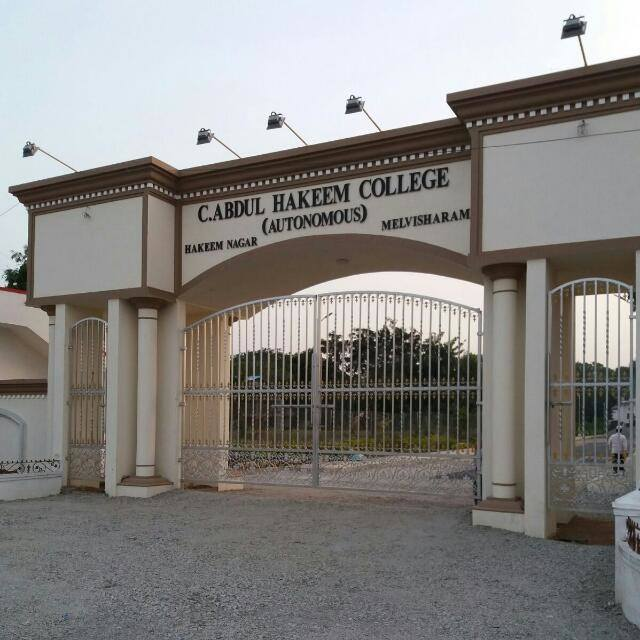
- Other names: سی عبدالحکیم کالج, CAHC
- Type: Government Aided Private Autonomous College
- Established: 1965
- Affiliations: Thiruvalluvar University, NAAC, AIU
- Chairman: S. Ziauddin Ahmed
- Principal: S. A. SAJID
- Location: Melvisharam, Tamil Nadu, India; 12.9073°N 79.2958°E
- Campus: Urban
- Website: www.cahc.edu.in

C. Abdul Hakeem College is a government aided private college for arts and science located in Melvisharam, Tamil Nadu, India. It is one of the oldest colleges in Ranipet district, affiliated to Thiruvalluvar University. The National Assessment and Accreditation Council has conferred A grade. Currently it offers 31 Courses at Under-Graduate level, 6 Courses at Post-Graduate level and Ph.D. programs. It was granted autonomous status by University Grants Commission with effect from 2014–2015 to 2019–2020.

== History ==
The C. Abdul Hakeem College was established in the year 1965 by the Melvisharam Muslim Educational Society (MMES) which was founded in 1918 by Late Nawab C. Abdul Hakeem. He was a businessman, philanthropist, one of the natives of Melvisharam and one time Sheriff of Madras. MMES started off with Primary, Secondary and Higher Education for people irrespective of caste, creed, community or social status. Presently, MMES manages 11 institutions from kindergarten school to a first grade college with five postgraduate departments and three research departments. They include M.M.E.S. arts and science college for women and C. Abdul Hakeem College of Engineering & Technology.

The college was instituted in the year 1965 with just Pre-University Course, in the local orphanage buildings. Subsequently, the M.M.E.S. acquired a site of more than 67 acres (27 ha), on the eastern outskirts of the town, on the Chennai-Bangalore Trunk road, and constructed buildings to house the college and the hostels.

== Campus ==
The college campus is spread over an area of about 21 acres (8.5 ha). The college has a double story building with different blocks which accommodate all the class rooms, office rooms, principal's chambers, separate staff rooms for various departments, laboratories, toilets, etc. Although there are sizable number of academic departments, the facilities are mostly shared. There is an auditorium which is also used for social, cultural, academic and government sponsored programs. A branch of the Centurion Bank with ATM facility is located in the nearby campus of the engineering college run by the same management. A sub-post office is functioning in the college campus. Although the institution is four decades old, the open land is to be fully converted into gardens or other useful buildings. Significant amount of rainwater is harvested using rainwater harvesting facility.

== Examinations ==
The exams are conducted as per Thiruvalluvar University exam regulations and codes. The question papers are drafted by the affiliated university and the answer papers are evaluated by a common evaluation method.

== Research and development ==
The college houses Aquatic Animal Health Laboratory the first OIE Reference Laboratory in India for white tail diseases primarily caused by White spot syndrome virus. Research is also done in the areas of materials, polymer chemistry, biodiversity, and other science topics.

== Student life ==
The college has three National Service Scheme (NSS) units with 155 cadets. These NSS units are subjected to community development, social work, health and hygiene awareness, medical camp, adult education and literacy, blood donation camp, AIDS awareness, environment awareness, etc. Three villages have been adopted for executing extension activities. The extension activities are planned and executed in collaboration with governmental organizations including the District Collectorate, District Employment office, District Industries Centre, Public Health Department, Police Department, Pollution Control Board, Town Panchayaths and NGOs.

Students have participated and won in several academic competitions and sports events. A number of other student clubs also exist to engage students in extra-curricular and co-curricular activities. So of them are,

- Tamil Association
- English Association
- Computer Association
- Mathematics Association
- Physics Association
- Commerce & Accountancy Association

== See also ==
- List of universities in India
- Universities and colleges in India
- Education in India
- List of Tamil Nadu Government's Educational Institutions
