= Kalavai =

- Panchayat Town
- Location in Tamil Nadu, India
- Coordinates: 12.68°N 79.42°E
- Country: India
- State: Tamil Nadu
- District: Ranipet
- Elevation: 138 m (453 ft)

Population (2011)
  - Total: 11,000

Languages
  - Official: Tamil
- Time zone: UTC+5:30 (IST)
- Postal code: 632506
- Vehicle registration: TN-23, TN-73

Kalavai is a panchayat town in Ranipet district in the Indian state of Tamil Nadu. The main occupation represented in the area is farming. The town has a pond and a lake after rainy season. Villagers use the lake water and palar river for irrigation. Corporation Bank, State Bank Of India and Indian Bank are the banks that have branches in the locality. The secondary occupation is garment outlets. One government higher secondary school is also located in a nearby village.

== Demographics ==
As of 2011 India census, Kalavai has a population of 11000 as on year 2011. Males constitute 50% of the population and females 53%. Kalavai has an average literacy rate of 68%, higher than the national average of 59.5%: male literacy is 71%, and female literacy is 59%. In Kalavai, 13% of the population is under 6 years of age.

== Climate ==
The taluk has fairly healthy climate. The study area has distinctly high temperature in hot months and cold weather is for a short duration.

The climatic seasons are generally classified as follows:

- Cold season from November to January with a mean maximum and minimum temperature of 30 °C and 21 °C respectively.
- Warm season from February to March and from July to October with a mean maximum and minimum temperature of 45 °C and 30 °C respectively.
- Hot season from April to June with a mean maximum and minimum temperature of 35 °C and 27 °C respectively.

The main maximum temperature during summer normal occurs in the month of May while the minimum temperature in winter occurs in January.

The north-east monsoon gives most of the rains. The average rainfall for a year is found to be 700 mm. The maximum rainfall occurs during the month of September and October due to north-east monsoon.

== Economy ==
Kalavai is the principal market for the surrounding agricultural area. It also has a viable local weaving industry and ground nut oil industry. Kalavai is also most famous for edible oil production, mainly focusing on groundnut oil production. More oil extractors are available in and around Arcot. There are number of rice mills and supermarkets are also available in the town.

== Demographics ==
Religious census
Religion	Percent(%)
Hindu	55%
Muslim	42%
Christian	3%

== Politics ==
J.L.Eswarappan is the sitting MLA and S. Jagathrakshakan is sitting Member of Parliament, both from Dravida Munnetra Kazhagam (DMK).

Kalavai is part of Arcot Assembly Constituency. Arcot assembly constituency is part of Arakkonam (Lok Sabha constituency). R.Srinivasan is the sitting Chairperson of the Municipality from ADMK.

== Education ==
The Adhiparasakthi College of Arts and Science was established in 1988. It is affiliated to the Thiruvalluvar University and recognised by the University Grants Commission.

== Transport ==
The main mode of transport is by bus since it is economical, and well connected by road. A State highway and two District State highways pass through by Kalavai. There are frequent buses to almost parts of Tamil Nadu. Buses depart every 15 to 20 minutes from Kalavai to Arcot town and there are also buses to Kancheepuram, Bangalore, Chennai, Cheyyar, Arni, Pondycherry, Vandhavasi, Vazhapanthal. There are lot of private bus operators as well, who provide services on local and short-distance routes. The nearest railway station to Kalavai is Walaja Road, which is around 30 km from Kalavai. There are buses (Route 30,34 And Short Cut) between Arani and Kancheepuram very frequently and also straight buses Available. The local bus from Arcot to Kalavai is route no.30,31,32,34,41,42. Buses depart every 20–30 minutes from Arcot Town to Kalavai.

The nearest railway station is Walajah Road station 30 km from the town lying between Arakkonam and Vellore-Katpadi Junction 40 km. The new broad gauge line from Tindivanam to Nagari via Walajah Road Junction will pass through nearby Timiri. It will function within one year.

The routemap from Arcot to Kalavai en route .

Arcot→Mupathuvetti→Pudhupadi→Periya Kukundi→Chinna Kukkundi→Paperi→Kadapanthangal→Kirambadi→Karikanthangal X Road→Kalavai cut road→Allalcheri→Kalavai

Arcot→Mupathuvetti→Labbapettai→Maangaadu→Sarvanthangal→Laadavaram→Pilleri→Athithangal→Karivedu→K VELUR→Karikanthangal→Kalavai cut road→Allalcheri→Kalavai

Arcot→Arcot Town Market→Thoppukana→Villapakam Cut Road→Sathur Cut Road→Villapakkam College→Timiri→Kavanur→Puthur→Agaram→Kalavai

The route map from Arcot to Cheyyar en route Arcot→Cheyyar highway at Kalavai X road. Kalavai → Chennasamudram → Manthaangal → Mel Nelli → Thattachri → Cheyyar Bus No 56B, ASM, Murugan 444 kalavai to Bangalore via (Vellore, Vaniyambadi, Ambur, Hosur).
