= Sholingur Assembly constituency =

State Legislative Assembly Constituency in Tamil Nadu

Coordinates: 13.11°N 79.42°E

Sholingur
- Constituency No. 39 for the Tamil Nadu Legislative Assembly

Constituency details
- Country: India
- Region: South India
- State: Tamil Nadu
- District: Ranipet
- Lok Sabha constituency: Arakkonam
- Established: 1951
- Total electors: 2,58,076

Member of Legislative Assembly
- 17th Tamil Nadu Legislative Assembly
- Incumbent G. Kapil
- Party: TVK
- Elected year: 2026

Sholingur is a state assembly constituency in Ranipet district in Tamil Nadu, India. Its State Assembly Constituency number is 39. It consists of portions of the Walajah and Arakkonam taluks. It falls under Arakkonam Lok Sabha constituency for national elections to the Parliament of India. It is one of the 234 State Legislative Assembly Constituencies in Tamil Nadu.

== Members of Legislative Assembly ==
=== Madras State ===
Year	Winner	Party
1952	M. Subramaniya Naicker	Commonweal Party
1957	B. Bakthavathaalu Naidu	Indian National Congress
1962	A. M. Ponnuranga Mudaliar	Indian National Congress
1967	Aranganathan	Dravida Munnetra Kazhagam

=== Tamil Nadu ===
Year	Winner	Party
1971	A. M. Ponnuranga Mudaliar	Indian National Congress
1977	S. J. Ramasamy Mudaliyar	All India Anna Dravida Munnetra Kazhagam
1980	C. Gopal Mudaliyar	All India Anna Dravida Munnetra Kazhagam
1984	N. Shanmugam	All India Anna Dravida Munnetra Kazhagam
1989	A. M. Munirathinam	Indian National Congress
1991	A. M. Munirathinam	Indian National Congress
1996	A. M. Munirathinam	Tamil Maanila Congress
2001	R. Vilvanathan	All India Anna Dravida Munnetra Kazhagam
2006	D. Arul Anbarasu	Indian National Congress
2011	P. R. Manogar	Desiya Murpokku Dravida Kazhagam
2016	N. G. Parthiban	All India Anna Dravida Munnetra Kazhagam
2019^	G. Sampathu	All India Anna Dravida Munnetra Kazhagam
2021	A. M. Munirathinam	Indian National Congress
2026	G. Kapil	Tamilaga Vettri Kazhagam

== Election results ==
Vote share of winning candidates
2026	36.16%
2021	49.46%
2019 by-election	48.00%
2016	36.79%
2011	38.98%
2006	45.98%
2001	50.12%
1996	54.33%
1991	53.90%
1989	39.24%
1984	51.38%
1980	49.40%
1977	38.23%
1971	55.39%
1967	51.67%
1962	56.02%
1957	55.44%
1952	36.16%

=== 2026 ===
2026 Tamil Nadu Legislative Assembly election: Sholingur
Party	Candidate	Votes	%	±%
TVK	G. Kapil	84,506	36.16	New
PMK	K. Saravanan	78,820	33.73	▼3.75
INC	A. M. Munirathinam	57,997	24.82	▼24.64
NTK	A. Ashok Kumar	6,468	2.77	▼1.56
NOTA	NOTA	572	0.24	▼0.32
Margin of victory		5,686	2.43	▼9.55
Turnout		2,33,684	90.55	▲10.22
Registered electors		2,58,076		▼19,364
TVK gain from INC		Swing	▲36.16	

=== 2021 ===
2021 Tamil Nadu Legislative Assembly election: Sholingur
Party	Candidate	Votes	%	±%
INC	A. M. Munirathinam	110,228	49.46%	17.28%
PMK	A. M. Krishnan	83,530	37.48%	
AMMK	N. G. Parthiban	12,979	5.82%	
NTK	Y. R. Pavendhan	9,656	4.33%	3.94%
MNM	R. Jawahar	1,664	0.75%	
NOTA	Nota	1,239	0.56%	−0.25%
Margin of victory		26,698	11.98%	7.37%
Turnout		2,22,870	80.33%	−1.70%
Rejected ballots		245	0.11%	
Registered electors		2,77,440		
INC gain from AIADMK		Swing	12.67%	

=== 2019 by-election ===
2019 Tamil Nadu Legislative Assembly by-elections: Sholingur
Party	Candidate	Votes	%	±%
AIADMK	G. Sampathu	103,545	48.00	
DMK	A. Asokan	87,489	40.56	
AMMK	T. G. Mani	12,868	5.97	+5.97
NTK	P. Gokulakrishnan	5,188	2.40	+2.40
MNM	A. Malayarajan	2,466	1.14	+1.14
NOTA	None of the Above	2,112	0.98	
Majority		16,056	7.44	
Turnout		2,15,795	82.34	
AIADMK hold		Swing		

=== 2016 ===
2016 Tamil Nadu Legislative Assembly election: Sholingur
Party	Candidate	Votes	%	±%
AIADMK	N. G. Parthiban	77,651	36.79%	
INC	A. M. Munirathinam	67,919	32.18%	11.59%
PMK	K. Saravanan	50,827	24.08%	
DMDK	P. R. Manogar	6,167	2.92%	−36.05%
NOTA	None Of The Above	1,691	0.80%	
BJP	Kumar. M	1,468	0.70%	
Margin of victory		9,732	4.61%	−0.42%
Turnout		2,11,064	82.03%	−2.69%
Registered electors		2,57,291		
AIADMK gain from DMDK		Swing	-2.19%	

=== 2011 ===
2011 Tamil Nadu Legislative Assembly election: Sholingur
Party	Candidate	Votes	%	±%
DMDK	P. R. Manogar	69,963	38.98%	29.64%
Independent	A. M. Munirathinam	60,925	33.94%	
INC	D. Arul Anbarasu	36,957	20.59%	−25.39%
Puratchi Bharatham	M. Bhavani.	3,858	2.15%	
Independent	T. V. Paramasivam	2,288	1.27%	
Independent	V. Velu	2,268	1.26%	
	A. M. Inbanathan	1,181	0.66%	
BSP	N. Dhinakaran	1,076	0.60%	
Independent	Vadivel	983	0.55%	
Margin of victory		9,038	5.04%	−0.70%
Turnout		2,11,864	84.72%	8.21%
Registered electors		1,79,499		
DMDK gain from INC		Swing	-7.00%	

=== 2006 ===
2006 Tamil Nadu Legislative Assembly election: Sholingur
Party	Candidate	Votes	%	±%
INC	D. Arul Anbarasu	63,502	45.98%	
AIADMK	Gopal. C	55,586	40.25%	−9.88%
DMDK	Prabakaran. C. D	12,900	9.34%	
Independent	Velu. V	2,026	1.47%	
SP	Gopi. R	1,319	0.96%	
BJP	Murugesan. D	1,308	0.95%	
Independent	Suresh. S	773	0.56%	
Margin of victory		7,916	5.73%	−2.11%
Turnout		1,38,112	76.52%	5.22%
Registered electors		1,80,495		
INC gain from AIADMK		Swing	-4.15%	

=== 2001 ===
2001 Tamil Nadu Legislative Assembly election: Sholingur
Party	Candidate	Votes	%	±%
AIADMK	R. Vilvanathan	62,576	50.12%	
PNK	A. M. Ponnuranga Mudaliar	52,781	42.28%	
MDMK	Ravi. N	3,033	2.43%	1.14%
Independent	Laksmipathi S. K.	2,539	2.03%	
Puratchi Bharatham	Arumugam. M	2,409	1.93%	
Independent	Babu. K. C.	1,504	1.20%	
Margin of victory		9,795	7.85%	−20.36%
Turnout		1,24,842	71.30%	−3.40%
Registered electors		1,75,100		
AIADMK gain from TMC(M)		Swing	-4.21%	

=== 1996 ===
1996 Tamil Nadu Legislative Assembly election: Sholingur
Party	Candidate	Votes	%	±%
TMC(M)	A. M. Munirathinam	65,361	54.33%	
PMK	Shanmugham. S.	31,431	26.13%	
INC	Jayababu. R.	20,849	17.33%	−36.57%
MDMK	Shanmugham. R.	1,557	1.29%	
Margin of victory		33,930	28.21%	−3.19%
Turnout		1,20,293	74.70%	4.13%
Registered electors		1,68,374		
TMC(M) gain from INC		Swing	0.43%	

=== 1991 ===
1991 Tamil Nadu Legislative Assembly election: Sholingur
Party	Candidate	Votes	%	±%
INC	A. M. Munirathinam	58,563	53.90%	14.66%
DMK	C. Manickam	24,453	22.51%	−10.56%
PMK	P. Panchatcharam	22,600	20.80%	
BJP	M. K. Santha Kumar	1,543	1.42%	
Independent	N. Chandiran	620	0.57%	
Margin of victory		34,110	31.40%	25.22%
Turnout		1,08,647	70.57%	9.43%
Registered electors		1,58,696		
INC hold		Swing	14.66%	

=== 1989 ===
1989 Tamil Nadu Legislative Assembly election: Sholingur
Party	Candidate	Votes	%	±%
INC	A. M. Munirathinam	33,419	39.24%	
DMK	C. Manickam	28,161	33.06%	−13.98%
AIADMK	C. Gopal	17,125	20.11%	−31.28%
AIADMK	Kanmani Porki Alias Selvaraj	3,692	4.33%	−47.05%
Independent	E. Nagarajan	728	0.85%	
Margin of victory		5,258	6.17%	1.84%
Turnout		85,171	61.14%	−17.49%
Registered electors		1,43,254		
INC gain from AIADMK		Swing	-12.15%	

=== 1984 ===
1984 Tamil Nadu Legislative Assembly election: Sholingur
Party	Candidate	Votes	%	±%
AIADMK	N. Shanmugam	47,967	51.38%	1.99%
DMK	K. Moorthi	43,918	47.05%	−2.13%
Independent	A. Kanthappan	952	1.02%	
Independent	A. M. Periyasamy	514	0.55%	
Margin of victory		4,049	4.34%	4.12%
Turnout		93,351	78.63%	16.16%
Registered electors		1,24,595		
AIADMK hold		Swing	1.99%	

=== 1980 ===
1980 Tamil Nadu Legislative Assembly election: Sholingur
Party	Candidate	Votes	%	±%
AIADMK	C. Gopal Mudaliyar	35,783	49.40%	11.16%
DMK	Moorthy. K	35,626	49.18%	19.25%
Independent	Annamalai Reddiar V. S	401	0.55%	
Independent	Kanthappan. A	330	0.46%	
Independent	Periasamy Reddiar. A. M	302	0.42%	
Margin of victory		157	0.22%	−8.09%
Turnout		72,442	62.46%	0.96%
Registered electors		1,17,710		
AIADMK hold		Swing	11.16%	

=== 1977 ===
1977 Tamil Nadu Legislative Assembly election: Sholingur
Party	Candidate	Votes	%	±%
AIADMK	S. J. Ramasamy Mudaliyar	25,997	38.23%	
DMK	K. Murthi	20,348	29.93%	−14.69%
INC	C. Rajendran	9,393	13.81%	−41.57%
JP	S.S. Sundararaman	9,266	13.63%	
Independent	S. Thiyagarajan	1,420	2.09%	
Independent	A. Kanthappan	919	1.35%	
Independent	G. Munisamy	652	0.96%	
Margin of victory		5,649	8.31%	−2.47%
Turnout		67,995	61.51%	−17.61%
Registered electors		1,12,141		
AIADMK gain from INC		Swing	-17.15%	

=== 1971 ===
1971 Tamil Nadu Legislative Assembly election: Sholingur
Party	Candidate	Votes	%	±%
INC	A. M. Ponnuranga Mudaliar	36,776	55.39%	14.02%
DMK	Natrajan K. M.	29,621	44.61%	−7.06%
Margin of victory		7,155	10.78%	0.47%
Turnout		66,397	79.11%	−3.87%
Registered electors		89,522		
INC gain from DMK		Swing	3.72%	

=== 1967 ===
1967 Madras Legislative Assembly election: Sholingur
Party	Candidate	Votes	%	±%
DMK	Aranganathan	35,225	51.67%	16.73%
INC	A. M. Ponnuranga Mudaliar	28,201	41.37%	−14.65%
Independent	A. Reddy	3,466	5.08%	
Independent	P. Reddy	1,282	1.88%	
Margin of victory		7,024	10.30%	−10.78%
Turnout		68,174	82.98%	3.60%
Registered electors		85,378		
DMK gain from INC		Swing	-4.35%	

=== 1962 ===
1962 Madras Legislative Assembly election: Sholingur
Party	Candidate	Votes	%	±%
INC	A. M. Ponnuranga Mudaliar	33,291	56.02%	0.57%
DMK	V. Munuswamy	20,762	34.94%	
Independent	Reriasamy Rreddy	4,308	7.25%	
Independent	Ganapathy Kannappa Mudali	1,069	1.80%	
Margin of victory		12,529	21.08%	−0.51%
Turnout		59,430	79.37%	23.48%
Registered electors		78,223		
INC hold		Swing	0.57%	

=== 1957 ===
1957 Madras Legislative Assembly election: Sholingur
Party	Candidate	Votes	%	±%
INC	B. Bakthavathaalu Naidu	22,991	55.44%	27.85%
Independent	M. Subramanian Naicker	14,037	33.85%	
Independent	Jayaraj	4,440	10.71%	
Margin of victory		8,954	21.59%	13.02%
Turnout		41,468	55.90%	2.33%
Registered electors		74,186		
INC gain from Commonweal Party		Swing	19.28%	

=== 1952 ===
1952 Madras Legislative Assembly election: Sholingur
Party	Candidate	Votes	%	±%
Commonweal Party	M. Subramanya Naicker	12,028	36.16%	
INC	V. M. Ramaswami Mudaliar	9,177	27.59%	27.59%
Independent	Perumal Alias Nannaya Naidu	2,754	8.28%	
Independent	S. Krishnaswami Naidu	2,473	7.43%	
Independent	B. Manavala Chowdary	2,453	7.37%	
Independent	Amavasaigan	1,195	3.59%	
Independent	P. R. Ratnavelu Naicker	1,136	3.42%	
KMPP	Tiruvangada Naicker	1,072	3.22%	
Margin of victory		2,851	8.57%	
Turnout		33,262	53.56%	
Registered electors		62,097		
Commonweal Party win (new seat)				
