= C. Abdul Hakeem College of Engineering & Technology =

Engineering college in Tamil Nadu, India

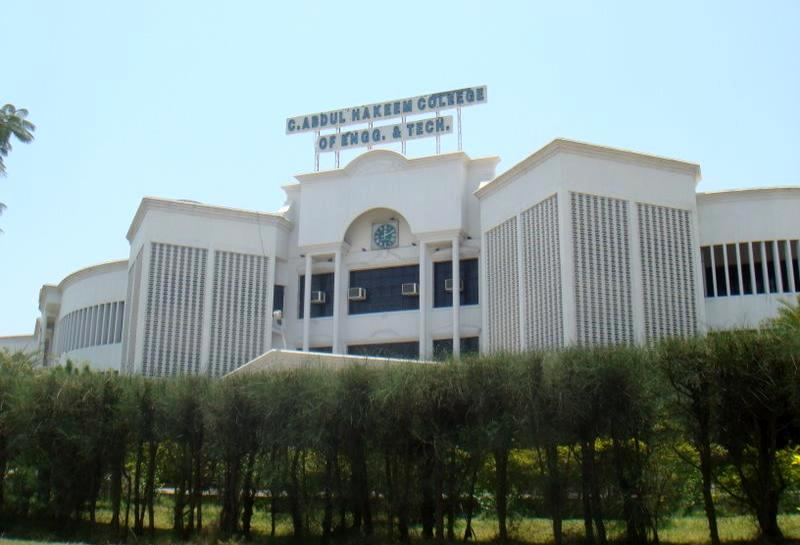
- Main building of CAHCET
- Motto: Enter To Learn. Leave To Serve.
- Type: Private (Minority Institution)
- Established: 1998
- Affiliations: Anna University
- Chairman: S. Ziauddin Ahmed
- Provost: V. M. Abdul Latheef
- Principal: A. Rajesh
- Location: Vellore, Tamil Nadu, India; 12.907334°N 79.295814°E
- Campus: Urban
- Website: www.cahcet.in/en/

C. Abdul Hakeem College of Engineering & Technology (CAHCET) is a non-profit self-financed engineering college located in Vellore, Tamil Nadu, India. It is affiliated to Anna University. It offers 14 undergraduate and postgraduates programs in engineering and management. This college is one of the several educational institutions run by the Melvisharam Muslim Educational Society which was founded in the year 1918.

== History ==
CAHCET was established in the year 1998 by the Melvisharam Muslim Educational Society (MMES). Though MMES was established in the year 1918 by Nawab C. Abdul Hakeem, the focus was to provide school education, and arts and science degrees through its first college named after Nawab. Currently, the MMES governs many institutions from primary to tertiary levels for people of all religious backgrounds in India.

- C. Abdul Hakeem College of Engineering and Technology
- C. Abdul Hakeem College of Arts and Science
- M.M.E.S Academy of Architecture
- M.M.E.S Women s Arts & Science College
- Islamiah Boys Higher Secondary School
- Islamiah Girls Higher Secondary School
- Islamiah Primary School for Boys
- Islamiah Primary School for Girls
- Hakeem Matriculation School
- F.M. Primary School
- R.A. Primary School

== Campus ==
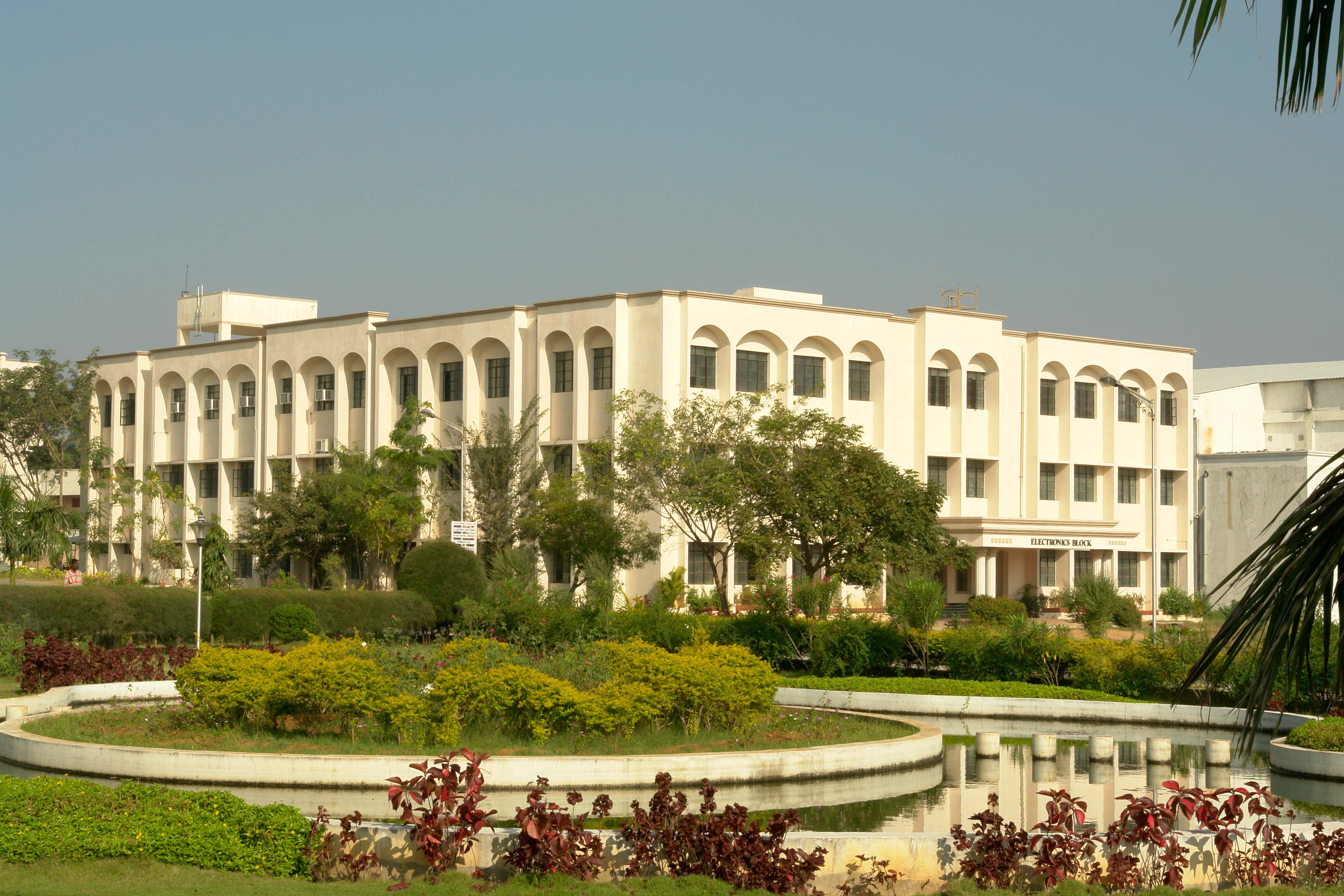
Electronics Department Building OF CAHCET

CAHCET campus is located in Melvisharam, a town and suburb of Vellore city which is approximately 100 km from Anna International Airport, Chennai. The campus houses several buildings including administration building, Mechanical Department, Electronics Department, Human Science Department, MBA Department, library, auditorium, seminar halls, sports grounds, cafeteria and boys hostel and girls hostel. Some of the facilities such as sports ground, Mosque, etc., are shared with its sister institution C. Abdul Hakeem College of Arts and Science.

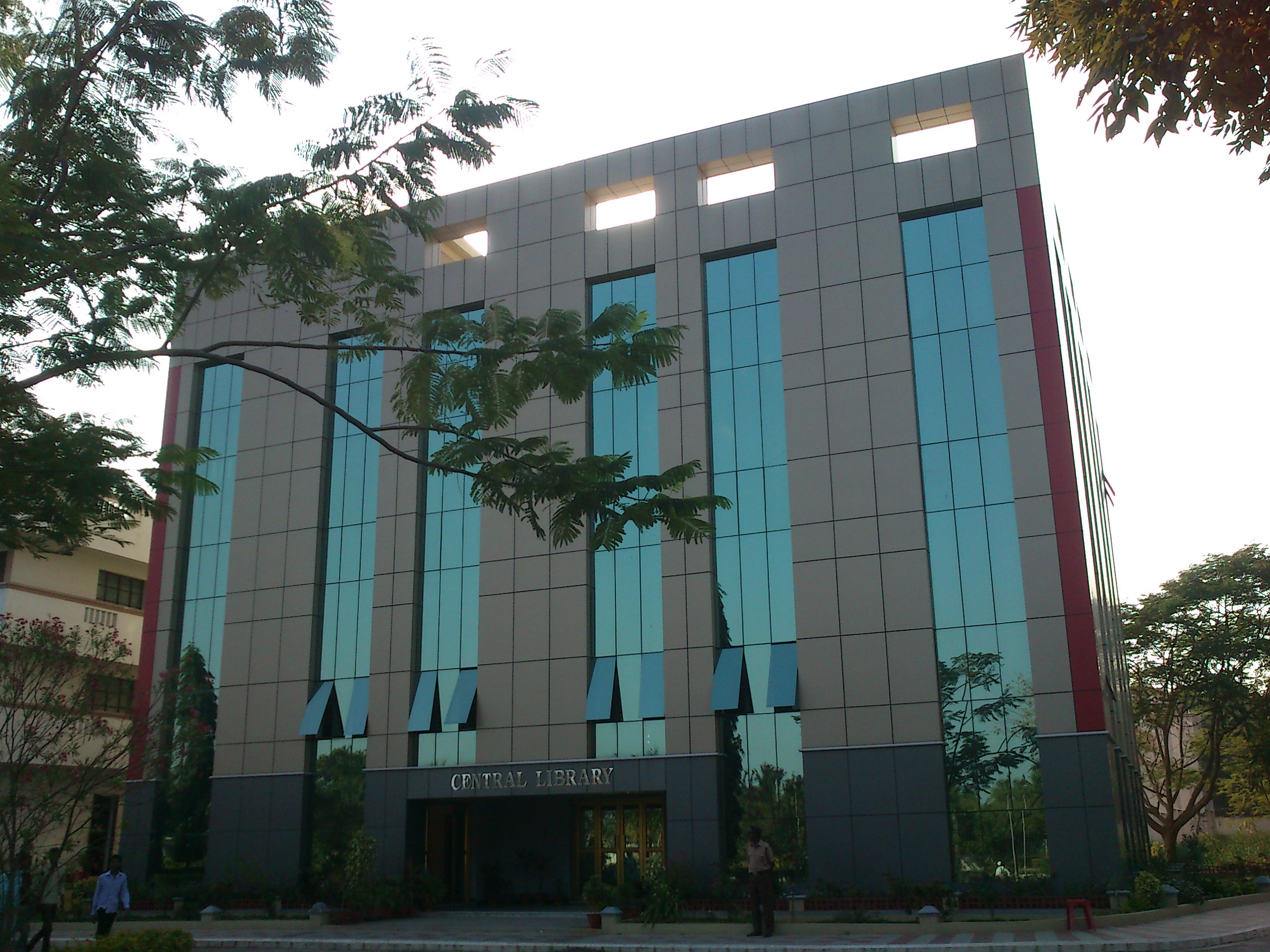
CAHCET Central Library

The central library is one of the energy efficient buildings constructed in the campus. The campus is Wi-Fi enabled and has 10 Mbit/s leased-line connectivity. CAHCET is also a lifetime member in Anna University´s EDUSAT Programme.

== Academics ==
The College is approved by the All India Council for Technical Education (AICTE), New Delhi and affiliated to the Anna University, Chennai. Therefore, the programs offered at CAHCET are subjected to the affiliated university regulations.

== International Relations ==
The institution has signed MOUs with several universities and industries. CAHCET signed its first international MoU with the International Islamic University Malaysia in 2013.

== Student life ==
=== Sport ===
Sport is an important activity of the students in the college. While cricket is the popular sport, students have won championships in basketball, football, badminton, hockey, yoga, and handball.

=== Seminars ===
The institution hosts seminars on various subjects by inviting experts in those respective fields. The CAHCET campus has three well equipped seminar rooms and a large auditorium which can house approximately 2500 people.

=== Graduation ===
As of the year 2022, the college has held 20 convocations. Several VIPs including vice-chancellors, government ministers and governors are invited as chief guests and honorary guests. On the graduation day, graduates receiving an undergraduate degree wear the academic dress that they were entitled to before graduating and graduates receiving a postgraduate degree (e.g. PhD or Master's) wear the academic dress that they were entitled to before graduating, Students achieving high ranks in the state level exams are awarded in such ceremonies.
