= Ponnam Mangalam =

Ponnammangalam
- Village
- Location within Tamil Nadu
- Coordinates: 12.921349°N 79.135208°E
- Country: India
- State: Tamil Nadu
- District: Ranipet
- Admin. div.: Arcot taluk

Ponnammangalam is a village in Arcot taluk in Ranipet district of the Indian state of Tamil Nadu.
