= Perapperi =

Village in Tamil Nadu, India

- Village
- Interactive map of Perapperi
- Coordinates: 12.975403°N 79.563457°E
- Country: India
- State: Tamil Nadu
- district: Vellore
- block: Nemili

Population
  - Total: 1,396

Perapperi village is located in Nemili block of Vellore district in Tamil Nadu, India.

== Population ==
Perapperi has population of 1,396 in the 2011 Census, with 656 males and 740 females.

postal code is 632502.

== Education ==
In the 2011 Census, Perapperi had a literacy rate of 72.8%, which is higher than the 70.5% rate in Vellore district. Specifically, the male literacy rate in Perapperi was 84.67%, while the female literacy rate was 61.97%.
