= Ozhalai =

Village in Arcot taluk, Ranipet district, Tamil Nadu, India

Coordinates: 12°38′20″N 79°57′19″E

Ozhalai is a village in Arcot taluk, Ranipet district, Tamil Nadu, India. As of the 2011 Census of India, it had a population of 447 across 111 households.
