= A. M. Ponnuranga Mudaliar =

Indian politician

A. M. Ponnuranga Mudaliar was an Indian politician and former Member of the Legislative Assembly of Tamil Nadu. He was elected to the Tamil Nadu legislative assembly from Sholinghur constituency as an Indian National Congress (INC) candidate in 1962 election and as an Indian National Congress (Organisation) candidate in 1971 election.

Ponnuranga and his three brothers, including A. M. Munirathinam, formed a once staunch INC-supporting family that has dominated the political life of the mostly rural area of Sholinghur since the 1960s, with one or other of the brothers either winning or being runner-up in eight of the twelve state assembly elections between 1962 and 2011. They operate a private bus company that provides both local employment and much-need cheap transport.

Munirathinam was the sitting MLA in Sholinghur at the time of the 2001 state assembly elections. However, his INC party had reached an electoral agreement with the All India Anna Dravida Munnetra Kazhagam (AIADMK) that meant an AIADMK candidate would be fielded and he was not allowed to contest the seat. Ponnuranga then decided to stand as a candidate of the small Puthiya Needhi Katchi party, which was allied with the Dravida Munnetra Kazhagam. He came a close second.
