= Perumuchi =

- city
- Location in Tamil Nadu, India
- Coordinates: 13°03′51″N 79°40′28″E
- Country: India
- State: Tamil Nadu
- District: Ranipet

Population (2001)
  - Total: 8,140

Languages
  - Official: Tamil
- Time zone: UTC+5:30 (IST)

Perumuchi is a census town in Ranipet district in the Indian state of Tamil Nadu.

== Demographics ==
As of 2001 India census, Perumuchi had a population of 8140. Males constitute 53% of the population and females 47%. Perumuchi has an average literacy rate of 78%, higher than the national average of 59.5%: male literacy is 83%, and female literacy is 72%. In Perumuchi, 15% of the population is under 6 years of age.
