= Kadarkarai Murugan =

Indian zoologist and researcher (born 1961)

Dr. Kadarkarai Murugan
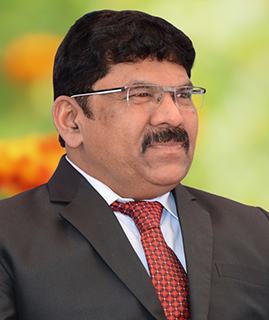
- Dr. Kadarkarai Murugan
- Born: Appipatty, Theni district, Tamil Nadu
- Citizenship: Indian
- Occupations: Academician, Researcher, CSIR Emeritus Scientist
- Employer(s): Bharathiar University, Coimbatore, Tamil Nadu
- Title: Former Vice Chancellor Thiruvalluvar University, Vellore, TN, India,

Kadarkarai Murugan (born 1961) is an Indian zoologist, scientist, and researcher who served as the vice chancellor of the Thiruvalluvar University, Vellore, Tamil Nadu, India, for three years from 2016 to 2019. Currently, he serves as the CSIR Emeritus Scientist, Department of Zoology, Bharathiar University, Coimbatore (since 2022).

== Life and career ==
Murugan was born to parents Enasuran Kadarkarai and Kalichiammal in Appipatty, Theni district, Tamil Nadu, into an agricultural family. He completed his early education in Appipatty, Theni district, earned a BSc from Pachaiyappa's College, and obtained an MSc in zoology from Madras Christian College. He later received an MPhil in endocrinology from the University of Madras and a PhD in insect physiology from the Entomology Research Institute at Loyola College. Bharathiar University awarded him a DSc for his published research. He joined the faculty of Bharathiar University in 1990. Subsequently, he held positions including registrar (in charge), Additional Director at the Defence Research and Development Organisation (DRDO) Centre for Life Sciences, and Pro Vice Chancellor of the University of Science and Technology Meghalaya. From 2016 to 2019, he served as Vice Chancellor of Thiruvalluvar University, where initiatives such as the creation of a herbal garden were undertaken. At Bharathiar University, he was associated with the “Bharathi Vannam” ecological restoration programme involving campus reforestation activities.

His research spans chemical ecology, insect physiology, insect–plant interactions, vector biology, nanobiotechnology, biodiversity studies, and pest management. Much of his work has examined natural bioactive compounds such as azadirachtin, a limonoid from the Indian neem tree (Azadirachta indica), and chitosan, a biopolymer derived from crustacean shells, with applications reported in agriculture, aquaculture, and vector control. Murugan has supervised numerous postgraduate and doctoral researchers and has authored several hundred scientific publications. He is listed among the Top 2% Scientists globally as per the Stanford University global ranking and ranked 15th in India in Biology and Biochemistry by Research.com He has received fellowships and awards from organisations including the Commonwealth Scholarship Commission, Japan's Science and Technology Agency, the Chinese Academy of Sciences–TWAS programme, CSIRO (Australia), JSPS Invitation (Japan), 100 Talent (China) and others. He has collaborated with researchers in India and abroad, including T. N. Ananthakrishnan, Ignacimuthu S.J., W. Selvamurthy, Steve Simpson, David Raubenheimer, Feng Ge, Jiang Shiou Hwang, Megha Parajulee, Akon Higuchi, and Fajun Chen. His work with DRDO on bioinsecticides has been acknowledged in communications by public officials, including Former President of India, His Excellency A. P. J. Abdul Kalam and Former Defence Minister, Hon. A. K. Antony.

He is married to Jayarani and has two children Keerthivani (daughter) and Vasanthakumaran (son).

== Books and book chapters ==
- Murugan, K., Senthilkumar, B., & Palani, S. (2016). Indian herbs for Alzheimer's disease and associated symptoms. LAP Lambert Academic Publishing. ISBN 9783659912672
- Murugan, K., Rajaganesh, R., Vasanthakumaran, M., Shyu, D. J., Hwang, J. S., Dahms, H. U., ... & Panneerselvam, C. (2024). Mosquito Vector Management in Clean, Stagnant, and Sewage Water Ecosystems. In Environmental Nexus Approach (pp. 102-114). CRC Press.
