= Kattuppakkam =

- Location within Tamil Nadu
- Coordinates: 13°5′2″N 80°16′12″E
- Country: India
- State: Tamil Nadu
- Region: Tondai Nadu
- District: Vellore

Population (2011)
  - Total: 3,500

Languages
  - Official: Tamil
- Time zone: UTC+5:30 (IST)
- PIN: 632502
- Telephone code: 91- 416
- Vehicle registration: TN 23, TN 73

Kattuppakkam is a village in the taluk of Nemili, in Vellore district in the Indian state of Tamil Nadu.
