= Seekarajapuram =

Seekarajapuram is a village panchayat located in the Walajah taluk of Ranipet district in Tamil Nadu, India. It is located around 121 km (75 mi) away from Chennai.
