= I. Thahira =

Indian politician (born 1986)

Member of the Tamil Nadu Legislative Assembly
- Incumbent
- Assumed office 4 May 2026
- Preceded by: R. Gandhi (DMK)
- Constituency: Ranipet

Personal details
- Party: Tamilaga Vettri Kazhagam

I. Thahira (born 1986) is an Indian politician from Tamil Nadu. She is a Member of the Legislative Assembly from Ranipet representing Tamilaga Vettri Kazhagam (TVK).

She is from Ranipet, Tamil Nadu. She is the wife of Ibrahim. She studied at Ebenezer Aided Middle School, Katpadi and passed Class 10. She declared assets worth Rs.33 lakh.

== Political career ==
=== 2026 Tamil Nadu Legislative Assembly election ===
In the 2026 Tamil Nadu Legislative Assembly election, Thahira contested from the Ranipet assembly constituency in Ranipet district. Ranipet is an industrial urban constituency, the 41st assembly seat in Tamil Nadu, falling under the Arakkonam Lok Sabha constituency. The constituency had been held by the DMK in 2021, when R. Gandhi won by a margin of 16,498 votes over the AIADMK's Sukumar.

Thahira won the seat, polling 91,149 votes and defeating DMK incumbent R. Gandhi by a margin of 5,787 votes, and also defeating TMC(M) candidate V. M. Karthikeyan.

2026 Tamil Nadu Legislative Assembly election result: Ranipet
| Party | Candidate | Votes | % | ±% |
|---|---|---|---|---|
| TVK | I. Thahira | 91,149 | | |
| DMK | R. Gandhi | 85,362 | | |
| TMC(M) | V. M. Karthikeyan | | | |
| Majority | | 5,787 | | |

== Electoral history ==
| Year | Election | Constituency | Party | Result | Votes | Margin |
|---|---|---|---|---|---|---|
| 2026 | Tamil Nadu Assembly Election | Ranipet | Tamilaga Vettri Kazhagam | Won | 91,149 | 5,787 |

== See also ==
- 2026 Tamil Nadu Legislative Assembly election
- Tamilaga Vettri Kazhagam
- Ranipet (state assembly constituency)
- Vijay (actor)
