= Vettangulam =

Village in Tamil Nadu, India

Coordinates: 12°58′N 79°36′E

Vettangulam is a village located in Nemili, Vellore district, Ranipet, Tamil Nadu, India.

== Demographics ==
In 2011, it had a population of 1465 with 362 individual households. The literacy rate was 77.23% for the total population, with a male literacy rate of 85.13% and a female literacy rate of only 69.84%. 13.6% of the population belonged to scheduled tribes and 53.4% belonged to scheduled castes.
