= Timiri =

- Town
- Location in Tamil Nadu, India
- Coordinates: 12.78°N 79.29°E
- Country: India
- State: Tamil Nadu
- District: Ranipet

Area
  - Total: 6.47 km^{2} (2.50 sq mi)

Population (2011)
  - Total: 16,246
  - Density: 2,510/km^{2} (6,500/sq mi)

Languages
  - Official: Tamil
- Time zone: UTC+5:30 (IST)
- Postal code: 632512
- Vehicle registration: TN73
- Website: https://www.townpanchayat.in/thimiri

Thimiri is a panchayat town in Ranipet district in the Indian state of Tamil Nadu. The Town Panchayat was originally a religious centre with the presence of large number of temples, Mosque. The town has gained importance especially by the cultivation of paddy, Ragi. Ground nut and Sugar Cane.The Somanatha Pashana Lingeswarar Temple a Hindu temple dedicated to Lord Shiva and Kumaragiri Murugan Temple is a Hindu Temple dedicated to Lord Murugan located in Kumaragiri Hills are famous temple in Timiri. The present area of the Town Panchayat is 6.47 km^{2}. The town is divided into 15 election wards. Thimiri is a Town Panchayat coming under the administrative territory of Ranipet district and Arcot Taulk. This Town is located on 22 km away from Arani, 31 km at away from Vellore city and 125 km away from State capital Chennai. Thimiri is on State Highway 4 or SH4 between Arcot and Arani. This is on the main route from Arani to Chennai Highway. The State Roads connect Thimiri Town Panchayat with surrounding towns and other urban centers in the district.

== Demographics ==
As of 2001 India census, Timiri had a population of 14,939. Males constitute 50% of the population and females 50%. Timiri has an average literacy rate of 68%, higher than the national average of 59.5%: male literacy is 77%, and female literacy is 59%. In Timiri, 11% of the population is under 6 years of age.
