= C. Gopal =

Indian politician

C. Gopal Mudaliyar

President of the Amma Makkal Munnetra Kazhagam
- Incumbent
- Assumed office 6 August 2023
- Preceded by: position established

Personal details
- Political party: Amma Makkal Munnetra Kazhagam

C. Gopal Mudaliyar is a politician from Tamil Nadu who currently serves as the President of Amma Makkal Munnetra Kazhagam. He was elected from the Sholinghur constituency to the Seventh Tamil Nadu Legislative Assembly as a member of the All India Anna Dravida Munnetra Kazhagam political party in 1980 and he was elected as MP from the Arakkonam (Lok Sabha constituency) to the 12th Lok Sabha in 1998.

He was born in Sengunthar Kaikola Mudaliyar community. His son N. G. Parthiban was elected as MLA from the Sholinghur constituency in 2016. He was elected as the President of Ammk in 2023 in party's general council meeting.
