= Somanatha Pashana Lingeswarar Temple, Timiri =

Somanatha Pashana Lingeswarar Temple
- Location in Tamil Nadu

Religion
- Affiliation: Hinduism
- District: Vellore
- Deity: Somanatha Pashana Lingeswarar (Shiva)

Location
- Location: Timiri
- State: Tamil Nadu
- Country: India
- Interactive map of Somanatha Pashana Lingeswarar Temple
- Coordinates: 12.78°N 79.29°E

Architecture
- Completed: 1985

The Somanatha Pashana Lingeswarar Temple in Timiri, Tamil Nadu, India is a Hindu temple dedicated to Shiva.
