= Walajapet block =

Revenue block, in Tamil Nadu state, India

The Walajapet block is a revenue block in the Ranipet district of Tamil Nadu, India. It has a total of 36 panchayat villages.
