= Sholinghur block =

The Sholinghur block is a revenue block in the Ranipet district of Tamil Nadu, India. It has a total of 45 panchayat villages.

== Revenue Villages ==
1) Ammavaripalle
2) Avularangaiahpalli
3) Balakuppam
4) Elauanellore
5) Erukkambattu
6) Gollapalli
7) Govindhacheri
8) GovindacheriKuppam
9) Jambukulam
10) Kadappanthangal
11) Kallalankuppam
12) Karadikupam
13) Kattarambakkam
14) Keeraisathu
15) Kesavanakuppam
16) Kodaikal
17) Kolatheri
18) Kondamananaidupalayam
19) Madandakuppam
20) Mahimandalam
21) Marudalam
22) Melpadi
23) Mel Veeranam
24) Mutharasikuppam
25) Ozhugar
26) Pandiyanellore
27) Paramasathu
28) Rendadi
29) Perumalkuppam
30) Ponnai
31) Ponnappanthangal
32) Pulivalam
33) Sekkadikuppam
34) Sengalnatham
35) Somasundaram
36) Thagarakuppam
37) Thalangai
38) Thengal
39) Thenpalli
40) Venghur
41) Vannampalli
42) Vallimalai
43) Velam
44) Melvenkatapuram
45) Veppalai
