= Arakkonam block =

The Arakkonam block is a revenue block in the Ranipet district of Tamil Nadu, India. It has a total of 26 panchayat villages.
