= Vilapakkam =

Coordinates: 12°51′43″N 79°17′32″E

Vilapakkam Kapithapuram in Sanskrit
- Town
- Nickname: VPK
- Interactive map of Vilapakkam
- Country: India
- State: Tamil Nadu
- District: Ranipet district

Population (2001)
  - Total: 8,053

Languages
  - Official: Tamil
- Time zone: UTC+5:30 (IST)
- Postal code: 632521

Vilapakkam is a panchayat town in Ranipet district in the Indian state of Tamil Nadu.

== Demographics ==
As of 2001 India census, Vilapakkam had a population of 8053. Males constitute 50% of the population and females 50%. Vilapakkam has an average literacy rate of 68%, higher than the national average of 59.5%: male literacy is 77%, and female literacy is 58%. In Vilapakkam, 11% of the population is under 6 years of age. Vilapakkam is situated to the south of Arcot in Ranipet District. This town is around 25 km south-east of Vellore. Kavanur is in the west and Thimiri, on the Arcot-Arani Road, in the south. The hilly area locally known as Pancha Pandava Malai in Vilapakkam was a flourishing Jain center during the early medieval period as it is evident from the rock cut cave temple, natural caverns with Jaina figures and inscriptions. The rock cut cave temple is a large excavation on the eastern lace of the huge hill.

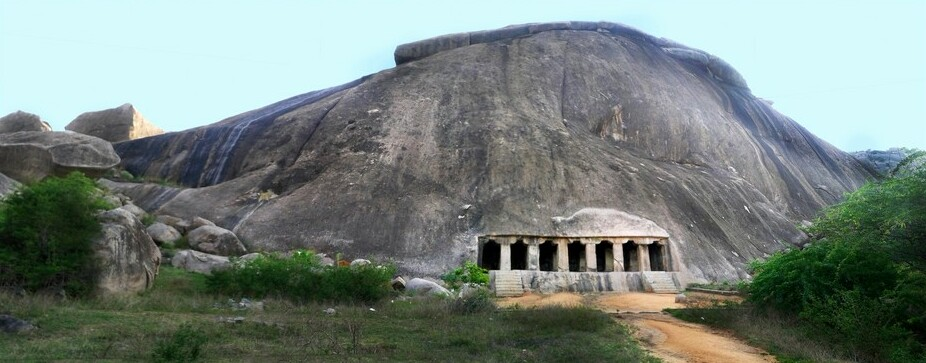
The Villapakkam Jain Rock Cut Cave
