= Kaveripakkam block =

Revenue block in Tamil Nadu, India

The Kaveripakkam block is a revenue block in the Ranipet district of Tamil Nadu, India. It has a total of 55 panchayat villages.
