= Ammoor =

Ammoor ammoor Vellore Metro Suburb
- Town panchayat
- Location in Tamil Nadu, India
- Coordinates: 13°0′3″N 79°22′21″E
- Country: India
- State: Tamil Nadu
- District: Ranipet
- City: Vellore

Population (2001)
  - Total: 11,296

Languages
  - Official: Tamil
- Time zone: UTC+5:30 (IST)
- Postal code: 632501

Ammoor is a town panchayat in Ranipet district and it is part of Vellore metropolitan area in the state of Tamil Nadu, India.

Ammoor railway station named as 'Walaja Road Railway Station', was opened by the British Government around 1856 C.E.

And the place Kalathu Medu is famous during any occasions of the town.

== Demographics ==
As of 2001 India census, Ammoor had a population of 11,296. Males constitute 50% of the population and females 50%. Ammoor has an average literacy rate of 66%, higher than the national average of 59.5%; with 59% of the males and 41% of females literate. 12% of the population is under 6 years of age.

The town has government schools.
