= Timiri block =

The Timiri block is a revenue block in the Ranipet district of Tamil Nadu, India. It has a total of 55 panchayat villages. Thimiri/Timiri is on State Highway 4 or SH4 between Arcot and Arani. This is on the main route from Arani to Chennai Highway.
