= Sholinghur =

Sholinghur Thirukkadigai
- Municipality
- Sholingar
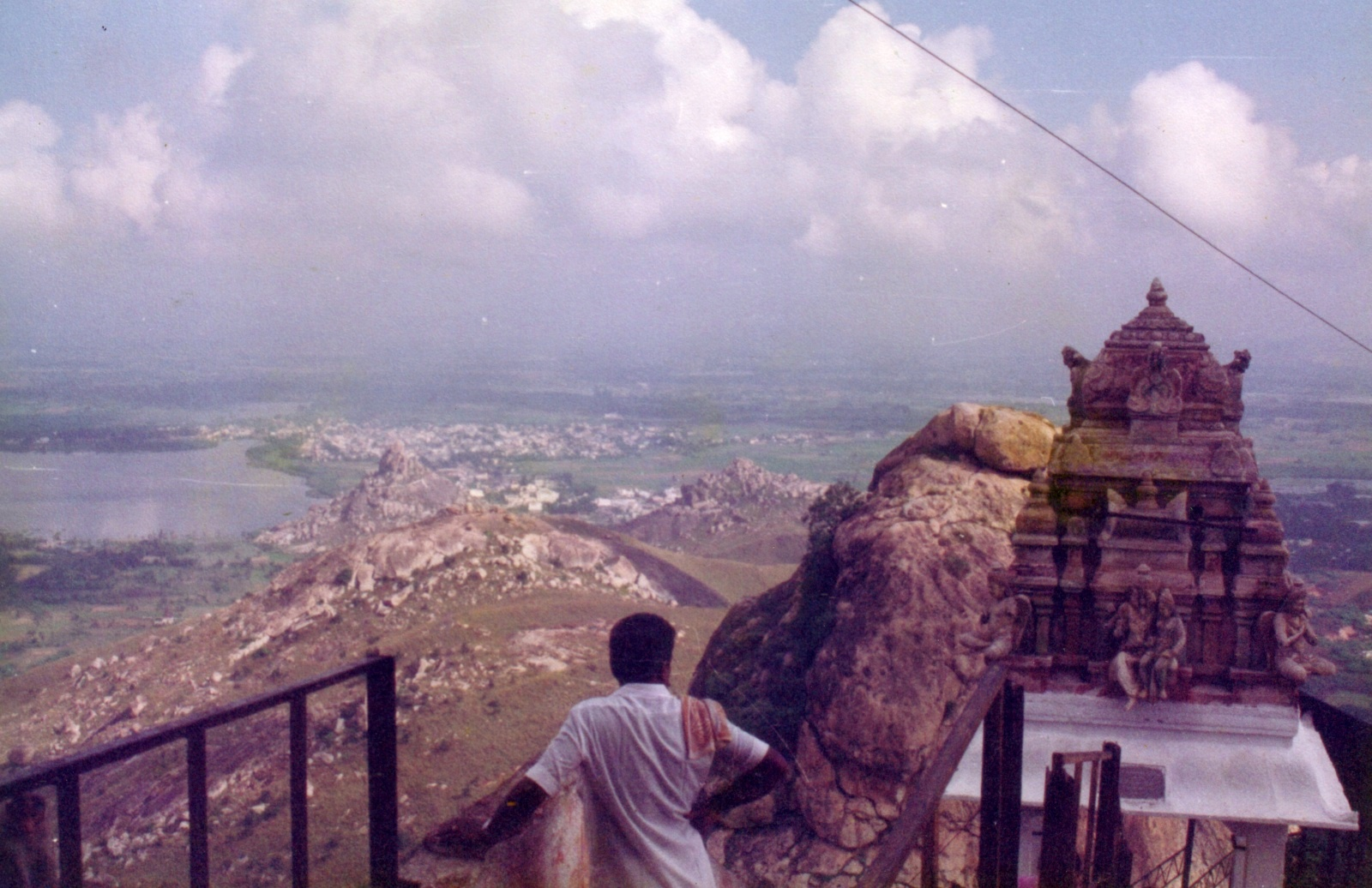
- Distant view of the temple town from the Yoga Narasimha Swamy temple

- Location in Tamil Nadu, India
- Coordinates: 13.1116°N 79.4310°E
- Country: India
- State: Tamil Nadu
- District: Ranipet
- Lok Sabha constituency: Arakkonam
- State Assembly constituency: Sholinghur
- Region: Vellore

Area
  - Total: 9.5 km^{2} (3.7 sq mi)
- Elevation: 155 m (509 ft)

Population (2011)
  - Total: 30,856
  - Density: 3,200/km^{2} (8,400/sq mi)

Languages
  - Official: Tamil
- Time zone: UTC+05:30 (IST)
- PIN: 631102
- Telephone code: 04172
- Vehicle registration: TN-73

Sholinghapuram, shortened to Sholinghur (Tamil: சோளிங்கப்புரம் or சோளிங்கர்) is a municipality in the Sholinghur taluk in Ranipet district, Tamil Nadu, India. It is known in Tamil Nadu and neighboring states for its Lakshmi Narasimha Swamy temple.

Sholinghur connects major towns and Cities such as Chennai, Vellore, Ranipet, Arakkonam, Arcot, Walajapet, Tiruttani(Tamil Nadu), and Chittoor and Tirupati (Andhra Pradesh) Bengaluru (Karnataka). With 27 wards, the Dravida Munnetra Kazhagam party carried 19 wards in the 2022 local elections.

== Etymology ==
Sholinghur's original name was Thirukkadigai. This signifies its status as one of the 108 Divya Desams in Vaishnavism. Under the Cholas and the nawabs, Thirukkadigai was less used in favour of Chozha Singapuram. A Sanskrit college is in the municipality.

The name Sholinghur, a contraction of the words Chola-linga-puram, was bestowed because a Chola king had found a natural lingam (suyambu) and built the Sholeswara temple over it. The temple is in the centre of Sholinghur. According to legend, Lord Narasimha sends messengers to preach reform; one was Doddacharya of Chozha Lingapuram (சோழலிங்கபுறம்), who lived nearly 470 years ago. Ill and sitting at the Varadharaja Perumal Temple tank during his annual Srivari Brahmotsavam visit to Kanchipuram, he prayed to Narasimha (Varadharaja Perumal, or Vishnu). Varadharaja Perumal appeared to him for a few seconds, and the Varadharaja Perumal idol disappeared in Kanchipuram. A temple dedicated to Vishnu was built, which is open only during Srivari Brahmotsavam in Kanchipuram. The Varadharaja Perumal idol is covered with a screen for a few seconds and then opened to commemorate the disappearance and reappearance of the idol.

The name Choza Lingapuram was shortened to Sholinghapuram. During the late 20th century, it was further shortened to its present name.

== History ==
In the 27 September 1781 Battle of Sholinghur, during the Second Anglo-Mysore War, Eyre Coote fought against Tipu Sultan and Hyder Ali. A burial ground near the bus terminal is dedicated to the soldiers of Tipu Sultan's army. TVS Group established its first factory in the early 1980s, and has become one of the region's largest private employers.

== Demographics ==
Religious census
Religion	Percent(%)
Hindu	94.52%
Muslim	3.43%
Christian	1.59%
Sikh	0.06%
Jain	0.36%
No religion	0.04%

According to the 2011 census, there were 7,359 families in Sholinghur. Its total population of Sholingur was 34,854: 17,415 males and 17,439 females, for a sex ratio of 1.002. The population of children ages six and younger was 3,297, 11 percent of the total: 1,717 males and 1,580 females, for a sex ratio of 920 girls to every 1,000 boys. The town's literacy rate was 85.6 percent, higher than that of Vellore district (79.2 percent). Its male literacy rate was 92.14 percent, and its female literacy rate was 79.16 percent.

== Industry ==
Sholinghur's primary industries are agriculture and lungi-textile weaving. The town has an IT company, and several TVS factories are nearby.

== Transport ==
Sholinghur is on the West Line of the Chennai Suburban Railway. Its railway station, Banavaram–Sholingapuram, is about 13 kilometres (8.1 mi) away. Government and private bus operators have service to Vellore, Ranipet, Arakkonam and Tiruttani, and there is Direct bus service to Chennai, Bangalore, Vellore, Ranipet, Walajapet, Arcot, Ponnai, Kancheepuram, Chengalpattu, Tambaram, Tirupati, and Chittoor.

== Government ==
The legislature has 27 members, one from each ward. It is headed by an elected chairperson, assisted by a deputy chairperson. Sholinghur is part of the Arakkonam Lok Sabha constituency. Its MLA is G. Kapil of the TVK, and its MP is S. Jagathrakshakan of the DMK.

== Gallery ==
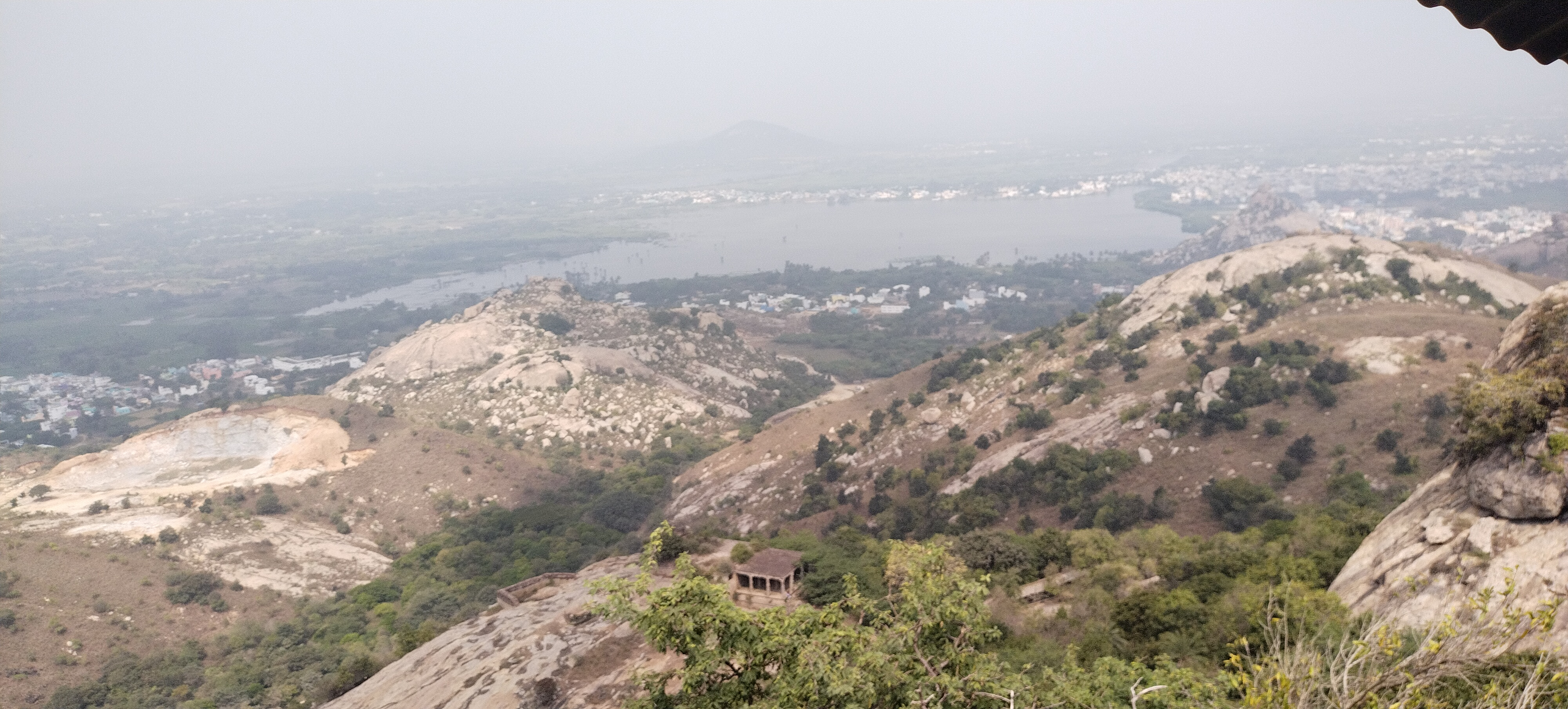
View of Sholingur from Yoga Narasimha Swamy Temple

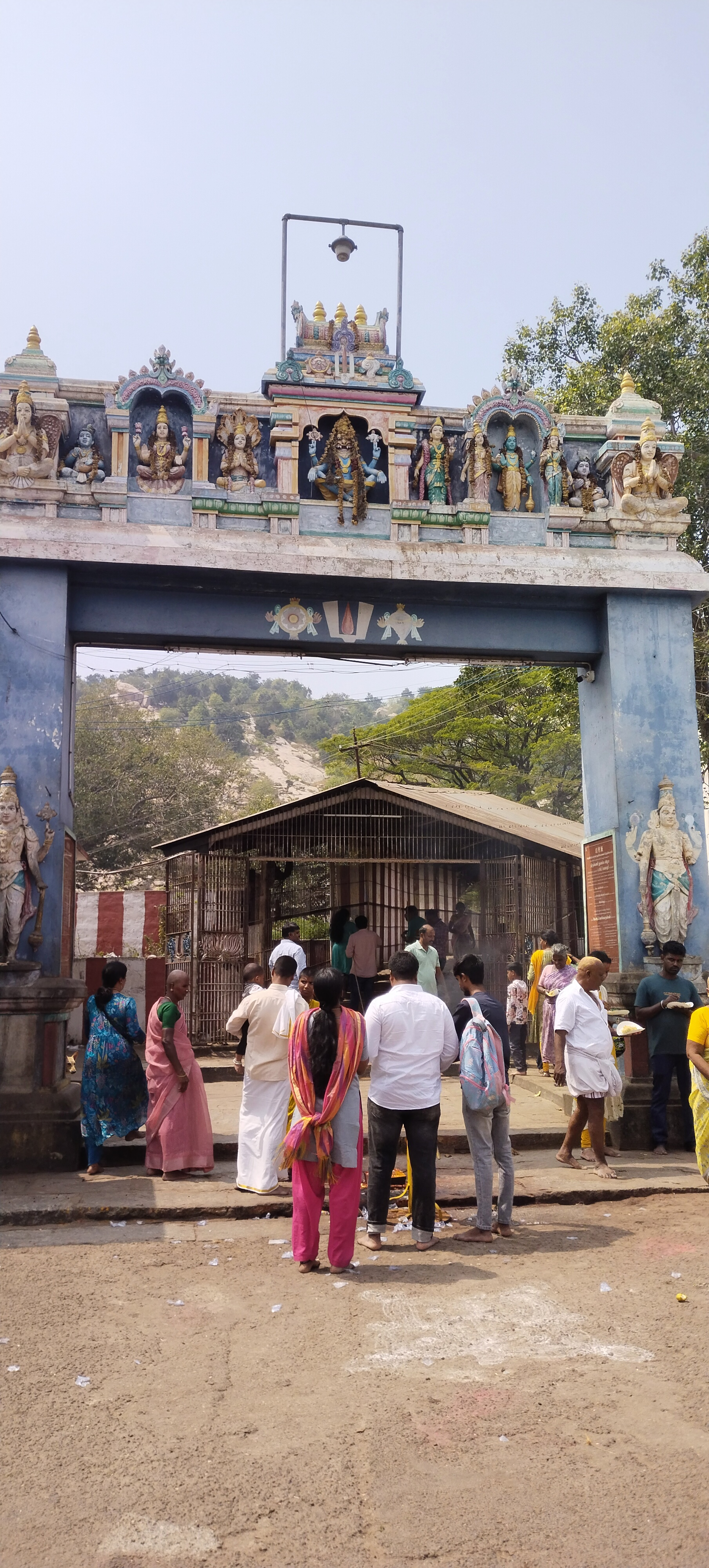
Temple entrance

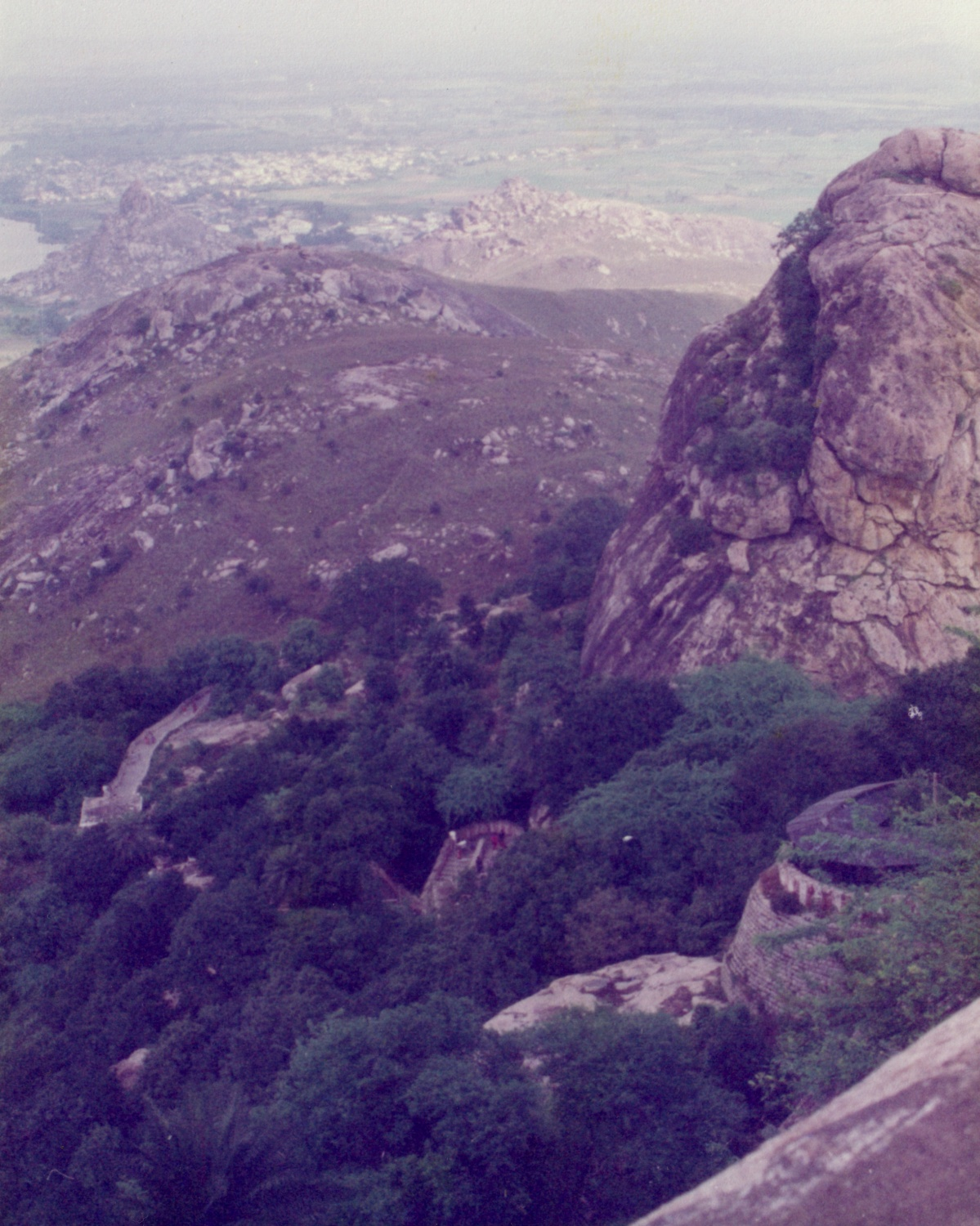
Steps leading to the temple, seen from above

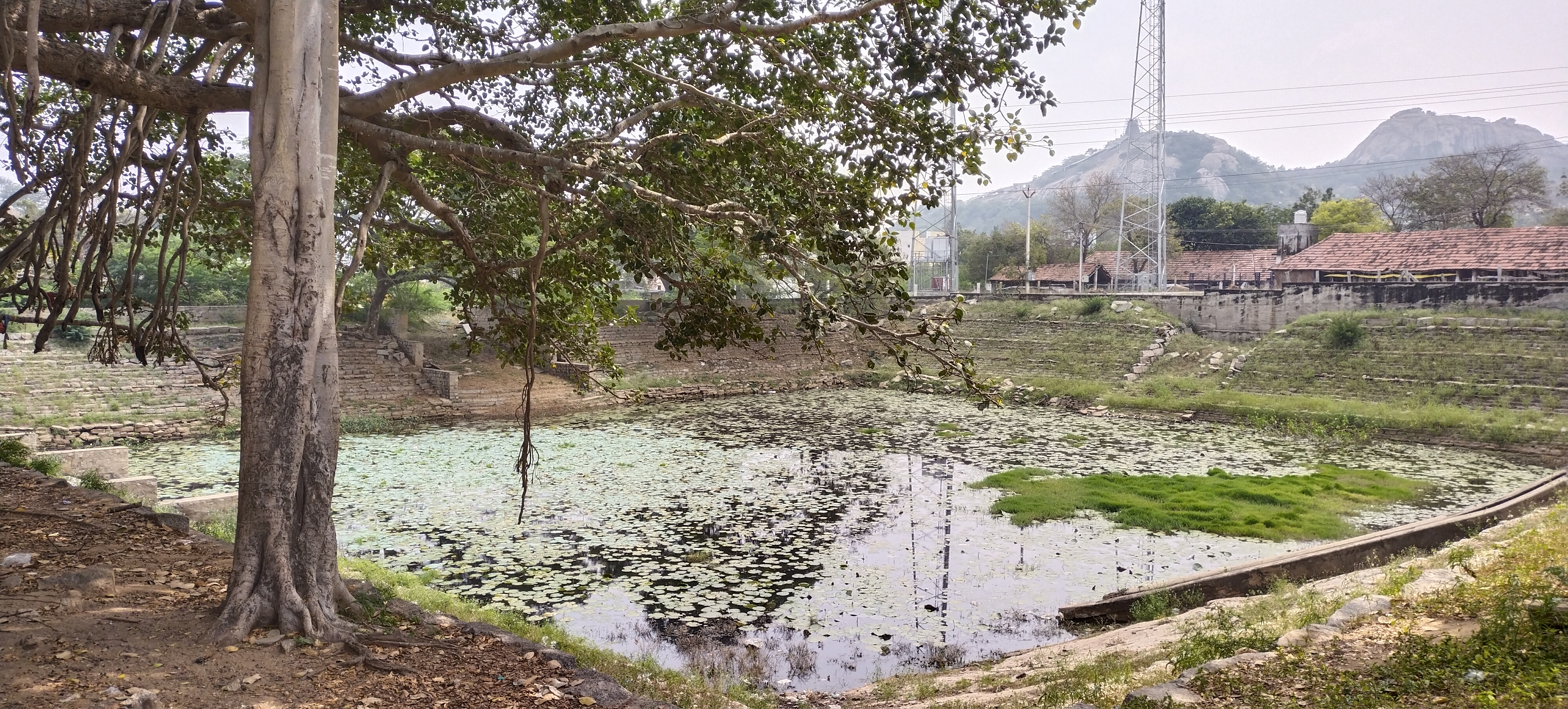
The temple tank

== See also ==
- Thirukkadigai
- Hanuman
