= R. Gandhi =

Indian politician

Cabinet Minister Government of Tamil Nadu
- In office 7 May 2021 – 5 May 2026
- Minister: Minister of Handlooms and textiles Endowments
- Chief Minister: Muthuvel Karunanidhi Stalin

Member of the Tamil Nadu legislative assembly
- In office 19 May 2016 – 5 May 2026
- Constituency: Ranipet
- In office 10 May 1996 – 14 May 2001
- Constituency: Ranipet
- In office 11 May 2006 – 13 May 2011
- Constituency: Ranipet

Personal details
- Born: 5 September 1945 (age 80) Ranipet, Vellore district (now in) Ranipet district, Tamil Nadu, india
- Party: Dravida Munnetra Kazhagam
- Children: Vinoth Gandhi
- Occupation: Politician

R. Gandhi is an Indian politician and incumbent Minister for Handlooms and Textiles of Tamil Nadu. He was elected to the Tamil Nadu legislative assembly from Ranipet constituency as a Dravida Munnetra Kazhagam (DMK) candidate in 1996, 2006, 2016 and 2021 elections. He was DMK Vellore district secretary (United Vellore district) for more than two decades. Also now he is Ranipet district DMK secretary.

== Electoral performance ==
2021 Tamil Nadu Legislative Assembly election: Ranipet
Party	Candidate	Votes	%	±%
DMK	R. Gandhi	103,291	50.18%	+7.34
AIADMK	S. M. Sugumar	86,793	42.17%	+3.46
NTK	V. Shylaja	10,234	4.97%	New
MNM	M. Atham Basha	2,762	1.34%	New
NOTA	NOTA	1,632	0.79%	−0.32
Margin of victory		16,498	8.02%	3.88%
Turnout		205,830	77.24%	0.17%
Rejected ballots		320	0.16%	
Registered electors		266,481		
DMK hold		Swing	7.34%	

2016 Tamil Nadu Legislative Assembly election: Ranipet
Party	Candidate	Votes	%	±%
DMK	R. Gandhi	81,724	42.85%	−1.3
AIADMK	C. Elumalai	73,828	38.71%	−14.44
PMK	M. K. Murali	23,850	12.50%	New
DMDK	S. Nithiyanandham	5,906	3.10%	New
NOTA	NOTA	2,121	1.11%	New
BJP	V. Nagaraj	1,342	0.70%	New
Margin of victory		7,896	4.14%	−4.86%
Turnout		190,742	77.07%	−2.35%
Registered electors		247,501		
DMK gain from AIADMK		Swing	-10.30%	

2011 Tamil Nadu Legislative Assembly election: Ranipet
Party	Candidate	Votes	%	±%
AIADMK	A. Mohammedjan	83,834	53.14%	+17.21
DMK	R. Gandhi	69,633	44.14%	−10.87
Independent	R. Murugan	1,213	0.77%	New
BSP	S. Sasikumar	842	0.53%	New
Margin of victory		14,201	9.00%	−10.07%
Turnout		157,749	79.41%	5.32%
Registered electors		198,641		
AIADMK gain from DMK		Swing	-1.86%	

2006 Tamil Nadu Legislative Assembly election: Ranipet
Party	Candidate	Votes	%	±%
DMK	R. Gandhi	92,584	55.01%	+15.54
AIADMK	R. Thamizharasan	60,489	35.94%	−20.43
DMDK	N. Paari	9,058	5.38%	New
Independent	K. Shakthivel Nathan	1,687	1.00%	New
Independent	R. Rajesh Kumar	1,618	0.96%	New
BJP	V. Kuppusamy	1,598	0.95%	New
Margin of victory		32,095	19.07%	2.17%
Turnout		168,313	74.09%	9.01%
Registered electors		227,170		
DMK gain from AIADMK		Swing	-1.36%	

2001 Tamil Nadu Legislative Assembly election: Ranipet
Party	Candidate	Votes	%	±%
AIADMK	M. S. Chandrasekaran	83,250	56.37%	+29.87
DMK	R. Gandhi	58,287	39.47%	−11.34
Independent	A. K. A. Manavalan	1,951	1.32%	New
MDMK	J. Damodaran	1,939	1.31%	−4.59
Independent	Prabakaran M	987	0.67%	New
Margin of victory		24,963	16.90%	−7.40%
Turnout		147,686	65.08%	−4.77%
Registered electors		227,057		
AIADMK gain from DMK		Swing	5.57%	

1996 Tamil Nadu Legislative Assembly election: Ranipet
Party	Candidate	Votes	%	±%
DMK	R. Gandhi	71,346	50.80%	+24.38
AIADMK	M. Masilamani	37,219	26.50%	−26.79
PMK	K. L. Elavazagan	21,987	15.66%	New
MDMK	J. Hassain	8,293	5.91%	New
Margin of victory		34,127	24.30%	−2.56%
Turnout		140,434	69.85%	1.38%
Registered electors		208,349		
DMK gain from AIADMK		Swing	-2.49%	
