= Arcot block =

The Arcot block is a revenue block in the Ranipet district of Tamil Nadu, India. It has a total of 39 panchayat villages.
