= Melvisharam =

Municipality in Ranipet, Tamilnadu

- Municipality
- Location in Ranipet, Tamil Nadu
- Coordinates: 12.9333°N 79.2833°E
- Country: India
- State: Tamil Nadu
- District: Ranipet
- Talukas: Walajapet taluk

Government
  - Type: First Grade Municipality
  - Body: Melvisharam municipality

Area
  - Total: 8.86 km^{2} (3.42 sq mi)
- Elevation: 175.86 m (577.0 ft)

Population (2011)
  - Total: 44,786
  - Density: 5,050/km^{2} (13,100/sq mi)
- Time zone: UTC+5:30 (IST)
- PIN: 632 509
- Telephone code: 04172
- Vehicle registration: TN 73
- Vidhan Sabha constituency: Ranipet
- Civic agency: melvisharam municipality
- Website: ranipet.nic.in//

Melvisharam is a town in Ranipet district of the Indian state of Tamil Nadu. It is 7 km (4.3 mi) from Ranipet, and 17 km (11 mi) from Vellore.

Melvisharam was constituted in 1951 as a Town Panchayat and was subsequently upgraded to a municipality on 1 October 2005. The town has 21 Municipal wards. As per the 2011 census, the town had a population of 44,786. The seasonal river Palar flows on the North side of the town.

== Topography ==
Almost all of the Melvisharam consists of flat terrain. The general slope is towards south east and the small streams that rise in Vellore hills situated in the west eventually fall into Palar river. The topography of Melvisharam town in plain and is situated at an altitude of 175.86 metres above mean sea level. The wind direction is predominant towards south west during the whole of the year. However, during summer it is from south west to north east.

== Climate ==
The taluk has fairly healthy climate. The study area has distinctly high temperature in hot months and cold weather is for a short duration.

The climatic seasons are generally classified as follows:

- Cold season from November to January with a mean maximum and minimum temperature of 29 C and 18.4 C respectively.
- Warm season from February to March and from July to October with a mean maximum and minimum temperature of 35 C and 19 C respectively.
- Hot season from April to June with a mean maximum and minimum temperature of 38.5 C and 24 C respectively.

The main maximum temperature during summer normal occurs in the month of May and June while the minimum temperature in winter occurs in January.

The north –east monsoon gives most of the rains. The average rainfall for a year is found to be 996.76 mm. The maximum rainfall occurs during the month of September and October due to north-east monsoon.

== Economy ==
The leather industries dominate the economy of Melvisharam. Its part of Ranipet urban agglomeration which is known for large manufacturing of leather products.

== Demographics ==
Religious census
Religion	Percent(%)
Muslim	76.12%
Hindu	22.97%
Christian	0.77%
Sikh	0.0%
Buddhist	0.0%
Jain	0.0%
Other	0.12%
No religion	0.0%

According to 2011 census, Melvisharam had a population of 44,786 with a sex-ratio of 977 females for every 1,000 males, much above the national average of 929. A total of 5,508 were under the age of six, constituting 2,874 males and 2,634 females. Scheduled Castes and Scheduled Tribes accounted for 8.99% and .03% of the population respectively. The average literacy of the town was 73.23%, compared to the national average of 72.99%. The town had a total of : 8906 households. There were a total of 15,753 workers, comprising 50 cultivators, 114 main agricultural labourers, 3,299 in house hold industries, 10,830 other workers, 1,460 marginal workers, 16 marginal cultivators, 37 marginal agricultural labourers, 235 marginal workers in household industries and 1,172 other marginal workers. As per the religious census of 2011, Melvisharam (M) had 76.12% Muslims, 22.97% Hindus, 0.77% Christians, 0.0% Sikhs, 0.0% Buddhists, 0.0% Jains, 0.12% following other religions and 0.0% following no religion or did not indicate any religious preference.

== Politics ==
Melvisharam is part of the Ranipet Assembly constituency and Arakkonam Lok Sabha constituency.
