= Nemili block =

The Nemili block is a revenue block in the Ranipet district of Tamil Nadu, India. It has a total of 52 panchayat villages.
