= N. G. Parthiban =

Indian politician

Personal details
- Party: Dravida Munnetra Kazhagam
- Parent: C. Gopal Mudaliyar

N. G. Parthiban is a politician from Tamil Nadu, India. He was elected from the Sholinghur constituency to the Fifteenth Tamil Nadu Legislative Assembly as a member of the All India Anna Dravida Munnetra Kazhagam political party in the 2016 Tamil Nadu legislative assembly elections.

He was one of the 18 members who were disqualified by Speaker P. Dhanapal as they withdrew support to Chief Minister Edappadi K. Palaniswami and became loyal to rebel leader T.T.V. Dhinakaran and joined his party Amma Makkal Munnetra Kazhagam. His father C. Gopal Mudaliyar was ex MLA of Sholinghur constituency.

He was born in Sengunthar Kaikola Mudaliyar(Echaan Gothram) community.

His father C. Gopal Mudaliyar was ex MLA of Sholinghur constituency.
