= D. Arul Anbarasu =

Indian politician

D. Arul Anbarasu was elected to the Tamil Nadu Legislative Assembly from the Sholinghur constituency in the 2006 election. He was a candidate of the Indian National Congress (INC) party.
