= G. Kapil =

Indian politician (born 1994)

Ganesan Kapil (born 1994) is an Indian politician from Tamil Nadu. He is a member of the Tamil Nadu Legislative Assembly from Sholinghur Assembly constituency in Ranipet district representing Tamilaga Vettri Kazhagam.

== Early life ==
Kapil is from Sholinghur, Ranipet district, Tamil Nadu. He is the son of Ganesan. He completed his MBBS at Sri Lakshmi Narayana Medical College, Puducherry in 2017. He declared assets worth Rs.2 crore in his affidavit to the Election Commission of India.

== Career ==
Kapil became an MLA for the first time winning the 2026 Tamil Nadu Legislative Assembly election from Sholinghur Assembly constituency representing Tamilaga Vettri Kazhagam. He polled 84,506 votes and defeated his nearest opponent K. Saravanan of the Pattali Makkal Katchi, by a margin of 5,686 votes.
