= P. R. Manogar =

Indian politician

P.R.Manogar
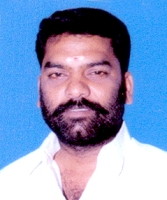
- Occupation: Politician

P. R. Manogar is an Indian politician and former member of the Tamil Nadu Legislative Assembly from the Sholingur constituency. He represented the Desiya Murpokku Dravida Kazhagam party.
