= Nemili =

- Taluk
- Location in Tamil Nadu, India
- Coordinates: 12°35′55″N 78°30′55″E
- Country: India
- State: Tamil Nadu
- District: Ranipet

Area
  - Total: 570.37 km^{2} (220.22 sq mi)

Population (2011)
  - Total: 213,395
  - Density: 374.13/km^{2} (969.00/sq mi)

Languages
  - Official: Tamil
- Time zone: UTC+5:30 (IST)
- PIN: 631051
- Vehicle registration: 23/73
- Sex ratio: 1:1 ♂/♀

Nemili is a Taluk in Ranipet district of Tamil Nadu state, announced on 31 August 2015 by Tamil Nadu Chief Minister Selvi J.Jayalalitha. Before becoming a separate taluk, it was a town panchyat under Arakkonam Taluk. It is part of the Chennai Metropolitan Area.It is located in the Ranipet district about 72 kilometres from the state capital of Chennai. The major businesses are farming, hand loom and power looms. Nemili itself is a panchayat town in Ranipet District in the Indian state of Tamil Nadu.

== See also ==
- Vettangulam
- Arakkonam
