= Arcot taluk =

Arcot taluk is a taluk in Ranipet district of the Indian state of Tamil Nadu. The headquarters of the taluk is the town of Arcot.

== Demographics ==
According to the 2011 census, the taluk of Arcot had a population of 247,118 with 122,941 males and 124,177 females. There were 1010 women for every 1000 men. The taluk had a literacy rate of 71.68%. Child population in the age group below 6 was 12,439 Males and 11,859 Females.

== Villages ==
Villages within Arcot taluk include:

- Ozhalai
- Ponnam Mangalam
