= Thiruvalluvar University =

Public university in Vellore, Tamil Nadu

- Motto in English: Lead them to lead
- Type: State
- Established: 2002; 24 years ago
- Affiliations: UGC
- Chancellor: Governor of Tamil Nadu
- Vice-Chancellor: Vacant
- Location: Vellore, Tamil Nadu, India; 13°01′46″N 79°12′36″E
- Campus: Urban, 112 acres (0.45 km^{2})
- Website: www.tvu.edu.in

Thiruvalluvar University is a public state university in the city of Vellore, Tamil Nadu, India. It was established by the Government of Tamil Nadu, under the Thiruvalluvar University Act, 2002 (Tamil Nadu Act 32 of 2002). The university was named after the Tamil poet and sage Thiruvalluvar.

It began functioning as the 'Post Graduate Extension Centre of University of Madras', at the Fort Campus, Vellore. After bifurcation from the University of Madras, Thiruvalluvar University moved to a new campus at Serkadu, Vellore. The university affiliates Arts and Science colleges under the area comprising the districts of Ranipet, Tirupattur, Tiruvannamalai, Vellore. It has its jurisdiction over districts of Vellore, Thiruvannamalai, Villupuram and Cuddalore in the State of Tamil Nadu.

== Campus ==
University campus is spread over an area of 112 acres at Serkadu about 16 km from the Vellore city on NH-4. The campus was inaugurated by Karunanidhi on 27 November 2010. It was constructed at a cost of ₹ 203.5 million.

The campus has an administrative block, academic and computer science blocks, and a library.

== Administration ==
- Chancellor : Governor of Tamil Nadu
- Pro-Chancellor :
- Vice-Chancellor :

== Departments ==
University has following departments which offer several courses.

- Department of Economics
- Department of Zoology
- Department of Chemistry
- Department of Biotechnology
- Department of Mathematics
- Department of Tamil
- Department of English
- Department of Computer Science
- Department of Physics
- Department of Commerce

== Course offered ==
Courses offered at the university are

=== Biotechnology ===
- M.Sc. (Biotechnology)
- Ph.D. (Biotechnology)

=== Chemistry ===
- M.Sc. (Chemistry)
- Ph.D (Chemistry)

=== Zoology ===
- M.Sc. (Zoology)
- Ph.D. (Zoology)

=== Mathematics ===
- M.Sc. (Mathematics)
- Ph.D. (Mathematics)

=== Economics ===
- M.A. (Economics)
- Ph.D.(Economics)

=== Tamil ===
- M.A. (Tamil)
- Ph.D (Tamil)

=== English ===
- M.A. (English)
- Ph.D.(English)

=== Computer Science ===
- M.Sc. (C.S)
- Ph.D (C.S)
