= Ranipet Assembly constituency =

State Legislative Assembly Constituency in Tamil Nadu

Coordinates: 12.95°N 79.32°E

Ranipet
- Constituency No. 41 for the Tamil Nadu Legislative Assembly

Constituency details
- Country: India
- Region: South India
- State: Tamil Nadu
- District: Ranipet
- Lok Sabha constituency: Arakkonam
- Established: 1951
- Total electors: 2,48,962

Member of Legislative Assembly
- 17th Tamil Nadu Legislative Assembly
- Incumbent I. Thahira
- Party: TVK
- Elected year: 2026

Ranipet is a legislative assembly constituency in Ranipettai district in the Indian state of Tamil Nadu. Its State Assembly Constituency number is 41. It consists of a portion of Walajah taluk. It comes under Arakkonam Lok Sabha constituency. It is one of the 234 State Legislative Assembly constituencies in Tamil Nadu, in India. Elections and winners in the constituency are listed below.

== Members of Legislative Assembly ==
=== Madras State ===
Year	Winner	Party
1952	Kadir Sheriff	Indian National Congress
1957	Chandrasekaran	Indian National Congress
1962	Abdul Khaleel	Dravida Munnetra Kazhagam
1967	A. G. Sahib	Independent

=== Tamil Nadu ===
Year	Winner	Party
1971	K. A. Wahab	Independent
1977	Durai Murugan	Dravida Munnetra Kazhagam
1980	Durai Murugan	Dravida Munnetra Kazhagam
1984	M. Kadirvelu	Indian National Congress
1989	J. Hassain	Independent
1991	N. G. Venugopal	All India Anna Dravida Munnetra Kazhagam
1996	R. Gandhi	Dravida Munnetra Kazhagam
2001	M. S. Chandrasekaran	All India Anna Dravida Munnetra Kazhagam
2006	R. Gandhi	Dravida Munnetra Kazhagam
2011	A. Mohammedjan	All India Anna Dravida Munnetra Kazhagam
2016	R. Gandhi	Dravida Munnetra Kazhagam
2021	R. Gandhi	Dravida Munnetra Kazhagam
2026	I. Thahira	Tamilaga Vettri Kazhagam

== Election results ==
Vote share of winning candidates
2026	41.24%
2021	50.18%
2016	42.85%
2011	53.14%
2006	55.01%
2001	56.37%
1996	50.80%
1991	53.29%
1989	30.08%
1984	55.60%
1980	53.70%
1977	43.53%
1971	53.96%
1967	45.14%
1962	39.32%
1957	33.63%
1952	38.65%

=== 2026 ===
2026 Tamil Nadu Legislative Assembly election: Ranipet
Party	Candidate	Votes	%	±%
TVK	Thahira	91,149	41.24	New
DMK	R. Gandhi	85,362	38.62	▼11.56
TMC(M) (BJP)	V. M. Karthikeyan	32,060	14.5	
NTK	Thaarikha Salman	7,236	3.27	▼1.70
NOTA	NOTA	1,209	0.55	▼0.24
Independent	A. Nareshkumar	754	0.34	New
BSP	J. Jeniferjanet	620	0.28	New
Independent	K. Sakthivel Nathan	533	0.24	New
Independent	J. Hassain	517	0.23	New
TVK	N. Viswanathan	370	0.17	New
Independent	V. Dharmendiran	356	0.16	New
ACDP	S. Munisamy	229	0.10	New
Independent	S. Jayaprakash	228	0.10	New
Independent	V. Suresh	166	0.08	New
Independent	J. Mohan	155	0.07	New
Independent	N. Sugumar	94	0.04	New
Margin of victory		5,787	2.62	▼5.40
Turnout		2,21,038	88.78	▲11.54
Registered electors		2,48,962		▼17,519
TVK gain from DMK		Swing	▲41.24	

=== 2021 ===
2021 Tamil Nadu Legislative Assembly election: Ranipet
Party	Candidate	Votes	%	±%
DMK	R. Gandhi	103,291	50.18%	+7.34
AIADMK	S. M. Sukumar	86,793	42.17%	+3.46
NTK	V. Shylaja	10,234	4.97%	New
MNM	M. Atham Basha	2,762	1.34%	New
NOTA	NOTA	1,632	0.79%	−0.32
Margin of victory		16,498	8.02%	3.88%
Turnout		205,830	77.24%	0.17%
Rejected ballots		320	0.16%	
Registered electors		266,481		
DMK hold		Swing	7.34%	

=== 2016 ===
2016 Tamil Nadu Legislative Assembly election: Ranipet
Party	Candidate	Votes	%	±%
DMK	R. Gandhi	81,724	42.85%	−1.3
AIADMK	C. Elumalai	73,828	38.71%	−14.44
PMK	M. K. Murali	23,850	12.50%	New
DMDK	S. Nithiyanandham	5,906	3.10%	New
NOTA	NOTA	2,121	1.11%	New
BJP	V. Nagaraj	1,342	0.70%	New
Margin of victory		7,896	4.14%	−4.86%
Turnout		190,742	77.07%	−2.35%
Registered electors		247,501		
DMK gain from AIADMK		Swing	-10.30%	

=== 2011 ===
2011 Tamil Nadu Legislative Assembly election: Ranipet
Party	Candidate	Votes	%	±%
AIADMK	A. Mohammedjan	83,834	53.14%	+17.21
DMK	R. Gandhi	69,633	44.14%	−10.87
Independent	R. Murugan	1,213	0.77%	New
BSP	S. Sasikumar	842	0.53%	New
Margin of victory		14,201	9.00%	−10.07%
Turnout		157,749	79.41%	5.32%
Registered electors		198,641		
AIADMK gain from DMK		Swing	-1.86%	

=== 2006 ===
2006 Tamil Nadu Legislative Assembly election: Ranipet
Party	Candidate	Votes	%	±%
DMK	R. Gandhi	92,584	55.01%	+15.54
AIADMK	R. Thamizharasan	60,489	35.94%	−20.43
DMDK	N. Paari	9,058	5.38%	New
Independent	K. Shakthivel Nathan	1,687	1.00%	New
Independent	R. Rajesh Kumar	1,618	0.96%	New
BJP	V. Kuppusamy	1,598	0.95%	New
Margin of victory		32,095	19.07%	2.17%
Turnout		168,313	74.09%	9.01%
Registered electors		227,170		
DMK gain from AIADMK		Swing	-1.36%	

=== 2001 ===
2001 Tamil Nadu Legislative Assembly election: Ranipet
Party	Candidate	Votes	%	±%
AIADMK	M. S. Chandrasekaran	83,250	56.37%	+29.87
DMK	R. Gandhi	58,287	39.47%	−11.34
Independent	A. K. A. Manavalan	1,951	1.32%	New
MDMK	J. Damodaran	1,939	1.31%	−4.59
Independent	Prabakaran M	987	0.67%	New
Margin of victory		24,963	16.90%	−7.40%
Turnout		147,686	65.08%	−4.77%
Registered electors		227,057		
AIADMK gain from DMK		Swing	5.57%	

=== 1996 ===
1996 Tamil Nadu Legislative Assembly election: Ranipet
Party	Candidate	Votes	%	±%
DMK	R. Gandhi	71,346	50.80%	+24.38
AIADMK	M. Masilamani	37,219	26.50%	−26.79
PMK	K. L. Elavazagan	21,987	15.66%	New
MDMK	J. Hassain	8,293	5.91%	New
Margin of victory		34,127	24.30%	−2.56%
Turnout		140,434	69.85%	1.38%
Registered electors		208,349		
DMK gain from AIADMK		Swing	-2.49%	

=== 1991 ===
1991 Tamil Nadu Legislative Assembly election: Ranipet
Party	Candidate	Votes	%	±%
AIADMK	N. G. Venugopal	65,204	53.29%	+36.22
DMK	M. Abdul Latheef	32,332	26.42%	+0.62
PMK	P. Natesan Ananthalai	23,064	18.85%	New
BJP	N. B. Ventaraman	1,345	1.10%	New
Margin of victory		32,872	26.87%	22.59%
Turnout		122,356	68.47%	11.04%
Registered electors		185,387		
AIADMK gain from Independent		Swing	23.21%	

=== 1989 ===
1989 Tamil Nadu Legislative Assembly election: Ranipet
Party	Candidate	Votes	%	±%
Independent	J. Hassain	27,724	30.08%	New
DMK	M. Kuppusami	23,784	25.80%	−7.26
AIADMK	S. Kovi Mohannan	15,738	17.07%	New
INC	M. Kadirvel	10,813	11.73%	−43.87
Independent	L. Vilvanathan	10,088	10.94%	New
Independent	C. Govindaraj	1,755	1.90%	New
Independent	K. Selvaraj	650	0.71%	New
Margin of victory		3,940	4.27%	−18.27%
Turnout		92,179	57.43%	−18.87%
Registered electors		164,533		
Independent gain from INC		Swing	-25.52%	

=== 1984 ===
1984 Tamil Nadu Legislative Assembly election: Ranipet
Party	Candidate	Votes	%	±%
INC	M. Kadirvelu	56,068	55.60%	New
DMK	V. M. Abdul Jabbar	33,337	33.06%	−20.64
Independent	R. Sundaramoorthy	9,211	9.13%	New
Independent	M. Abdul Gafoor	686	0.68%	New
Independent	R. Kulandaivelu	660	0.65%	New
Margin of victory		22,731	22.54%	13.75%
Turnout		100,844	76.31%	10.10%
Registered electors		138,811		
INC gain from DMK		Swing	1.90%	

=== 1980 ===
1980 Tamil Nadu Legislative Assembly election: Ranipet
Party	Candidate	Votes	%	±%
DMK	Durai Murugan	44,318	53.70%	+10.17
AIADMK	N. Renu	37,064	44.91%	New
Independent	R. T. S. Murthy	431	0.52%	New
Margin of victory		7,254	8.79%	−12.06%
Turnout		82,529	66.21%	3.25%
Registered electors		126,741		
DMK hold		Swing	10.17%	

=== 1977 ===
1977 Tamil Nadu Legislative Assembly election: Ranipet
Party	Candidate	Votes	%	±%
DMK	Durai Murugan	31,940	43.53%	New
Independent	K. A. Wahab	16,643	22.68%	New
INC	A. Sampath Narasimhan	14,838	20.22%	−25.82
JP	Abdul Gaffor	7,584	10.34%	New
Independent	M. A. K. Siddiqui	1,253	1.71%	New
Independent	D. Arumugam	862	1.17%	New
Margin of victory		15,297	20.85%	12.93%
Turnout		73,377	62.96%	−10.01%
Registered electors		118,555		
DMK gain from Independent		Swing	-10.43%	

=== 1971 ===
1971 Tamil Nadu Legislative Assembly election: Ranipet
Party	Candidate	Votes	%	±%
Independent	K. A Wahab	36,357	53.96%	New
INC	A. G. Ranganatha Naicker	31,022	46.04%	+2.49
Margin of victory		5,335	7.92%	6.33%
Turnout		67,379	72.97%	−4.67%
Registered electors		99,025		
Independent hold		Swing	8.82%	

=== 1967 ===
1967 Madras Legislative Assembly election: Ranipet
Party	Candidate	Votes	%	±%
Independent	A. G. Sahib	30,011	45.14%	New
INC	S. K. Sheriff	28,953	43.55%	+5.64
Independent	C. K. Gounder	3,645	5.48%	New
Independent	V. C. Kesavan	1,936	2.91%	New
Independent	K. Jagannathan	989	1.49%	New
Independent	A. K. Ukkirapani	548	0.82%	New
Independent	S. S. Sundararaman	406	0.61%	New
Margin of victory		1,058	1.59%	0.18%
Turnout		66,488	77.64%	4.12%
Registered electors		91,628		
Independent gain from DMK		Swing	5.82%	

=== 1962 ===
1962 Madras Legislative Assembly election: Ranipet
Party	Candidate	Votes	%	±%
DMK	Abdul Khaleel	24,082	39.32%	New
INC	A. E. Chandrasekara Naicker	23,218	37.91%	+4.27
We Tamils	Varadarajan	9,562	15.61%	New
Independent	Ganesan	2,429	3.97%	New
Independent	T. Doraiswamy	1,183	1.93%	New
Independent	V. Vollikkannu	391	0.64%	New
Independent	Munisami Naicker	384	0.63%	New
Margin of victory		864	1.41%	−3.01%
Turnout		61,249	73.52%	21.29%
Registered electors		87,522		
DMK gain from INC		Swing	5.68%	

=== 1957 ===
1957 Madras Legislative Assembly election: Ranipet
Party	Candidate	Votes	%	±%
INC	Chandrasekara Naicker	12,386	33.63%	−5.01
Independent	R. A. Subhan	10,759	29.22%	New
Independent	C. A. Varanat Han	9,164	24.89%	New
Independent	Utharanathan	2,635	7.16%	New
Independent	Srinivasan	1,127	3.06%	New
Independent	M. Rangaswamy	754	2.05%	New
Margin of victory		1,627	4.42%	−10.56%
Turnout		36,825	52.23%	−2.78%
Registered electors		70,501		
INC hold		Swing	-5.01%	

=== 1952 ===
1952 Madras Legislative Assembly election: Ranipet
Party	Candidate	Votes	%	±%
INC	Kadir Sheriff	17,934	38.65%	New
Commonweal Party	Munuswami Gounder	10,983	23.67%	New
Independent	Subhan	6,489	13.98%	New
Independent	Margabandu Sarma	3,031	6.53%	New
Independent	Munia Pillai	2,500	5.39%	New
KMPP	Varadarajan	2,149	4.63%	New
Akhil Bharat Hindu Maha Sabha	Rajavelu Mudaliar	1,255	2.70%	New
Independent	Rangaswami	1,114	2.40%	New
Socialist Party (India)	A. Rangaswami Chettiar	948	2.04%	New
Margin of victory		6,951	14.98%	
Turnout		46,403	55.02%	
Registered electors		84,346		
INC win (new seat)				
