= Walajapet taluk =

Coordinates: 13.00°N 79.314°E

Walajapet taluk or Wallajah taluk is a taluk in Ranipet district of the Indian state of Tamil Nadu. The headquarters of the taluk is the town of Walajapet.

== Demographics ==
According to the 2011 census, the taluk of Wallajah had a population of 440,488 with 219,124 males and 221,364 females. There were 1010 women for every 1000 men. The taluk had a literacy rate of 73.83%. Child population in the age group below 6 years were 23,574 Males and 21,993 Females.
