= Ranipet =

- Municipality
- Ranipet, Tamil Nadu
- Coordinates: 12°56′55.3″N 79°19′08.4″E
- Country: India
- State: Tamil Nadu
- District: Ranipet district

Government
  - Type: Selection Grade Municipality
  - Body: Ranipet Municipality

Area
  - Municipality: 8.52 km^{2} (3.29 sq mi)
  - Urban: 85.32 km^{2} (32.94 sq mi)
- Elevation: 208 m (682 ft)

Population (2011)
  - Municipality: 50,764
  - Density: 5,960/km^{2} (15,400/sq mi)
  - Urban: 264,330
  - Urban density: 3,098/km^{2} (8,024/sq mi)

Languages
  - Official: Tamil
- Time zone: UTC+5:30 (IST)
- PIN: 632401 to 632406
- Telephone code: 91 4172
- Vehicle registration: TN-73
- Lok Sabha constituency: Arakkonam Lok Sabha constituency
- Vidhan Sabha constituency: Ranipet Assembly constituency
- Nearest city: Vellore
- Civic agency: Ranipet municipality
- Website: https://vrzconnect.in/ https://ranipet.nic.in/

Ranipet (lit. Queen's colony) is an industrial town and the administrative headquarters of Ranipet district in the Indian state of Tamil Nadu. It is located on the Northern banks of the Palar River. It is a Tri-City with the adjacent municipalities of Walajapet, Arcot and Melvisharam. It is located about 115 kilometres (71 mi) west of Chennai, and about 26 kilometres (16 mi) east of Vellore. Ranipet is located on the Mumbai–Chennai arm of the Golden Quadrilateral. Ranipet is renowned for its thriving industrial base, which includes numerous small, medium, and large-scale industries, particularly in sectors such as leather tanning, chemical manufacturing, and engineering.

== History ==
Ranipet was built around the year 1771 by Sadut-ulla-khan, the Nawab of Carnatic, in honor of the youthful widow of Desingh Raja of Gingee, who committed Sati upon her husband's death. Out of respect for Desingh Raja's valour and his wife's devotion, the Nawab formed a new village opposite to Arcot on the Northern bank of the Palar River and named it Ranipet.

The town gained importance since the establishment of the European cantonment. About a mile west of Ranipet is a remarkable thope extending along the Palar river, for a distance of 4.8 km (3.0 mi) which is known as 'Navlakh Bagh'. It is supposed to contain 9 lakhs of trees and hence the name "Navlakh Bagh". South India's first rail operation was operated between Royapuram to Ranipet.

On 15 August 2019, Ranipet became the district headquarters for the Ranipet district after the announcement of the newly created district.

On 21 October 2021, Arakkonam and Nemili taluks of Ranipet district were added to the Chennai Metropolitan Area.

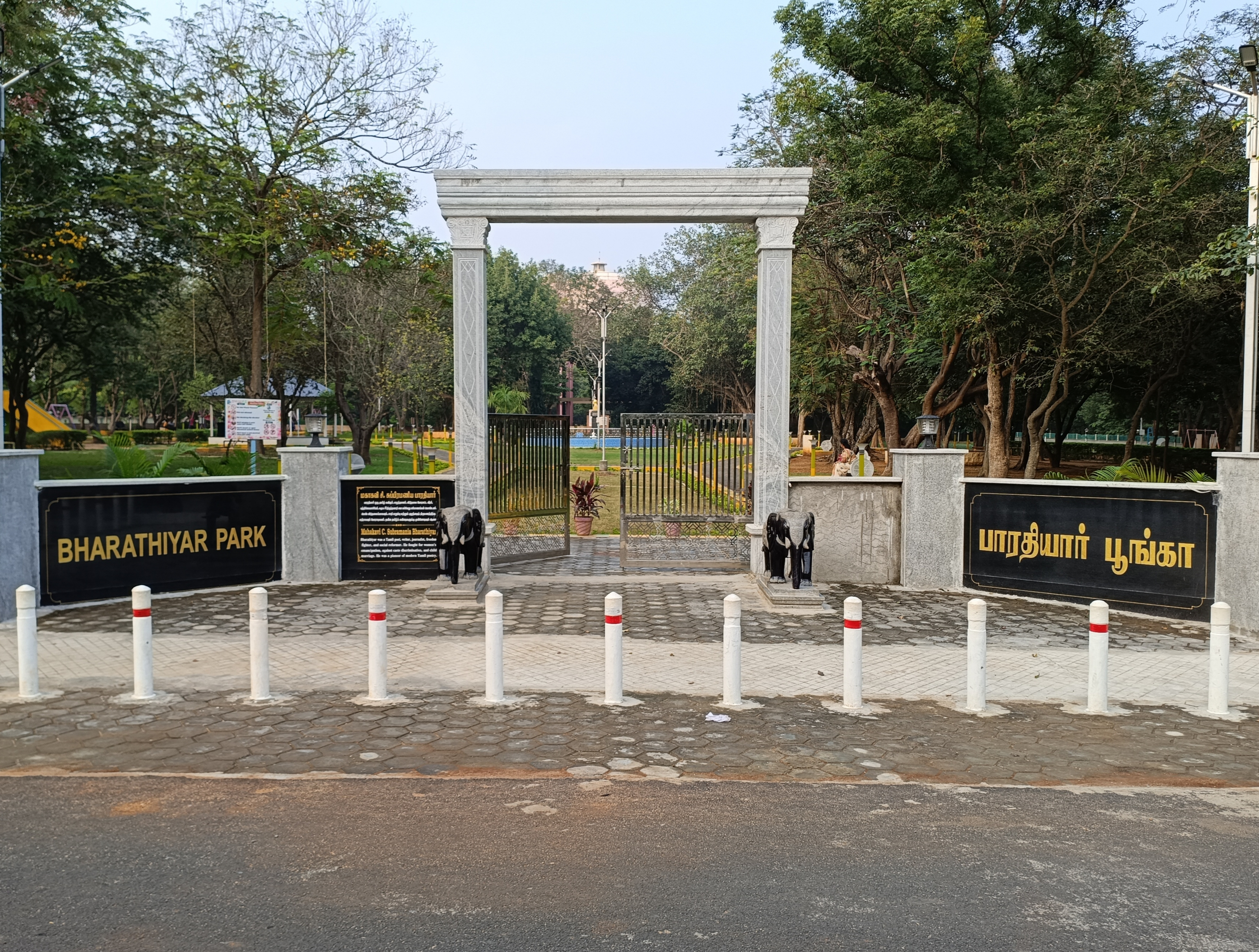
Bharathiyar Park, Ranipet

== Demographics ==
Religious census
Religion	Percent(%)
Hindu	76.42%
Muslim	15.19%
Christian	8.02%
Sikh	0.01%
Buddhist	0.04%
Jain	0.27%
Other	0.03%
No religion	0.02%

According to 2011 census, Ranipet municipality had a population of 50,764 with a sex-ratio of 1,091 females for every 1,000 males, much above the national average of 929. Ranipet City (Urban Agglomeration) had a population of 2,64,330 spanning over 85.32 Km² as of 2011 Census. A total of 5,124 were under the age of six, constituting 2,564 males and 2,560 females. Scheduled Castes and Scheduled Tribes accounted for 34.3% and .04% of the population respectively. The average literacy of the town was 81.%, compared to the national average of 72.99%. The town had a total of 12275 households. There were a total of 18,243 workers, comprising 45 cultivators, 100 main agricultural labourers, 373 in household industries, 16,095 other workers, 1,630 marginal workers, 15 marginal cultivators, 29 marginal agricultural labourers, 95 marginal workers in household industries and 1,491 other marginal workers. As per the religious census of 2011, Ranipet had 76.42% Hindus, 15.19% Muslims, 8.02% Christians, 0.01% Sikhs, 0.04% Buddhists, 0.27% Jains, 0.03% following other religions and 0.02% following no religion or did not indicate any religious preference.

== Politics ==
R.Gandhi is the sitting MLA of DMK. Ranipet assembly constituency is part of Arakkonam (Lok Sabha constituency).
