= Ranipet district =

- District of Tamil Nadu
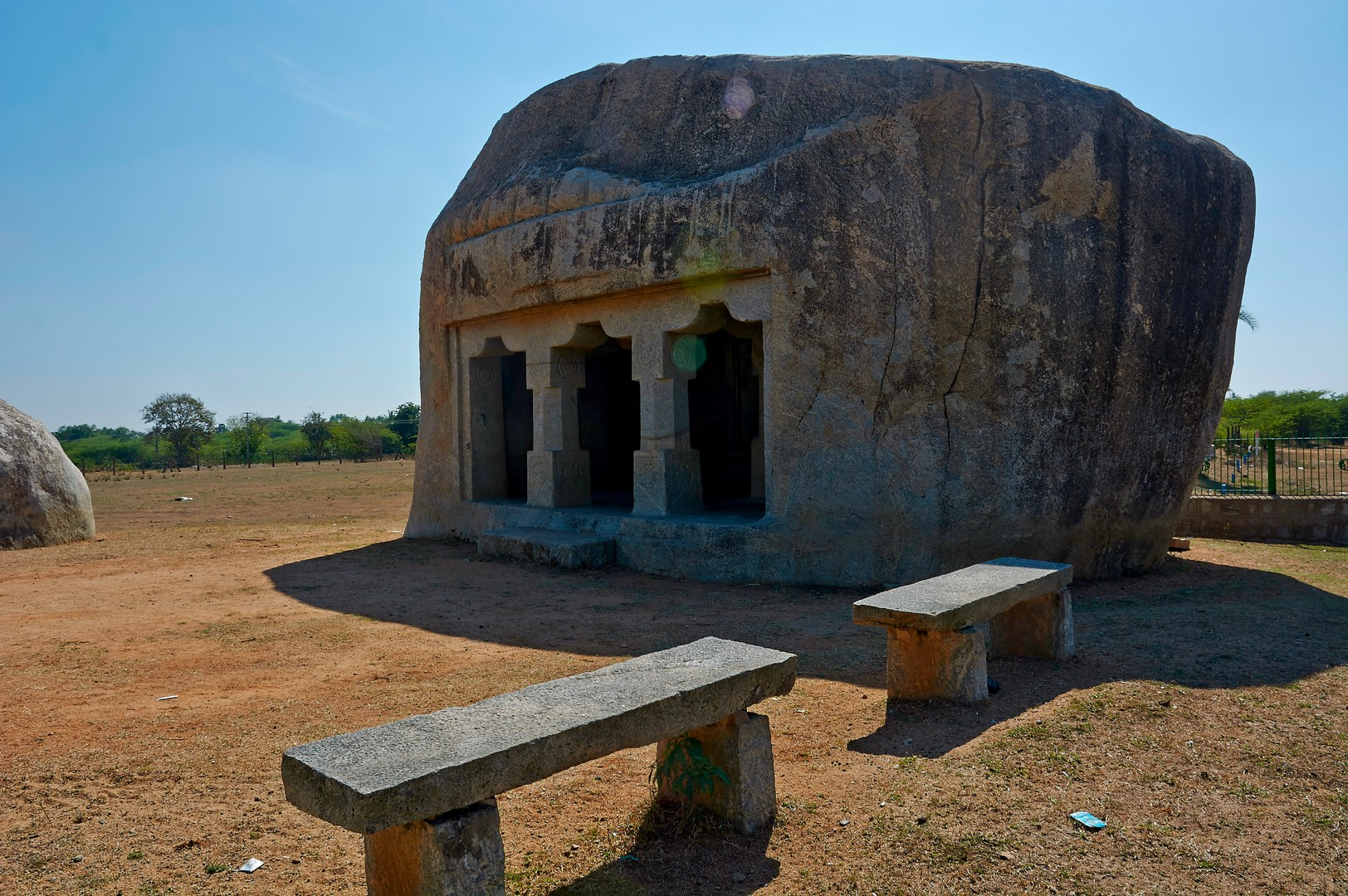
- Rock-cut temple, Mahendravadi

- Location in Tamil Nadu
- Ranipet district
- Coordinates: 12°56′01″N 79°20′28.9″E
- Country: India
- State: Tamil Nadu
- Established: 28 November 2019
- Headquarters: Ranipet
- Taluks: Walajapet; Arcot; Arakkonam; Nemili; Sholinghur; Kalavai

Government
  - Type: District Administration
  - Body: Ranipet District Collectorate
  - District Collector: N.Priya Ravichandran, IAS
  - Superintendent of Police: P.Sibin, IPS

Area
  - Total: 2,234 km^{2} (863 sq mi)

Population (2011)
  - Total: 1,210,277
  - Density: 541.8/km^{2} (1,403/sq mi)

Languages
  - Official: Tamil
- Time zone: UTC+5:30 (IST)
- GDP (2022-23): ₹27,522.67 crore (US$3.5 billion)
- GDP Per capita (2022-23): ₹213,728 (US$2,719.03)
- Website: https://ranipet.nic.in

Ranipet district is one of the 38 districts of Tamil Nadu, India, formed by trifurcating Vellore district. The Government of Tamil Nadu announced its proposal on 15 August 2019, together with Tirupattur district, and it was officially declared on 28 November 2019 by Tamil Nadu Government.. The Town of Ranipet is the district headquarters. It is located on the Northern Bank of Palar River. It is a Tri-City with adjacent Municipalities of Walajapet, Arcot and Melvisharam.

== Geography ==
The District shares Borders with Districts of Vellore on the West, Kanchipuram on the East, Tiruvannamalai on the South and Thiruvallur on the Northeast. The River Palar Passes in the District. Ponnai River forms the West boundary between Ranipet and Vellore District. And For few kilometres The River Cheyyar forms the Southeast boundary between Ranipet and Tiruvannamalai district.

== Divisions ==
=== Revenue Divisions and Taluks ===
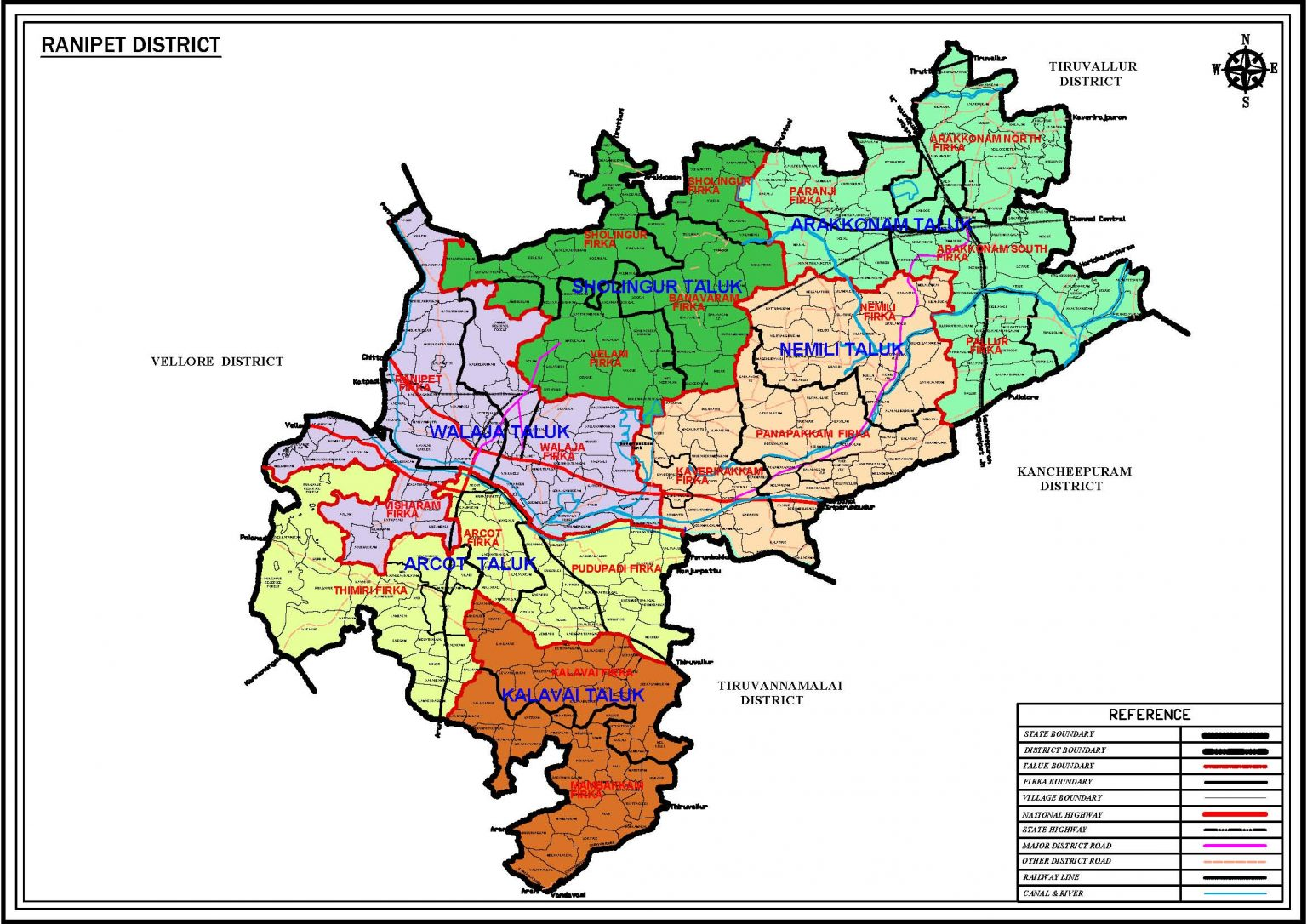

Ranipet Revenue Division: Kalavai Taluk, Arcot Taluk, Walajapet Taluk, Sholinghur Taluk

Arakkonam Revenue Division: Nemili Taluk, Arakkonam Taluk

=== Municipalities ===
1. Ranipet
2. Arakkonam
3. Arcot
4. Walajapet
5. Melvisharam
6. Sholinghur

=== Town Panchayats ===
1. Timiri
2. Kaveripakkam
3. Kalavai
4. Nemili
5. Thakkolam
6. Panapakkam
7. Vilapakkam
8. Ammoor

=== Panchayat Unions / Blocks ===
1. Timiri
2. Arcot
3. Walajapet
4. Sholingur
5. Kaveripakkam
6. Nemili
7. Arakkonam

== Demographics ==
At the time of the 2011 census, Ranipet district had a population of 1,210,277. Ranipet district has a sex ratio of 1007 females per 1000 males. 39.97% of the population lives in urban areas. Scheduled Castes and Scheduled Tribes make up 23.63% and 0.9% of the population, respectively.

Religions in Ranipet district (2011)
Religion	Percent
Hinduism	90.01%
Islam	7.25%
Christianity	2.48%
Other or not stated	0.26%

Hindus are the majority community in the district, with 90% population share. Muslims are around 7% while Christians are 2% of the population. The majority of Muslims and Christians live in the urban areas of the district.

Languages of Ranipet district (2011)
1. Tamil (86.0%)
2. Telugu (6.75%)
3. Urdu (6.01%)
4. Others (1.29%)

Tamil is the majority language, spoken by 85.95% of the population. Telugu is spoken by 6.75%, while Urdu is spoken by 6.01%.

== Economy ==
Some of the SIDCO and SIPCOT industrial parks are located in Ranipet and vital to its economy. Clusters of leather factories are also located in Ranipet.

=== SIPCOT ===
The State Industries Promotion Corporation of Tamil Nadu Limited (SIPCOT), was formed in 1971 to promote industrial growth in the state and to advance term loans to medium and large industries. The SIPCOT Industrial Complex, Ranipet Phase I, is located at Mukundarayapuram. Phase II and Phase III are spread over an area of 730 acres and are located in Ranipet.

There are a number of large- and medium-scale leather industries making both finished leather and leather articles such as shoes and garments for export. There are other small-scale industries in Ranipet, mostly engaged in chemical, leather and tool making. These industries are the major lifeline for the town.

One of the oldest companies in Ranipet that was formed in the early 19th century is EID Parry, named after Thomas Parry, who sailed to India and started a merchant business in India. The branch of EID Parry located in Ranipet is one of the largest ceramic plants in South India. In addition to Ceramics, the company also produces fertilizers in this location sold to farmers around the country. EID Parry also produces confectioneries in other locations.

After the acquisition of the company Johnson & Pedder, EID Parry produced Ballerina ceramic designs in India. Most residents, several decades ago, worked for EID Parry before the expansion of Sipcot Industrial complex and arrival of Central Government-aided engineering unit such as BHEL.

World's first diesel tractor manufacturing Italian company SAME DEUTZ-FAHR India (P) limited (SDFI) located at Sipcot industrial complex. They manufacture tractors and engines for export and domestic market, ranging from 35 hp to 80 hp tractor with advanced technology.

The French company Plastic Omnium and world No.1 fuel systems manufacturer established a factory in 2010 for the purpose of delivering fuel tank systems to local automobile manufacturers such as Toyota and Hyundai.

Thirumalai Chemicals Ltd. a large Petrochemical unit is one of the largest manufacturers of Phthalic Anhydride and Food Acidulants in Asia, and employs around 2000 people in and around Ranipet.

=== Precision tool industries ===
- Mitsubishi Heavy Industries India Precision Tools Limited (MHI-IPT), a subsidiary of Mitsubishi Heavy Industries, opened its plant in Ranipet in 2007, doubling its production capacity in gear cutting tools. Products manufactured by MHI-IPT at this plant are Hobs, Shaping cutters, Gear Shaving cutters, Master Gears, Broaches and Rotary cutter.
- TVS-Brakes India Sholingur's foundry division is located at Sholingur to manufacture Permanent Mold Grey Iron castings with an installed capacity of 5,000 MTPA which later increased to 26,000 MTPA in the year 2005.

Arcot is the principal market for the surrounding agricultural area. It also has a viable local weaving industry, and groundnut oil industry. Arcot is most famous for edible oil production, mainly focusing on groundnut and gingelly oil production. A number of oil expellers are available in and around Arcot. Certain caste of people are more dominant and involved in this edible oil business.

Walajapet was used for business purpose and one of the biggest trade centres during the time of British rule. Walajapet is one of the oldest town in the North Arcot Region. It is famous for silk weaving and has a nickname, "Walajapet -The Silk City". It is situated in the belt of the Ranipet SIPCOT Industrial Complex as a public limited company wholly owned by the Government.

Walajapet is one of the noted centre for the production of silk weaving and bamboo furniture making centre. The commercial activities is concentrated at Thoppai street, Annaicut Road, Bazaar street, Thirumalai Street. There is a daily market available in this town.

=== Leathers Industries ===
Ranipet was once glorified as fast developing industrial zone, but faced economic depression. Ranipet indirectly suffered from Great Recession 2008 as leather business and exports cater to Western Developed nations. A special economic zone is established at Nellikuppam, a suburb of Ranipet.

Ranipet houses AH Group And KH Group of companies. Nearly 400 small and medium leather units are placed in Ranipet.

=== Engineering & manufacturing industries ===
Bharat Heavy Electricals Limited (BHEL), is an Indian state-owned integrated power plant equipment manufacturing company. Its Boiler Auxiliaries Plant (BAP) is located in Ranipet. BHEL Ranipet has performed exceedingly well according to its executive director, as it has won the 'Best Productive Unit' trophy from among all the units of BHEL in 2012. This plant has clocked a turnover of 4,210 crores, with shop production crossing the 100,000-tonne benchmark, also registering a profit before tax of 1,260 crores for the 2012 financial year. It has so far obtained 21 patents and 46 copyrights.

BHEL-Boiler Auxiliaries Plant, Ranipet is installing a 5 MW solar power plant which will cover the entire energy needs of the plant, also entering into an agreement with Mitsubishi Heavy Industries, Japan to manufacture and supply a flue gas desulphurisation system meant for removal of sulphur dioxide from flue gases.

ArcelorMittal Dhamm Processing Private Limited is a joint venture firm between the world's largest steel producing firm ArcelorMittal and Mumbai based Dhamm Steel for manufacturing steel components at an estimated cost of 100-crores at Ranipet. It manufactures finished steel components for earth moving equipment manufacturers, construction and power industries.

MRF Limited (formerly Madras Rubber Factory Ltd) is an India-based company engaged in manufacturing, distribution and sale of tires for various kinds of vehicles ranging from helicopters to automobiles is located at Arakkonam.

== Urban infrastructure ==
Arakkonam Junction railway station is the largest railway junction in Ranipet district. It is located at the intersection of the Chennai–Bangalore line and the Guntakal–Chennai line, which is part of Mumbai–Chennai line. Arakkonam has one of the biggest workshop for Southern Railway, known as the "Engineering Workshop" (EWS) which has many employees serving the Indian Railways in various process related with fabrication and processing of various metal components for the railways. Most of the machines in these workshops are a century old and some of them are working. It also has an electric locomotive shed, known as the "Electric Loco Shed" (ELS). WAG-5 and WAP-4 locomotives are maintained here. Suburban electric train facility is also available towards Chennai.

The second-biggest Food Corporation of India (FCI) godown is located at Arakkonam. It is used to store all types of food grains for a long periods. Transport is also available by road to all major cities and towns.

The runway at the INS Rajali, a naval air force of the Indian Navy in Arakkonam is 4,500 metres in length, making it the second-longest air force runway in the Indian Subcontinent. It is also Asia's second-biggest Naval Training Centre.

Many official buildings in Arakkonam were built during the British era. An underpass beneath the railway connects Arakkonam and Kanchipuram and is one of the city's oldest structures. It was built with lime mortar and stones.

== Politics ==
District	No.	Constituency	Name	Party	Alliance	Remarks
Ranipet	38	Arakkonam (SC)	V. Gandhiraj	TVK	SSJVA	Cabinet Minister
Ranipet	39	Sholinghur	G. Kapil	TVK	SSJVA	
Ranipet	41	Ranipet	I. Thahira	TVK	SSJVA	
Ranipet	42	Arcot	S. M. Sukumar	AIADMK	NDA	Supported TVK; Later declared support for EPS

== See also ==
- List of districts of Tamil Nadu
