= Vellore Fort =

16th-century fort in India

- Vellore
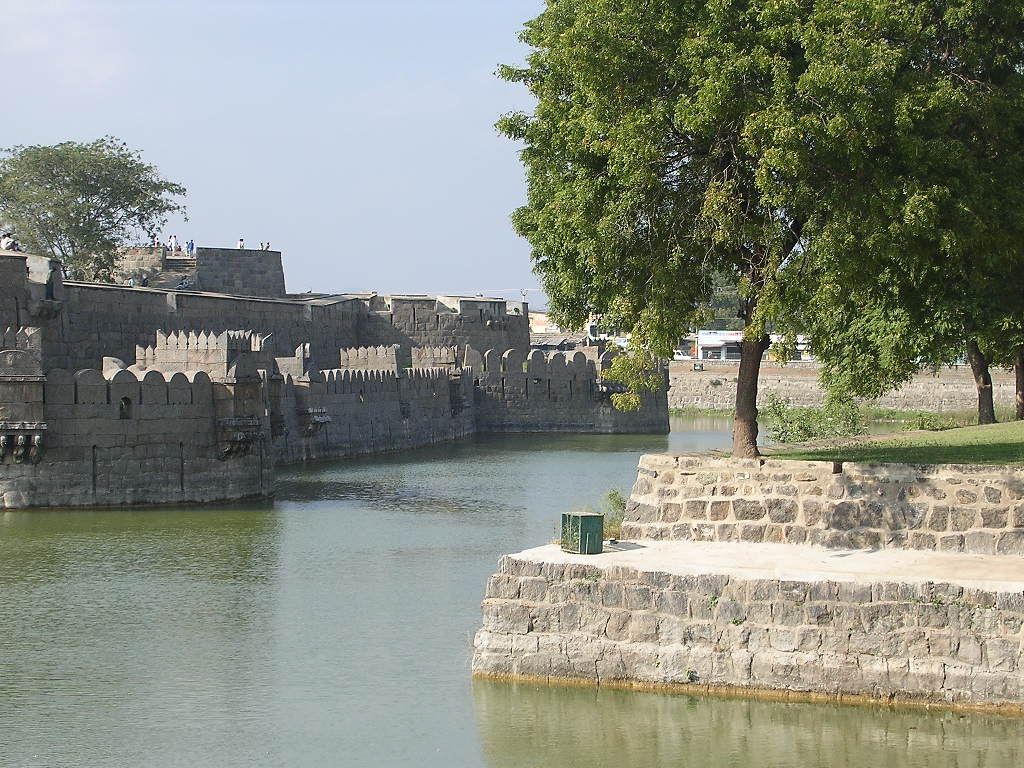
- Vellore Kottai

Site information
- Type: Fort and Temple Complex
- Owner: Archaeological Survey of India
- Controlled by: Archaeological Survey of India
- Open to the public: Yes
- Condition: Preserved as Historic Monument

Location
- Location within Tamil Nadu
- Coordinates: 12°55′15″N 79°07′42″E
- Height: n/a

Site history
- Built: 1566; 460 years ago
- Built by: Vijayanagara Empire
- In use: Till date
- Materials: Granite
- Battles/wars: Battle of Thoppur, Carnatic Wars,
- Events: Vellore Mutiny

Garrison information
- Occupants: Vijayanagara Empire, Nawabs of Arcot, Maratha Empire, British India

Vellore Fort - Night View

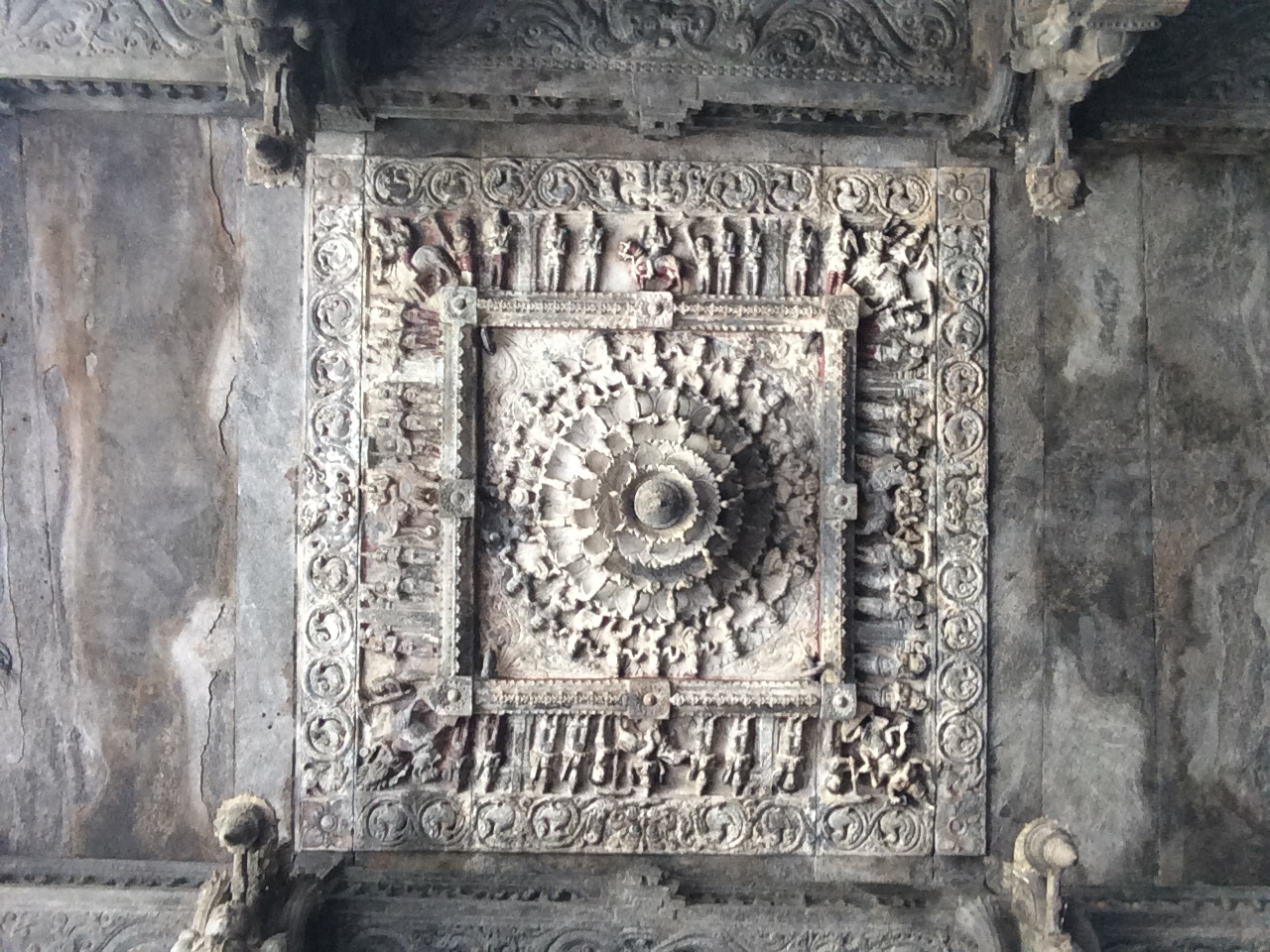
Stone carving of the ceiling with intricate details

Vellore Fort is a large 16th-century fort situated in heart of the Vellore city, in the state of Tamil Nadu, India built by Chinna bommi reddy and Timma reddy ,nayakas( feudal lords) under Vijayanagar empire. The fort was at one time the imperial capital of the Aravidu Dynasty of the Vijayanagara Empire. The fort is known for its grand ramparts, wide moat and robust masonry.

The fort's ownership passed from Emperors of Vijayanagara, to the Bijapur sultans, to the Marathas, to the Carnatic Nawabs and finally to the British, who held the fort until India gained independence. The Indian government maintains the fort with the Archaeological Department. During British rule, the Tipu Sultan's family and the last King of Sri Lanka, Sri Vikrama Rajasinha were held as prisoners in the fort. It is also a witness to the massacre of the Vijayanagara royal family of Sriranga Raya. The fort houses the Jalakanteswarar Hindu temple, the Christian St. John's Church and a Muslim mosque, of which the Jalakanteswarar Temple is famous for its magnificent carvings. The first significant military rebellion against British rule, the Vellore Mutiny, erupted at this fort in 1806.

Vellore Fort is one of the most popular tourist destinations for both domestic and international visitors to Tamil Nadu.

== History ==
=== Part of Vijayanagara Empire ===
Vellore fort was built by Aravidu Dynasty in the year 1566 CE. The Fort gained strategic prominence following the re-establishment of Vijayanagara rule with Chandragiri as their 4th capital after the Battle of Talikota. The Aravidu Dynasty that held the title of Rayas in 17th century resided in this fort, using it as a base in the battle of Toppur in the 1620s. This major battle took place for the claiming of the Raya title between two factions of the Raya family. Each faction included their respective subordinates: the Nayaks of Tanjore, the Gingee and the Madurai taking sides to suit their interests.

The Rayas also had long-running battles with their longtime rivals, the Turko-Persian Bijapur Sultans, and with their subordinates in the Nayaks of Madurai and the Gingee over non-remittance of annual tributes. In the 1640s, during the reign of Sriranga Raya III, the fort was briefly captured by the Bijapur army, but was eventually recaptured with the help of the Nayaks of Tanjore.

During Emperor Sriranga Raya's reign in 1614 CE, a coup broke out within the royal family and the reigning Emperor Sriranga Raya and his royal family were murdered by the rival factions of the royal family, with the younger son Rama Deva Raya of the emperor smuggled out from the fort by supporting factions of the emperor. These events led to the Battle of Toppur in 1616, one of the largest Southern Indian wars of the century.

In 1639 CE, Francis Day of the East India Company obtained a small strip of land in the Coromandel Coast from the Nayakas of the Vellore-Chandragiri regions to do trading, which is in present-day Chennai.

=== Under Bijapur (1656–1678) ===
In the 1650s, Sriranga allied with the Mysore and Tanjore Nayaks and marched south to attack Gingee and Madurai. His first stop was the capture of Gingee Fort, but Thirumalai Nayak of Madurai responded by requesting the Sultan of Bijapur to attack Vellore from the north to divert Sriranga's attention. The Bijapur sultan promptly dispatched a large army and captured Vellore Fort. Subsequently, both the Madurai-Bijapur armies converged on Gingee, defeating the Vellore-Tanjore forces. After a melee, both the forts ended up in the hands of the sultan of Bijapur. The defeat also marked the end of the last direct line of Vijayanagara emperors. Within 20 years after this incident, the Marathas seized the fort from the Bijapur sultans.

=== Under the Marathas (1678–1707) ===
In 1676, the Mawlas under the Great Maratha King Shivaji marched south to the Tanjore country, which had recently been attacked and captured by Chokkanatha Nayak of Madurai. That same year, Ekoji, the brother of Chh Shivaji Maharaj took control of Tanjore, but was under threat from his immediate neighbours Madurai and Bijapur Sultans, based in Gingee and Vellore respectively. Shivaji Maharaj’s army first captured the Gingee Fort in 1677, but left the task of attacking Vellore to his assistant and rushed to Deccan as his territories were being attacked by Mughal Emperor Aurangazeb. In 1678, after a prolonged fourteen-month siege, the fort passed on to the Marathas. Shivaji's representative strengthened the fort's fortifications and ruled the area in relative peace.

=== Under the Mughals (1707–1760) ===
In 1707, the year that Aurangazeb died, the Delhi Army under Daud Khan captured Vellore Fort after defeating the Marathas. The struggle for the Delhi throne empowered the Deccan Muslim governors to declare independence. In 1710 the recently established Nawab of Arcot under Sadat Ullah Khan followed suit. Dost Ali, the latter's successor in 1733, gifted the fort to one of his sons-in-law.

=== Under control of the British (1799–1947) ===
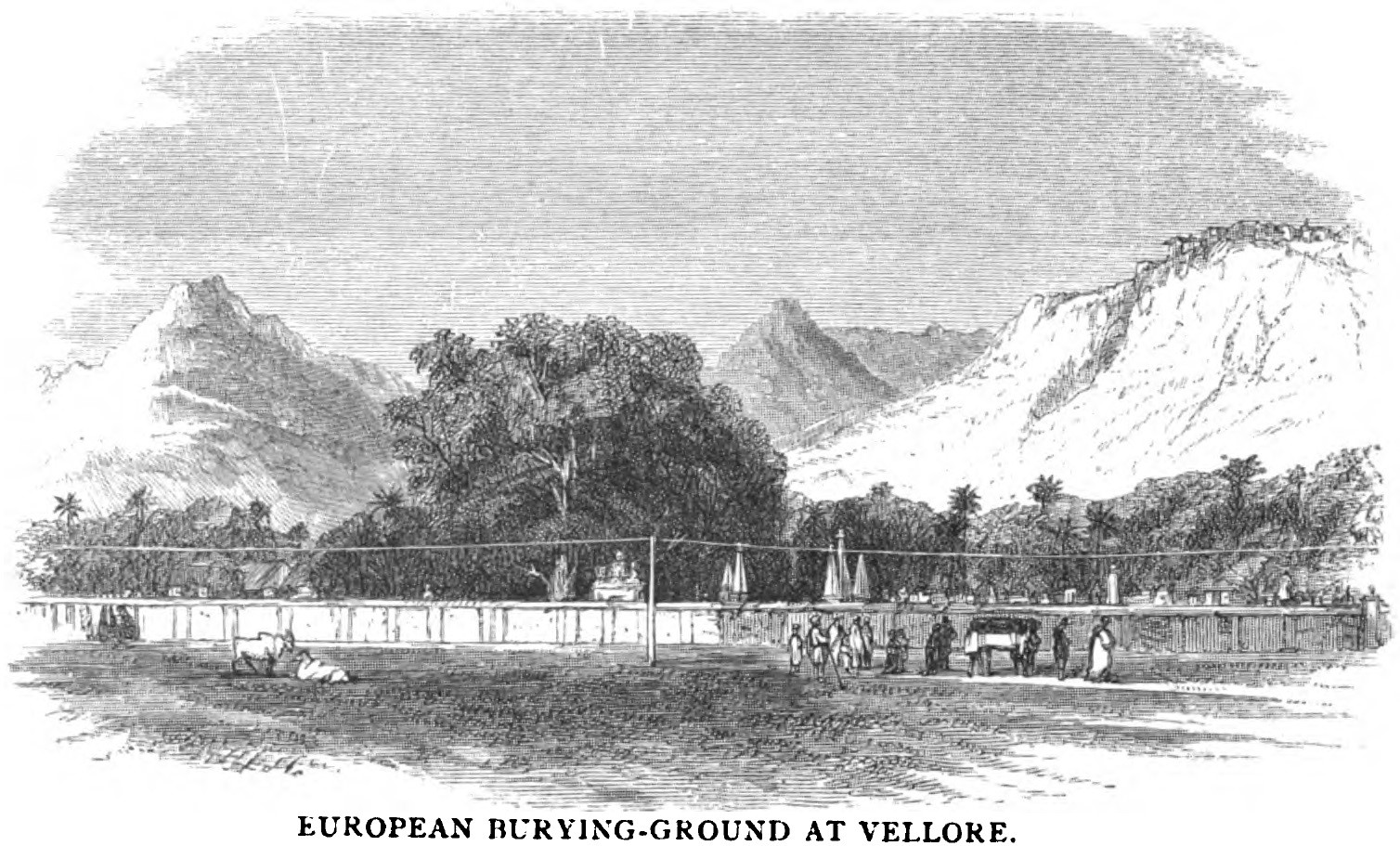
European Burying-Ground at Vellore (MacLeod, p.142, 1871)

Following the decline of Madurai Nayaks, and coinciding with the emergence of the British on the Madras coast, conflict developed between the Nawab and his sons-in-law. The Nawab was supported by the British and the rival claimants by the French; resulting in the Carnatic Wars. The British took possession of Vellore Fort with relative ease and used the fort as a major garrison until Indian independence.

In 1780, the fort was besieged by Hyder Ali during the Second Anglo-Mysore War, but the British garrison held out for over two years before the siege was lifted.

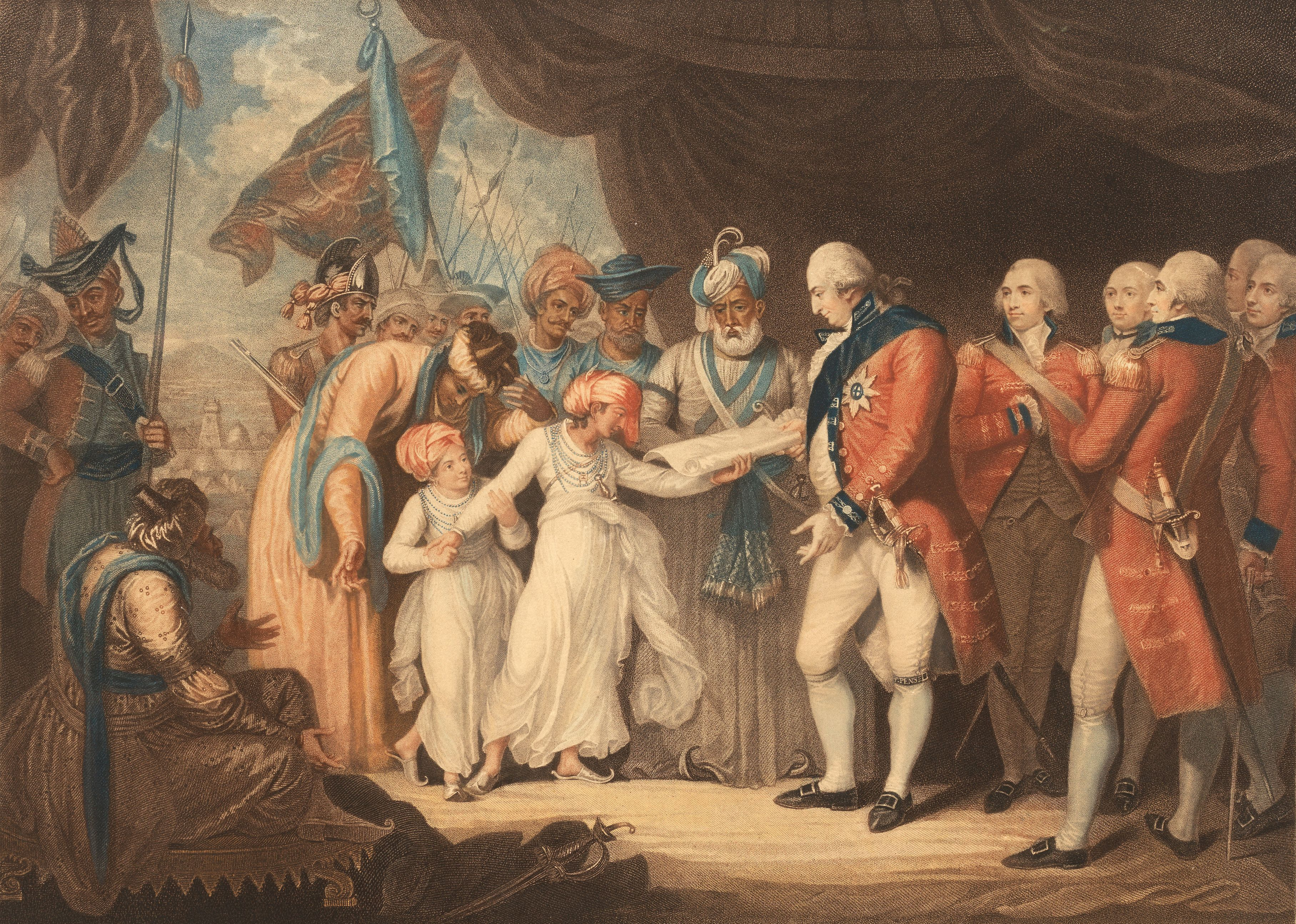
General Lord Cornwallis receiving Tipu Sultan's sons as hostages in 1792, both of whom were kept captive in Vellore.

==== Vellore Mutiny (1806) ====
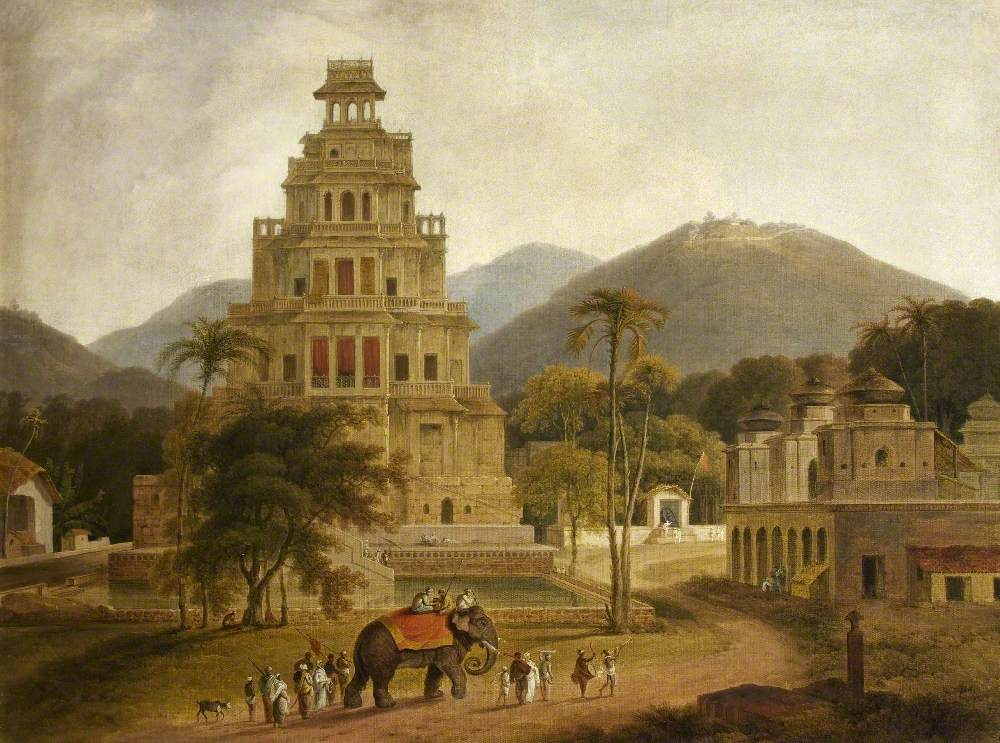
Thomas Daniell (1749-1840) The Fort of Vellore in the Carnatic, India

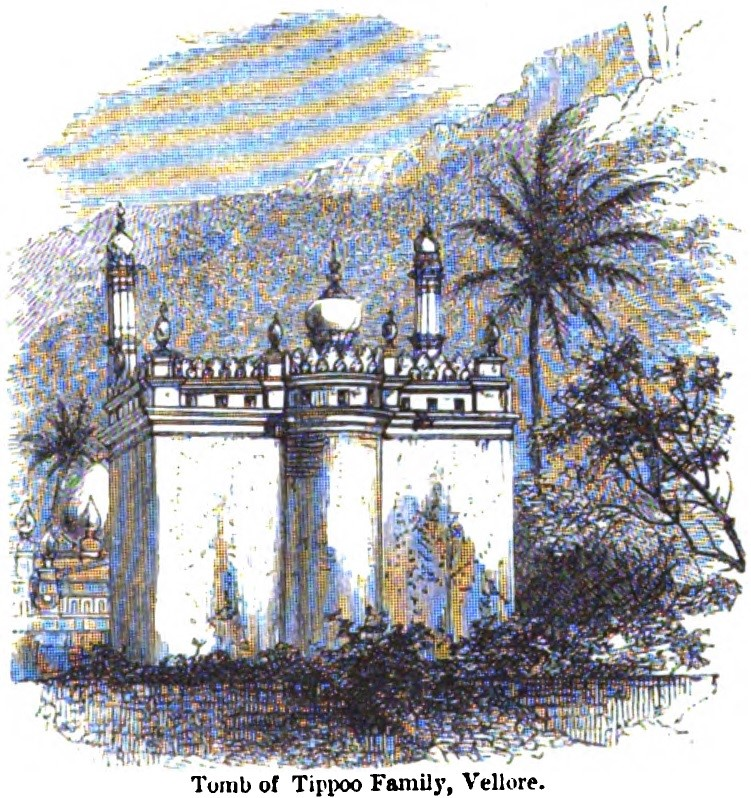
Tomb of Tippoo family, Vellore (MacLeod, p.141, 1871)

The fort was the scene of the Vellore Sepoy Mutiny, popularly called the Vellore Mutiny. In 1806 Vellore Fort was used by the British to station two infantry regiments of the Madras Army plus four companies of a British regiment. The commander-in-chief of the Madras Army had prescribed a new round hat for the Madras sepoys to replace their turbans, plus ordering the removal of beards, caste markings and jewelry. These measures were intended merely to improve the appearance of the Madras soldiers on parade but the sepoys considered them to be an offensive meddling with their religious beliefs. The situation was worsened by the fact that the hat included a leather cockade, made from cow hide.

On 10 July 1806, before sunrise, the Indian sepoys stationed in the fort attacked the European barracks there, and by late morning had killed about 15 officers and 100 soldiers of the British regiment and ransacked their houses. Some of the rebelling soldiers also urged the sons of Tipu Sultan to lead them. The news quickly reached the colonel commanding the cavalry cantonment in Arcot, who reached the fort within nine hours with several squadrons of British and Indian cavalry, accompanied by horse-artillery. The mutineers, numbering more than 800, were scattered with heavy losses. By noon the mutiny was put down. The events lead to a court of inquiry by the British, who decided to shift the Tipu Sultan's family from Vellore to faraway Calcutta, in isolation.

The news of the Vellore Rebellion sent shockwaves throughout the British government. The governor, Lord William Bentinck, and Commander-in-Chief of the Madras Army, Sir John Cradock both were recalled on this count. The Vellore Mutiny was the first significant military rebellion experienced in India by the British, although it has been largely overshadowed by the Bengal mutiny of 1857.

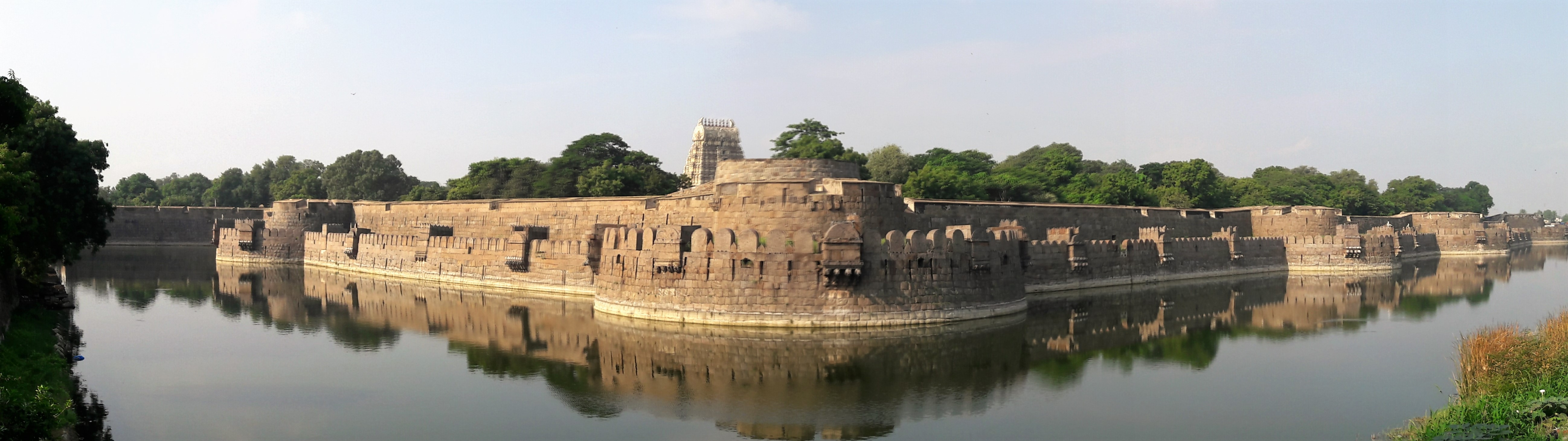
Vellore Fort and Jalakandeswarar temple Panorama

== Architecture ==
It is mentioned that "there is no such fort on the face of earth like the one in Vellore. It had a deep wet ditch (moat) where once 10,000 crocodiles swarmed, waiting to grab every intruder into this impregnable fort. It has huge double walls with bastions projecting irregularly, where two carts can be driven abreast". The fort was constructed in granite from the nearby quarries in Arcot and Chittoor districts. It spreads over an area of 133 acres (0.54 km^{2}) and is located at an altitude of 220 m (720 ft) within a broken mountain range. The fort is surrounded by a moat which was once used as an additional line of defence in the case of an invasion. It was supposed to have included an escape tunnel leading to Virinjipuram about 12 km (7.5 mi) away, which could be used by the king and other royals in the event of an attack. This report was however later disputed by researchers of the ASI who found no evidence of the existence of such a passage. The fort is considered to be amongst the best examples of military architecture in Southern India and is known for its grand ramparts, wide moat and robust masonry.

The fort houses a temple, a mosque, a church and many other buildings that are now used as public offices including Tamil Nadu's oldest police training centre. The Jalagandeeswarar Temple, dedicated to Jalagandeeswar,(the original name of the deity was "Jwarakandeeswarar") is noted for its sculptures, and speaks volumes of the exquisite craftsmanship of the highly skilled artisans of that period. The sculpture in the porch on the left of the entrance is a masterpiece appreciated by the connoisseurs of art and architecture. The temple was long used as an arsenal, and remained without a deity, although several years ago it was sanctified with an idol of Lord Shiva.

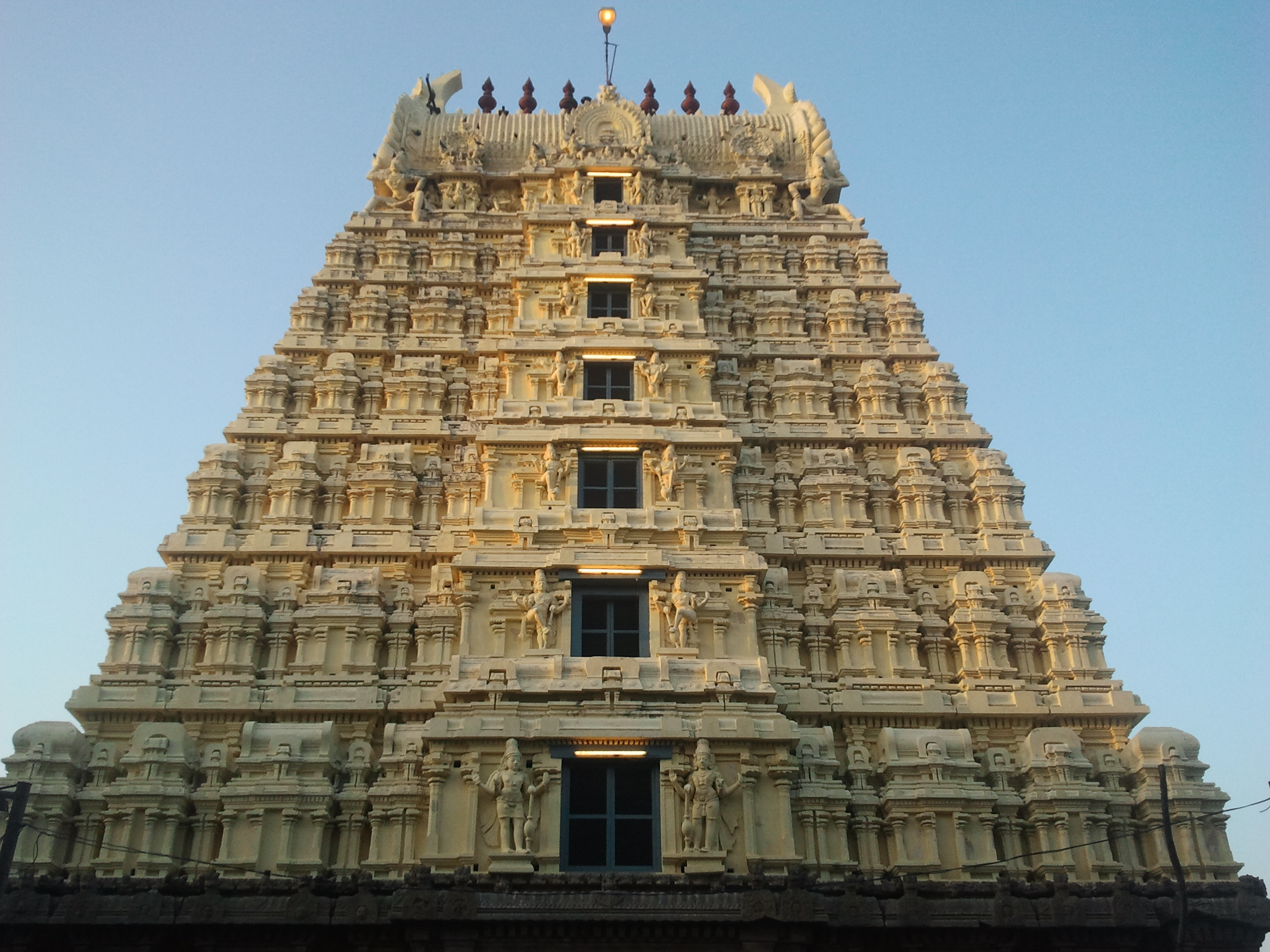
Sri Jalagandeeswarar Temple, Feb 2012

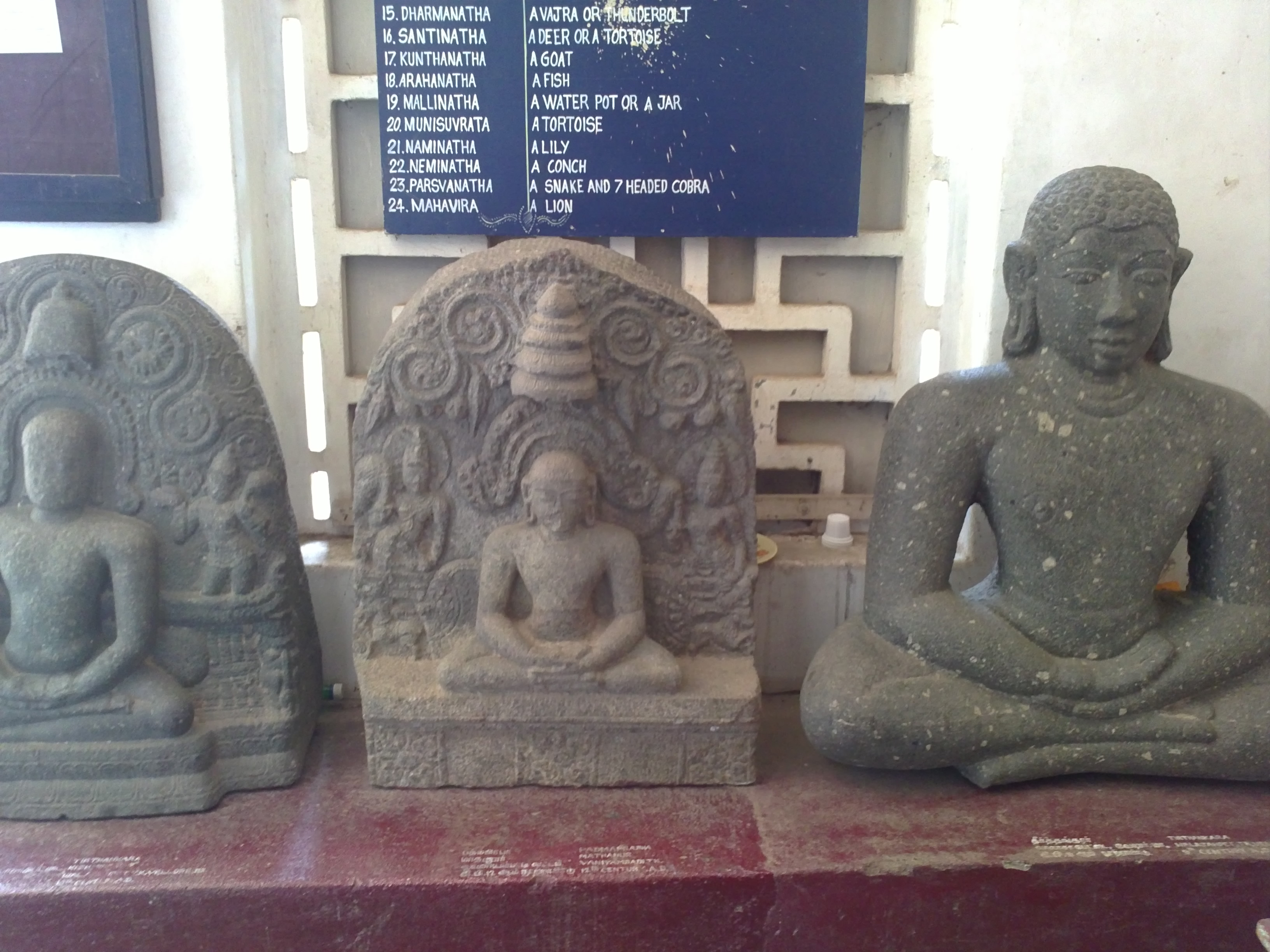
Statues in Vellore Fort gallery

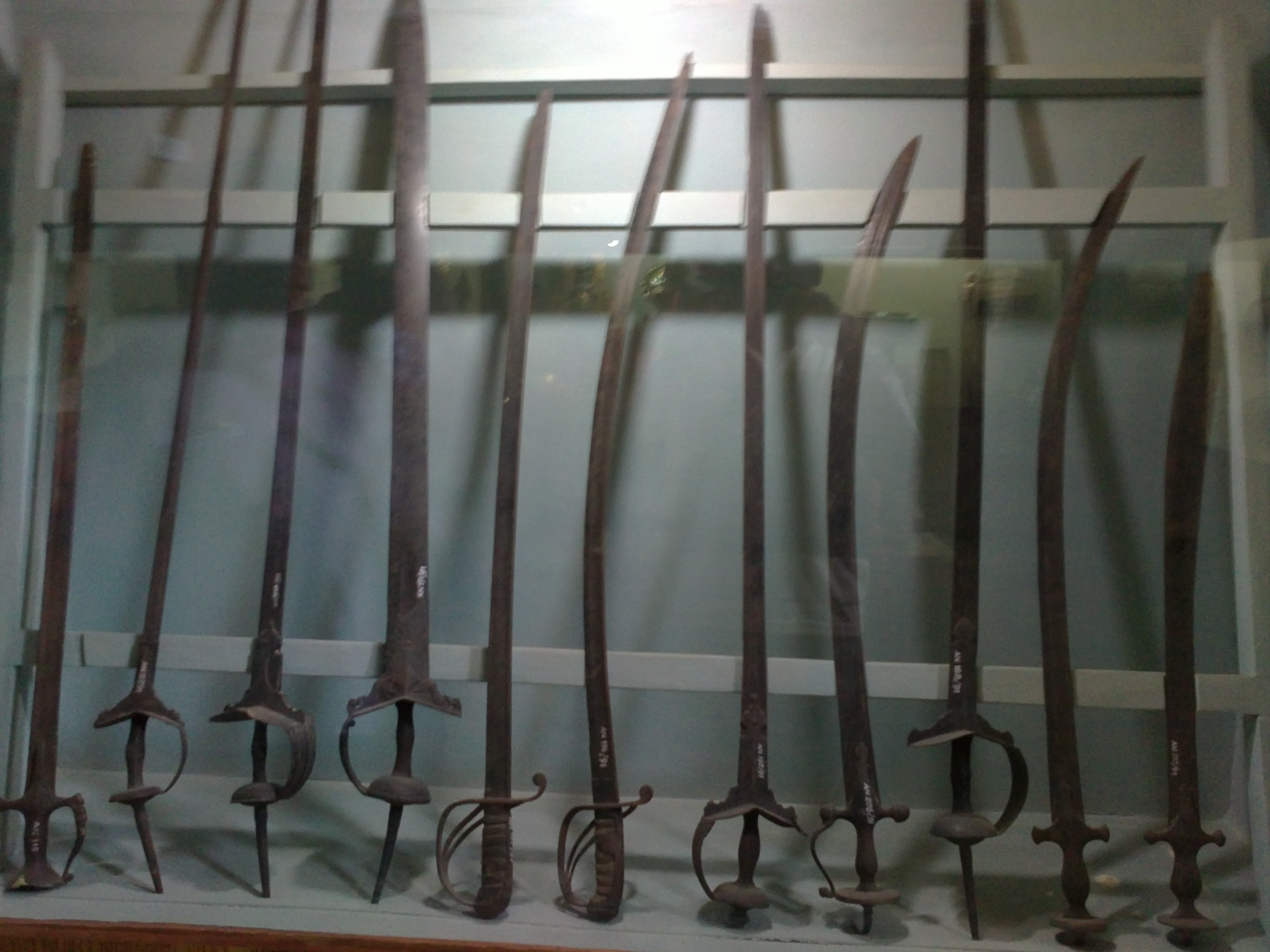
Swords

The mosque inside the fort was constructed during the last Arcot Nawab's period. Presently, Muslims are not allowed to pray inside the fort mosque despite protest by several thousand people living in Vellore. Vellore's inhabitants believe that the Archaeological Survey of India (ASI) is being discriminatory by excluding Muslims from the mosque while Hindus and Christians are not stopped from entering temple and church respectively. However, some refute the claims of the Muslims, as in the late 1980s, Muslims including the late Abdul Samad had given a commitment that the Muslims did not want to worship inside the fort structure, in support of re-opening of the Jalagandeeswarar Temple. The local jamaath leadership was also against this move, and blamed fringe political organisations of whipping up communal dis-harmony. The church inside the fort was constructed during the early British period (Robert Clive, East Indian Company). Muthu Mandapam is a memorial built around the tombstone of Sri Vikrama Rajasinha, the last ruler of Sri Lanka.

== St. John's Church, Vellore Fort ==
St. John's Church, Vellore located inside the Vellore Fort was raised in 1846 by the Government of Madras for the officers and men of the East India Company military station. The church is named after St. John the Evangelist. However, the church was never officially consecrated and hence not officially named as St. John's Church. St. John's Church is the oldest standing church in the Vellore Diocese.

== Royal prisoners ==
Vellore Fort has housed several royal captives over its history. After the fall of Srirangapatnam in 1799 and the death of Tipu Sultan, his family, including his sons, daughters, wife and mother (who was the wife of Hyder Ali), was detained in the fort. After the 1806 Sepoy Mutiny, the British transferred Tipu's sons and daughters to Calcutta. The tombs of Bakshi Begum (died 1806), widow of Hyder Ali and Padshah Begum, Tipu's wife & sons, who died in 1834 are located within a kilometer of the eastern side of the fort.

Vellore Fort also became the final destination for the last ruling monarch of Sri Lanka, Sri Vikrama Rajasinha (1798–1815). The king and his family were kept as prisoners of war at this fort for 17 years with his family. His grave can be found in the fort along with the last Raya kings of Vijayanagara Empire.

== Culture ==
The fort is situated in the centre of Vellore town opposite to the Old Bus stand. Vellore is on the Chennai-Bangalore highway and is 120 km (75 mi) from Chennai and 210 km (130 mi) from Bangalore. The nearest rail station is Vellore-Katpadi Junction, where all super fast trains stop. The nearest airports are Vellore Airport, Tirupati Airport, Chennai International Airport and Bengaluru International Airport. In 1981 the Post and Telegraph Department of India released a stamp commemorating the fort, and in July 2006 a stamp marking the 200th anniversary of the Mutiny was released by the Tamil Nadu Chief Minister. This 16th-century fort was opened up to tourists and is now maintained by the Archaeological Survey of India. Government Museum is a multi-purpose museum maintained by the Department of Museum Government of Tamil Nadu. Its treasures include ancient- and present-day curiosities relating to subjects such as anthropology, botany, geology, numismatics, pre-history, and zoology. Historical monuments of the erstwhile composite North Arcot district are gracefully depicted in the gallery. This museum is kept open on all days between 9.00 a.m. and 12.30 p.m. and 2.00 pm and 5.00 pm except on holidays, and admission fee is only INR 5/-.

== Gallery ==
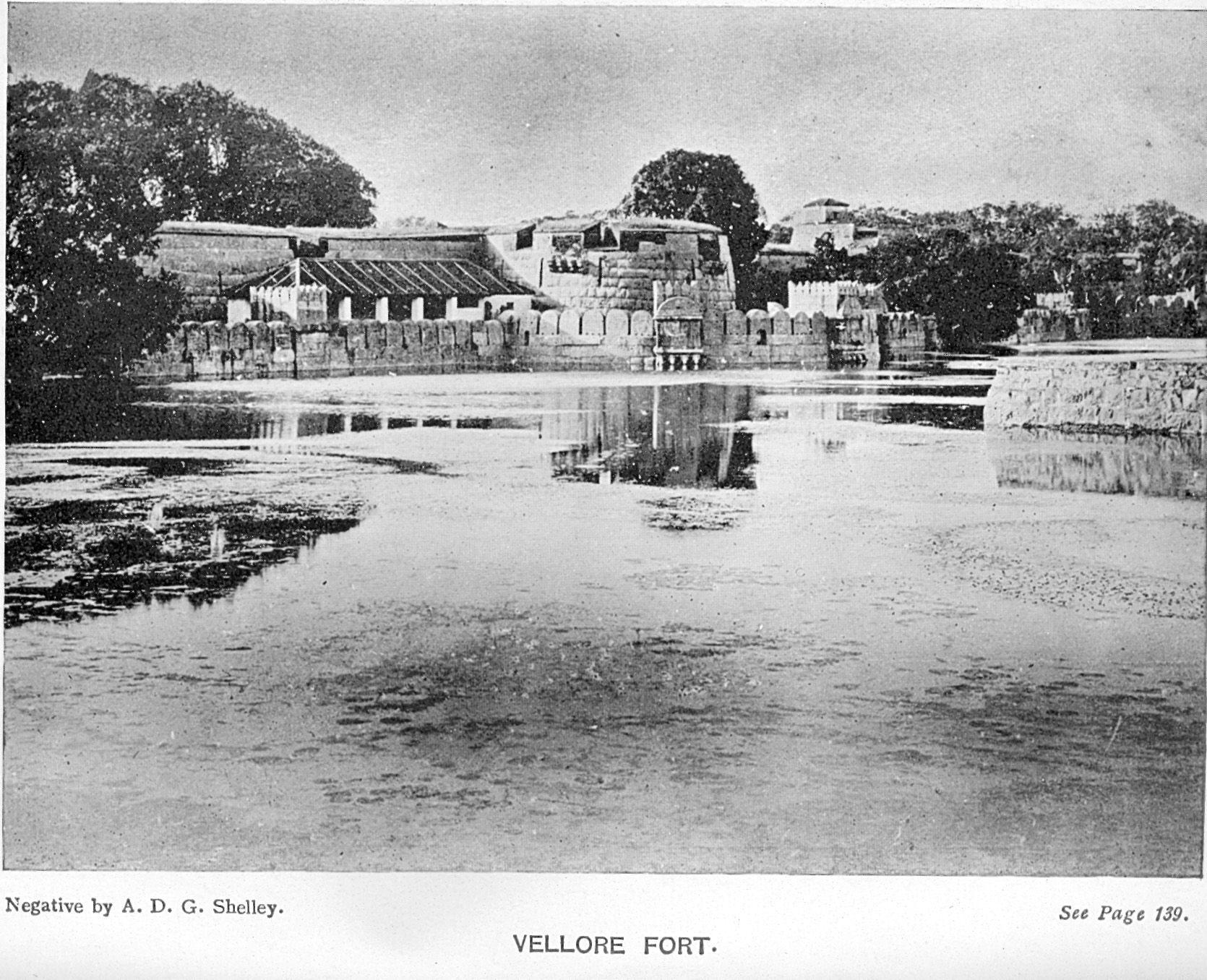
Vellore Fort in 1913

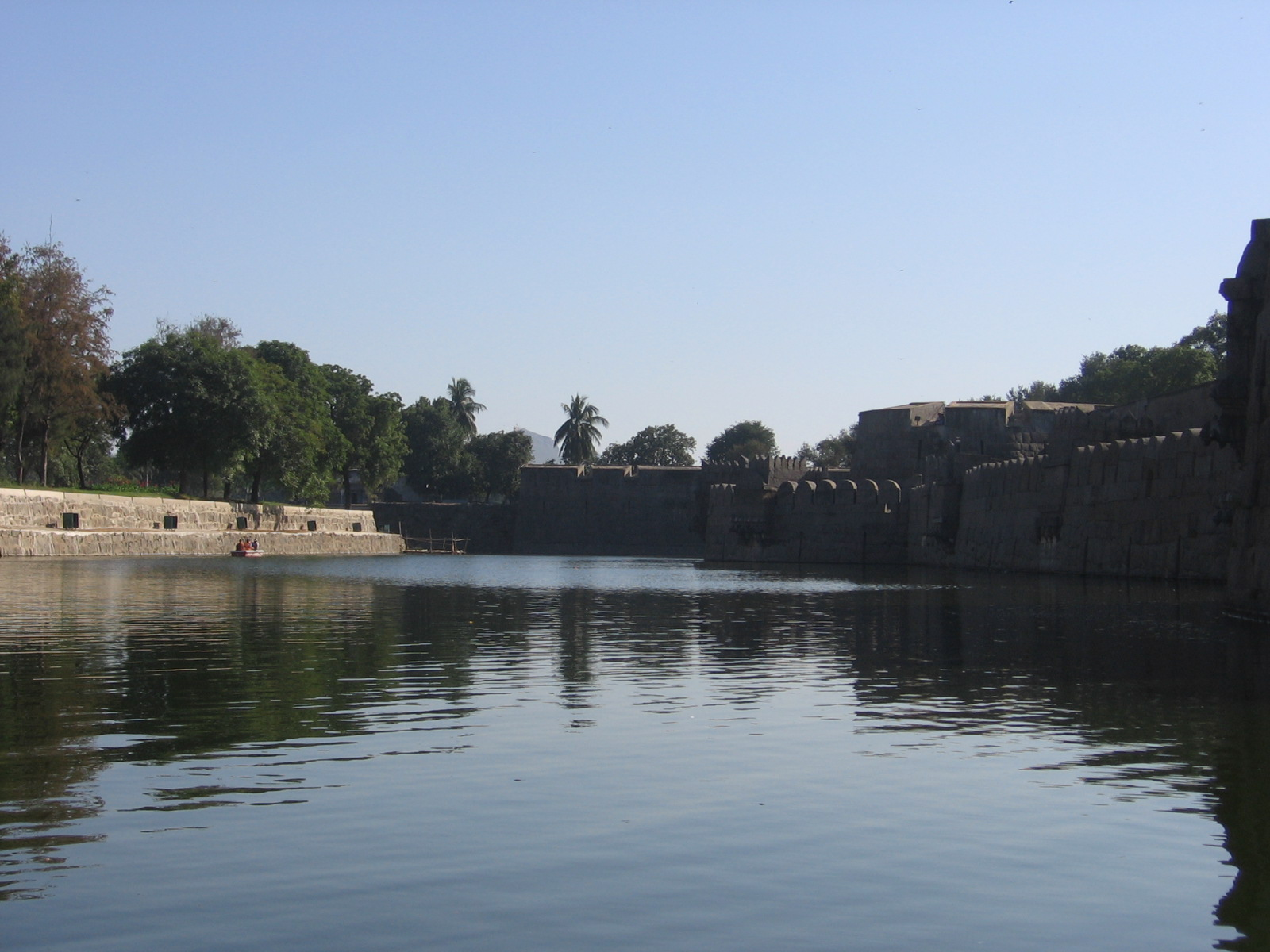
Vellore Fort moat

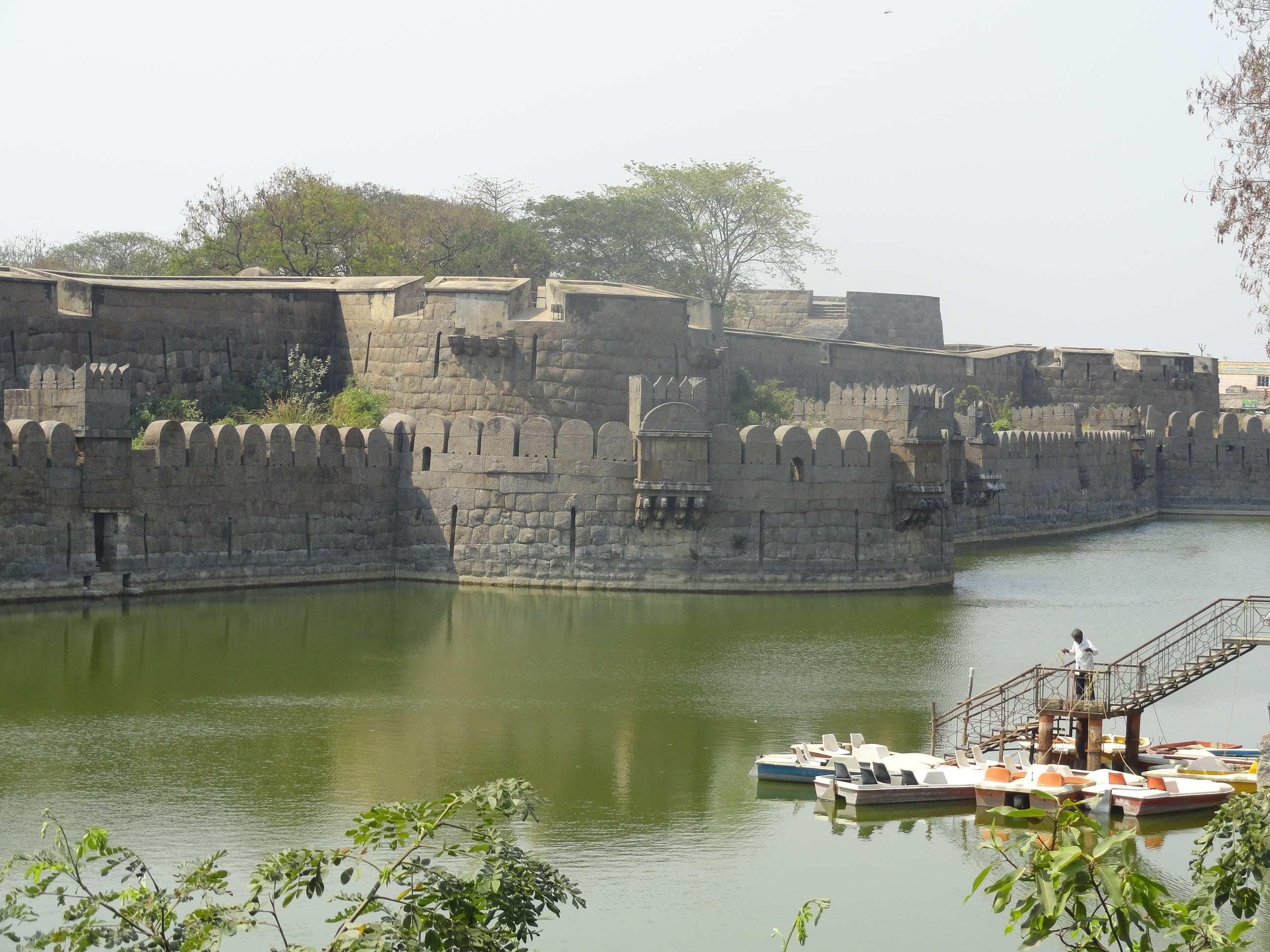
View of moat at Vellore Fort

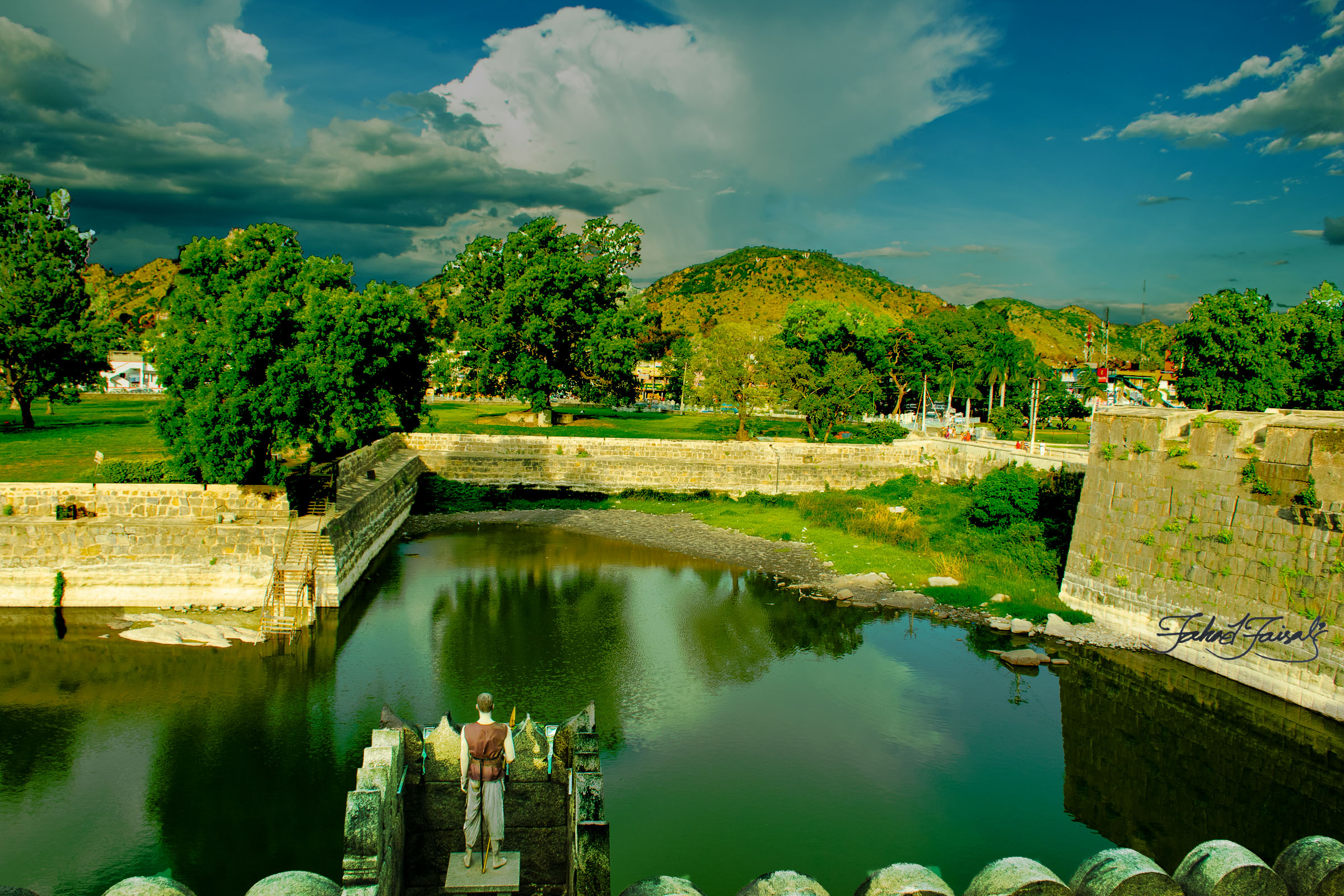
View from the Vellore Fort

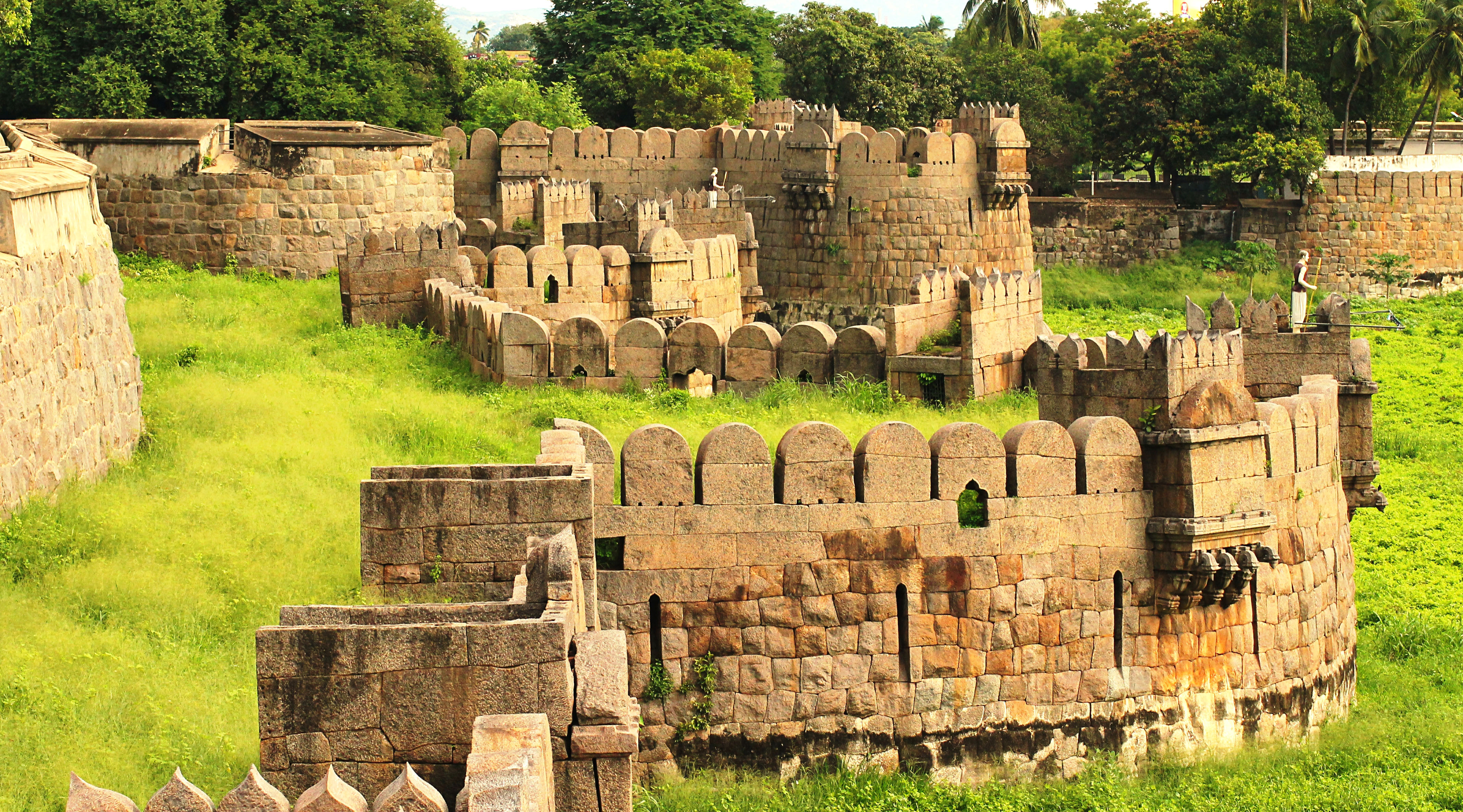

== See also ==
- Jalakandeswarar Temple, Vellore
- St. John's Church, Vellore
- Sajra and Gojra Forts, Vellore

== Bibliography ==
- Rao, Velcheru Narayana, and David Shulman, Sanjay Subrahmanyam. Symbols of substance: court and state in Nayaka period Tamil Nadu (Delhi; Oxford: Oxford University Press, 1998); xix, 349 p., [16] p. of plates : ill., maps; 22 cm (8.7 in); Oxford India paperbacks; Includes bibliographical references and index; ISBN 0-19-564399-2.
- Sathianathaier, R. History of the Nayaks of Madura [microform] by R. Sathyanatha Aiyar; edited for the university, with introduction and notes by S. Krishnaswami Aiyangar (Madras: Oxford University Press, 1924); see also (London: H. Milford, Oxford University Press, 1924); xvi, 403 p.; 21 cm.; SAMP early 20th-century Indian books project item 10819.
- Vriddhagirisan. V. Nayaks of Tanjore, ISBN 8120609964, Reprint Annamalainagar 1942 edn. 1995
- Alladi Jagannatha Sashtri, B.A. & L.T.: A Family History Of Venkatagiri Rajas (Madras : Addison Press, 1922, General Books LLC, 2010) ISBN 9781152543713
- C. S. Srinivasachari, M. A., Professor of History, Annamalai University, History Of Gingee And Its Rulers (The university, 1943), ASIN: B0007JBT3G
