= Vellore Diocese =

Diocese of Vellore may refer to:

- Diocese of Vellore of the Church of South India
- Roman Catholic Diocese of Vellore
