= St. John's Church, Vellore =

Church in Vellore Fort

St. John’s Church
- Vellore Fort Church
- Vellore Fort Church
- St. John’s Church
- 12°55′12″N 79°07′41″E
- Location: Vellore Fort
- Country: India
- Denomination: Church of South India
- Tradition: Anglican
- Website: https://stjohnschurchvellore.com/

History
- Consecrated: Never officially consecrated

Architecture
- Style: Classical exterior, English Gothic
- Groundbreaking: 1844
- Completed: 1846
- Construction cost: BINR 5559

Administration
- Diocese: Vellore Diocese

St. John’s Church is located inside the Vellore Fort, Tamil Nadu State, India. The Church was raised in 1846 by the Government of Madras for the officers and men of the East India Company military station. The church is called after St. John the Evangelist. However, the church was never officially consecrated and hence not officially named as St. John’s Church. St. John's Church is the oldest standing church in the Vellore Diocese. The church stands inside the Vellore Fort, which is under the control of the Archaeological Survey of India, along with the Vijaynagar period Jalakanteswarar Temple, Tippu Mahal, Hyder Mahal, Candy Mahal, Badhusha Mahal and the Begum Mahal.

== History ==
In Vellore, there existed a Chaplain of the East India Company since 1798 for the European officers. A catechist appointed by the Society for Promoting Christian Knowledge (SPCK) cared for the native converted Christians. Some of the SPCK missionaries serving in Vellore were Gericke (up to 1803), Paexold (till his death in 1817) and Rev. L P Haubroe appointed by Dr. Rottler of Vepery.

=== SPCK Chapel, 1773 ===
In 1769, Gericke, a missionary of the Society for Promoting Christian Knowledge (SPCK) and a pupil of Christian Friedrich Schwarz, commenced Christian missionary work at Vellore. In 1773, Fabricius of Vepery, raised the very first church building at Vellore Fort, to be used as a chapel for Sunday services and to be used as a school for children on other days, and with the condition that the building can also be used by the native congregation. Fabricius contributed 60 pagados from the Vepery Mission Fund, Mr. Pelling, who was the civil representative of the Madras Government at Vellore, contributed 10 pagados. The officers and men of the Company regiment at Vellore Fort contributed rest of the funds required for raising this first chapel at the Vellore Fort. In 1780, during Second Anglo-Mysore War, Vellore Fort fell into the Hands of Hyder Ali, and was restored back to British Rule in 1784. In view of the increased military presence at the Fort, the chapel building was taken up to accommodate men of the 72nd Regiment. In 1787, Schwartz, wrote to the Madras Government, asking them to either buy the building or pay rent. The Government agreed to buy the building for 300 pagados (p. 619-p. 621).

=== Torriano Chapel, 1793 ===
In 1792, William Harcourt Torriano, civil representative of the Madras Government and friend of Schwarz, helped raise a new church building with his own expenses at the Vellore Fort, for the use of both Europeans and the native Indians. This 'large new chapel' was dedicated by Gericke and J P Rottler a missionary from Tranquebar in 1793, and this chapel lasted for 30 years (p. 621-p. 622).

=== Government Church, 1835 ===
The Directors of the East India Company resolved Vellore to be one of the 7 military stations where a permanent chaplain would be appointed. However, as a result of the Vellore Mutiny of 1806, the Company regiment was transferred to Arcot which became the primary military station between 1807 and 1862, and there remained only a small military presence at the Vellore Fort. Military chaplains were now based in Arcot, where the Madras Government built a large church in 1814. The Government decided in view of changed circumstances only a small church be built at lower expense at the Vellore Fort (p. 624-p. 625).

In 1828, the English School building inside the Fort became the new Government Board of Education. By this time the Tarriano's Chapel was dilapidated and deserted, and the divine services were being held at the barracks. In 1826, the SPCK had handed over the Vellore Mission to the Society for the Propagation of the Gospel in Foreign Parts (SPG). In 1830, the SPG allocated 200 pounds for building a proper chapel for use of the congregation. The new church was completed in 1835, and was used by both Europeans and the natives (p. 626).

=== Plans for New Church at Vellore Fort ===
In 1837, Rev W Tomes, Chaplain of the Company recommended that the old Tarriano's Chapel be repaired (re-roofed) for use of the European congregation, and the estimate was Rs. 510. However the engineer's report was critical of the walls of the structure and recommended a new building be built outside the Vellore Fort. This report was accepted by the Government, and a site outside the Fort was purchased, and the foundations were raised. However, at this point, objections were raised on the location of the new site on military grounds, and had to be abandoned (p. 626-p. 627).

=== Public Rooms, Fort Vellore ===
In 1837, the Public Rooms, located with the Vellore Fort and owned and managed by the officers of the military station, were hired by the Company, for the purpose of holding church services on Sundays, for a monthly rent of Rs. 35, for 1 year. This arrangement continued for 3 years. Then the property was purchased by the Government, and church was raised at the site of the Public Rooms (p. 627).

=== St. John's Church, 1846 ===
In 1844, the new church building plan was sanctioned by the Madras Government, and raised within the Vellore Fort in 1846, with a seating capacity of 280 people (p. 74).

Major C G Ottley, the Fort Adjutant of the Vellore Fort, designed and built the new church at the Fort. He was granted a remuneration of Rs. 500 by the Madras Government for his efforts (p. 628).

The Church is named after St. John. However it was never officially dedicated or consecrated in his honor. According to local tradition, the church was never consecrated as it was once a public room used for dancing, acting and other entertainment. Another reason is that there was no resident Company chaplain at the Vellore Fort for nearly 18 years after it was built (p. 629).

== Construction ==
The church's nave measures 50 x 41 ft, its sanctuary in the east 15 x 18 ft, and its 2 vestries 10 x 8 ft. It has a verandah in the west supported by columns and steps to the ground. The cost of the church building was Rs. 5559, with an extra Rs. 500 used for furniture and fittings raised by subscription. The window on the east and the font are in memory of Lt. Col. William Sim McLeod, gifted by his widow (p. 628).

== Refurbishments ==
In 1862, the Arcot military station was dissolved and the European regiment moved to Vellore. When Rev J B Trend served at this church between 1874 and 1879, the sanctuary was refurbished with carved wood, silk needlework, harmonium, brass ornaments, all donated by the congregation (p. 628). The altar plate of the church, inscribed with the coat was arms was presented by the East India Company, of which only the paten now remains (p. 629). In 1883, the Government of Madras spent Rs. 725 on alterations and improvements of the Church (p. 629).

== Military inscriptions ==
The old colours of the 10th Madras Infantry are deposited in the church, before it was converted into a Burmese Battalion, with a brass plate inscription recording the event (p. 629).

== Gallery ==
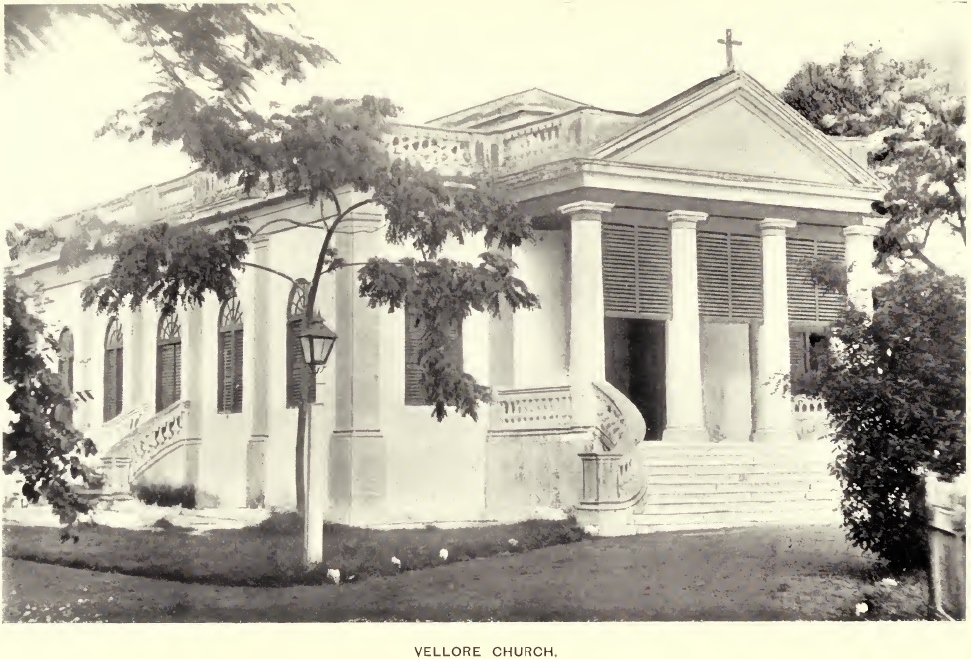
St. Johns Church, Vellore (1904) by Rev. Frank Penny's Book 'The Church in Madras - Vol. I'

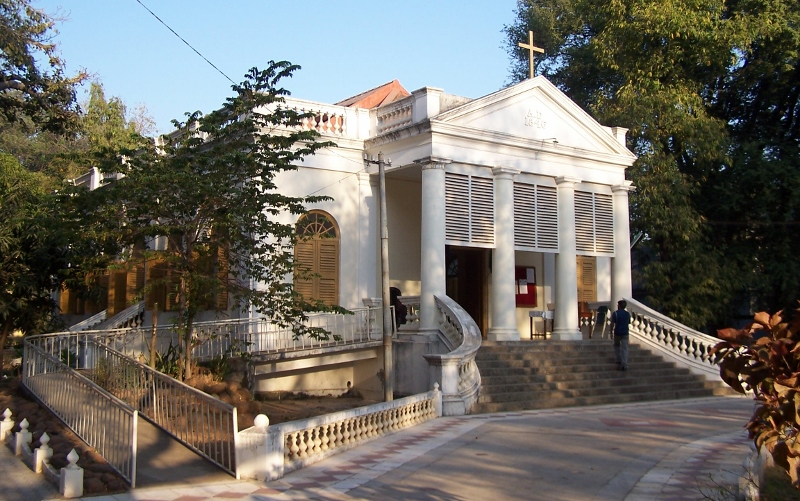
St. John's Church, Vellore (2004)

== Present times ==
Majority of the congregation of the St. John's Church, Vellore, are associated with the Christian Medical College & Hospital (CMC). The Church supports schools and hostels, working along with NGOs such as Compassion India.

== See also ==
- Vellore Fort
- Jalakandeswarar Temple, Vellore
- Sajra and Gojra Forts, Vellore
