= Siege of Vellore =

Series of sieges during the Second Anglo-Mysore War at Vellore, in present-day Tamil Nadu

- Part of Second Anglo-Mysore War
Date	1780 – 1782 (2 years)
Location	Vellore, Kingdom of Mysore
Result	British victory

Belligerents
British East India Company	Kingdom of Mysore

Commanders and leaders
	Hyder Ali

The siege of Vellore was an intermittent series of sieges and blockades conducted during the Second Anglo-Mysore War by forces of the Kingdom of Mysore against a British East India Company garrison holding the fortress at Vellore, located in the present-day Indian state of Tamil Nadu.

First besieged in 1780, Mysore's ruler Hyder Ali eventually reduced the siege to a blockade due to the need for troops elsewhere. The blockade was ineffectively maintained until 1782 before being abandoned. The British successfully resupplied the garrison of Colonel Ross Lang four times.
