= Sharma Nithiyanandam =

South Indian bishop

The Right Reverend Sharma Nithiyanandham
- Bishop of Vellore
- Church: Church of South India
- Diocese: Vellore
- Installed: 2019

Personal details
- Born: 1963 (age 62–63)

Sharma Nithiyanandam is an Anglican bishop in the Church of South India: he was consecrated Bishop of Vellore on 19 May 2019.

Nithiyanandham was educated at Leonard Theological College. He has served Vellore Diocese as chairman of its youth, hostel and mission boards; general convener of the 40th anniversary of the diocesan formation; and as honorary secretary of the Diocesan Council.

He and his wife Jessie have one son.
