= George Shipway =

British writer (1908–1982)

George Shipway (25 May 1908 – 1982) was a British author best known for his historical novels, but he also tried his hand at political satire in his book The Chilian Club.

== Military career ==
George Frederick Morgan Shipway was born on 25 May 1908 at Allahabad in India and was educated at Clifton. He then attended the Royal Military College, Sandhurst and was commissioned on to the Unattached List for the Indian Army on 30 August 1928. He arrived in India on 5 October 1928 and was attached to a British regiment: the 2nd Battalion The Prince of Wales's Volunteers (South Lancashire), for one year from 14 October 1928. This was a standard practice, intended to enable junior officers on the Unattached List to gain practical military experience in an Indian environment before joining their regiments.

After his year Shipway was posted to the 13th Duke of Connaught's Own Lancers on 20 November 1929. Shipway was later to wryly claim that his motive in joining an Indian cavalry regiment was to give him the opportunity to play polo on a regular basis.

He spent two years (1936–1938) as Adjutant of the Mekran Levy Corps. After attending the Quetta Staff college in 1940–41 he became a General Staff Officer, 3rd grade at General Headquarters, India. He remained on the staff until 1944 when he was posted to serve with the Hyderabad Lancers, an Indian State Forces unit.

Shipway retired as a Major and honorary Lieutenant-Colonel on 9 January 1948, following Indian independence. After retiring he became a teacher at Cheam School in Berkshire for 19 years before becoming a novelist at the age of 60.

== Novels ==
Shipway's cavalry background served him well when he took up writing; his descriptions of cavalry battles are full of minute detail and his works generally were meticulously researched. His first novel Imperial Governor (1968) made use of both his military and teaching knowledge to analyse the character of the Roman general Suetonius Paulinus, who suppressed Boudicca's rebellion of AD 60. Other novels dealt with pre-classical Greek, medieval and Indian historical themes.

In his 1969 novel Knight in Anarchy Shipway describes the life of Humphrey de Visdelou as he follows Geoffrey de Mandeville to his doom. In the book Shipway indicates that he lives on the estates that de Visdelou once owned. The Vis de Lou family certainly held lands in Berkshire post-Conquest.

Shipway died in 1982.

== Bibliography ==
- Imperial Governor (1968), Boudicca and Roman Britain. ISBN 0-432-14750-0
- Knight in Anarchy (1969), in the time of Stephen & Matilda. ISBN 0-432-14751-9; American title The Knight
- The Chilian Club (1971), ISBN 0-432-14752-7; American title The Yellow Room
- The Paladin (1972), the story of Walter Tirel, killer of William Rufus. ISBN 0-432-14753-5
- The Wolf Time (1973), sequel to above ISBN 0-432-14754-3
- Free Lance (1975), the British in India during the Napoleonic wars. ISBN 0-432-14755-1
- Strangers in the Land (1976), The Vellore Mutiny of 1806 ISBN 0-432-14756-X
- Warrior in Bronze (1977), the story of Agamemnon. ISBN 0-432-14757-8
- King in Splendour (1979), sequel to above. ISBN 0-432-14758-6
- Imperial Governor: 50th Anniversary Edition (2018), Boudicca and Roman Britain. ISBN 9781939650832
