= Sajra and Gojra Forts =

Forts in Vellore, Tamil Nadu, India

- Vellore in India
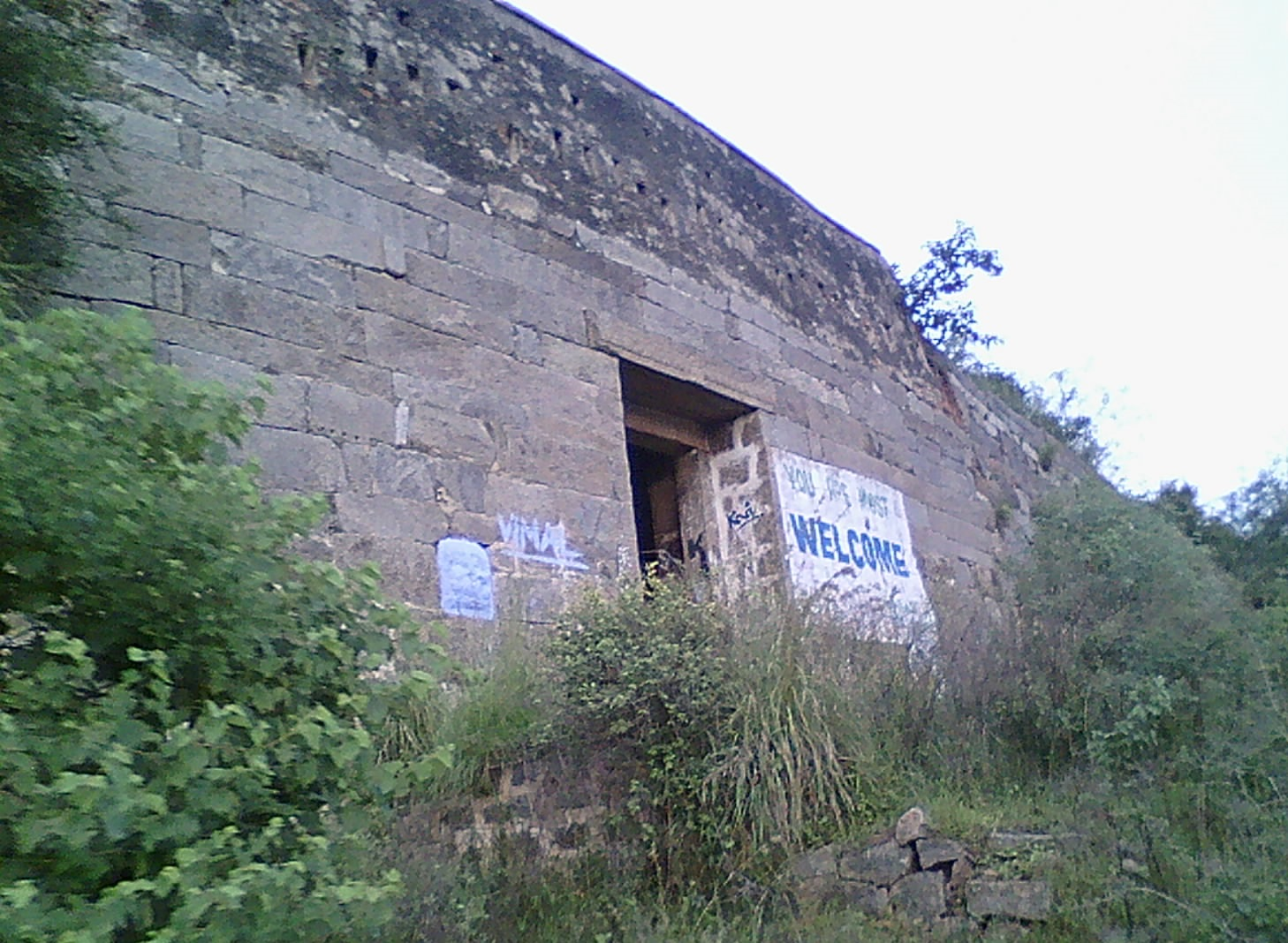
- Gojra Fort entrance

Site information
- Open to the public: Yes

Location
- Location of Sajra and Gojra Forts in Tamil Nadu
- Coordinates: 12°55′03″N 79°08′10″E

Site history
- Built: 1678; 348 years ago
- Built by: Maratha Empire
- Battles/wars: Siege of Vellore Fort

Garrison information
- Occupants: Maratha Empire

Sajra and Gojra forts are hill forts built on top of Naammam Malai hill to the east of Vellore City in the state of Tamil Nadu, India. Sajra and Gojra literally means "smart" and "cute" respectively.

== History ==
In 1678, during the siege of Vellore Fort by Chhatrapati Shivaji Maharaj's army, the commandant of the Vellore Fort Abdulla Khan (Abyssinian) defended the fort. Chhatrapati Shivaji Maharaj deputed his Sardar Sabnis Narhari Rudra with 2000 cavalry and 5000 infantry to continue the siege which lasted fourteen months. He built two small forts, Sajra and Gojra on the hill top which is nearly 2 km from the Vellore Fort. These forts dominated the lower Vellore Fort allowing it to be effectively bombarded. It is said out of the original 500 soldiers defending the fort 400 perished. Abdulla Khan surrendered the Vellore Fort on 21 August 1678, and the Maratha Empire strengthened the Vellore Fort's fortifications, ruling for 30 years.

== See also ==
- Vellore
- Vellore Fort
- Jalakandeswarar Temple, Vellore
- St. John's Church, Vellore
- List of forts in India
