= Jalakandeswarar Temple, Vellore =

Shiva temple in Vellore, India

Jalakandeswarar Temple
- ஜலகண்டேஸ்வரர் கோவில்
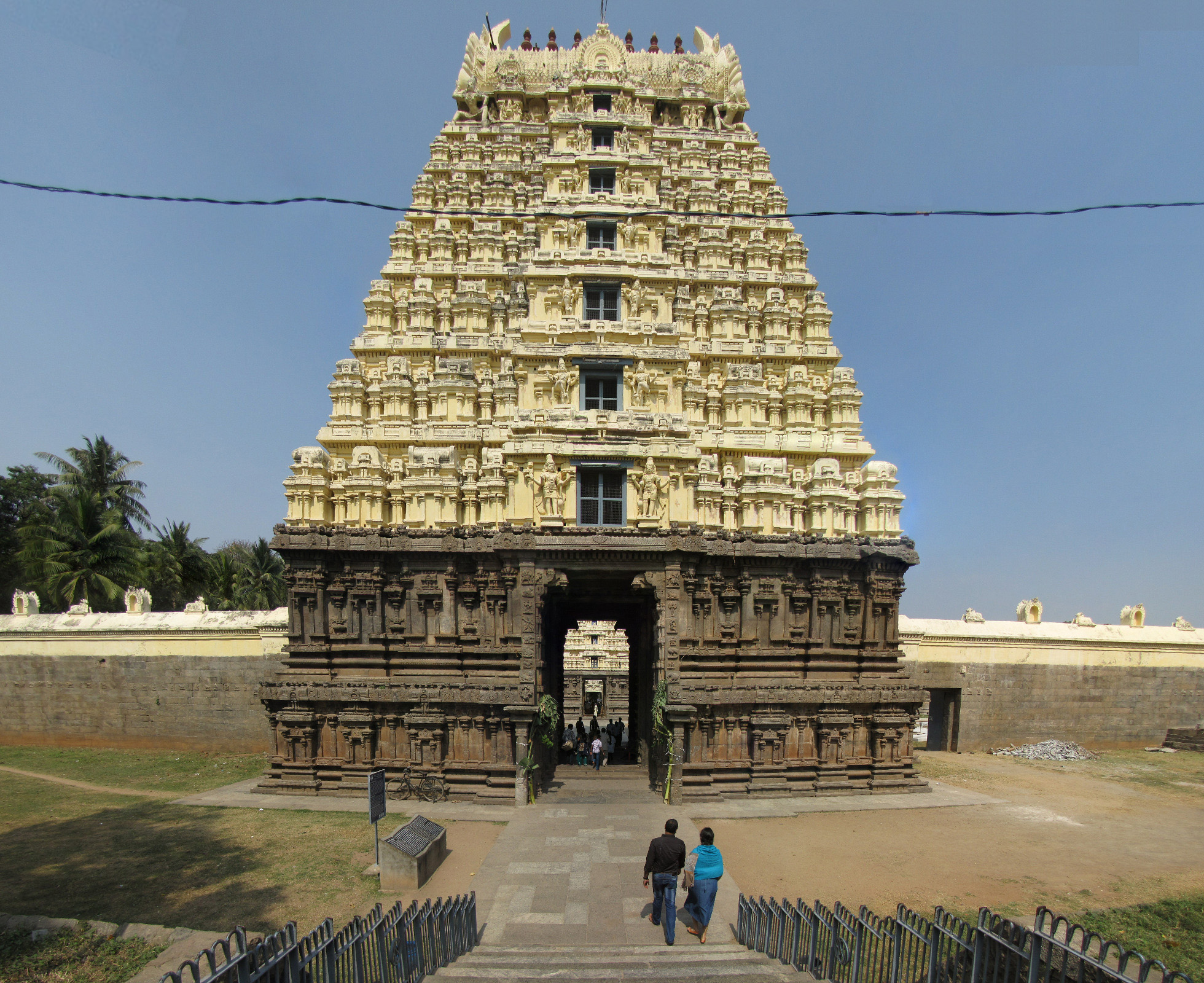

- Jalakandeswarar temple, Vellore, Tamil Nadu

Religion
- Affiliation: Hinduism
- District: Vellore
- Deity: Shiva as Jalakandeswarar

Location
- Location: Vellore Fort
- State: Tamil Nadu
- Country: India
- Coordinates: 12.9206477°N 79.1279232°E

Architecture
- Type: Vijayanagaram Architecture
- Creator: Bommi Reddi
- Completed: 1550 CE
- Elevation: 235.89 m (774 ft)

Jalakandeswarar Temple is a temple dedicated to Lord Shiva which is located in the Vellore Fort, in heart of the Vellore city, in the state of Tamil Nadu, India.

== Location ==
The temple of the Vijaynagar period stands inside the Vellore Fort, which is under the control of the Archaeological Survey of India, along with the St. John's Church, Tippu Mahal, Hyder Mahal, Candy Mahal, Badhusha Mahal and the Begum Mahal.

== History ==
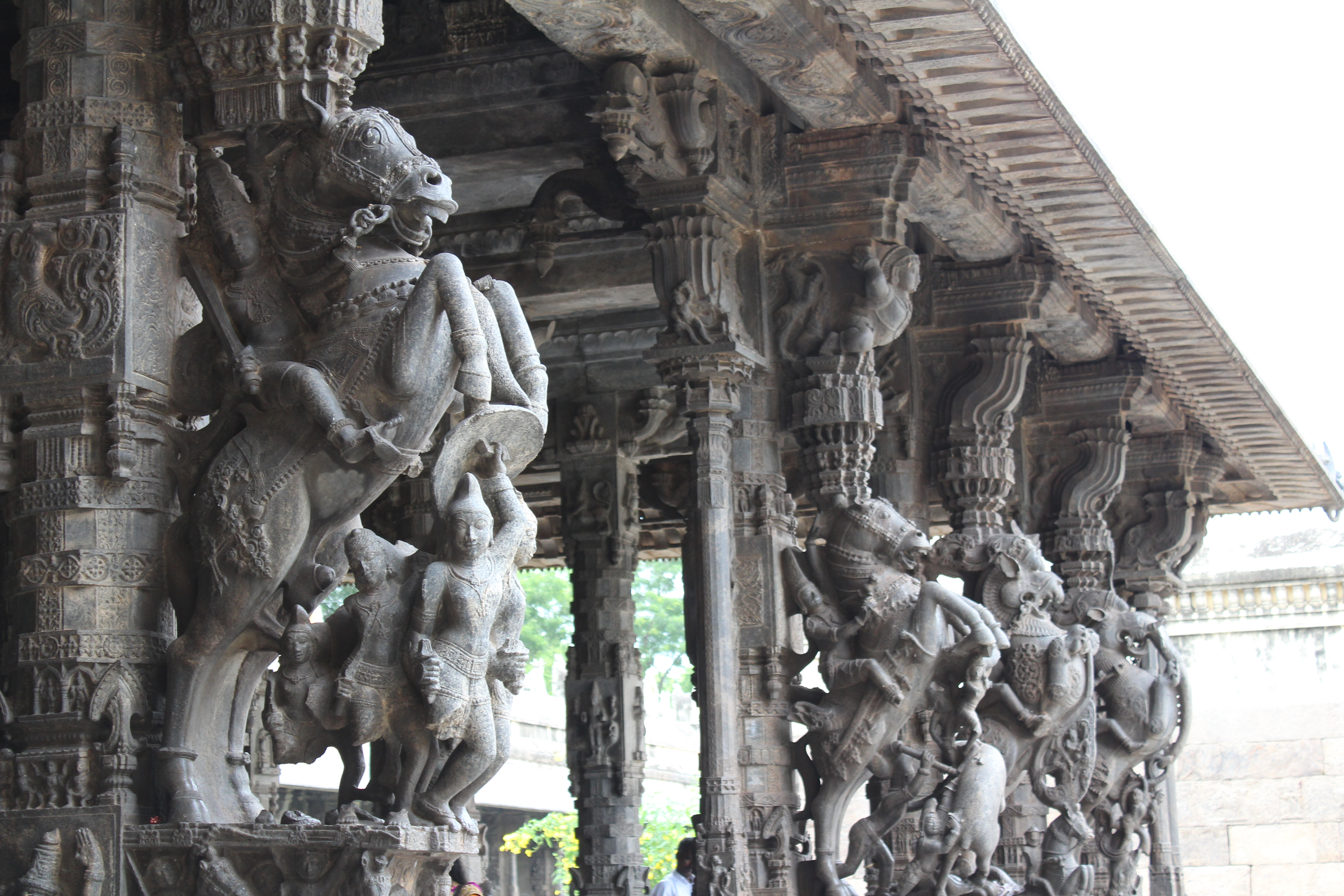
Sculptures in the temple

According to legend, there used to be a giant ant-hill which had grown over a swayambhu Shiva Lingam at the location where the sanctum sanctorum of temple now stands. This ant-hill was surrounded by stagnant water, as a result of collection of rain water. Chinna Bommi Reddi, a Vijayanagaran chieftain, who was controlling the fort had a dream where the Lord Shiva asked him to build a temple at that location. Reddi, proceeded to demolish the anthill, found the lingam and build the temple in 1550 CE, and since the Lingam was surrounded by water (called Jalam in Tamil) the deity was called as Jalakandeswarar (translated as "Lord Siva residing in the water"). The temple was built during the reign of the Vijayanagaran Emperor Sadasivadeva Maharaya (1540–1572 CE). The temple also has the statue of Sri Akhilandeshwari Amma, the consort of Jalakandeswarar.

== Architecture ==
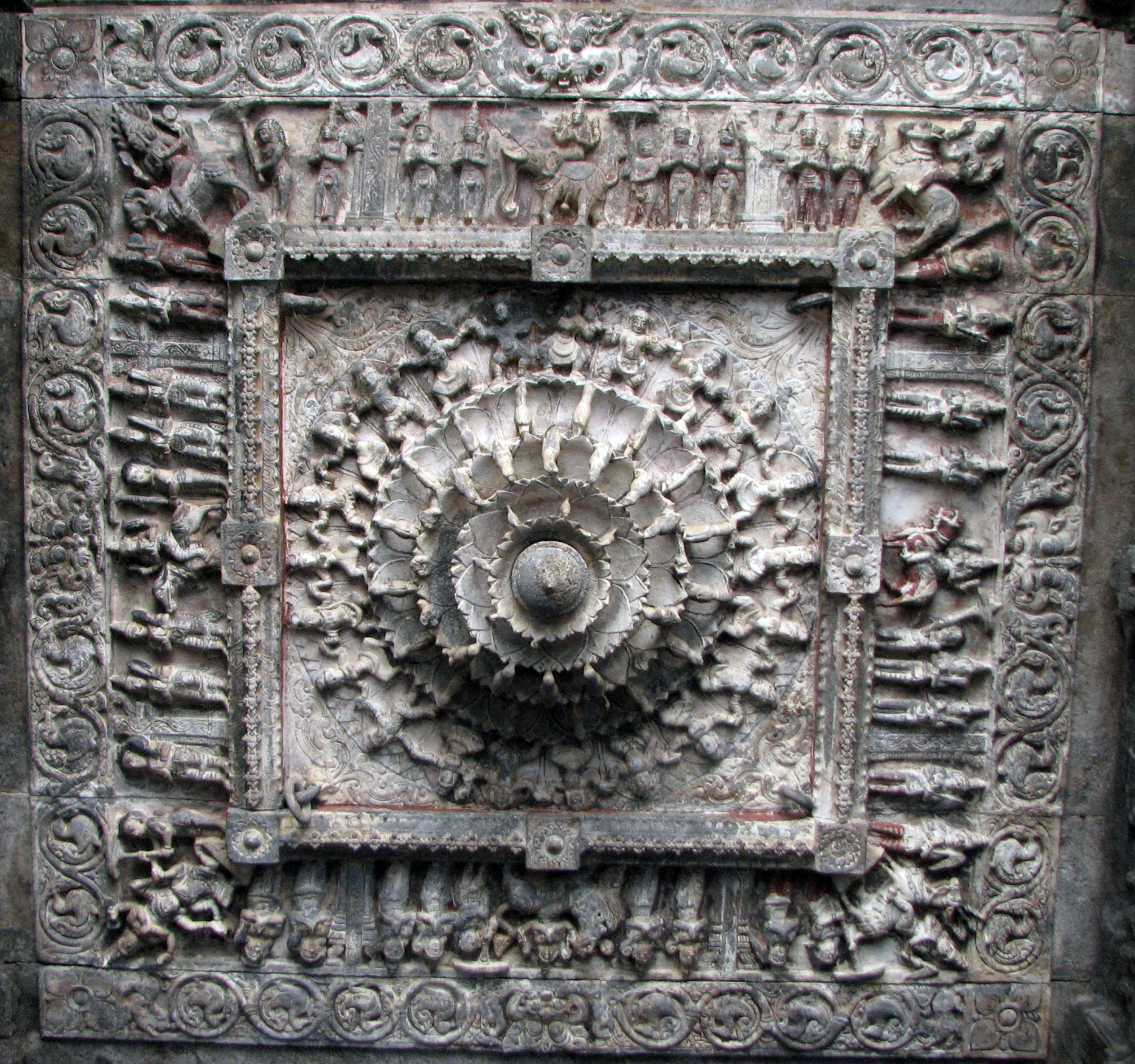
Ceiling carved in stone

The Jalakanteshwara Temple is a fine example of Vijayanagaram Architecture. The temple has nine levels and exquisite carvings on its gopuram (tower), richly carved stone pillars, large wooden gates and stunning monoliths and sculptures. These Vijayanagara sculptures are similar to the ones present in Soundararajaperumal Temple, Thadikombu, Krishnapuram Venkatachalapathy temple, Srivilliputhur Divya Desam and Alagar Koyil. The Gopuram of the tower is over 100 ft. in height. The temple also has a Mandapam, with the hall supported by carved stone pillars of dragons, horses and yalis (lion like creature).

The temple itself is built in the middle of a water tank (called Agazhi in Tamil), and there is water surrounding the temple like a garland. The circumference of the water tank is 8000 ft. The wedding hall (Kalyana Mantapam) inside the temple has a two-faced sculpture, that of a bull and an elephant. The water used for bathing the deity (abishekam) is drawn from an ancient well called the Ganga Gouri Thertam, within the temple.

== Specialty ==
Behind the Nandi statue, there is an earthen lamp, which is said to revolve when some people place their hands on it. The revolving is said to indicate that their wishes have been granted. Some devotees of the temple worship the golden and silver lizard sculptures and the snake sculptures in order to get relief from 'sarpa dosham'.

== Mutilation ==
The temple was mutilated during the Muslim invasion and capture of Vellore Fort. Following the desecration of the temple during Muslim invasion and rule, worship in the temple was stopped. An Islamic structure was also built to serve as a makeshift mosque, after destroying an Amman (Nagalamman) Temple, which stood on that site. The temple was being used as an arsenal for nearly 400 years. On the fears of desecration, the main deity was moved away to the Jalakanda Vinayakar Temple in Sathuvacheri for safe keeping. The temple was vacant for nearly 400 years. In 1921, the Vellore Fort was handed over to the Archaeological Survey of India for maintenance. At that time, the temple was not used for worship, and the ASI was keen to maintain this status quo. However, in 1981, the deity was brought inside the fort by Mailai Sundaram Guruji of Thangal Ashram and re-installed inside the temple, and worship re-instated.

== Re-consecration, 1981 ==
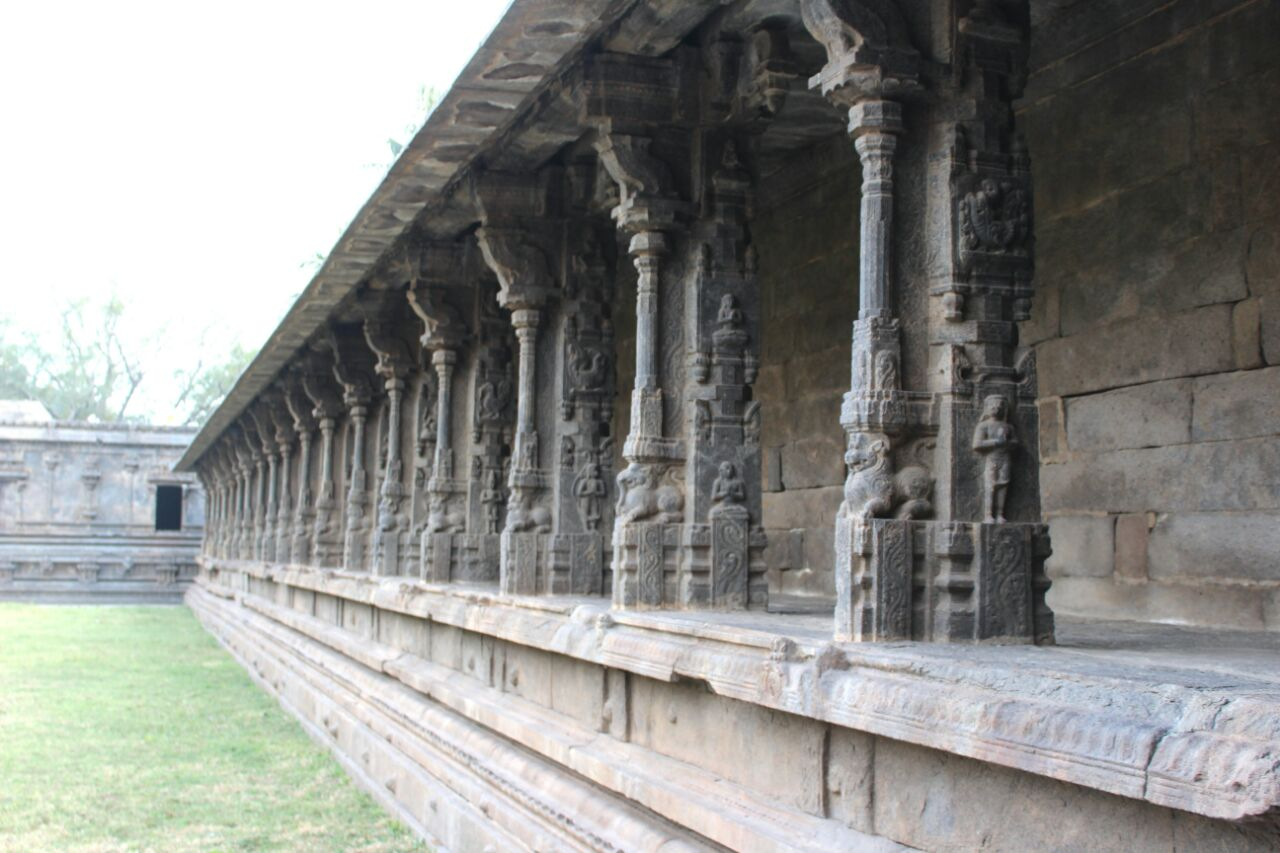
Pillared halls inside the temple

Several attempts had been made in the 20th century, to re-instate the main deity inside the Jalakandeswarar Temple. However, the Archaeological Survey of India wanted to maintain the status quo, and did want the temple to be used for worship. However, on 16 March 1981, the deity was removed from the Jalakanda Vinayakar Temple in Sathuvacheri and secretly brought inside the fort, hiding it inside a closed truck, and stealthily installed in the early morning hours. The temple was open to religious practices from 1982.

According to AK Seshadhri, author of the book 'Vellore Fort and the Temple through the Ages', "The staff of ASI could do nothing to prevent the forcible action of the devotees, except watch the happenings and complain the incident to the police and the district collector. The district authorities took no action, saying that this is a sensitive religious matter and therefore any preventive action would lead to a law and order problem…"

Consequently, the first kumbabishekam after re-consecration was held in 1982, followed by 1997 and 2011. For the third kumbabishekam in 2011, a special gold-plated ratha (car) are made at a cost of ₹ 30 million, and used nearly 7 kg gold.

In 2006, the 25th anniversary of the re-consecration of the Jalakandeswarar Temple was celebrated by taking out the deity in a grand procession passing through Long Bazaar, Saidapet, Kagitha Pattarai and Main Bazaar of Vellore.

== Administration ==
On Saturday, 22 June 2013, the Department of Hindu Religious and Charitable Endowments, Government of Tamil Nadu took over the administration of the Jalakandeswarar Temple, at the Vellore Fort, following government order dated 18 June 2013, asking the Assistant Commissioner of Vellore to take over the temple and assume charge as the 'Fit Person' (Thakkar) of the temple. Previously the temple was managed by a private trust called Sri Jalakanteswarar Dharma Sthapanam. The private trust had opposed the takeover, by approaching the Madras High Court. However, nearly 10 years of legal proceedings resulted in the court ruling in favor of the Government of Tamil Nadu. However, the temple structure is owned and maintained by the Archaeological Survey of India, with only the administration taken over by the government.

== Gallery ==
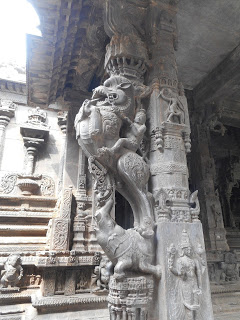

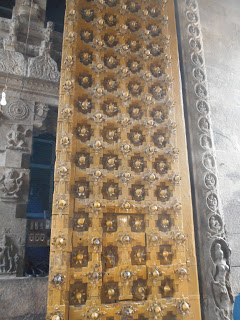

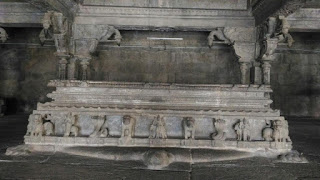

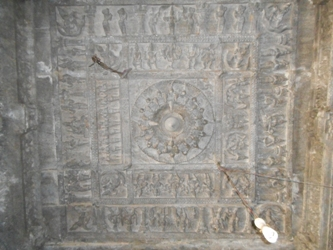

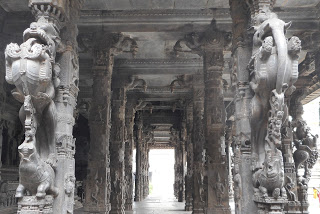

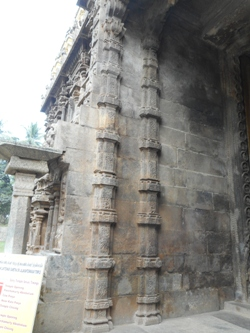

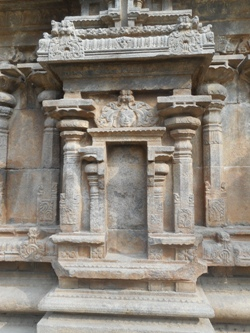

== See also ==
- Vellore Fort
- St. John's Church, Vellore
- Sajra and Gojra Forts, Vellore
