= Vellore Mutiny =

1806 revolt against the East India Company

Vellore Sepoy Mutiny
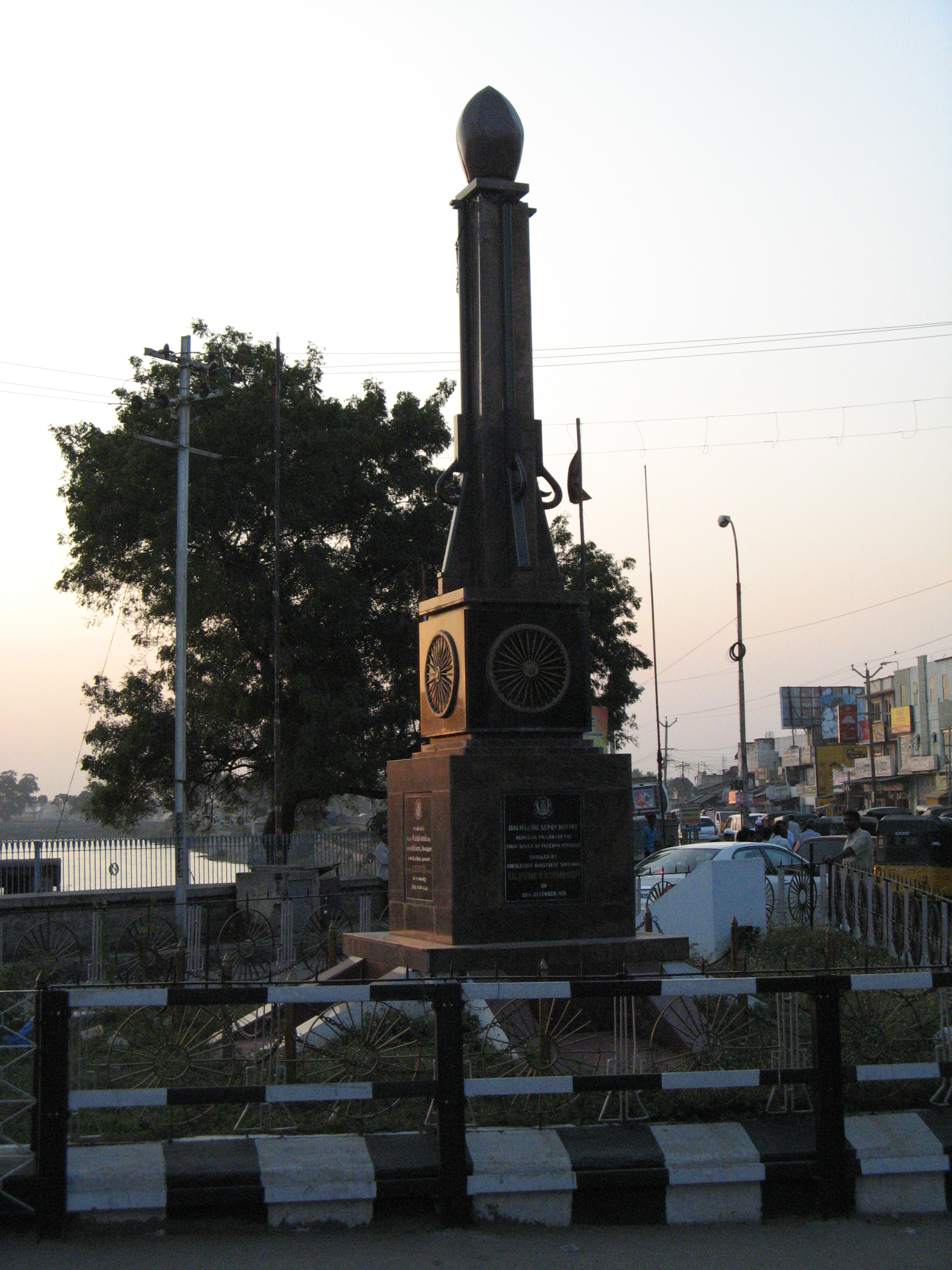
- Pillar at Hazrath Makkaan Junction commemorating the Vellore sepoy mutiny.
- Date: 10 July 1806
- Duration: 1 day
- Location: Vellore Fort, Vellore, Madras Presidency, Company Raj
- Type: Mutiny
- Casualties: Indian rebel sepoys: 100 summarily executed. Total 350 sepoys killed, 350 wounded. British officers of sepoy regiments: 14; British soldiers of 69th Regiment: 115

The Vellore Mutiny, also known as the Vellore Rebellion or Vellore Revolt, occurred on 10 July 1806 and was the first instance of a large-scale and violent mutiny by Indian sepoys against the East India Company, predating the Indian Rebellion of 1857 by half a century. The revolt, which took place in the Indian city of Vellore, lasted one full day, during which mutineers seized the Vellore Fort and killed or wounded 200 British troops. The mutiny was subdued by cavalry and artillery from Arcot. Total deaths amongst the mutineers were approximately 350; with summary executions of about 100 during the suppression of the outbreak, followed by the formal court-martial of smaller numbers.

== Causes ==
The immediate causes of the mutiny revolved mainly around resentment felt towards changes in the sepoy dress code and general appearance, introduced in November 1805. Hindus were prohibited from wearing religious marks on their foreheads while on duty, and Muslims were required to shave their beards and trim their moustaches. In addition General Sir John Cradock, Commander-in-Chief of the Madras Army, ordered the wearing of a round hat resembling that associated at the time with both Europeans in general and with Indian converts to Christianity. The new headdress included a leather cockade and was intended to replace an existing model resembling a turban and considered unsuitable for service. These measures offended the sensibilities of both Hindu and Muslim sepoys and went contrary to an earlier warning by a military board that sepoy uniform changes should be "given every consideration which a subject of that delicate and important nature required".

These changes, intended to improve the "soldierly appearance" of the men, created strong resentment among the Indian soldiers. In May 1806 some sepoys who protested the new rules were sent to Fort Saint George, in Madras (Chennai). Two of them – a Hindu and a Muslim – were given 90 lashes each and dismissed from the army. Nineteen sepoys were sentenced to 50 lashes each but successfully gained pardon from the East India Company.

In addition to the military grievances listed above, the rebellion was also instigated by the sons of the defeated Tipu Sultan, confined at Vellore since 1799. Tipu's wives and sons, together with numerous retainers, were pensioners of the East India Company and lived in a palace within the large complex comprising the Vellore Fort. One of Tipu Sultan's daughters was to be married on 9 July 1806, and the plotters of the uprising gathered at the fort under the pretext of attending the wedding. The objectives of the civilian conspirators remain obscure but by seizing and holding the fort they may have hoped to encourage a general rising through the territory of the former Mysore Sultanate. However, Tipu's sons were reluctant to take charge after the mutiny arose.

== Outbreak ==
The garrison of the Vellore Fort in July 1806 comprised four companies of British infantry from H.M. 69th (South Lincolnshire) Regiment of Foot and three battalions of Madras infantry: the 1st/1st, 2nd/1st and 2nd/23rd Madras Native Infantry. The usual practice for sepoys having families with them in Vellore was to live in individual huts outside the walls. However the scheduling of a field-day for the Madras units on 10 July had required most of the sepoys to spend that night sleeping within the fort so that they could be quickly assembled on parade before dawn.

Two hours after midnight on 10 July, the sepoys killed fourteen of their own officers and 115 men of the 69th Regiment, most of the latter as they slept in their barracks. Among those killed was Colonel St. John Fancourt, the commander of the fort. The rebels seized control by dawn, and raised the flag of the Mysore Sultanate over the fort. Retainers of Tipu's second son Fateh Hyder emerged from the palace part of the complex and joined with the mutineers.

However, a British officer, Major Coopes, had been outside the walls of the fort that night and was able to alert the garrison in Arcot. Nine hours after the outbreak of the mutiny, a relief force comprising the British 19th Light Dragoons, galloper guns and a squadron of the 3rd Regiment of Madras Native Cavalry, rode from Arcot to Vellore, covering 16 miles (26 km) in about two hours. It was led by Captain Robert Rollo Gillespie, who reportedly left Arcot within a quarter of an hour of the alarm being raised. Gillespie dashed ahead of the main force with a single troop of about twenty men. Arriving at Vellore, Gillespie found the surviving Europeans, about sixty men of the 69th, commanded by NCOs and two assistant surgeons, still holding part of the ramparts but out of ammunition. Unable to gain entry through the defended gate, Gillespie climbed the wall with the aid of a rope and a sergeant's sash which was lowered to him; and, to gain time, led the 69th in a bayonet-charge along the ramparts. When the rest of the 19th arrived, Gillespie had them blow open the gates with their galloper guns, and made a second charge with the 69th to clear a space inside the entrance to permit the cavalry to deploy. The Light Dragoons and the Madras Cavalry then charged and sabred any sepoy who stood in their way. About 100 sepoys who had sought refuge inside the palace were brought out, and by Gillespie's order, placed against a wall and shot dead. John Blakiston, the engineer who had blown in the gates, recalled:

Even this appalling sight I could look upon, I may almost say, with composure. It was an act of summary justice, and in every respect a most proper one; yet, at this distance of time, I find it a difficult matter to approve the deed, or to account for the feeling under which I then viewed it.

The prompt and ruthless response to the mutiny snuffed out any further unrest. Gillespie later admitted that, with a delay of even five minutes, all would have been lost for the British. In all, nearly 350 of the rebels were killed, and about the same number wounded before the fighting had finished. Surviving sepoys scattered across the countryside outside the fort. Many were captured by local police; to be eventually released or returned to Vellore for court-martial.

== Aftermath ==
After formal trial, six mutineers were blown away from guns, five shot by firing squad, eight hanged and five transported. The three Madras battalions involved in the mutiny were all disbanded. The senior British officers responsible for the offending dress regulations were recalled to England, including the Commander-in-Chief of the Madras Army, John Craddock, the company refusing to pay even his passage. The orders regarding the 'new turbans' (round hats) were also cancelled.

After the incident, the incarcerated royals in Vellore fort were transferred to Calcutta. The Governor of Madras, William Bentinck, too was recalled, the Company's Court of Directors regretting that "greater care and caution had not been exercised in examining into the real sentiments and dispositions of the sepoys before measures of severity were adopted to enforce the order respecting the use of the new turban." The controversial interference with the social and religious customs of the sepoys was also abolished.

There are some parallels between the Vellore Mutiny and that of the Indian Rebellion of 1857, although the latter was on a much larger scale. In 1857 the sepoys proclaimed the return of Mughal rule by re-installing Bahadur Shah as Emperor of India; in the same way mutineers of Vellore, nearly 50 years before, had attempted to restore power to Tipu Sultan's sons. Perceived insensitivity to sepoy religious and cultural practices (in the form of leather headdresses and greased cartridges) was a factor in both uprisings. The events of 1857 (which involved the Bengal Army and did not affect the Madras Army) caused the British crown to take over company property and functions within India through the Government of India Act 1858 which saw the total dissolution of the East India Company.

The only surviving eyewitness account of the actual outbreak of the mutiny is that of Amelia Farrer, Lady Fancourt (the wife of St. John Fancourt, the commander of the fort). Her manuscript account, written two weeks after the massacre, describes how she and her children survived as her husband perished.

== In literature ==
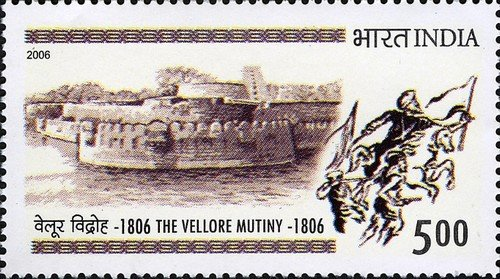
The Vellore Mutiny 1806 Stamp of India - 2006

English poet Sir Henry Newbolt's poem "Gillespie" is an account of the events of the Vellore mutiny.

The novel Strangers in the Land (1976; ISBN 0-432-14756-X) by George Shipway centres on the Vellore mutiny, from the perspectives of both British and Indian participants.

== See also ==
- Barrackpore mutiny of 1824
- Indian independence movement
- Rani Velu Nachiyar
- British India
