= Diocese of Vellore of the Church of South India =

Diocese of the Church of South India in Tamil Nadu, India

Diocese of Vellore

Location
- Country: India
- Ecclesiastical province: Church of South India

Statistics
- Congregations: 536
- Members: 1,72,000

Current leadership
- Bishop: Rt. Rev. Dr. H. Sharma Nithiyanandam Vice President - Rev. George Edvin Secretary - Mr. Job Kanagaraj Treasurer - Mr. Andrew Sam Ratnasingh

Website
- www.csivellorediocese.com

The Diocese of Vellore is one among the 24 dioceses of Church of South India, a United Protestant denomination. The motto chosen for the diocese was "In the Cross of Christ I Glory" (based on Galatians chapter 6 verse 14). Its emblem includes a banyan tree - the tree under which the Scudder brothers prayed before they decided to begin their work in the area of Vellore.

== History ==
The diocese was created by bifurcating the western half of the Diocese of Madras and was officially formed on 26 January 1976. Vellore Diocese is predominantly rural and crosses the state boundaries of Tamil Nadu and Andhra Pradesh. So Vellore Diocese can be also called a bilingual diocese.

== Area Councils ==
- Eastern Area Council - 26 Pastorates
- Central Area Council - 37 Pastorates
- Southern Area Council - 17 Pastorates
- Northern Area Council - 24 Pastorates

Two more Councils were in proposal, (Viz: Central Urban Area Council & Western Area Council)

== Bishops of the diocese ==
- Sam J. Ponniah (1978–1987)
- R. Trinity Baskeran
- Mahimai Rufus
- Y. William (2008–2012)
- A. Rajavelu (2012 – 30 June 2018) Elected from CSI Christ Church, Gandhinagar, Vellore
- Sharma Nithiyanandam (as of 2019)Elected from CSI Christ Church, Gandhinagar, Vellore

== Institutions under CSI Vellore Diocese ==
Church of South India Vellore Diocese has 105 elementary schools, 5 high schools, 5 higher secondary schools, 2 teachers' training institutes, 4 primary schools, 1 arts & science college, 3 Matriculation higher secondary schools, 2 nursing schools and 2 hospitals.

Hospitals

- CSI Hospital, Vandavasi
- Scudder Memorial Hospital, Ranipet

Nursing Schools

- School of Nursing, Ranipet
- School of Nursing, Vandavasi

Higher Secondary Schools

- Wyckoff Higher Secondary School, Muttathur
- Voorhees Higher Secondary School, Vellore
- CSI Christ Matriculation School for Girls, Tirupattur
- CSI SIPCOT Matriculation Higher Secondary School

Arts & Science College

- Voorhees College, Vellore

== St. John's Church, Vellore Fort ==
St. John's Church, Vellore located inside the Vellore Fort was raised in 1846 by the Government of Madras for the officers and men of the East India Company military station. The church is named after St. John the Evangelist. However, the church was never officially consecrated and hence not officially named St. John’s Church. St. John's Church is the oldest standing church in the Vellore Diocese.

== See also ==
- Church of South India
- Diocese of Coimbatore
- Diocese of Madras
- Madurai-Ramnad Diocese
- Thoothukudi - Nazareth Diocese
- Tirunelveli Diocese
- Trichy-Tanjore Diocese
- Diocese of Kanyakumari
- Joseph John (minister)
