= 16th Tamil Nadu Assembly =

2021–2026 Tamil Nadu Assembly term

←	15th	17th	→

Overview
- Legislative body: Tamil Nadu Legislative Assembly
- Meeting place: Fort St. George, Chennai
- Term: 11 May 2021 – 5 May 2026
- Election: 2021 Tamil Nadu Legislative Assembly election
- Government: M. K. Stalin ministry
- Opposition: All India Anna Dravida Munnetra Kazhagam
- Website: Official website
- Members: 234
- Speaker: M. Appavu
- Deputy Speaker: K. Pitchandi
- Chief Minister: M. K. Stalin
- Deputy Chief Minister: Udhayanidhi Stalin (2024-2026)
- Leader of the Opposition: Edappadi K. Palaniswami
- Party control: Dravida Munnetra Kazhagam

The 16th Assembly of Tamil Nadu succeeded the 15th Tamil Nadu Assembly and was constituted after the victory of Dravida Munnetra Kazhagam (DMK) and allies in the 2021 Tamil Nadu Legislative Assembly election. M. K. Stalin was elected chief minister and assumed office on 7 May 2021.

== Office bearers ==
The main officials of the Tamil Nadu Legislative Assembly are:

Office	Office Bearer
Speaker	M. Appavu
Deputy Speaker	K. Pitchandi
Chief Minister	M. K. Stalin
Deputy Chief Minister	Udhayanidhi Stalin
Leader of the House	Durai Murugan
Leader of Opposition	Edappadi K. Palaniswami
Deputy Leader of the Opposition	R. B. Udhayakumar
Government Whip	Govi. Chezhian

== Chief Minister ==
Chief Minister	Took office	Left office	Term
M. K. Stalin	7 May 2021	9 May 2026	1,828 days

== Council of Ministers ==
Sr. No.	Name	Constituency	Portfolio(s)	Party	Term of office	
Sr. No.	Name	Constituency	Portfolio(s)	Party	Took office	Duration
Chief Minister
1	M. K. Stalin	Kolathur	Public, General Administration, Indian Administrative Service, Indian Police Service, Indian Forest Service, other All India Service, District Revenue Officers, Police, Home, and Welfare of Differently abled persons	DMK	7 May 2021	5 years and 2 days
Deputy Chief Minister
2	Udhayanidhi Stalin	Chepauk-Thiruvallikeni	Youth Welfare, Sports Development, Special Programme Implementation Department & Poverty Alleviation Programme and Rural Indebtedness, Planning, Development and Special Initiatives	DMK	14 December 2022	3 years, 4 months and 25 days
Cabinet Ministers
3	Durai Murugan	Katpadi	Irrigation Projects including Small Irrigation, Legislative Assembly, Governor and Ministry, Elections and Passports, Law	DMK	7 May 2021	5 years and 2 days
4	K. N. Nehru	Tiruchirappalli West	Municipal Administration, Urban and Water Supply	DMK	7 May 2021	5 years and 2 days
5	I. Periyasamy	Athoor	Rural Development, Panchayats and Panchayat Union	DMK	7 May 2021	5 years and 2 days
6	E. V. Velu	Tiruvannamalai	Public Works (Buildings), Highways and Minor Ports	DMK	7 May 2021	5 years and 2 days
7	M. R. K. Panneerselvam	Kurinjipadi	Agriculture, Agricultural Engineering, Agro Service Co-operatives, Horticulture, Sugarcane Excise, Sugarcane Development and Waste Land Development	DMK	7 May 2021	5 years and 2 days
8	K. K. S. S. R. Ramachandran	Aruppukottai	Revenue, District Revenue Establishment, Deputy Collectors, Disaster Management	DMK	7 May 2021	5 years and 2 days
9	Thangam Thennarasu	Tiruchuli	Finance, Statistics, Archaeology, Environment and Climate Change	DMK	7 May 2021	5 years and 2 days
10	S. Regupathy	Tirumayam	Courts, Prisons, Prevention of Corruption and Minerals And Mines	DMK	7 May 2021	5 years and 2 days
11	S. Muthusamy	Erode West	Housing, Rural Housing, Town Planning Projects and Housing Development, Accommodation Control, Urban Planning, Urban Development, Prohibition and Excise, Molasses	DMK	7 May 2021	5 years and 2 days
12	K. R. Periyakaruppan	Tiruppattur	Co-operation	DMK	7 May 2021	5 years and 2 days
13	T. M. Anbarasan	Alandur	Rural Industries including Cottage Industries, Small Industries, Tamil Nadu Urban Habitat Development Board	DMK	7 May 2021	5 years and 2 days
14	M. P. Saminathan	Kangayam	Tamil Official Language and Tamil Culture, Information & Publicity, Film Technology and Cinematograph Act, Newsprint Control, Stationery and Printing, Government Press	DMK	7 May 2021	5 years and 2 days
15	P. Geetha Jeevan	Thoothukkudi	Social Welfare including Women and Children Welfare, Orphanages and Correctional Administration, Integrated Child Development Scheme and Beggar Homes and Social Reforms & Nutritious Meal Programme	DMK	7 May 2021	5 years and 2 days
16	Anitha R. Radhakrishnan	Tiruchendur	Fisheries, Fisheries Development Corporation and Animal Husbandry	DMK	7 May 2021	5 years and 2 days
17	Raja Kannappan	Mudukulathur	Forests, Khadi and Village Industries Board	DMK	7 May 2021	5 years and 2 days
18	R. Rajendran	Salem North	Tourism and Tourism Development Corporation	DMK	28 September 2024	1 year, 7 months and 11 days
19	R. Sakkarapani	Oddanchatram	Food and Civil Supplies, Consumer Protection and Price Control	DMK	7 May 2021	5 years and 2 days
20	R. Gandhi	Ranipet	Handlooms and Textiles, Boodhan and Gramadhan	DMK	7 May 2021	5 years and 2 days
21	Ma. Subramanian	Saidapet	Health, Medical Education and Family Welfare	DMK	7 May 2021	5 years and 2 days
22	P. Moorthy	Madurai East	Commercial Taxes, Registration and Stamp Act, Weights and Measures, Debt Relief including legislation on Money lending, Chits and Registration of Companies	DMK	7 May 2021	5 years and 2 days
23	S. S. Sivasankar	Kunnam	Transport, Nationalized Transport and Motor Vehicles Act, Electricity, Non-Conventional Energy Development	DMK	7 May 2021	5 years and 2 days
24	P. K. Sekar Babu	Harbour	Hindu Religious and Charitable Endowments, CMDA	DMK	7 May 2021	5 years and 2 days
25	Govi. Chezhian	Thiruvidamarudur	Higher Education including Technical Education, Electronics, Science and Technology	DMK	28 September 2024	1 year, 7 months and 11 days
26	Palanivel Thiagarajan	Madurai Central	Information Technology & Digital Services	DMK	7 May 2021	5 years and 2 days
27	S. M. Nasar	Avadi	Minorities Welfare, Non-Resident Tamils, Refugees & Evacuees and Wakf Board	DMK	28 September 2024	1 year, 7 months and 11 days
28	Anbil Mahesh Poyyamozhi	Thiruverumbur	School Education	DMK	7 May 2021	5 years and 2 days
29	Siva V. Meyyanathan	Alangudi	Backward Classes Welfare, Most Backward Classes Welfare and De-notified Communities Welfare	DMK	7 May 2021	5 years and 2 days
30	C. V. Ganesan	Tittakudi	Labour Welfare, Population, Employment and Training, Census, Urban and Rural Employment	DMK	7 May 2021	5 years and 2 days
31	Mano Thangaraj	Padmanabhapuram	Milk and Dairy Development	DMK	28 April 2025	1 year and 11 days
32	T.R.B.Rajaa	Mannargudi	Industries	DMK	7 May 2021	5 years and 2 days
33	M. Mathiventhan	Rasipuram	Adi Dravidar Welfare, Hill Tribes and Bonded Labour Welfare	DMK	7 May 2021	5 years and 2 days
34	N. Kayalvizhi	Dharapuram	Human Resources Management, Pensions and Pensionary benefits, Ex-Servicemen	DMK	7 May 2021	5 years and 2 days

== Composition ==
Alliance	Political party	No. of MLAs	Leader of the party
Government; SPA; Seats: 158	Dravida Munnetra Kazhagam	133	M. K. Stalin (Chief Minister)
Government; SPA; Seats: 158	Indian National Congress	17	S. Rajesh Kumar
Government; SPA; Seats: 158	Viduthalai Chiruthaigal Katchi	4	Sinthanai Selvan
Government; SPA; Seats: 158	Communist Party of India (Marxist)	2	V. P. Nagaimaali
Government; SPA; Seats: 158	Communist Party of India	2	T. Ramachandran
Opposition; AIADMK+ Seats: 67	All India Anna Dravida Munnetra Kazhagam	60	Edappadi K. Palaniswami (Leader of the Opposition)
Opposition; AIADMK+ Seats: 67	Bharatiya Janata Party	4	Nainar Nagenthran
Opposition; AIADMK+ Seats: 67	Pattali Makkal Katchi	3	S. P. Venkateshwaran
Others; Seats: 2	Ayya Pattali Makkal Katchi	2	G. K. Mani
Vacant; Seats: 7	Valparai; Senthamangalam; Alangulam; Gobichettipalayam; Orathanad; Bodinayakkanur; Usilampatti	7	—N/a
Total		234	

== Members ==
District	No.	Constituency	Name	Party	Alliance	Remarks
Tiruvallur	1	Gummidipoondi	T. J. Govindrajan	DMK	SPA	
Tiruvallur	2	Ponneri (SC)	Durai Chandrasekar	INC	SPA	
Tiruvallur	3	Tiruttani	S. Chandran	DMK	SPA	
Tiruvallur	4	Thiruvallur	V. G. Raajendran	DMK	SPA	
Tiruvallur	5	Poonamallee (SC)	A. Krishnaswamy	DMK	SPA	
Tiruvallur	6	Avadi	S. M. Nasar	DMK	SPA	
Chennai	7	Maduravoyal	K. Ganapathy	DMK	SPA	
Chennai	8	Ambattur	Joseph Samuel	DMK	SPA	
Chennai	9	Madavaram	S. Sudharsanam	DMK	SPA	
Chennai	10	Thiruvottiyur	K. P. Shankar	DMK	SPA	
Chennai	11	Dr. Radhakrishnan Nagar	J. J. Ebenezer	DMK	SPA	
Chennai	12	Perambur	R. D. Shekar	DMK	SPA	
Chennai	13	Kolathur	M. K. Stalin	DMK	SPA	Chief Minister
Chennai	14	Villivakkam	A. Vetriazhagan	DMK	SPA	
Chennai	15	Thiru-Vi-Ka-Nagar (SC)	P. Sivakumar	DMK	SPA	
Chennai	16	Egmore (SC)	I. Paranthamen	DMK	SPA	
Chennai	17	Royapuram	Idream R. Murthy	DMK	SPA	
Chennai	18	Harbour	P. K. Sekar Babu	DMK	SPA	
Chennai	19	Chepauk-Thiruvallikeni	Udhayanidhi Stalin	DMK	SPA	Deputy Chief Minister
Chennai	20	Thousand Lights	Dr. Ezhilan Naganathan	DMK	SPA	
Chennai	21	Anna Nagar	M. K. Mohan	DMK	SPA	
Chennai	22	Virugampakkam	A. M. V. Prabhakara Raja	DMK	SPA	
Chennai	23	Saidapet	Ma. Subramanian	DMK	SPA	
Chennai	24	Thiyagarayanagar	J. Karunanithi	DMK	SPA	
Chennai	25	Mylapore	Dha. Velu	DMK	SPA	
Chennai	26	Velachery	J. M. H. Aassan Maulaana	INC	SPA	
Chennai	27	Shozhinganallur	S. Aravind Ramesh	DMK	SPA	
Chennai	28	Alandur	T. M. Anbarasan	DMK	SPA	
Kanchipuram	29	Sriperumbudur (SC)	K. Selvaperunthagai	INC	SPA	
Chengalpattu	30	Pallavaram	I. Karunanithi	DMK	SPA	
Chengalpattu	31	Tambaram	S. R. Raja	DMK	SPA	
Chengalpattu	32	Chengalpattu	M. Varalakshmi	DMK	SPA	
Chengalpattu	33	Thiruporur	S. S. Balaji	VCK	SPA	
Chengalpattu	34	Cheyyur (SC)	Panaiyur M. Babu	VCK	SPA	
Chengalpattu	35	Madurantakam (SC)	Maragatham Kumaravel	AIADMK	NDA	
Kanchipuram	36	Uthiramerur	K. Sundar	DMK	SPA	
Kanchipuram	37	Kancheepuram	C. V. M. P. Ezhilarasan	DMK	SPA	
Ranipet	38	Arakkonam (SC)	S. Ravi	AIADMK	NDA	
Ranipet	39	Sholinghur	A. M. Munirathinam	INC	SPA	
Vellore	40	Katpadi	Durai Murugan	DMK	SPA	Leader of the House
Ranipet	41	Ranipet	R. Gandhi	DMK	SPA	
Ranipet	42	Arcot	J. L. Eswarappan	DMK	SPA	
Vellore	43	Vellore	P. Karthikeyan	DMK	SPA	
Vellore	44	Anaikattu	A. P. Nandakumar	DMK	SPA	
Vellore	45	Kilvaithinankuppam (SC)	M. Jagan Moorthy	AIADMK	NDA	
Vellore	46	Gudiyattam (SC)	V. Amulu	DMK	SPA	
Tirupathur	47	Vaniyambadi	G. Sendhil Kumar	AIADMK	NDA	
Tirupathur	48	Ambur	A. C. Vilwanathan	DMK	SPA	
Tirupathur	49	Jolarpet	K. Devaraji	DMK	SPA	
Tirupathur	50	Tirupattur	A. Nallathambi	DMK	SPA	
Krishnagiri	51	Uthangarai (SC)	T. M. Tamilselvam	AIADMK	NDA	
Krishnagiri	52	Bargur	D. Mathiazhagan	DMK	SPA	
Krishnagiri	53	Krishnagiri	K. Ashok Kumar	AIADMK	NDA	
Krishnagiri	54	Veppanahalli	K. P. Munusamy	AIADMK	NDA	
Krishnagiri	55	Hosur	Y. Prakaash	DMK	SPA	
Krishnagiri	56	Thalli	T. Ramachandran	CPI	SPA	
Dharmapuri	57	Palacode	K. P. Anbalagan	AIADMK	NDA	
Dharmapuri	58	Pennagaram	G. K. Mani	PMK	NDA	
Dharmapuri	58	Pennagaram	G. K. Mani	APMK	None	Aligned with S. Ramadoss-led PMK in 2025
Dharmapuri	59	Dharmapuri	S. P. Venkateshwaran	PMK	NDA	
Dharmapuri	60	Pappireddippatti	A. Govindasamy	AIADMK	NDA	
Dharmapuri	61	Harur (SC)	V. Sampathkumar	AIADMK	NDA	
Tiruvannamalai	62	Chengam (SC)	M. P. Giri	DMK	SPA	
Tiruvannamalai	63	Tiruvannamalai	E. V. Velu	DMK	SPA	
Tiruvannamalai	64	Kilpennathur	K. Pitchandi	DMK	SPA	Deputy Speaker
Tiruvannamalai	65	Kalasapakkam	P. S. T. Saravanan	DMK	SPA	
Tiruvannamalai	66	Polur	S. S. Krishnamoorthy	AIADMK	NDA	
Tiruvannamalai	67	Arani	Sevvoor S. Ramachandran	AIADMK	NDA	
Tiruvannamalai	68	Cheyyar	O. Jothi	DMK	SPA	
Tiruvannamalai	69	Vandavasi (SC)	S. Ambeth Kumar	DMK	SPA	
Viluppuram	70	Gingee	K. S. Masthan	DMK	SPA	
Viluppuram	71	Mailam	C. Sivakumar	PMK	NDA	
Viluppuram	72	Tindivanam (SC)	P. Arjunan	AIADMK	NDA	
Viluppuram	73	Vanur (SC)	M. Chakrapani	AIADMK	NDA	
Viluppuram	74	Villupuram	R. Lakshmanan	DMK	SPA	
Viluppuram	75	Vikravandi	N. Pugazhenthi	DMK	SPA	Died on 6 April 2024
Viluppuram	75	Vikravandi	Anniyur Siva	DMK	SPA	Won in 2024 bypoll
Viluppuram	76	Tirukkoyilur	K. Ponmudy	DMK	SPA	
Kallakurichi	77	Ulundurpettai	A. J. Manikannan	DMK	SPA	
Kallakurichi	78	Rishivandiyam	Vasantham K. Karthikeyan	DMK	SPA	
Kallakurichi	79	Sankarapuram	T. Udhayasuriyan	DMK	SPA	
Kallakurichi	80	Kallakurichi (SC)	M. Senthilkumar	AIADMK	NDA	
Salem	81	Gangavalli (SC)	A. Nallathambi	AIADMK	NDA	
Salem	82	Attur (SC)	A. P. Jayasankaran	AIADMK	NDA	
Salem	83	Yercaud (ST)	G. Chitra	AIADMK	NDA	
Salem	84	Omalur	R. Mani	AIADMK	NDA	
Salem	85	Mettur	S. Sadhasivam	PMK	NDA	
Salem	86	Edappadi	Edappadi K. Palaniswami	AIADMK	NDA	Leader of the Opposition
Salem	87	Sankari	S. Sundararajan	AIADMK	NDA	
Salem	88	Salem (West)	R. Arul	PMK	NDA	
Salem	88	Salem (West)	R. Arul	APMK	None	Aligned with S. Ramadoss-led PMK in 2025
Salem	89	Salem (North)	R. Rajendran	DMK	SPA	
Salem	90	Salem (South)	E. Balasubramanian	AIADMK	NDA	
Salem	91	Veerapandi	M. Rajamuthu	AIADMK	NDA	
Namakkal	92	Rasipuram (SC)	M. Mathiventhan	DMK	SPA	
Namakkal	93	Senthamangalam (ST)	K. Ponnusamy	DMK	SPA	
Namakkal	93	Senthamangalam (ST)	Vacant			Died on 23 October 2025
Namakkal	94	Namakkal	P. Ramalingam	DMK	SPA	
Namakkal	95	Paramathi-Velur	S. Sekar	AIADMK	NDA	
Namakkal	96	Tiruchengodu	E. R. Eswaran	DMK	SPA	
Namakkal	97	Kumarapalayam	P. Thangamani	AIADMK	NDA	
Erode	98	Erode (East)	Thirumagan Evera	INC	SPA	Died on 4 January 2023
Erode	98	Erode (East)	E. V. K. S. Elangovan	INC	SPA	Won in 2023 bypoll. Died on 14 December 2024
Erode	98	Erode (East)	V. C. Chandhirakumar	DMK	SPA	Won in 2025 bypoll
Erode	99	Erode (West)	S. Muthusamy	DMK	SPA	
Erode	100	Modakkurichi	C. Saraswathi	BJP	NDA	
Tiruppur	101	Dharapuram (SC)	N. Kayalvizhi	DMK	SPA	
Tiruppur	102	Kangayam	M. P. Saminathan	DMK	SPA	
Erode	103	Perundurai	S. Jayakumar	AIADMK	NDA	
Erode	104	Bhavani	K. C. Karuppannan	AIADMK	NDA	
Erode	105	Anthiyur	A. G. Venkatachalam	DMK	SPA	
Erode	106	Gobichettipalayam	K. A. Sengottaiyan	AIADMK	NDA	
Erode	106	Gobichettipalayam	K. A. Sengottaiyan	Independent	None	Expelled from AIADMK
Erode	106	Gobichettipalayam	Vacant			Resigned on 26 November 2025
Erode	107	Bhavanisagar (SC)	A. Bannari	AIADMK	NDA	
Nilgiris	108	Udhagamandalam	R. Ganesh	INC	SPA	
Nilgiris	109	Gudalur (SC)	Pon. Jayaseelan	AIADMK	NDA	
Nilgiris	110	Coonoor	K. Ramachandran	DMK	SPA	
Coimbatore	111	Mettupalayam	A. K. Selvaraj	AIADMK	NDA	
Tiruppur	112	Avanashi (SC)	P. Dhanapal	AIADMK	NDA	
Tiruppur	113	Tiruppur (North)	K. N. Vijayakumar	AIADMK	NDA	
Tiruppur	114	Tiruppur (South)	K. Selvaraj	DMK	SPA	
Tiruppur	115	Palladam	M. S. M. Anandan	AIADMK	NDA	
Coimbatore	116	Sulur	V. P. Kandasamy	AIADMK	NDA	
Coimbatore	117	Kavundampalayam	P. R. G. Arunkumar	AIADMK	NDA	
Coimbatore	118	Coimbatore (North)	Amman K. Arjunan	AIADMK	NDA	
Coimbatore	119	Thondamuthur	S. P. Velumani	AIADMK	NDA	Chief Whip of the Opposition
Coimbatore	120	Coimbatore (South)	Vanathi Srinivasan	BJP	NDA	
Coimbatore	121	Singanallur	K. R. Jayaram	AIADMK	NDA	
Coimbatore	122	Kinathukadavu	S. Damodaran	AIADMK	NDA	
Coimbatore	123	Pollachi	Pollachi V. Jayaraman	AIADMK	NDA	
Coimbatore	124	Valparai (SC)	T. K. Amulkandasami	AIADMK	NDA	
Coimbatore	124	Valparai (SC)	Vacant			Died on 21 June 2025
Tiruppur	125	Udumalaipettai	Udumalai K. Radhakrishnan	AIADMK	NDA	
Tiruppur	126	Madathukulam	C. Mahendran	AIADMK	NDA	
Dindigul	127	Palani	I. P. Senthil Kumar	DMK	SPA	
Dindigul	128	Oddanchatram	R. Sakkarapani	DMK	SPA	
Dindigul	129	Athoor	I. Periyasamy	DMK	SPA	
Dindigul	130	Nilakottai (SC)	S. Thenmozhi	AIADMK	NDA	
Dindigul	131	Natham	Natham R. Viswanathan	AIADMK	NDA	
Dindigul	132	Dindigul	Dindigul C. Sreenivaasan	AIADMK	NDA	
Dindigul	133	Vedasandur	S. Gandhirajan	DMK	SPA	
Karur	134	Aravakurichi	Monjanoor R. Elango	DMK	SPA	
Karur	135	Karur	V. Senthilbalaji	DMK	SPA	
Karur	136	Krishnarayapuram (SC)	K. Sivagama Sundari	DMK	SPA	
Karur	137	Kulithalai	R. Manickam	DMK	SPA	
Tiruchirappalli	138	Manapparai	P. Abdul Samad	DMK	SPA	
Tiruchirappalli	139	Srirangam	M. Palaniyandi	DMK	SPA	
Tiruchirappalli	140	Tiruchirappalli (West)	K. N. Nehru	DMK	SPA	Deputy Leader of the House
Tiruchirappalli	141	Tiruchirappalli (East)	Inigo S. Irudayaraj	DMK	SPA	
Tiruchirappalli	142	Thiruverumbur	Anbil Mahesh Poyyamozhi	DMK	SPA	
Tiruchirappalli	143	Lalgudi	A. Soundara Pandian	DMK	SPA	
Tiruchirappalli	144	Manachanallur	S. Kathiravan	DMK	SPA	
Tiruchirappalli	145	Musiri	N. Thiyagarajan	DMK	SPA	
Tiruchirappalli	146	Thuraiyur (SC)	S. Stalin Kumar	DMK	SPA	
Perambalur	147	Perambalur (SC)	M. Prabhakaran	DMK	SPA	
Perambalur	148	Kunnam	S. S. Sivasankar	DMK	SPA	
Ariyalur	149	Ariyalur	K. Chinnappa	MDMK	SPA	
Ariyalur	150	Jayankondam	Ka. So. Ka. Kannan	DMK	SPA	
Cuddalore	151	Tittakudi (SC)	C. V. Ganesan	DMK	SPA	
Cuddalore	152	Vriddhachalam	R. Radhakrishnan	INC	SPA	
Cuddalore	153	Neyveli	Saba Rajendran	DMK	SPA	
Cuddalore	154	Panruti	T. Velmurugan	DMK	SPA	
Cuddalore	155	Cuddalore	G. Iyappan	DMK	SPA	
Cuddalore	156	Kurinjipadi	M. R. K. Panneerselvam	DMK	SPA	
Cuddalore	157	Bhuvanagiri	A. Arunmozhithevan	AIADMK	NDA	
Cuddalore	158	Chidambaram	K. A. Pandian	AIADMK	NDA	
Cuddalore	159	Kattumannarkoil (SC)	M. Sinthanai Selvan	VCK	SPA	
Mayiladuthurai	160	Sirkazhi (SC)	M. Panneerselvam	DMK	SPA	
Mayiladuthurai	161	Mayiladuthurai	S. Rajakumar	INC	SPA	
Mayiladuthurai	162	Poompuhar	Nivedha M. Murugan	DMK	SPA	
Nagapattinam	163	Nagapattinam	Aloor Shanavas	VCK	SPA	
Nagapattinam	164	Kilvelur (SC)	V. P. Nagaimaali	CPI(M)	SPA	
Nagapattinam	165	Vedaranyam	O. S. Manian	AIADMK	NDA	
Tiruvarur	166	Thiruthuraipoondi (SC)	K. Marimuthu	CPI	SPA	
Tiruvarur	167	Mannargudi	Dr. T. R. B. Rajaa	DMK	SPA	
Tiruvarur	168	Thiruvarur	K. Poondi Kalaivanan	DMK	SPA	
Tiruvarur	169	Nannilam	R. Kamaraj	AIADMK	NDA	
Thanjavur	170	Thiruvidaimarudur (SC)	Go. Vi. Chezhiyan	DMK	SPA	Chief Whip of the Government
Thanjavur	171	Kumbakonam	G. Anbazhagan	DMK	SPA	
Thanjavur	172	Papanasam	Dr. M. H. Jawahirullah	DMK	SPA	
Thanjavur	173	Thiruvaiyaru	Durai Chandrasekaran	DMK	SPA	
Thanjavur	174	Thanjavur	T. K. G. Neelamegam	DMK	SPA	
Thanjavur	175	Orathanadu	R. Vaithilingam	AIADMK	NDA	
Thanjavur	175	Orathanadu	R. Vaithilingam	Independent	None	Expelled from AIADMK
Thanjavur	175	Orathanadu	Vacant			Resigned on 21 January 2026
Thanjavur	176	Pattukkottai	K. Annadurai	DMK	SPA	
Thanjavur	177	Peravurani	N. Ashok Kumar	DMK	SPA	
Pudukkottai	178	Gandarvakkottai (SC)	M. Chinnadurai	CPI(M)	SPA	
Pudukkottai	179	Viralimalai	C. Vijayabaskar	AIADMK	NDA	
Pudukkottai	180	Pudukkottai	Dr. V. Muthuraja	DMK	SPA	
Pudukkottai	181	Thirumayam	S. Ragupathi	DMK	SPA	
Pudukkottai	182	Alangudi	Meyyanathan Siva V	DMK	SPA	
Pudukkottai	183	Aranthangi	T. Ramachandran	INC	SPA	
Sivaganga	184	Karaikudi	S. Mangudi	INC	SPA	
Sivaganga	185	Tiruppattur	K. R. Periyakaruppan	DMK	SPA	
Sivaganga	186	Sivaganga	P. R. Senthilnathan	AIADMK	NDA	
Sivaganga	187	Manamadurai (SC)	A. Tamilarasi	DMK	SPA	
Madurai	188	Melur	P. Selvam	AIADMK	NDA	
Madurai	189	Madurai East	P. Moorthy	DMK	SPA	
Madurai	190	Sholavandan (SC)	A. Venkatesan	DMK	SPA	
Madurai	191	Madurai North	G. Thalapathi	DMK	SPA	
Madurai	192	Madurai South	M. Boominathan	MDMK	SPA	
Madurai	193	Madurai Central	Palanivel Thiagarajan	DMK	SPA	
Madurai	194	Madurai West	Sellur K. Raju	AIADMK	NDA	
Madurai	195	Thiruparankundram	V. V. Rajan Chellappa	AIADMK	NDA	
Madurai	196	Thirumangalam	R. B. Udhayakumar	AIADMK	NDA	Deputy Leader of Opposition
Madurai	197	Usilampatti	P. Ayyappan	AIADMK	NDA	-
Madurai	197	Usilampatti	P. Ayyappan	Independent	None	Resigned from AIADMK
Madurai	197	Usilampatti	Vacant			Resigned after joining DMK on 27 February 2026
Theni	198	Andipatti	A. Maharajan	DMK	SPA	
Theni	199	Periyakulam (SC)	K. S. Saravana Kumar	DMK	SPA	
Theni	200	Bodinayakanur	O. Panneerselvam	AIADMK	NDA	
Theni	200	Bodinayakanur	O. Panneerselvam	Independent	None	Expelled from AIADMK
Theni	200	Bodinayakanur	Vacant			Resigned after joining DMK on 27 February 2026
Theni	201	Cumbum	N. Eramakrishnan	DMK	SPA	
Virudhunagar	202	Rajapalayam	S. Thangappandian	DMK	SPA	
Virudhunagar	203	Srivilliputhur (SC)	E. M. Manraj	AIADMK	NDA	
Virudhunagar	204	Sattur	A. R. R. Raghumaran	MDMK	SPA	
Virudhunagar	205	Sivakasi	A. M. S. G. Ashokan	INC	SPA	
Virudhunagar	206	Virudhunagar	A. R. R. Seenivasan	DMK	SPA	
Virudhunagar	207	Aruppukkottai	K. K. S. S. R. Ramachandran	DMK	SPA	
Virudhunagar	208	Tiruchuli	Thangam Thennarasu	DMK	SPA	
Ramanathapuram	209	Paramakudi (SC)	S. Murugesan	DMK	SPA	
Ramanathapuram	210	Tiruvadanai	R. M. Karumanickam	INC	SPA	
Ramanathapuram	211	Ramanathapuram	Katharbatcha Muthuramalingam	DMK	SPA	
Ramanathapuram	212	Mudhukulathur	R. S. Raja Kannappan	DMK	SPA	
Thoothukudi	213	Vilathikulam	G. V. Markandayan	DMK	SPA	
Thoothukudi	214	Thoothukkudi	P. Geetha Jeevan	DMK	SPA	
Thoothukudi	215	Tiruchendur	Anitha Radhakrishnan	DMK	SPA	
Thoothukudi	216	Srivaikuntam	Oorvasi S. Amirtharaj	INC	SPA	
Thoothukudi	217	Ottapidaram (SC)	M. C. Shunmugaiah	DMK	SPA	
Thoothukudi	218	Kovilpatti	Kadambur C. Raju	AIADMK	NDA	
Tenkasi	219	Sankarankovil (SC)	E. Raja	DMK	SPA	
Tenkasi	220	Vasudevanallur (SC)	T. Sadhan Tirumalaikumar	MDMK	SPA	
Tenkasi	221	Kadayanallur	C. Krishnamurali	AIADMK	NDA	
Tenkasi	222	Tenkasi	S. Palani Nadar	INC	SPA	
Tenkasi	223	Alangulam	P. H. Manoj Pandian	AIADMK	NDA	
Tenkasi	223	Alangulam	P. H. Manoj Pandian	Independent	None	Expelled from AIADMK
Tenkasi	223	Alangulam	Vacant			Resigned on 4 November 2025
Tirunelveli	224	Tirunelveli	Nainar Nagendran	BJP	NDA	
Tirunelveli	225	Ambasamudram	E. Subaya	AIADMK	NDA	
Tirunelveli	226	Palayamkottai	M. Abdul Wahab	DMK	SPA	
Tirunelveli	227	Nanguneri	Ruby R. Manoharan	INC	SPA	
Tirunelveli	228	Radhapuram	M. Appavu	DMK	SPA	Speaker
Kanyakumari	229	Kanniyakumari	N. Thalavai Sundaram	AIADMK	NDA	
Kanyakumari	230	Nagercoil	M. R. Gandhi	BJP	NDA	
Kanyakumari	231	Colachal	Prince J.G.	INC	SPA	
Kanyakumari	232	Padmanabhapuram	Mano Thangaraj	DMK	SPA	
Kanyakumari	233	Vilavancode	S. Vijayadharani	INC	SPA	Resigned on 24 Feb 2024
Kanyakumari	233	Vilavancode	Tharahai Cuthbert	INC	SPA	Won in 2024 bypoll
Kanyakumari	234	Killiyoor	S. Rajeshkumar	INC	SPA	

== Committees ==
=== 2024-2026 ===
Constituted on 29th June, 2024 and Extended upto 31st March 2026.

Committee	Chairperson	Party
Business Advisory Committee	M. Appavu	DMK
Committee on Rules	M. Appavu	DMK
Committee on Privileges	K. Pitchandi	DMK
Committee on Estimates	S. Gandhirajan	DMK
Committee on Public Accounts	K. Selvaperunthagai	INC
Committee on Public Undertakings	A. P. Nandakumar	DMK
Committee on Delegated Legislation	G. V. Markandayan	DMK
Committee on Government Assurances	T. Velmurugan	DMK
House Committee	I. Paranthamen	DMK
Committee on Petitions	K. Ramachandran	DMK
Library Committee	J. L. Eswarappan	DMK
Committee on Papers Laid on the Table of the House	R. Lakshmanan	DMK

Business Advisory Committee (2024–26)
Sr. No.	Name	Post	Party
1	M. Appavu	Chairperson	DMK
2	M. K. Stalin	Member	DMK
3	Durai Murugan	Member	DMK
4	K. N. Nehru	Member	DMK
5	I. Periyasamy	Member	DMK
6	E. V. Velu	Member	DMK
7	K. Pitchandi	Member	DMK
8	K. Ramachandran	Member	DMK
9	Edappadi K. Palaniswami	Member	AIADMK
10	R. B. Udhayakumar	Member	AIADMK
11	S. P. Velumani	Member	AIADMK
12	S. Rajesh Kumar	Member	INC
13	G. K. Mani	Member	PMK(R)
14	Nainar Nagenthran	Member	BJP
15	M. Sinthanai Selvan	Member	VCK
16	V. P. Nagaimaali	Member	CPI(M)
17	T. Ramachandran	Member	INC

Committee on Rules (2024–26)
Sr. No.	Name	Post	Party
1	M. Appavu	Chairperson	DMK
2	M. K. Stalin	Member	DMK
3	Durai Murugan	Member	DMK
4	K. Pitchandi	Member	DMK
5	Edappadi K. Palaniswami	Member	AIADMK
6	Anniyur Siva @ A. Sivashanmugam	Member	DMK
7	K. S. Saravanakumar	Member	AIADMK
8	S. Thangapandian	Member	DMK
9	C. Krishnamurali	Member	AIADMK
10	G. Sendhil Kumar	Member	AIADMK
11	A. K. Selvaraj	Member	AIADMK
12	Oorvasi S. Amirtharaj	Member	INC
13	C. Sivakumar	Member	PMK
14	Vanathi Srinivasan	Member	BJP
15	M. Sinthanai Selvan	Member	VCK
16	V. P. Nagaimaali	Member	CPI(M)
17	T. Ramachandran	Member	CPI

Committee on Privileges (2024–26)
Sr. No.	Name	Post	Party
1	K. Pitchandi	Chairperson	DMK
2	Durai Murugan	Member	DMK
3	Edappadi K. Palaniswami	Member	AIADMK
4	N. Ashokkumar	Member	DMK
5	K. Annadurai	Member	DMK
6	M. Abdul Wahab	Member	DMK
7	N. Eramakrishnan	Member	DMK
8	Inigo S. Irudayaraj	Member	DMK
9	K. Karthikeyan	Member	DMK
10	R. Manickam	Member	DMK
11	M. Varalakshmi	Member	DMK
12	A. Arunmozhithevan	Member	AIADMK
13	N. Thalavai Sundaram	Member	AIADMK
14	Dr. Pollachi V. Jayaraman	Member	AIADMK
15	J. G. Prince	Member	INC
16	S. Sadhasivam	Member	PMK
17	K. Marimuthu	Member	CPI

Committee on Estimates (2024–26)
Sr. No.	Name	Post	Party
1	S. Gandhirajan	Chairperson	DMK
2	Thangam Thenarasu	Member	DMK
3	K. Selvaperunthagai	Member	INC
4	A. P. Nandakumar	Member	DMK
5	S. Ambethkumar	Member	DMK
6	T. Udhayasuriyan	Member	DMK
7	Katharbatcha Muthuramalingam	Member	DMK
8	T. Sadhan Thirumalaikumar	Member	DMK
9	S. Sudharsanam	Member	DMK
10	M. Panneerselvam	Member	DMK
11	E. Raja	Member	DMK
12	P. R. G. Arunkumar	Member	AIADMK
19	Sellur K. Raju	Member	AIADMK
13	Sevvoor S. Ramachandran	Member	AIADMK
16	O. S. Manian	Member	AIADMK
18	R. M. Karumanikam	Member	INC
14	S. P. Venkateshwaran	Member	PMK
17	S. S. Balaji	Member	VCK
15	M. Chinnadurai	Member	CPI(M)

Committee on Public Accounts (2024–26)
Sr. No.	Name	Post	Party
1	K. Selvaperunthagai	Chairperson	INC
2	Thangam Thenarasu	Member	DMK
3	S. Gandhirajan	Member	DMK
4	A. P. Nandakumar	Member	DMK
5	P. Abdul Samad	Member	DMK
6	C. V. M. P. Ezhilarasan	Member	DMK
7	G. Iyappan	Member	DMK
8	S. Chandran	Member	DMK
9	P. Sivakumar (a) Thayagamkavi	Member	DMK
10	I. P. Senthil Kumar	Member	DMK
11	R. D. Shekar	Member	DMK
12	M. Palaniyandi	Member	DMK
13	Agri S. S. Krishnamoorthy	Member	AIADMK
14	S. Sekar	Member	AIADMK
15	Natham R. Viswanathan	Member	AIADMK
16	K. R. Jayaram	Member	AIADMK
17	Dr. C. Saraswathi	Member	BJP
18	J. Mohamed Shanavas	Member	VCK
19	T. Ramachandran	Member	CPI

Committee on Public Undertakings (2024–26)
Sr. No.	Name	Post	Party
1	A. P. Nandakumar	Chairperson	DMK
2	S. Gandhirajan	Member	DMK
3	K. Selvaperunthagai	Member	INC
4	G. Anbalagan	Member	DMK
5	E. R. Eswaran	Member	DMK
7	M. P. Giri	Member	DMK
8	Durai. Chandrasekaran	Member	DMK
10	Y. Prakaash	Member	DMK
11	Dha. Velu	Member	DMK
12	M. H. Jawahirullah	Member	DMK
6	M. S. M. Anandan	Member	AIADMK
9	Udumalai K. Radhakrishnan	Member	AIADMK
16	Kadambur C. Raju	Member	AIADMK
18	A. Govindasamy	Member	AIADMK
14	C. Vijaya Basker	Member	AIADMK
17	G. Ashokan	Member	INC
15	M. Sinthanai Selvan	Member	VCK
13	V. P. Nagaimaali	Member	CPI(M)

Committee on Delegated Legislation (2024–26)
Sr. No.	Name	Post	Party
1	G. V. Markandayan	Chairperson	DMK
2	S. R. Raja	Member	DMK
3	Ka. So. Ka. Kannan	Member	DMK
4	A. Krishnaswamy	Member	DMK
5	N. Thiyagarajan	Member	DMK
6	A. R. R. Raghuraman	Member	DMK
7	S. Stalinkumar	Member	DMK
8	P. Arjunan	Member	AIADMK
9	P. R. Senthilnathan	Member	AIADMK
10	E. Balasubramanian	Member	AIADMK
11	E. M. Manraj	Member	AIADMK
12	Tharahai Cuthbert	Member	INC

Committee on Government Assurances (2024–26)
Sr. No.	Name	Post	Party
1	T. Velmurugan	Chairperson	DMK
2	S. Aravindramesh	Member	DMK
3	A. R. R. Seenivasan	Member	DMK
4	G. Thalapathi	Member	DMK
5	A. Nallathambi	Member	DMK
6	M. Boominathan	Member	DMK
7	M. K. Mohan	Member	DMK
8	M. Chakrapani	Member	AIADMK
9	R. Mani	Member	AIADMK
10	S. Jayakumar	Member	AIADMK
11	S. Mangudi	Member	INC
12	R. Arul	Member	PMK(R)

House Committee (2024–26)
Sr. No.	Name	Post	Party
1	I. Paranthamen	Chairperson	DMK
2	V. Amulu	Member	DMK
3	K. Ganapathy	Member	DMK
4	I. Karunanithi	Member	DMK
5	J. Karunanithi	Member	DMK
6	P. S. T. Saravanan	Member	DMK
7	K. Sivagama Sundari	Member	DMK
8	Nivedha M. Murugan	Member	DMK
9	K. Ponnusamy (died on 23 October 2025)	Member	DMK
10	S. Murugesan	Member	DMK
11	P. Ramalingam	Member	DMK
12	M. Senthilkumar	Member	AIADMK
13	T. M. Tamilselvam	Member	AIADMK
14	A. Nallathambi	Member	AIADMK
15	A. Bannari	Member	AIADMK
16	M. Rajamuthu	Member	AIADMK
17	Pon. Jayaseelan	Member	AIADMK
18	S. Rajakumar	Member	INC

Committee on Petitions (2024–26)
Sr. No.	Name	Post	Party
1	K. Ramachandran	Chairperson	DMK
2	K. P. Shankar	Member	DMK
3	K. Chinnappa	Member	DMK
4	A. Soundarapandian	Member	DMK
5	D. Mathiazhagan	Member	DMK
6	O. Jothi	Member	DMK
7	V. P. Kandasamy	Member	AIADMK
8	S. Sundararajan	Member	AIADMK
9	M. Jagan Moorthy	Member	AIADMK
10	T. Ramachandran	Member	INC
11	M. Babu	Member	VCK

Library Committee (2024–26)
Sr. No.	Name	Post	Party
1	J. L. Eswarappan	Chairperson	DMK
2	P. Karthikeyan	Member	DMK
3	T. J. Govindrajan	Member	DMK
4	A. Tamilarasi	Member	DMK
5	A. M. V. Prabhakara Raja	Member	DMK
6	A. Maharajan	Member	DMK
7	V. Sampathkumar	Member	AIADMK
8	K. Maragatham	Member	AIADMK
9	A. P. Jayasankaran	Member	AIADMK
10	R. Radhakrishnan	Member	INC

Committee on Papers Laid on the Table of the House (2024–26)
Sr. No.	Name	Post	Party
1	R. Lakshmanan	Chairperson	DMK
2	J. John Ebenezer	Member	DMK
3	S. Kathiravan	Member	DMK
4	K. Devaraji	Member	DMK
5	V. Muthuraja	Member	DMK
6	A. C. Vilwanathan	Member	DMK
7	K. Ashokkumar	Member	AIADMK
8	T. K. Amulkandasami (died on 21 June 2025)	Member	AIADMK
9	G. Chitra	Member	AIADMK
10	K. A. Pandian	Member	AIADMK
11	Durai. Chandrasekar	Member	INC

== See also ==
- Government of Tamil Nadu
- List of chief ministers of Tamil Nadu
- Legislative assembly of Tamil Nadu
