= M. K. Stalin ministry =

Government of Tamil Nadu 2021-2026

- 21st Cabinet of Tamil Nadu
- 2021–2026
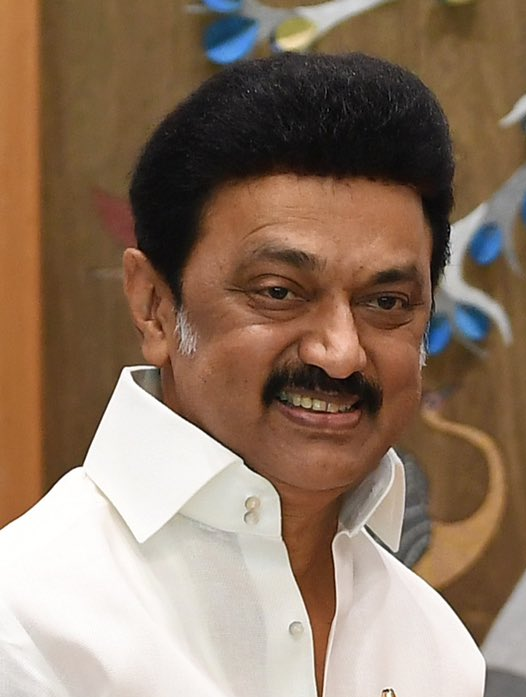
- Date formed: 7 May 2021
- Date dissolved: 9 May 2026

People and organisations
- Governor: Banwarilal Purohit (till 18 September 2021); R. N. Ravi (From 18 September 2021 till 12 March 2026); Rajendra Vishwanath Arlekar (since 12 March 2026)
- Chief Minister: M. K. Stalin (DMK)
- Deputy Chief Minister: Udhayanidhi Stalin (DMK)
- No. of ministers: 35
- Total no. of members: 133
- Member parties: Dravida Munnetra Kazhagam
- Status in legislature: Majority
- Opposition party: AIADMK
- Opposition leader: Edappadi K. Palaniswami (since 11 May 2021)

History
- Election: 2021
- Outgoing election: 2026
- Legislature term: 2021–2026
- Predecessor: Palaniswami ministry
- Successor: C. Joseph Vijay ministry

M. K. Stalin ministry was the Council of Ministers headed by M. K. Stalin, who was sworn in as the 21st Chief Minister of Tamil Nadu after the 2021 Tamil Nadu Legislative Assembly elections. The 16th Tamil Nadu Assembly was formed after the elections, and the council assumed office on 7 May 2021.

== Council of Ministers ==
Sr. No.	Name	Constituency	Portfolio(s)	Party	Term of office	
Sr. No.	Name	Constituency	Portfolio(s)	Party	Took office	Duration
Chief Minister
1	M. K. Stalin	Kolathur	Public, General Administration, Indian Administrative Service, Indian Police Service, Indian Forest Service, other All India Service, District Revenue Officers, Police, Home, and Welfare of Differently abled persons	DMK	7 May 2021	5 years and 2 days
Deputy Chief Minister
2	Udhayanidhi Stalin	Chepauk-Thiruvallikeni	Youth Welfare, Sports Development, Special Programme Implementation Department & Poverty Alleviation Programme and Rural Indebtedness, Planning, Development and Special Initiatives	DMK	14 December 2022	3 years, 4 months and 25 days
Cabinet Ministers
3	Durai Murugan	Katpadi	Irrigation Projects including Small Irrigation, Legislative Assembly, Governor and Ministry, Elections and Passports, Law	DMK	7 May 2021	5 years and 2 days
4	K. N. Nehru	Tiruchirappalli West	Municipal Administration, Urban and Water Supply	DMK	7 May 2021	5 years and 2 days
5	I. Periyasamy	Athoor	Rural Development, Panchayats and Panchayat Union	DMK	7 May 2021	5 years and 2 days
6	E. V. Velu	Tiruvannamalai	Public Works (Buildings), Highways and Minor Ports	DMK	7 May 2021	5 years and 2 days
7	M. R. K. Panneerselvam	Kurinjipadi	Agriculture, Agricultural Engineering, Agro Service Co-operatives, Horticulture, Sugarcane Excise, Sugarcane Development and Waste Land Development	DMK	7 May 2021	5 years and 2 days
8	K. K. S. S. R. Ramachandran	Aruppukottai	Revenue, District Revenue Establishment, Deputy Collectors, Disaster Management	DMK	7 May 2021	5 years and 2 days
9	Thangam Thennarasu	Tiruchuli	Finance, Statistics, Archaeology, Environment and Climate Change	DMK	7 May 2021	5 years and 2 days
10	S. Regupathy	Tirumayam	Courts, Prisons, Prevention of Corruption and Minerals And Mines	DMK	7 May 2021	5 years and 2 days
11	S. Muthusamy	Erode West	Housing, Rural Housing, Town Planning Projects and Housing Development, Accommodation Control, Urban Planning, Urban Development, Prohibition and Excise, Molasses	DMK	7 May 2021	5 years and 2 days
12	K. R. Periyakaruppan	Tiruppattur	Co-operation	DMK	7 May 2021	5 years and 2 days
13	T. M. Anbarasan	Alandur	Rural Industries including Cottage Industries, Small Industries, Tamil Nadu Urban Habitat Development Board	DMK	7 May 2021	5 years and 2 days
14	M. P. Saminathan	Kangayam	Tamil Official Language and Tamil Culture, Information & Publicity, Film Technology and Cinematograph Act, Newsprint Control, Stationery and Printing, Government Press	DMK	7 May 2021	5 years and 2 days
15	P. Geetha Jeevan	Thoothukkudi	Social Welfare including Women and Children Welfare, Orphanages and Correctional Administration, Integrated Child Development Scheme and Beggar Homes and Social Reforms & Nutritious Meal Programme	DMK	7 May 2021	5 years and 2 days
16	Anitha R. Radhakrishnan	Tiruchendur	Fisheries, Fisheries Development Corporation and Animal Husbandry	DMK	7 May 2021	5 years and 2 days
17	Raja Kannappan	Mudukulathur	Forests, Khadi and Village Industries Board	DMK	7 May 2021	5 years and 2 days
18	R. Rajendran	Salem North	Tourism and Tourism Development Corporation	DMK	28 September 2024	1 year, 7 months and 11 days
19	R. Sakkarapani	Oddanchatram	Food and Civil Supplies, Consumer Protection and Price Control	DMK	7 May 2021	5 years and 2 days
20	R. Gandhi	Ranipet	Handlooms and Textiles, Boodhan and Gramadhan	DMK	7 May 2021	5 years and 2 days
21	Ma. Subramanian	Saidapet	Health, Medical Education and Family Welfare	DMK	7 May 2021	5 years and 2 days
22	P. Moorthy	Madurai East	Commercial Taxes, Registration and Stamp Act, Weights and Measures, Debt Relief including legislation on Money lending, Chits and Registration of Companies	DMK	7 May 2021	5 years and 2 days
23	S. S. Sivasankar	Kunnam	Transport, Nationalized Transport and Motor Vehicles Act, Electricity, Non-Conventional Energy Development	DMK	7 May 2021	5 years and 2 days
24	P. K. Sekar Babu	Harbour	Hindu Religious and Charitable Endowments, CMDA	DMK	7 May 2021	5 years and 2 days
25	Govi. Chezhian	Thiruvidamarudur	Higher Education including Technical Education, Electronics, Science and Technology	DMK	28 September 2024	1 year, 7 months and 11 days
26	Palanivel Thiagarajan	Madurai Central	Information Technology & Digital Services	DMK	7 May 2021	5 years and 2 days
27	S. M. Nasar	Avadi	Minorities Welfare, Non-Resident Tamils, Refugees & Evacuees and Wakf Board	DMK	28 September 2024	1 year, 7 months and 11 days
28	Anbil Mahesh Poyyamozhi	Thiruverumbur	School Education	DMK	7 May 2021	5 years and 2 days
29	Siva V. Meyyanathan	Alangudi	Backward Classes Welfare, Most Backward Classes Welfare and De-notified Communities Welfare	DMK	7 May 2021	5 years and 2 days
30	C. V. Ganesan	Tittakudi	Labour Welfare, Population, Employment and Training, Census, Urban and Rural Employment	DMK	7 May 2021	5 years and 2 days
31	Mano Thangaraj	Padmanabhapuram	Milk and Dairy Development	DMK	28 April 2025	1 year and 11 days
32	T.R.B.Rajaa	Mannargudi	Industries	DMK	7 May 2021	5 years and 2 days
33	M. Mathiventhan	Rasipuram	Adi Dravidar Welfare, Hill Tribes and Bonded Labour Welfare	DMK	7 May 2021	5 years and 2 days
34	N. Kayalvizhi	Dharapuram	Human Resources Management, Pensions and Pensionary benefits, Ex-Servicemen	DMK	7 May 2021	5 years and 2 days

== Cabinet Reshuffles ==
=== 29 March 2022 ===
Name	Existing Portfolios	Proposed Portfolios
Raja Kannappan	Transport, Nationalized Transport, Motor Vehicles Act	Backward Classes Welfare, Most Backward Classes Welfare, De-notified Communities Welfare
S. S. Sivasankar	Backward Classes Welfare, Most Backward Classes Welfare, De-notified Communities Welfare	Transport, Nationalized Transport, Motor Vehicles Act

=== 14 December 2022 ===
Name	Existing Portfolios	Proposed Portfolios
I. Periyasamy	Co-operation	Rural Development, Panchayats, Panchayat Union
K. R. Periyakaruppan	Rural Development, Panchayats, Panchayat Union	Cooperation
K. Ramachandran	Forests	Tourism, Tourism Development Corporation
M. Mathiventhan	Tourism and Tourism Development Corporation	Forests
Meyyanathan Siva V	Environment and Pollution Control, Youth Welfare and Sports Development	Environment and Pollution Control, Ex-Servicemen Welfare
P. K. Sekar Babu	Hindu Religious and Charitable Endowments	Hindu Religious and Charitable Endowments, CMDA
Palanivel Thiagarajan	Finance, Planning, Human Resources Management, Pensions and Pensionary benefits	Finance, Planning, Human Resources Management, Pensions and Pensionary benefits, Statistics
R. Gandhi	Handlooms and Textiles, Khadi & Village Industries Board	Handlooms and Textiles, Boodhan and Gramadhan
Raja Kannappan	Backward Classes Welfare, Most Backward Classes Welfare, De-notified Communities Welfare	Backward Classes Welfare, Most Backward Classes Welfare, De-notified Communities Welfare, Khadi & Village Industries Board
S. Muthusamy	Housing, Rural Housing, Town Planning Projects and Housing Development, Accommodation Control, Urban Planning, Urban Development, CMDA	Housing, Rural Housing, Town Planning Projects and Housing Development, Accommodation Control, Urban Planning, Urban Development
Udhayanidhi Stalin	Inducted	Youth Welfare, Sports Development, Special Programme Implementation Department & Poverty Alleviation Programme and Rural Indebtedness

=== 11 May 2023 ===
Name	Existing Portfolios	Proposed Portfolios
M. P. Saminathan	Information & Publicity, Film Technology and Cinematograph Act, Newsprint Control, Stationery and Printing, Government Press	Tamil Official Language and Tamil Culture, Information & Publicity, Film Technology and Cinematograph Act, Newsprint Control, Stationery and Printing, Government Press
Mano Thangaraj	Information Technology and Digital Services	Milk and Dairy Development
Palanivel Thiagarajan	Finance, Planning, Human Resources Management, Pensions and Pensionary benefits and Statistics	Information Technology and Digital Services
Thangam Thennarasu	Industries, Tamil Language, Tamil Culture, Archeology	Finance, Planning, Human Resources Management, Pensions and Pensionary benefits, Statistics and Archaeology
S. M. Nasar	Milk and Dairy Development	Dropped
T.R.B.Rajaa	Inducted	Industries

=== 16 June 2023 ===
Name	Existing Portfolios	Proposed Portfolios
S. Muthusamy	Housing, Rural Housing, Town Planning Projects and Housing Development, Accommodation Control, Urban Planning, Urban Development	Housing, Rural Housing, Town Planning Projects and Housing Development, Accommodation Control, Urban Planning, Urban Development, Prohibition and Excise, Molasses
Thangam Thennarasu	Finance, Planning, Human Resources Management, Pensions and Pensionary benefits, Statistics and Archaeology	Finance, Planning, Human Resources Management, Pensions and Pensionary benefits, Statistics and Archaeology, Electricity, Non-Conventional Energy Development
V. Senthil Balaji	Electricity and Non-Conventional Energy, Prohibition & Excise, Molasses	No portfolio

=== 21 December 2023 ===
Name	Existing Portfolios	Proposed Portfolios
R. Gandhi	Handlooms and Textiles, Boodhan and Gramadhan	Handlooms and Textiles, Boodhan and Gramadhan, Khadi and Village Industries Board
Raja Kannappan	Backward Classes Welfare, Most Backward Classes Welfare, De-notified Communities Welfare, Khadi and Village Industries Board	Backward Classes Welfare, Most Backward Classes Welfare, De-notified Communities Welfare, Higher Education, Electronics, Science and Technology
K. Ponmudy	Higher Education, Electronics, Science and Technology	Dropped

=== 12 February 2024 ===
Name	Existing Portfolios	Proposed Portfolios
V. Senthil Balaji	No portfolio	Resigned

=== 22 March 2024 ===
Name	Existing Portfolios	Proposed Portfolios
R. Gandhi	Handlooms and Textiles, Boodhan and Gramadhan, Khadi and Village Industries Board	Handlooms and Textiles, Boodhan and Gramadhan
Raja Kannappan	Backward Classes Welfare, Most Backward Classes Welfare, De-notified Communities Welfare, Higher Education, Electronics, Science and Technology	Backward Classes Welfare, Most Backward Classes Welfare, De-notified Communities Welfare, Khadi and Village Industries Board
K. Ponmudy	Inducted	Higher Education, Electronics, Science and Technology

=== 28 September 2024 ===
Name	Existing Portfolios	Proposed Portfolios
Udhayanidhi Stalin	Youth Welfare, Sports Development, Special Programme Implementation Department & Poverty Alleviation Programme and Rural Indebtedness	Deputy Chief Minister; Youth Welfare, Sports Development, Special Programme Implementation Department & Poverty Alleviation Programme and Rural Indebtedness, Planning and Statistics
K. Ponmudy	Higher Education	Forests
M. Mathiventhan	Forests	Adi Dravidar and Tribal Welfare
Meyyanathan Siva V	Environment and Climate Change	Backward Classes Welfare, Most Backward Classes Welfare, De-notified Communities Welfare
N. Kayalvizhi	Adi Dravidar and Tribal Welfare	Human Resources Management and Ex-Servicemen Welfare
Raja Kannappan	Backward Classes Welfare, Most Backward Classes Welfare, De-notified Communities Welfare, Khadi & Village Industries	Milk and Dairy Development and Khadi & Village Industries
Thangam Thennarasu	Finance, Planning, Human Resources Management, Pensions and Pensionary benefits, Statistics and Archaeology, Electricity, Non-Conventional Energy Development	Finance, Human Resources Management, Pensions and Pensionary benefits, Archaeology, Environment and Climate Change
K. Ramachandran	Tourism	Dropped
K. S. Masthan	Minorities Welfare and Non-Resident Tamils Welfare	Dropped
Mano Thangaraj	Milk and Dairy Development	Dropped
Govi. Chezhian	Inducted	Higher Education
R. Rajendran	Inducted	Tourism
S. M. Nasar	Inducted	Minorities Welfare and Non-Resident Tamils Welfare
V. Senthil Balaji	Inducted	Electricity, Non-Conventional Energy Development

=== 13 February 2025 ===
Name	Existing Portfolios	Proposed Portfolios
Raja Kannappan	Milk and Dairy Development and Khadi & Village Industries	Milk and Dairy Development
K. Ponmudy	Forests	Forests, Khadi & Village Industries

=== 27 April 2025 ===
Name	Existing Portfolios	Proposed Portfolios
S. S. Sivasankar	Transport, Nationalized Transport, Motor Vehicles Act	Transport, Nationalized Transport, Motor Vehicles Act, Electricity and Non-Conventional Energy
S. Muthusamy	Housing, Rural Housing, Town Planning Projects and Housing Development, Accommodation Control, Urban Planning, Urban Development	Housing, Rural Housing, Town Planning Projects and Housing Development, Accommodation Control, Urban Planning, Urban Development, Prohibition and Excise, Molasses
Raja Kannappan	Milk and Dairy Development	Forests and Khadi
V. Senthil Balaji	Electricity and Non-Conventional Energy, Prohibition & Excise, Molasses	Resigned
K. Ponmudy	Forests, Khadi & Village Industries	Resigned
Mano Thangaraj	Inducted	Milk and Dairy Development

=== 8 May 2025 ===
Name	Existing Portfolios	Proposed Portfolios
Durai Murugan	Irrigation Projects including Small Irrigation, Legislative Assembly, Governor and Ministry, Elections and Passports, Minerals And Mines	Irrigation Projects including Small Irrigation, Legislative Assembly, Governor and Ministry, Elections and Passports, Law, Courts, Prisons and Prevention of Corruption
S. Regupathy	Law, Courts, Prisons and Prevention of Corruption	Minerals And Mines

== Demographics ==
Ministers by district (Note: Based on the location of the assembly constituency from which the corresponding member was elected from.)
S.No.	District	Ministers	Name
1	Ariyalur		
2	Chengalpattu		
3	Chennai	5	M. K. Stalin (Chief Minister); Udhayanidhi Stalin (Deputy Chief Minister); Ma. Subramanian; P. K. Sekar Babu; T. M. Anbarasan
4	Coimbatore		
5	Cuddalore	2	C. V. Ganesan; M. R. K. Panneerselvam
6	Dharmapuri		
7	Dindigul	2	I. Periyasamy; R. Sakkarapani
8	Erode	1	S. Muthusamy
9	Kallakurichi		
10	Kanchipuram		
11	Kanniyakumari	1	Mano Thangaraj
12	Karur		
13	Krishnagiri		
14	Madurai	2	P. Moorthy; Palanivel Thiagarajan
15	Mayiladuthurai		
16	Nagapattinam		
17	Namakkal	1	M. Mathiventhan
18	Nilgiris		
19	Perambalur	1	S. S. Sivasankar
20	Pudukkottai	2	Meyyanathan Siva V; S. Regupathy
21	Ramanathapuram	1	Raja Kannappan
22	Ranipet	1	R. Gandhi
23	Salem	1	R. Rajendran
24	Sivagangai	1	K. R. Periyakaruppan
25	Tenkasi		
26	Thanjavur	1	Govi. Chezhian
27	Theni		
28	Thoothukudi	2	Anitha R. Radhakrishnan; P. Geetha Jeevan
29	Tiruchirappalli	2	Anbil Mahesh Poyyamozhi; K. N. Nehru
30	Tirunelveli		
31	Tirupathur		
32	Tiruppur	2	M. P. Saminathan; N. Kayalvizhi
33	Tiruvallur	1	S. M. Nasar
34	Tiruvannamalai	1	E. V. Velu
35	Tiruvarur	1	T.R.B.Rajaa
36	Vellore	1	Durai Murugan
37	Viluppuram		
38	Virudhunagar	2	Sattur Ramachandran; Thangam Thennarasu

== See also ==
- Chief ministership of M. K. Stalin
