= Chief ministership of M. K. Stalin =

Government of Tamil Nadu 2021-2026

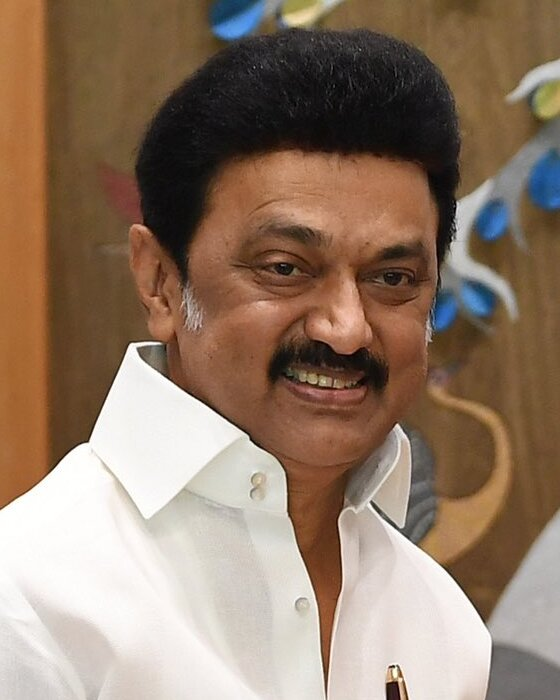
- Stalin in 2022
- Chief ministership of M. K. Stalin; 7 May 2021 – 9 May 2026
- Premier: M. K. Stalin
- Cabinet: Stalin ministry
- Party: Dravida Munnetra Kazhagam
- Election: 2021
- Appointed by: Governor, Banwarilal Purohit
- Seat: Kolathur

Muthuvel Karunanidhi Stalin has served as the 8th Chief Minister of Tamil Nadu from 7 May 2021 to 9 May 2026. He is the leader of the Dravida Munnetra Kazhagam (DMK). During his tenure, the state government had implemented policies and programmes in the state such as economic development, infrastructure, social welfare, education, environmental sustainability, and administrative efficiency.

His tenure had included initiatives such as the Naan Mudhalvan Scheme for skill development, the Green Tamil Nadu Mission aimed at increasing the state’s green cover, and the Chief Minister's Breakfast Scheme to address child nutrition. The government had also introduced measures related to social justice, including appointment of individuals from various castes as temple priests.

== Economic policies ==
During Stalin's tenure, according to data from the Reserve Bank of India, Tamil Nadu recorded a nominal 16% growth in Gross State Domestic Product (GSDP) for the 2024–25 financial year. The GSDP at current prices increased to ₹31.19 lakh crore in 2024–25, compared with ₹26.89 lakh crore in the previous financial year. The real GSDP growth rate for 2024–25 was 11.19%, marking the first time in 14 years that it exceeded 10%, and surpassing earlier estimates of 9.69%. For 2025–26, the real GSDP growth rate was reported at 10.83%.

Significant investments were made in the Indian automotive sector in the years 2025 and 2026. In August 2025, the Vietnamese electric vehicle manufacturer VinFast inaugurated a new manufacturing plant in Thoothukudi, with a reported investment of US$2 billion (₹16,000 crore). Subsequently, in February 2026, Tata Motors and Jaguar Land Rover inaugurated a multi-energy vehicle plant in Ranipet, built at a cost of approximately US$1.1 billion (₹9,000 crore), for the production of both internal combustion engine and electric vehicles.

=== Investment policy ===
During the financial year 2021 to 2023, the Tamil Nadu government reported attracting an investment of ₹9.74 lakh crore, alongside the creation of an estimated 31 lakh jobs across various industrial projects. According to the Union Ministry of Statistics and Programme Implementation, the data for the annual survey of industries (2022-23) indicated that employment in the manufacturing sector increased by 7.5% during the period, with Tamil Nadu recorded as having the highest number of factories and industrial workers in the country. As of 2024, the Government oF$f Tamil Nadu states that it has secured total investment commitments of approximately ₹10.27 lakh crore, with an estimated 32.33 lakh employment opportunities associated with these projects.

=== Tidal Neo Park ===
The Tidal Neo Park is a small-scale information technology park, scheme announced in the Tamil Nadu 2021–22 state budget, aims to promote IT sector growth in the state’s Tier-II and Tier-III cities. Each Tidal Neo Park ranges from 50,000 to 100,000 sq ft in built-up area. The first park was inaugurated in Villupuram in 2024, followed by facilities in Thanjavur, Salem, Thoothukudi, Tiruppur, Karaikudi, Ooty and the most recent park in Vellore, inaugurated on 5 November 2025 at a cost of ₹32 crore. Each park is designed to accommodate 450–600 professionals.

The parks provide modern office infrastructure for IT and ITeS companies and startups, with the objective of supporting local employment and reducing migration to larger urban centres.

=== Vision 2030 ===
Tamil Nadu is India's second largest economy, contributing 9.21% to the national Gross Domestic Product (GDP). For the year 2023–24, the state’s Gross State Domestic Product (GSDP) was reported at approximately US$327 billion, equal to ₹27.22 lakh crore. The government has announced a long-term economic plan to transform the size of the state’s economy to 1 trillion US dollars by 2030. The vision, presented by Chief Minister M. K. Stalin, outlines objectives such as accelerating industrial development, strengthening the state’s role in global manufacturing unit, improving per capita income of the state. The currently per capita income is estimated at about US$3,780. The targeted economic expansion is projected to require sustained real economic growth in the range of 9% to 13% annually.

=== Tamil Nadu's first agriculture budget ===
Stalin released Tamil Nadu's first ever agricultural budget on 14 August 2021, which was dedicated to farmers protesting against the farm laws passed by the Union Government. The one of a kind budget was prepared after consulting farmers from 18 districts of the state and it predominantly aimed at increasing the cultivable land from the existing 60 per cent to 75 per cent. At present, about 10 lakh hectares of land is under cultivation and the agriculture budget promises to increase it to 11.75 lakh hectares.

Under the budget, the newly launched ‘Kalaignarin Anaithu Grama Orunginaindha Velan Valarchi Thittam’, has been introduced to convert wasteland into cultivable land.

== Infrastructure ==
=== Metro ===
Stalin's administration has prioritized infrastructure projects across the states in order to achieve a $1 trillion economy by 2030. The Chennai Metro Rail Phase II project, consisting of a 118.9km route with 128 stations, was proposed by the State Government and expected to complete by 2027. However, in August 2024, the Central Government withdrew its funding for the project. After follow-up from the State government, the central government has approved the project in October 2024.

In the 2023–24 Tamil Nadu state budget, the state government proposed metro rail projects for Coimbatore and Madurai, allocating ₹9,000 crore and ₹8,500 crore respectively. The proposals were subsequently returned by the Union Government of India, which cited the population of both cities as being below 20 lakh, in accordance with the criteria outlined in the Metro Rail Policy. The Government of Tamil Nadu expressed concerns regarding what it described as an uneven application of the policy, noting that metro rail projects had been approved for other cities, including Agra, Patna, and Bhopal, despite their populations being below the same threshold.

=== Airports ===
Parandur Greenfield Airport, located near Chennai, was proposed by the Government of Tamil Nadu in August 2022, considering the existing Chennai International Airport at Meenambakkam is operating near its capacity limits and lacks modern infrastructure, making it difficult to accommodate the increasing passenger and cargo traffic. Land acquisition already commenced, and the construction expected to start late 2026.

On 27 June 2024, Stalin made a suo motu statement in the Tamil Nadu Legislative Assembly proposing the construction of a new international airport at Hosur. The proposed airport was planned to be developed over an area of about 2,000 acres and designed to handle approximately 30 million passengers annually. On 18 January 2026, the Union Ministry of Defence rejected the Tamil Nadu government’s request to establish an airport at Hosur.

=== Urban and rural road works ===
Tamil Nadu has about 1.38 lakh km of rural and panchayat roads. As of mid-2024, government has completed 8,120 km of these roads had been improved, and a proposal for improving 10,000 km has been allocated a budget of ₹4,000 crore, with the work expected to be completed in two years. In addition, the government has completed the construction of high-level bridges, conversion of causeways into bridges, upgradation of major state highways and expressways, development of ring roads and bypasses, and modernization of major bus stands.

In October 2025, an elevated four-lane flyover expressway on Avinashi Road in Coimbatore was inaugurated. The structure is 10.10 km (6.28 mi) long and 17.25 m (56.6 ft) wide, and was constructed at a cost of ₹16.21 billion (US$170 million). In December 2025, a four-lane flyover at the Melamadai junction in Madurai was inaugurated. The flyover was officially named after named after freedom fighter Velu Nachiyar, it is 1.00 km (0.62 mi) long and was constructed at a cost of ₹1.5 billion (US$16 million).

=== Bus terminus ===
Between 2021 and 2026, the Government of Tamil Nadu, under Chief Minister Stalin, undertook the development and inauguration of several bus terminus and transport infrastructure projects across the state. These included the Kalaignar Centenary Bus Terminus in Kilambakkam, Chennai, Panjappur Integrated Bus Terminus in Tiruchirappalli, new bus stands at Ramanathapuram and Mayiladuthurai, and an Integrated Solar Bus Stand, Erode. In addition, renovation and modernization works were carried out at existing bus stands, including the Periyar Bus Stand in Madurai, Tirunelveli and Thanjavur.

== Law and order ==
=== Case withdrawals ===
On 24 Jun 2021, Stalin announced the withdrawn of 5,570 cases that had been filed during the previous AIADMK led government between 2011 and 2021 against journalists, media personnel, and protesters. According to the data these cases were relate to Farm Bill protest 2831 cases, CAA protestors 2282 cases, Methane, neutrino, and Salem expressway projects protestors 405 cases, Koodankulam nuclear protest 26 cases and Media personnel 26 cases.

=== Crime reduction statistics ===
On 20 March 2025, during the Tamil Nadu assembly session, Stalin responded to the leader of Leader of Opposition Edappadi K. Palaniswami, and stated that the state recorded 1,540 murders in 2024 making the lowest in the past 12 years. He compared the statics with the previous AIADMK period noting that 1,943 murders in 2012, 1927 murders in 2020, and 1661 murders were reported in 2020 during the Covid-19 pandemic and lockdown.

== Major Welfare Schemes ==
=== Zero-Ticket Bus Travel scheme for women ===
The free bus travel scheme for women in Tamil Nadu, titled Magalir Vidiyal Payanam in Tamil (also referred to as the Zero-Ticket Bus Travel scheme), was launched on 7 May 2021 by the Government of Tamil Nadu. The scheme provides free travel for women on ordinary government operated city and town buses across the state of Tamil nadu. Reports by the Tamil Nadu State Planning Commission in 2022 noted that beneficiaries recorded monthly savings in the range of ₹400–₹800. A government update released in May 2025 estimated the average monthly savings at around ₹888.

As of October 2024, the average rides 57 lacks women travelling and benefited by this scheme daily. By May 2025, the total number of zero-ticket rides recorded under the scheme reached approximately 682.02 crore, reflecting a significant increase since its introduction. Similar free bus travel initiatives for women have also been introduced in other Indian states, including Karnataka, Telangana, Andhra Pradesh, and Jammu & Kashmir.

=== Pudhumai Penn ===
Stalin launched the Moovalur Ramamirtham Ammaiyar Higher Education Assurance scheme titled 'Pudhumai Penn' at a function in Chennai on 5 September 2022, in the presence of Delhi chief minister Arvind Kejriwal. The scheme was transformed from Moovalur Ramamirtham Ammaiyar Memorial Marriage Assistance Scheme to the Moovalur Ramamirtham Ammaiyar Higher Education Assurance Scheme after recognising that in higher education, the enrolment ratio of girls from government schools was quite low. During the event Kejriwal unveiled 26 schools of excellence and 15 model schools set up by the Tamil Nadu government. Under Pudhumai Penn scheme, girl students, who studied from Class VI to Class XII in state government schools would be paid a monthly assistance of ₹1,000 till they complete their graduation or diploma. Through the scheme, about six lakh girls would be benefited every year. The state government allocated ₹698 crore in the 2022–23 budget for the scheme.

Stalin also announced that 25 schools run by municipal corporations would be elevated as Schools of Excellence in the first phase at a cost of ₹171 crore. The classrooms in these Schools of Excellence would be modernised and art, literature, music, dance, sports among others would be promoted among students.

=== Tamil Pudhalvan ===
Following the launch of the Pudhumai Penn scheme, the Government of Tamil Nadu announced the Tamil Pudhalavan scheme on 14 June 2024. The scheme, titled as a Higher Education Assurance initiative for boys, provides financial assistance of ₹1,000 per month to male students who studied in Classes VI to XII in State-run schools and subsequently enrol in higher education programmes. The government has estimated that approximately 3.28 lakh students will benefit from the scheme.

=== Kalaignar Women's Rights Grant Scheme ===
The Kalaignar Women's Rights Grant Scheme, titled Kalaignar Magalir Urimai Thittam in Tamil, is a welfare programme of the Government of Tamil Nadu, launched on 15 September 2023. The scheme provides ₹1,000 per month to eligible women with the stated objective of recognising unpaid household labour and supporting economic independence. Women aged 21 years and above are eligible if their annual household income is below ₹2.5 lakh and if they satisfy prescribed limits relating to land ownership and electricity consumption. The financial assistance is transferred directly to beneficiaries’ bank accounts. Exclusions under the scheme include regular government employees, income-tax payers, and pensioners.

During the initial application phase, the government received 1.63 crore applications, of which 1.06 crore were approved following eligibility verification. In November 2023, a further 7.35 lakh women were added after an appeals process. As of 2025, the number of beneficiaries stands at 1.15 crore, including 14,246 women from Sri Lankan Tamil refugee families.

A survey conducted by the Tamil Nadu State Planning Commission in June–July 2025 examined the scheme’s impact across districts. According to the assessment, many beneficiaries reported spending the financial assistance primarily on food, with others allocating funds toward medicines, children's education, and savings.

=== Tamil Nadu assured pension scheme ===
In January 2026, the Government of Tamil Nadu announced the Tamil Nadu Assured Pension Scheme (TAPS) for state government employees and teachers. The scheme was introduced in response to demands from employee associations seeking the restoration of benefits similar to those provided under the Old Pension Scheme (OPS). TAPS guarantees a pension equivalent to 50% of the employee’s last-drawn salary. Under the scheme, employees contribute 10% of their salary, while the state government contributes the remaining amount. The pension amount is subject to revision through biannual increases in Dearness Allowance.

== Education and Youth Development ==
=== Chief Minister's Breakfast Scheme ===
Stalin launched the ‘Chief Minister’s Breakfast Scheme’ on 15 September 2022 to prevent hunger and nutritional deficiency in children. The scheme is set to improve the nutritional status of students, eliminate deficiencies such as malnutrition and anaemia, and encourage children in poor households to attend schools.

The cause of concern for anemia among children as a major health problem in Tamil Nadu was highlighted in the National Family Health Survey-5 (NFHS) (2019–21) report. Stalin's Breakfast Scheme is set to minimise, if not eliminate, this inadequacy. The breakfast scheme will be implemented at a cost of ₹33.56 crore in more than 1,500 government-run schools across the state where over 1.14 lakh primary government school children will benefit from it. It is Stalin's hope that the education-nutrition matrix will be an inspiring model for other states.

On 15 July 2024, marking the birth anniversary of former Chief Minister K. Kamaraj, the Government of Tamil Nadu extended the scheme to 3,995 rural government-aided schools, benefiting approximately 223,000 additional students. By August 2025, the scheme was further expanded to include 2,430 urban aided schools, covering around 305,000 more students. With these extensions, the total number of beneficiaries reached more than 2.05 million students in Classes I to V across government and government-aided primary schools. Chief Minister M. K. Stalin stated that the initiative represented “not just a meal, but an investment in the future of Tamil Nadu's students.”

=== Laptop distribution programme for college students ===
On 5 January 2026, Tamil Nadu government announced the launch of the first phase of a free laptop distribution scheme for state-run college students. The programme, titled Ulagam Ungal Kaiyil (Tamil for “The World is in Your Hands”), aims to support student's access to digital learning tools. According to the announcement, the scheme envisages the distribution of a total of 20 lakh laptops. In the first phase, 10 lakh laptops are to be distributed. The state government has allocated ₹2,000 crore for the initiative in the current financial year.

While launching the programme, Chief Minister M. K. Stalin stated that the laptop scheme was intended as an investment in education for the students, rather than a welfare expenditure, and described it as an opportunity to equip students with skills for the future of the students and the state.

Tamil Nadu had previously implemented a free laptop scheme in 2011 under the AIADMK government led by then Chief Minister J. Jayalalithaa. That programme provided laptops to students studying in Class 12 in government schools and to students enrolled in state-run colleges. The scheme saw a decline in implementation towards the later years of the AIADMK administration and was discontinued during the COVID-19 pandemic.

=== Illam Thedi Kalvi ===
Stalin launched the ‘Illam Thedi Kalvi’ scheme on 19 October 2021, notably India's largest volunteer-based education program”, where over 3.3 million students across 92,000 habitations are being taught by 200,000 women volunteers for 90 minutes every day.

Domain experts and Data scientists have praised the ingenuity of the scheme stating that over 24% of the total recovery from learning loss can be attributed to the ‘Illam Thedi Kalvi’ sessions and that the recovery has been a lot more progressive among the disadvantaged group.

=== Naan Mudhalvan ===
Stalin launched the ‘Naan Mudhalvan’ scheme on 1 March 2022; this aims to equip about 10 lakh youth across the State annually with skills that will help them realise their talents for the benefit of the country. He also launched a new portal for this scheme. The scheme aims to identify, train and offer career and academic guidance to talented students in government-run and State-aided educational institutions. It also aims to offer spoken English lessons to enable students to face interview panels successfully. The scheme will offer training capsules in coding and robotics to keep pace with technological advancements. Psychological counsellors and medical doctors will offer guidance on nutrition, physical fitness and overall development of the student's personality.

=== Mudhalvar Padaippagam ===
Muthalvar Padaippagam, also known as Tamil Nadu Learning Centre, is a government-run network of co-working spaces and modern libraries launched by Chief Minister M. K. Stalin in 2024 to support entrepreneurs, start-ups, and exam-preparing students. Each centre offers well-equipped facilities including meeting rooms, conference halls, learning areas, and low-cost rented desk spaces. As of 2026, sixteen such learning centres are operational across Tamil Nadu.

=== Kalaignar Centenary Library ===
On 15 July 2023, the Kalaignar Centenary Library in Madurai city was inaugurated by Stalin. The government-run library was established with an investment of ₹218 crore (approximately US$24 million). It consists of a basement, ground floor, and six additional floors, with a total built-up area of 218,000 sq ft (20,300 m^{2}), with 3.64lakh books. The facility includes a conference hall, a multipurpose hall, and a library studio. The library is designed to serve a wide range of users, including children, students, researchers, job seekers, women, senior citizens, and persons with disabilities.

== Governance and Administratation ==
=== Ungal Thoguthiyil Mudhalamaichar ===
One of M.K. Stalin's key initiatives as chief minister was "Ungal Thoguthiyil Muthalamaichar" (Chief Minister In Your Constituency).This scheme was created to address people's problems and complaints. During his first 100 days in office, more than 2.87 lakh of the 4.75 lakh complaints received was addressed.

The department originated from a programme 'Ungal Thoguthiyil Stalin', which was initiated by DMK President Stalin during his election campaign. Stalin had collected grievances from the citizens and assured them that their issues would be addressed in 100 days once he took office. Experts and journalist Govi Lenin called the scheme a direct reflection of the DMK's core principle, 'Makkalidam Sel' (Go to the People) coined by the party's founding member, C. N. Annadurai.

=== Chief Minister's Dashboard ===
Stalin launched the ‘CM Dashboard Monitoring System’ at his office. On 23 December 2021 which will enable him to track all Welfare schemes, including the status of their implementation, fund allocation and the number of beneficiaries. The dashboard is set to help in proper monitoring, more efficiency, elimination of delays and prompt decision making. It will also update the Chief Minister on the water storage level in key dams, rainfall patterns, daily report on crimes, progress of housing schemes, employment trends, civil supplies in the State. The dashboard will display the status of pleas and representations made on the Chief Minister Helpline and under the ‘CM In Your Constituency’ scheme.

== Health Initiatives ==
=== Innuyir Kappom - Nammai Kakkum 48 ===
Stalin launched ‘Innuyir Kappom-Nammai Kakkum 48’ on 18 November 2021 through which the State government will bear the expenses of emergency care for accident victims for the first 48 hours. Rolling out the scheme at Stalin said that the government was paying special attention to reducing road accidents, preventing fatalities and improving road safety. The scheme is aimed at reducing deaths due to road accidents. A total of 609 hospitals including 201 government hospitals and 408 private hospitals are linked to the scheme. All persons injured in road accidents whether they are covered or not under the Chief Minister's Comprehensive Health Insurance Scheme (CMCHIS), or even those who belong to other States or countries that occur in Tamil Nadu limits would receive treatment for the first 48 hours free of charge. As many as 81 treatment packages have been identified for accident victims in the hospitals where they shall be admitted for the first 48 hours with a ceiling of ₹1 lakh per individual. One of the key highlights of the scheme is that the government would bear the emergency treatment expenses for the first 48 hours in private hospitals, as majority of the lives could be saved if treated appropriately within 48 hours.

=== Kalaignar Centenary Super Specialty Hospital ===
On 15 Jun 2023, Stalin Inaugurated the Kalaignar Centenary Super Specialty Hospital at Guindy, Chennai. The hospital is a government-run healthcare facility established with an investment of ₹230 crore - ₹380 crore. It has a capacity of 1,000 beds and provides advanced medical services free of cost under the Chief Minister's Comprehensive Medical Insurance Scheme.

== Environmental Sustainability ==
=== Green Tamil Nadu Mission ===
Stalin launched the Green Tamil Nadu Mission on 24 September 2022, that aims at increasing the green cover in the state from 23.7% to 33% in the next ten years. The mission will facilitate tree planting initiatives, online seedlings purchase via the Green Tamil Nadu Mission portal.

As of 2024, under the Green Tamil Nadu Mission, the mangrove cover in Tamil Nadu increased from approximately 45 km^{2} (17 sq mi) in 2021 to about 90 km^{2} (35 sq mi). The expansion occurred over a three-year period.

=== Governing Council on Climate Change ===
Stalin set up a 22-member Tamil Nadu Governing Council on Climate Change (GCCC) on 23 October 2022. Montek Singh Ahluwalia, economist; Nandan M Nilekani, co-founder and chairman of Infosys Board; Erik Solheim, Sixth Executive Director of United Nations Environment Programme; Dr Ramesh Ramachandran, founder-director of National Centre for Sustainable Coastal Management; G Sundarrajan, co-ordinator of Poovulagin Nanbargal) and Nirmala Raja, Chairperson, Ramco Community Services are among the members.

The GCCC council has been formed to provide a policy directive to the Tamil Nadu Climate Change Mission, advise on climate adaptation and mitigation activities, provide guidance to the Tamil Nadu State Action Plan on climate change and guide the implementation strategy on climate action.

The terms of reference of the GCCC includes providing guidance to the Climate Change Mission and long-term climate-resilient development pathways, strategies and action plan which will help improve livelihoods, social and economic well-being and responsible environmental management.

The council will periodically monitor outcomes and deliverables based on the strategies being followed. Besides, it will give a continued and sustained push for research, collaboration, and interdisciplinary work, in close coordination with researchers and policymakers.

The council will evaluate the efficacy of existing policies on climate change and learn from sustainable practices across the country and the world for suitable adaptation. The State Environment, Climate Change and Forest Department Secretary Supriya Sahu will be the convenor of the council.

It is to be noted that, Tamil Nadu has been spearheading several initiatives in the field of climate change and has set up three key missions viz., Tamil Nadu Green Mission, Tamil Nadu Climate Change Mission and the Tamil Nadu Wetlands Mission.

== Egalitarianism and social justice in Tamil Nadu ==
Stalin initiated the process to appoint persons of all castes (in contrast to the hereditary system of Brahmin priests) as archakas (priests) for the temples in the State on 15 August 2021, and assured steps will be taken to appoint those trained by the government during the previous DMK government.

Stalin maintained that the move will fulfill the dream of former Chief Minister M Karunanidhi, and Periyar who wanted people of all castes to become temple priests. As a move seen as controversial by many, this policy however garnered him acclaim for it being the right step at a social revolution and combating discrimination at all levels.
