= Mano Thangaraj =

Indian politician

T. Mano Thangaraj
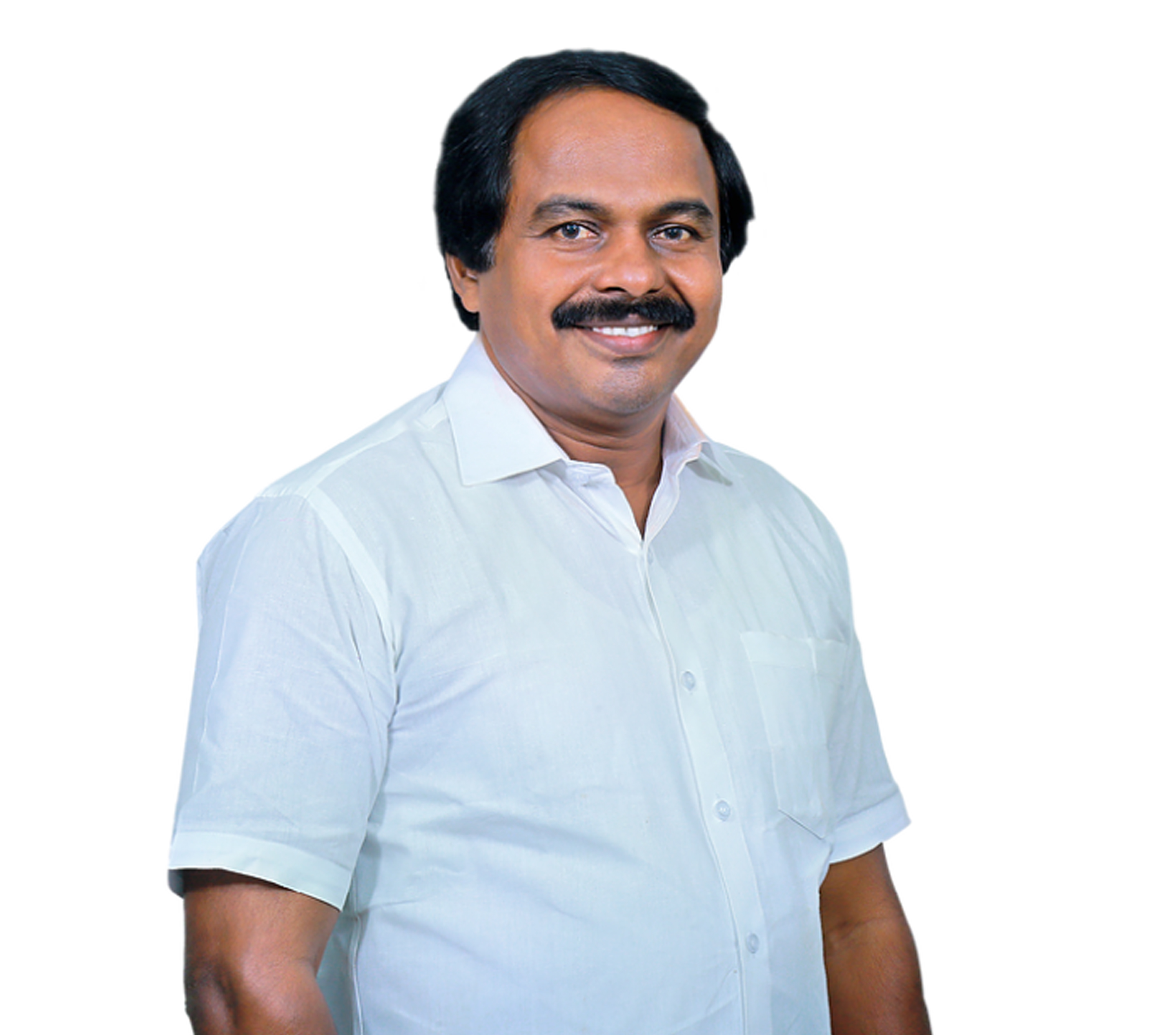
- Mano Thangaraj

Minister for Milk and Dairy Development
- In office 28 April 2025 – 5 May 2026
- Chief Minister: M. K. Stalin
- Preceded by: Raja Kannappan
- In office 11 May 2023 – 28 September 2024
- Chief Minister: M. K. Stalin
- Preceded by: S. M. Nasar
- Succeeded by: Raja Kannappan

Minister of Information & Technology
- In office 7 May 2021 – 10 May 2023
- Chief Minister: M. K. Stalin
- Preceded by: R. B. Udhayakumar
- Succeeded by: P.T.R. Palanivel Thiyagarajan

Member of Tamil Nadu Legislative Assembly
- In office 19 May 2016 – 4 May 2026
- Preceded by: Pushpa Leela Alban
- Constituency: Padmanabapuram

Personal details
- Born: 1 June 1967 (age 58) Karungal, Madras State (now Tamil Nadu), India
- Party: Dravida Munnetra Kazhagam
- Parent: Thangaraj Nadar (father)
- Education: Master of Arts in English literature
- Alma mater: Annamalai University
- Website: https://www.manothangaraj.com/

Mano Thangaraj is an Indian politician from the Dravida Munnetra Kazhagam (DMK). Since May 2016, he has been representing Padmanabhapuram constituency in the Tamil Nadu Legislative Assembly. He is the former Minister of Milk and Dairy Development of Tamil Nadu.

== Early life and education ==
He was born on June 1, 1967, to Thangaraj Nadar from Karungal in Kanyakumari district. He completed his schooling at LMS School, Palliyadi, and studied at Nesamony Memorial Christian College (NMCC) (in Marthandam, Kanyakumari), where he served as the student union chairman. This period sparked his interest in politics. He earned an MA in English literature from Annamalai University in May 1997.

== Activism ==
In 1988, he protested against drawing water from the Pechiparai Reservoir for the Koodankulam Nuclear Power Plant (KKNPP).

== Politics ==
=== Civic Body Member (1996-2006) ===
He served as the district panchayat chairman from 1996 to 2006.

== Ministry ==
Designation	Portfolio	Party	Ministry	To	
Designation	Portfolio	Party	Ministry	Took Office	Left Office
Minister of Milk and Dairy Development	Milk and Dairy Development	DMK	M.K.Stalin	11 May 2023	29 September 2024
Minister of Information Technology & Digital Services	Information Technology and Digital Services	DMK	M.K.Stalin	7 May 2021	10 May 2023

== Electoral performance ==
Year	Constituency	Party	Result	Votes	Vote %
2016 Tamilnadu Assembly Election	Padmanabhapuram	DMK	Won	76,249	47.20
2021 Tamilnadu Assembly Election	Padmanabhapuram	DMK	Won	87,744	51.57

2021 Tamil Nadu Legislative Assembly election: Padmanabhapuram
Party	Candidate	Votes	%	±%
DMK	Mano Thangaraj	87,744	51.57	+4.37
AIADMK	D. John Thankam	60,859	35.77	+13.89
NTK	Seelan	13,899	8.17	+7.66
AMMK	D. Jenkins	3,234	1.90	New
BSP	P. Latha	1,272	0.75	New
NOTA	NOTA	1,036	0.61	−0.23
MNM	M. Jeyaraj	981	0.58	New
Margin of victory		26,885	15.80	−9.52
Turnout		170,156	71.18	2.84
Rejected ballots		1443	0.85	
Registered electors		239,036		
DMK hold		Swing	4.37	

2016 Tamil Nadu Legislative Assembly election: Padmanabhapuram
Party	Candidate	Votes	%	±%
DMK	Mano Thangaraj	76,249	47.20	+5.72
AIADMK	K. P. Rajendra Prasad	35,344	21.88	New
BJP	Su. Sheeba Prasad	31,994	19.80	−4.09
DMDK	D. Jeganathan	13,185	8.16	−19.94
NOTA	NOTA	1,359	0.84	New
NTK	Arul Selestin Raj	826	0.51	New
Margin of victory		40,905	25.32	11.94
Turnout		161,560	68.34	−1.60
Registered electors		236,398		
DMK hold		Swing	5.72	

=== Ministership (2021-) ===
==== GITEX 2022 ====
He participated in GITEX 2022 at Dubai as a representative of Ministry for Information Technology & Digital Services, India for Government of Tamil Nadu. He met a lot of founders, CEOs, top leadership of Indian Startups at GITEX, Dubai, during “Meet Indian Startups” event organised by the Consulate General of India, Dubai on 12 October 2022.

== Philanthropy ==
He owns the Good Vision Charitable Trust which was working on women, children and sanitation related issues.
