= Raja Kannappan =

Indian politician

Minister for Forests and Khadi
- In office 27 April 2025 – 5 May 2026
- Chief Minister: M. K. Stalin
- Preceded by: K. Ponmudy

Minister for Milk and Dairy Development
- In office 28 September 2024 – 27 April 2025
- Chief Minister: M. K. Stalin
- Preceded by: Mano Thangaraj
- Succeeded by: Mano Thangaraj

Minister for Higher Education
- In office 21 December 2023 – 22 March 2024
- Chief Minister: M. K. Stalin
- Preceded by: K. Ponmudy
- Succeeded by: K. Ponmudy

Minister of Backward Classes Welfare
- In office 29 March 2022 – 28 September 2024
- Preceded by: S. S. Sivasankar
- Succeeded by: Meyyanathan Siva V

Minister of Transport
- In office 7 May 2021 – 29 March 2022
- Chief Minister: M. K. Stalin
- Preceded by: M. R. Vijayabhaskar
- Succeeded by: S. S. Sivasankar

Minister of Public Works, Highways and Electricity
- In office 24 June 1991 – 12 May 1996
- Chief Minister: J. Jayalalithaa

Member of Legislative Assembly, Tamil Nadu
- Incumbent
- Assumed office 12 May 2021
- Preceded by: S. Pandi
- Constituency: Mudukulathur constituency
- In office 20 June 1991 – 10 May 1996
- Constituency: Tiruppattur constituency
- In office 11 May 2006 – 28 February 2009
- Constituency: Ilayankudi constituency

Personal details
- Born: Adhappadaiki, Tamil Nadu, India
- Party: DMK
- Parent: Sellam
- Occupation: Politics & Agriculture

R. Sellam Raja Kannappan, formerly known as S. Kannappan, is an Indian politician and Minister for Backward Classes Welfare and Higher Education. He also served as the Minister for Khadi and Village Industries from 2022 to 2023, Minister of Transport, Nationalised Transport, Motor Vehicles Act in the period 2021- March 2022 and also former Minister of Public Works, Highways and Electricity during 1991–1996. He joined the party DMK in February 2020.

== Political career ==
He was elected to the Tamil Nadu legislative assembly as an Anna Dravida Munnetra Kazhagam (ADMK) candidate from Tiruppattur (194) constituency in 1991 election. He served as minister of Public Works during 1991–1996. He later founded the Makkal Tamil Desam (MTD) party.

The MTD contested the 2001 election as a junior partner in the Dravida Munnetra Kazhagam (DMK) led front. In 2006, Kannappan dissolved his party and joined the DMK. He contested and won the 2006 election from the Ilaiyangudi constituency as a DMK candidate. In February 2009 he resigned from DMK and as an MLA. He joined the ADMK and contested the 2009 Indian general elections from the Sivaganga parliamentary constituency. He was defeated by the Indian National Congress (INC) candidate P. Chidambaram in a close election.

Kannappan claimed that the BJP is attempting to saffronise the southern districts and polarise the voters on religious lines. He blamed the AIADMK leadership for aiding this situation. He then quit the AIADMK and decided to support the DMK-led front in the 2019 Lok Sabha elections.

1972	Initiated as member in the Anna Dravida Munnetra Kazhagam (AIADMK) under the leadership of M.G.R., when he started the party.
1972–1980	District Student–Wing Secretary of AIADMK, of the combined districts of Ramanathapuram, Sivagangai and Virudhunagar under the leadership of M.G.R.
1982–1984	Union Secretary, Kalaiyarkovil, Sivagangai District under the leadership of M.G.R.
1984–1987	District Secretary, Sivagangai District under the leadership of M.G.R.
1987–1989	District Secretary, Sivagangai District of the AIADMK(J) headed by Selvi J. Jayalalitha.
1989	Contested the Tamil Nadu Legislative Assembly Election from the Thirupattur Constituency, Sivagangai District, under the Seval symbol of the AIADMK(J) headed by Selvi. J. Jayalalitha.
1989–1991	District Secretary, Sivagangai Disrtrict of the United AIADMK under the leadership of Selvi. J. Jayalalitha.
1991	Contested and Elected to the Tamil Nadu Legislative Assembly Elections from the Thirupattur Constituency, Sivagangai District, under the leadership of Selvi. J. Jayalalitha.
1991–1996	Nominated to the Council of Ministers as Minister for Highways, Public Works Department and Electricity, Government of Tamil Nadu by Selvi. J. Jayalalitha. Held the post of Organizing Secretary of the AIADMK. Then held the post of Treasurer of AIADMK under auspices of Selvi. J. Jayalalitha. He was given the title of "Computer Kannappan" by Selvi. J. Jeyalalitha for his efficiency in handling three major portfolios and conducting party activities.
2000	Started Makkal Tamil Desam Party in 2000 with more than 27 Lakh members and conducted a State Level Conference in Chennai on 23 December 2000 with around 25 Lakh members. And it was narrated as a huge conference in Tamil Nadu by all newspapers.
2001	Contested the Tamil Nadu Legislative Assembly Elections from Ilayankudi, Sivagangai District through his party Makkal Tamil Desam.
2004	Makkal Tamil Desam Party was in Third Front in the Local Body Elections conducted in Tamil Nadu and the party members won in many places. MTD Party led the Third Front in the Member of Parliament Elections held in 2004.
2006	Contested and Elected to the Legislative Assembly Elections from Ilayankudi Constituency, Sivagangai District.
2008	Represented India to attend Commonwealth of Nations held at Canada.
2008	Member of Delimitation Committee.
2009	Joined AIADMK and was asked by Selvi. J. Jayalalitha to represent AIADMK in the Parliament by contesting the Loksabha Election held in 2009. He contested from Sivagangai Constituency and lost to the Congress Candidate P.Chidambaram. P.Chidambaram was declared the winner by a small margin of about 3400 votes. Even today, news articles (both print and video) announcing the details of the election and Kannappan's election petition against P.Chidambaram can be found on the internet. The case filed in 2009 is still unresolved though Chidambaram has completed his term as Lok sabha member from Sivaganga in May 2014.
2011	Contested the Legislative Assembly Elections from Thirupattur Constituency, Sivagangai District.
2014	Appointed by Selvi. J. Jeyalalitha as an incharge of AIADMK for Member of Parliament Elections to Southern Districts of Tamil Nadu which includes 10 constituencies.
2016	Appointed by Selvi. J. Jeyalalitha as an incharge of AIADMK for Legislative Assembly Elections of Tamil Nadu.

== Controversy ==
Kannappan — together with his wife, mother, two brothers, two sisters and mother-in-law — were among several former ADMK legislators charged with having assets disproportionate to their known income by Tamil Nadu Police in June 2005. The issue had first been investigated in 1996 and all charges were dismissed by the courts in 2015 due to lack of evidence, by which time his wife and mother had died.
