= M. Mathiventhan =

Indian politician

Minister for Adi Dravidar and Tribal Welfare Government of Tamil Nadu
- In office 28 September 2024 – 5 May 2026
- Chief Minister: M. K. Stalin
- Preceded by: N. Kayalvizhi
- Succeeded by: Vanni Arasu

Minister for Forests Government of Tamil Nadu
- In office 14 December 2022 – 28 September 2024
- Chief Minister: M. K. Stalin
- Preceded by: K. Ramachandran
- Succeeded by: K. Ponmudy

Minister for Tourism Government of Tamil Nadu
- In office 7 May 2021 – 14 December 2022
- Chief Minister: M. K. Stalin
- Preceded by: Vellamandi N. Natarajan
- Succeeded by: K. Ramachandran

Member of Tamil Nadu Legislative Assembly
- In office 2 May 2021 – 5 May 2026
- Preceded by: R. Saroja
- Constituency: Rasipuram

Personal details
- Born: 25 December 1984 (age 41) Rasipuram, Salem district, (now in) Namakkal district, Tamilnadu, India
- Party: Dravida Munnetra Kazhagam
- Spouse: Sivaranjini
- Children: 1
- Occupation: Doctor Politician
- Website: Ministers of Tamilnadu Legislative Assembly

Mayavan Mathiventhan is an Indian politician Who previously served as Minister of Forests in the M. K. Stalin ministry. He is a doctor from Rasipuram, Tamilnadu. He is a member of DMK party, who previously served as the Member of the Legislative Assembly for Rasipuram constituency from 2021-2026 but lost to TVK candidate and incumbent Minister Logesh Dhanapal. He also served as the Minister of tourism and Minister of Adi Dravidar welfare.He is currently the Vice president of the DMK SC/ST welfare wing.

== Family ==
Mathiventhan's father is Mayavan. He is married to Sivaranjini Mathiventhan. The couple have a daughter. They live in Rasipuram.

== Occupation ==
Mathiventhan has held MBBS and MD degrees in allopathic medicine. He is an Alumnus of Annamalai University. He is working at own dispensary clinic in Rasipuram Town.

== Politics ==
He defeated former Minister V.Saroja in the Rasipuram assembly constituency of Namakkal district in the 2021 Tamil Nadu assembly elections and was elected as a member of the assembly for DMK party. He subsequently became the Minister of Tourism Development on 7 May 2021. He was re-designated as the Minister for Forests following a cabinet reshuffle on 14 December 2022.
