= Udhayanidhi Stalin =

Indian politician and former deputy chief ministers of Tamil Nadu

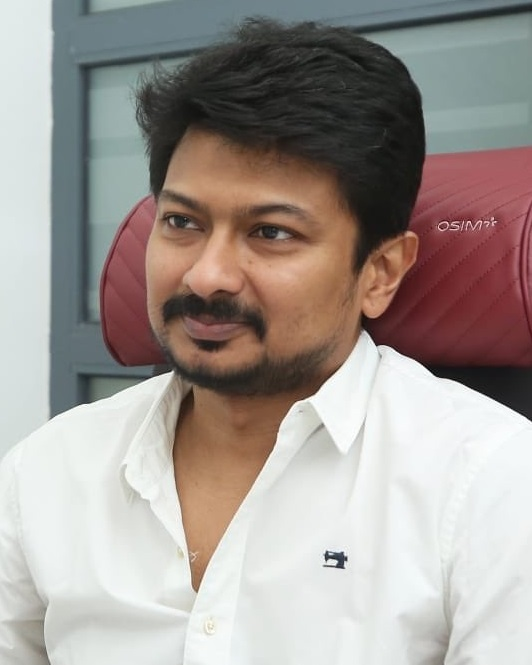
- Udhayanidhi in 2020

19th Leader of the Opposition in the Tamil Nadu Legislative Assembly
- Incumbent
- Assumed office 10 May 2026
- Deputy: K. N. Nehru
- Chief Minister: C. Joseph Vijay
- Preceded by: Edappadi K. Palaniswami

3rd Deputy Chief Minister of Tamil Nadu
- In office 28 September 2024 – 10 May 2026
- Governor: R. N. Ravi; Rajendra Arlekar
- Chief Minister: M. K. Stalin
- Portfolios: Youth Welfare; Sports Development; Special Programme Implementation Department; Poverty Alleviation Programme; Rural Indebtedness and Planning and Development

Member of Tamil Nadu Legislative Assembly
- Incumbent
- Assumed office 11 May 2021
- Preceded by: J. Anbazhagan
- Constituency: Chepauk-Thiruvallikeni

Youth Wing Secretary of Dravida Munnetra Kazhagam
- Incumbent
- Assumed office 4 July 2019
- President: M. K. Stalin
- General Secretary: K. Anbazhagan; Durai Murugan
- Preceded by: M. P. Saminathan

Cabinet Minister, Government of Tamil Nadu
- In office 14 December 2022 – 10 May 2026
- Chief Minister: M. K. Stalin
- Ministry and Departments: Youth Welfare; Sports Development; Special Program Implementation Department & Poverty Alleviation Programme; Rural Indebtedness
- Preceded by: Siva. V Meyyanathan

Personal details
- Born: 27 November 1977 (age 48) Alwarpet Chennai, Tamil Nadu, India
- Party: Dravida Munnetra Kazhagam
- Spouse: Kiruthiga Ramasamy (m. 2002)
- Children: 2
- Parent: M. K. Stalin (father)
- Relatives: Karunanidhi family
- Education: Loyola College, Chennai
- Occupation: Film producer; film distributor; actor; (2008–2025): Politician; (2019–present)

Udhayanidhi Stalin (born 27 November 1977) is an Indian politician and former actor who has been the 19th and incumbent Leader of the Opposition in Tamil Nadu Legislative Assembly since May 2026. Prior to his political career, he was an actor who also produced and distributed films through his Red Giant Movies. He also served as the third Deputy Chief minister of Tamil Nadu from 2024 to 2026. Udhayanidhi is the son of M. K. Stalin, the ninth Chief Minister of Tamil Nadu. He is the third and the youngest to hold the position of deputy chief minister of the state. Udhayanidhi served as the Minister of Youth Welfare and Sports Development from December 2022 to May 2026.

Udhayanidhi attended the Don Bosco Matriculation Higher Secondary School in Egmore, Madras and later received a degree in commerce from Loyola College, Chennai.

In 2019, Udhayanidhi entered into politics after being appointed as the secretary of the youth wing of the Dravida Munnetra Kazhagam, led by his father Stalin. In 2021, he was elected as a Member of the Tamil Nadu Legislative Assembly from the Chepauk-Thiruvallikeni Assembly constituency.

== Early life and family ==
Udhayanidhi Stalin was born on 27 November 1977, to M. K. Stalin and Durga Stalin. Both his father and his grandfather M. Karunanidhi have served as chief ministers. He attended the Don Bosco school and has a degree in commerce from Loyola College in Chennai. His cousins Arulnithi and Dayanidhi Azhagiri are involved in the film industry.

== Film career ==
Udhayanidhi founded the film production company Red Giant Movies in 2008 and the company's first film was Kuruvi (2008), starring Vijay. The company later produced Aadhavan (2009) and Manmadan Ambu (2010), directed by K. S. Ravikumar, and AR Murugadoss's science fiction film 7 Aum Arivu (2011). The company ventured into film distribution and released four films–Gautham Vasudev Menon's Vinnaithaandi Varuvaayaa, A. L. Vijay's Madrasapattinam, M. Rajesh's Boss Engira Bhaskaran, and Prabhu Solomon's Mynaa in 2011.

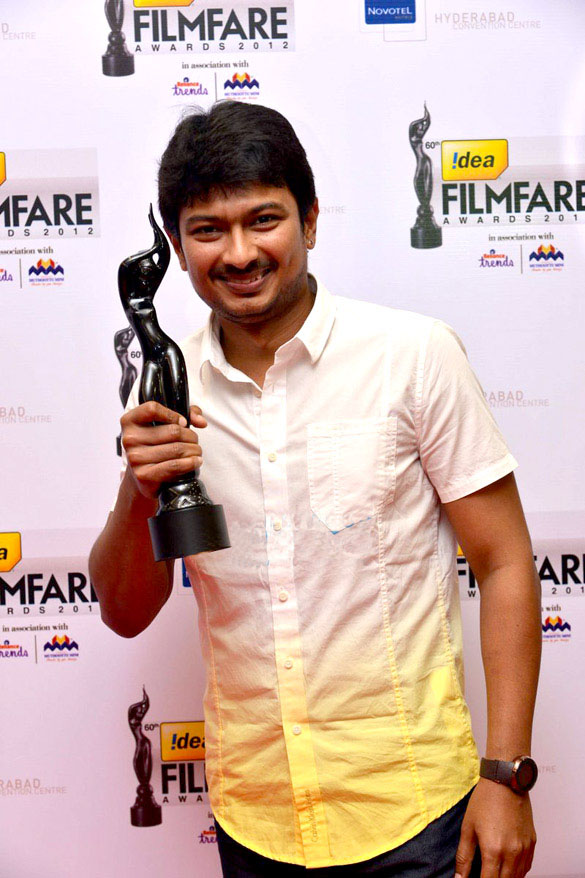
Udhayanidhi at the 60th South Filmfare Awards in 2013

In 2012, Udhayanidhi debuted as a lead actor in Rajesh's romantic comedy Oru Kal Oru Kannadi (2012), co-starring with Hansika Motwani and Santhanam. The film received mixed reviews for his performance as an unemployed youth. Behindwoods noted that "Udhay's portrayal of Saravanan is neat and enjoyable", while Sify commented "Udhay's debut is promising and hats off to him to underplay his role". He won the Filmfare Award for Best Male Debut for his performance. He continued acting in further movies and he appeared in the lead role in Idhu Kathirvelan Kadhal (2014) and Nanbenda (2015), both films featuring him opposite Nayanthara. His next film was the action film Gethu with Amy Jackson in 2016. In the same year, he acted in the courtroom drama Manithan (2016), a remake of the Hindi film Jolly LLB.

In 2017, Udhayanidhi worked in the comedy entertainer Saravanan Irukka Bayamaen from director Ezhil, followed by Podhuvaga Emmanasu Thangam. Later, he acted in the action thriller Ippadai Vellum in which his performance was described as decent. His next film was the drama Nimir (2018), a remake of Malayalam film Maheshinte Prathikaaram directed by Priyadarshan, which released to negative reviews. He later acted in the romantic drama Kanne Kalaimaane alongside Tamannaah. In 2020, he appeared in Mysskin's Psycho, a film based on the story of a serial killer, which received positive reviews. In 2022, he played the role of a police office in Nenjuku Needhi, a remake of the Hindi film Article 15. He starred in Magizh Thirumeni's thriller Kalaga Thalaivan, which was a failure in the box office. He made his final film appearance in Maamannan (2023), and announced his resignation from Red Giant Movies in July 2023.

== Political career ==
Udhayanidhi contested and won from the Chepauk-Thiruvallikeni Assembly constituency in the 2021 Tamil Nadu Legislative Assembly election. He introduced robotic sewer cleaners in his constituency for the first time in Tamil Nadu on 21 June 2021. On 13 September 2021, he was nominated as a member of Anna University's syndicate for a period of three years.

Udhayanidhi was sworn in as minister of Youth Welfare and Sports Development on 14 December 2022. In September 2024, he was appointed as the deputy chief minister, becoming the third person and the youngest to hold the office.

== Controversies ==
During an election rally at Dharapuram in 2021, Udhyanidhi, while responding to comments made by Indian prime minister Narendra Modi, where Modi had said that Udhyanidhi had reached a top position in the party by sidelining several senior leaders, alleged that former union ministers Sushma Swaraj and Arun Jaitley died due to stress from work given by prime minister Modi. Bansuri Swaraj, the daughter of Sushma Swaraj, and Sonali Jaitley, the daughter of Arun Jaitley, condemned the statement. The Election Commission of India issued a notice to Udhayanidhi for violation of the code of conduct and asked him for a response.

On 2 September 2023, while addressing a conference, Udhayanidhi made a statement likening Sanatana Dharma to diseases like malaria and dengue. He stated that Sanatana Dharma should not merely be opposed but must be eradicated, claiming that it opposes social justice and equality. The remark was met with outrage, with many political leaders expressing their disapproval. Lawyer Vineet Jindal filed a complaint against Udhayanidhi with the Delhi Police calling them "provocative, inciting and defamatory", and advocate Sudhir Kumar Ojha filed a case with the Muzaffarpur Magistrate Court. The Madras High Court later criticised the Tamil Nadu Police for not initiating an action against him. However, Udhayanidhi retorted that he hasn't said anything wrong and is ready to face legal consequences, stating that his ideology aligns with that of B.R. Ambedkar, and Periyar. The Madras High Court ruled that Stalin's remark amounted to hate speech.

Following a letter signed by 262 notable citizens and addressed to the Chief Justice of India D.Y. Chandrachud, the Supreme Court of India took suo moto cognisance of the case. On 22 September 2023, the Supreme Court issued a notice to the Government of Tamil Nadu and Udhayanidhi to respond to the case. On 4 March 2024, the Supreme Court rebuked Udhayanidhi over his remarks for allegedly misusing his right to freedom of speech and expression. The court further noted that, as a minister, he should have exercised caution in his statements and been mindful of the potential consequences.

On 12 May 2026, during his maiden speech as Leader of the Opposition in the Tamil Nadu Legislative Assembly, Udhayanidhi reiterated: "Sanatana Dharma, which divides the people, must certainly be abolished/eradiated." The remarks came in the context of opposing caste divisions and alongside objections to the handling of the Tamil anthem “Tamil Thai Valthu”. They immediately reignited national debate. The BJP strongly condemned them as hate speech and "venom" against Hindu beliefs. Hindu groups organized protests in Tamil Nadu. Some TVK MLAs, such as VMS Mustafa, expressed support for opposing caste bias while clarifying they were not against religion. Udhayanidhi Stalin stated that his comments were aimed at eradicating caste-based inequality and oppression (echoing Periyar, Ambedkar, and Annadurai), not against visiting temples or religious faith. He emphasized equal rights in society and temples.

On 4 August 2026, Udhayanidhi Stalin was arrested from his residence in Neelankarai for his remarks while talking about the Kaveri River water dispute, he stated that whether or not the Kaveri water issue was resolved, water will go where it's needed. Few people found it to be a double meaning pun. Following this incident, a petition seeking anticipatory bail was filed before the Madras High Court. He was released the same day.

== Personal life ==
Udhayanidhi married Kiruthiga in 2002. They have a son named Inban and a daughter named Tanmaya. Kiruthiga, who heads the lifestyle magazine Inbox 1305, has also directed a few films. Inban was a football player, and has been the chief executive of Red Giant Movies since 2025. Udhayanidhi describes himself as an atheist.

== Filmography ==
=== As actor ===
Film credits as actor
Year	Title	Role	Notes
2009	Aadhavan	Servant	Guest appearance
2012	Oru Kal Oru Kannadi	Saravanan	SIIMA Award for Best Male Debutant; Filmfare Award for Best Male Debut – South; Norway Tamil Film Festival Award for Best Newcomer Actor
2013	Vanakkam Chennai	Prospective tenant	Guest appearance
2014	Idhu Kathirvelan Kadhal	Kathirvelan	
2015	Nannbenda	Sathya	
2016	Gethu	Sethu	
2016	Manithan	Sakthivel	
2017	Saravanan Irukka Bayamaen	Saravanan	
2017	Podhuvaga Emmanasu Thangam	Ganesh	
2017	Ippadai Vellum	Madhusoodhanan	
2018	Nimir	Selvam	
2019	Kanne Kalaimaane	Kamala Kannan	
2020	Psycho	Gautham	
2022	Nenjuku Needhi	S. Vijayaraghavan	
2022	Kalaga Thalaivan	Thirumaaran	
2023	Kannai Nambathey	Arun	
2023	Maamannan	Athiveeran (Veera)	Last film

=== As producer ===
Film credits as producer
Year	Title
2008	Kuruvi
2009	Aadhavan
2010	Manmadan Ambu
2011	7 Aum Arivu
2012	Neerparavai
2013	Vanakkam Chennai
2014	Idhu Kathirvelan Kadhal
2015	Nannbenda
2016	Gethu
2016	Manithan
2017	Saravanan Irukka Bayamaen
2019	Kanne Kalaimaane
2022	Kalaga Thalaivan
2023	Maamannan
2024	Indian 2
2025	Kadhalikka Neramillai

=== As distributor ===
Film credits as distributor
Year	Film
2010	Vinnaithaandi Varuvaayaa
2010	Madrasapattinam
2010	Boss Engira Bhaskaran
2010	Mynaa
2011	Mankatha
2019	Bakrid
2021	Aranmanai 3
2022	Radhe Shyam (Tamil version)
2022	Kaathuvaakula Rendu Kaadhal
2022	Beast
2022	Don
2022	Vikram
2022	Cobra
2022	Captain
2022	Vendhu Thanindhathu Kaadu
2022	Ponniyin Selvan: I
2022	Love Today
2023	Thunivu
2023	Varisu
2023	Ponniyin Selvan: II
2023	Maaveeran
2025	Thug Life

== Elections contested and positions held ==
=== Tamil Nadu Legislative Assembly elections ===
Election	Assembly	Constituency	Political party	Result	Vote percentage	Opposition		
Election	Assembly	Constituency	Political party	Result	Vote percentage	Candidate	Political party	Vote percentage
2021	16th	Chepauk-Thiruvallikeni	Dravida Munnetra Kazhagam	Won	67.89%	A. V. A. Kassali	Pattali Makkal Katchi	17.42%
2026	17th	Chepauk-Thiruvallikeni	Dravida Munnetra Kazhagam	Won	44.76	Selvam D	Tamilaga Vettri Kazhagam	39.68

=== Positions in Tamil Nadu Legislative Assembly ===
Elections	Position	Elected constituency	Term in office		
Elections	Position	Elected constituency	Assumed office	Left office	Time in office
2021	Member of the Legislative Assembly	Chepauk-Thiruvallikeni	11 May 2021	Incumbent	5 years, 195 days
2021	Minister for Youth Welfare and Sports Development	Chepauk-Thiruvallikeni	14 December 2022	5 May 2026	3 years, 142 days
2021	Deputy Chief Minister of Tamil Nadu	Chepauk-Thiruvallikeni	28 September 2024	5 May 2026	1 year, 219 days
2026	Leader of Opposition of Tamil Nadu	Chepauk-Thiruvallikeni	10 May 2026	Incumbent	196 days
