= Kalaignar Centenary Super Specialty Hospital =

Hospital in Chennai, India

The Kalaignar Centenary Super Specialty Hospital is a government-run healthcare facility located in Guindy, Chennai, India. Inaugurated on 15 June 2023, by the Former Chief Minister of Tamil Nadu M.K. Stalin, the hospital was established with an investment of ₹230 crore - ₹380 crore. It has a capacity of 1,000 beds and provides advanced medical services free of cost under the Chief Minister's Comprehensive Medical Insurance Scheme.

== History ==
The Kalaignar Centenary Super Specialty Hospital was a proposed 500-bed multi-super specialty hospital in Chennai, Tamil Nadu, India. It was planned to be constructed on the King Institute campus in Guindy. Announced by the Tamil Nadu government on 3 June 2021, the hospital was to be established at a cost of ₹250 crore. The project was part of a series of initiatives unveiled to commemorate the 98th birth anniversary of former Chief Minister and DMK leader M. Karunanidhi. It spans an area of 51,249 square meters and consists of seven floors, with a total capacity of 1,000 beds. The project was completed at a cost of ₹230 crore.

Although initially invited, President Droupadi Murmu was unable to attend the hospital's inauguration due to scheduling conflicts with her state visits to Suriname and Serbia. Consequently, the inauguration was presided over by the former Chief Minister Stalin on 15 June 2023. The hospital was formally opened on 15 June 2023, by M. K. Stalin, alongside four nurses. A feature of the event was a golden statue of DMK patriarch M. Karunanidhi, seated with a pen and writing pad. The six-storied hospital building was constructed in a record 15 months.

The hospital houses the National Centre for Ageing, a 200-bed facility with 40 intensive care units. This centre functions under the Rajiv Gandhi Government General Hospital and was inaugurated virtually by Prime Minister Narendra Modi on 25 February 2023. It is particularly focused on providing specialized care for elderly patients, including those referred from the Geriatrics Department at the Rajiv Gandhi Government General Hospital.

In its first year of operation, the hospital treated over 2 lakh outpatients, admitted 63,505 in-patients and conducted 2,179 surgeries.

The hospital has performed many complicated surgeries over its time some of them are:

- Cardiac Surgery
- Neurosurgical Surgery
- Orthopedic Surgery
- General Surgery
- Oncological Surgery
- Gastrointestinal Surgery

== Infrastructure ==
The KCSSH comes equipped with impressive infrastructure, some key features are:

- State of the art facilities - The hospital comes with Modern Intensive Care Units (MICU), CT Scans, MRI, and Cardiac Cath Labs.
- Specialized Departments - The department includes Cardiology, Pulmonology, Neurology, Oncology, and Gastroenterology.
- Public Essential Spaces - The hospital holds yoga rooms, prayer and reading rooms, and recreational areas like Carom Boards Games and chess rooms to support the well-being of patients and staff.
- Green Building Practices - The hospital has achieved the Gold Rating under the CII Indian Green Building Council's Green Healthcare Facilities Rating. The hospital focuses on sustainability and environmental responsibility.
- Comfortable Accommodations - The KCSSH offers pay wards with air conditioning, separate baths and toilets, and Modern Intensive Care Units (MICU).
- Obtainability - The hospital is disabled-friendly, with lifts and CCTV camera, Security Guards for added security.

== Incidents ==
On 13 November 2024, Balaji Jagannath, an oncologist at KCSSH was stabbed by one of his patient's relatives. The relative, Vignesh, stabbed Jagannath in the neck, head and back many times. The stabbing occurred due to dissatisfaction with the treatment given to his mother, who is suffering advanced-stage cancer. Following the incident, the Greater Chennai Police established outposts staffed by one sub-inspector and two constables at the Kalaignar Centenary Super Specialty Hospital and several other government hospitals, including the Tamil Nadu Government Multi Super Specialty Hospital and Royapuram Government RSRM Hospital.
