= List of deputy chief ministers of Tamil Nadu =

Deputy Leader of the executive of the Government of Tamil Nadu

Deputy Chief Minister of Tamil Nadu
- Tamiḻnāṭu Tuṇai Mutalamaiccar
- Emblem of Tamil Nadu

- Flag of India
- Incumbent; Vacant since 6 May 2026
- Reports to: Chief Minister of Tamil Nadu
- Appointer: Governor of Tamil Nadu
- Formation: 29 May 2009; 17 years ago
- First holder: M. K. Stalin

The deputy chief minister of Tamil Nadu is the deputy to the chief minister of Tamil Nadu, who is the head of the government of Tamil Nadu. The deputy chief minister is the council of ministers of Tamil Nadu's second-highest-ranking member. A deputy chief minister also holds a cabinet portfolio in the state ministry. In the legislative assembly system of government, the position of deputy chief minister is used to govern the state with the support of a single party member to bring political stability and strength within a coalition government or in times of state emergency when a proper chain of command is necessary. On multiple occasions, proposals have arisen to make the post permanent, but without result. The position of deputy chief minister is not explicitly defined in the Constitution of India. However, the Supreme Court of India has clarified that appointing deputy chief ministers is not unconstitutional. The court has also emphasized that a deputy chief minister functions as a minister within the council of ministers led by the chief minister and does not receive a higher salary or additional perks compared to other ministers. During the chief minister's absence, the deputy chief minister may chair cabinet meetings and lead the assembly majority. Additionally, various deputy chief ministers have taken the same oath of secrecy as the chief minister. However, this oath has sparked some controversies.

The office has been only intermittently occupied, with a total tenure of just over 7 years in the 17 years since its inauguration. Since 2009, Tamil Nadu has had 3 deputy chief ministers; none of them have completed a full term in the role. The position was first held by M. K. Stalin of the Dravida Munnetra Kazhagam (DMK), who also served as minister for rural development and local administration in M. Karunanidhi’s fifth ministry. Following his tenure, the post remained vacant until O. Panneerselvam of the All India Anna Dravida Munnetra Kazhagam (AIADMK) assumed the role. He became the longest-serving deputy chief minister, holding the position alongside his responsibilities as finance minister in Edappadi K. Palaniswami's ministry. Most recently, Udhayanidhi Stalin of the DMK was appointed deputy chief minister while also serving as minister for youth welfare and sports development in Stalin's ministry.

The current government does not have a deputy chief minister, and the post has been vacant since 6 May 2026.

== List ==
AIADMK (1) DMK (2)
No.	Portrait	Name (Birth–Death)	Elected constituency	Term of office (Note: The ordinal number of the term being served by the person specified in the row in the corresponding period.)			Assembly (Election)	Appointer	Political party (Note: This column only names the deputy chief minister's party. The state government he heads with chief minister may be a complex coalition of several parties and independents; these are not listed here.)	Chief Minister
No.	Portrait	Name (Birth–Death)	Elected constituency	Assumed office	Left office	Time in office	Assembly (Election)	Appointer	Political party	Chief Minister
1		M. K. Stalin (b. 1953)	Thousand Lights	29 May 2009	14 May 2011	1 year, 350 days	13th (2006)	Surjit Singh Barnala	Dravida Munnetra Kazhagam	M. Karunanidhi
–	Vacant (15 May 2011 – 20 August 2017)									
2		O. Panneerselvam (b. 1951)	Bodinayakanur	21 August 2017	3 May 2021	3 years, 255 days	15th (2016)	C. Vidyasagar Rao	All India Anna Dravida Munnetra Kazhagam	Edappadi K. Palaniswami
–	Vacant (4 May 2021 – 27 September 2024)									
3		Udhayanidhi Stalin (b. 1977)	Chepauk-Thiruvallikeni	28 September 2024	5 May 2026	1 year, 219 days	16th (2021)	R. N. Ravi	Dravida Munnetra Kazhagam	M. K. Stalin
–	Vacant (Since 6 May 2026)									

Timeline

== Statistics ==
List of deputy chief ministers by length of term

No.	Name	Party	Length of term	
No.	Name	Party	Longest continuous term	Total duration of deputy chief ministership
1	O. Panneerselvam	AIADMK	3 years, 255 days	3 years, 255 days
2	M. K. Stalin	DMK	1 year, 350 days	1 year, 350 days
3	Udhayanidhi Stalin	DMK	1 year, 219 days	1 year, 219 days

List by party

Parties by total time-span of their member holding DCMO (19 October 2026)
No.	Political party	Number of deputy chief ministers	Total days of holding DCMO
1	All India Anna Dravida Munnetra Kazhagam	1	1351 days
2	Dravida Munnetra Kazhagam	2	1299 days

Parties by total duration (in days) of holding Deputy Chief Minister's Office

- AIADMK
- DMK

== See also ==
- History of Tamil Nadu
- Politics of Tamil Nadu
- Elections in Tamil Nadu
- Governor of Tamil Nadu
- Chief Minister of Tamil Nadu
- Chief Secretariat of Tamil Nadu
- Tamil Nadu Legislative Assembly
- List of current Indian deputy chief ministers
- Speaker of the Tamil Nadu Legislative Assembly
- Leader of the Opposition in the Tamil Nadu Legislative Assembly
- List of leaders of the house in the Tamil Nadu Legislative Assembly
