= Department of Municipal Administration and Water Supply (Tamil Nadu) =

Government department of Tamil Nadu state, India

Agency overview
- Jurisdiction: Tamil Nadu
- Headquarters: Chennai
- Minister responsible: C. Joseph Vijay, Minister of Municipal Administration and Water Supply Department
- Agency executive: Gagandeep Sing Bedi, IAS, Additional Chief Secretary, Municipal Administration and Water Supply
- Parent agency: Government of Tamil Nadu
- Website: Municipal Administration and Water Supply Department

The Department of Municipal Administration and Water Supply is one of the departments of Government of Tamil Nadu.

== Objective ==
The department is responsible for the development of urban areas in the state and ensuring water supply to all the areas. The department acts through urban local bodies such as municipal corporations, municipalities and town panchayats to enable the same.

== Administrative divisions ==
The local administration under the department consists of 25 municipal corporations, 138 municipalities and 491 town panchayats. Greater Chennai Corporation, established in 1688, is the second oldest in the world and Tamil Nadu was the first state to establish town panchayats as a new administrative unit.

== Sub-divisions ==
The following sub-divisions operate under the department:

- Greater Chennai Corporation (GCC): Administration and infrastructure development, taxation in Chennai
- Directorate of Municipal Administration (DMA): Administration and infrastructure development, taxation in municipalities and other municipal corporations
- Directorate of Town Panchayats (DTP): Administration and infrastructure development, revenue, water supply and sanitation in town panchayats
- Chennai Metropolitan Water Supply and Sewerage Board (CMWSSB): water supply and sanitation in Chennai
- Tamil Nadu Water Supply and Drainage Board (TWAD): Water supply and sanitation in other urban bodies
- Tamil Nadu Urban Infrastructure Financial Services Limited (TNUIFSL): Financing for urban infrastructure development
- Chennai Rivers Restoration Trust (CRRT): Restoration of water bodies in Chennai metropolitan area
- Tamil Nadu Urban Finance and Infrastructure Development Corporation (TUFIDCO): Implementation of urban development projects and schemes including Smart Cities Mission and AMRUT
- New Tirupur Area Development Corporation (NTADC): Development of New Tiruppur area
- Tamil Nadu Water Investment Company (TNWIC): Implementation of sewerage systems, recycling, desalination, river restoration and industrial effluent management

== See also ==
- Government of Tamil Nadu
- Tamil Nadu Government's Departments
