= M. K. Stalin =

Indian politician (born 1953)

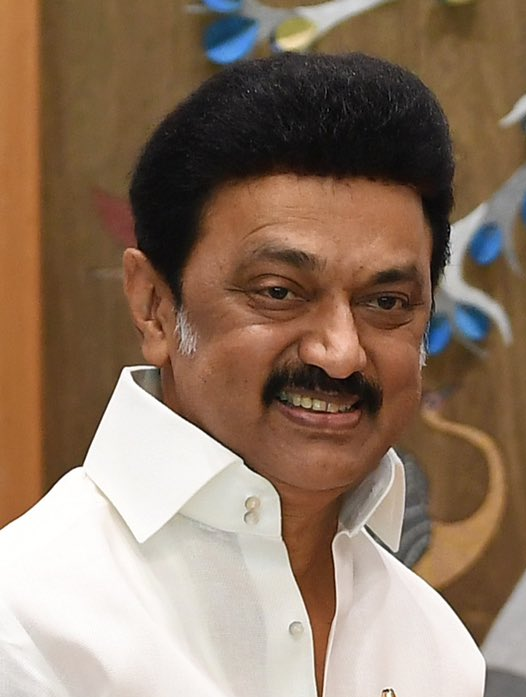
- Stalin in 2022

8th Chief Minister of Tamil Nadu
- In office 7 May 2021 – 9 May 2026
- Governor: Banwarilal Purohit; R. N. Ravi; Rajendra Arlekar
- Deputy: Udhayanidhi Stalin
- Cabinet: Stalin ministry
- Preceded by: Edappadi K. Palaniswami
- Succeeded by: C. Joseph Vijay
Additional ministries
Ministry and Departments	Public; General Administration; Indian Administrative Service; Indian Police Service; Indian Forest Service; District Revenue Officers; Police; Home; Special Initiatives; Special Programme Implementation; Welfare of Differently Abled Persons

1st Deputy Chief Minister of Tamil Nadu
- In office 29 May 2009 – 15 May 2011
- Governor: Surjit Singh Barnala
- Chief Minister: M. Karunanidhi
Portfolios
Ministry and Departments	General Administration; District Revenue Officers; Industries; Minorities Welfare; Social Reforms; Municipal Administration and Water Supply; Passports; Poverty Alleviation Programmes; Rural Development and Panchayat Raj; Special Initiatives
- Preceded by: Office established
- Succeeded by: O. Panneerselvam (in 2017)

17th Leader of the Opposition in the Tamil Nadu Legislative Assembly
- In office 24 May 2016 – 6 May 2021
- Governor: Konijeti Rosaiah; C. Vidyasagar Rao; Banwarilal Purohit
- Chief Minister: J. Jayalalithaa; O. Panneerselvam; Edappadi K Palaniswami
- Preceded by: Vijayakanth
- Succeeded by: Edappadi K. Palaniswami

Cabinet Minister in Tamil Nadu
- In office 13 May 2006 – 15 May 2011
- Minister: Rural Development and Panchayati Raj
- Chief Minister: M. Karunanidhi
- Preceded by: K. P. Anbalagan
- Succeeded by: P. Mohan

2nd President of Dravida Munnetra Kazhagam
- Incumbent
- Assumed office 28 August 2018
- General Secretary: K. Anbazhagan; Durai Murugan
- Preceded by: M. Karunanidhi

Working President of Dravida Munnetra Kazhagam
- In office 4 January 2017 – 28 August 2018
- President: M. Karunanidhi
- Preceded by: Position established
- Succeeded by: Position abolished

Treasurer of Dravida Munnetra Kazhagam
- In office 27 December 2008 – 27 August 2018
- President: M. Karunanidhi
- General Secretary: K. Anbazhagan
- Preceded by: Arcot N. Veeraswami
- Succeeded by: Durai Murugan

Deputy General Secretary of Dravida Munnetra Kazhagam
- In office 2 June 2003 – 26 December 2008
- President: M. Karunanidhi
- General Secretary: K. Anbazhagan
- Preceded by: Position established
- Succeeded by: Position abolished

45th Mayor of Chennai
- In office 25 October 1996 – 6 September 2002
- Preceded by: R. Arumugam (in 1973)
- Succeeded by: Karate R. Thiagarajan

Member of the Tamil Nadu Legislative Assembly
- In office 23 May 2011 – 4 May 2026
- Preceded by: Constituency established
- Succeeded by: V. S. Babu
- Constituency: Kolathur
- In office 13 May 1996 – 15 May 2011
- Preceded by: K. A. Krishnaswamy
- Succeeded by: B. Valarmathi
- Constituency: Thousand Lights
- In office 27 January 1989 – 30 January 1991
- Preceded by: K. A. Krishnaswamy
- Succeeded by: K. A. Krishnaswamy
- Constituency: Thousand Lights

Youth wing secretary of Dravida Munnetra Kazhagam
- In office 20 July 1982 – 6 July 2017
- President: M. Karunanidhi
- General Secretary: K. Anbazhagan
- Preceded by: Position established
- Succeeded by: M. P. Saminathan

Personal details
- Born: Muthuvel Karunanidhi Stalin; 1 March 1953 (age 73) Madras, India
- Party: Dravida Munnetra Kazhagam
- Spouse: Durga (m. 1975)
- Children: 2, including Udhayanidhi
- Parents: M. Karunanidhi (father); Dayalu Ammal (mother)
- Relatives: Karunanidhi family
- Education: Presidency College, Madras (B.A.)
- Website: mkstalin.in

Muthuvel Karunanidhi Stalin (Note: /stɑːlɪn, -lin/, Tamil pronunciation: ['mut̪ːuʋeːl kaɾuˈɳaːniði sʈaːˈlin]) (born 1 March 1953) is an Indian politician and statesman who served as the eighth chief minister of Tamil Nadu from 2021 to 2026. He became president of the Dravida Munnetra Kazhagam (DMK) on 28 August 2018, after serving as the party's working president from January 2017 to August 2018.

Stalin is the third son of former Tamil Nadu chief minister M. Karunanidhi. He completed his education at Presidency College, Madras, in 1973. He began his political career in the late 1960s and was elected to the DMK's general committee in 1973. He was jailed during the Emergency in 1976. He became the secretary of the party's youth wing in 1982, a post he held for over three decades. He served as the Mayor of Chennai from 1996 to 2002. He has been elected to the Tamil Nadu Legislative Assembly eight times, and served as the state's first Deputy Chief Minister from 2009 to 2011.

Stalin is married to Durga, and their son Udhayanidhi served as the deputy chief minister of Tamil Nadu from 2024 to 2026. In 2009, Anna University conferred an honorary doctorate on Stalin. In 2025, The Indian Express named him as India's 23rd most powerful personality.

== Early and personal life ==
Muthuvel Karunanidhi Stalin was born on 1 March 1953 in Madras. He is the third son of M. Karunanidhi, who would later serve as Chief Minister of Tamil Nadu, and Dayalu Ammal. He was named after the Soviet leader Joseph Stalin. Stalin was educated at Madras Christian College Higher Secondary School. He completed a pre-university course at Vivekananda College and obtained a degree in history from Presidency College in 1973.

Stalin married Durga (alias Shantha) on 20 August 1975. They have two children: a son Udhayanidhi, who served as deputy chief minister of Tamil Nadu from 2024 till 2026. and daughter Senthamarai, an entrepreneur and education professional. Stalin describes himself as an atheist.

== Political career ==
=== Early career ===
Stalin began his political career in his early teens when he, with some friends, founded the youth wing of Dravida Munnetra Kazhagam (DMK) in Gopalapuram. At 14 years old, he campaigned for his uncle, Murasoli Maran, in the 1967 Madras State Legislative Assembly election. In 1973, he was elected to the general committee of the DMK.

In 1976, Stalin was jailed in Madras Central Prison under the Maintenance of Internal Security Act (MISA) for protesting against the Emergency. Whilst in police custody, he endured torture which resulted in the death of his fellow prisoner C. Chittibabu. He wrote his final-year college exams whilst in prison. Stalin remained in custody until the Emergency's end in March 1977, when he and other political prisoners were freed. Testifying before the Justice M. M. Ismail Commission, Stalin said he was beaten and kicked while in custody, and that he was held with several other inmates in a single cell. Counsel for the jail staff disputed these claims during the hearing.

=== Youth wing and MLA ===
Stalin established the youth wing of the DMK in 1980 and became its secretary in 1982, a post he held for more than four decades. During the 1980s, he travelled across Tamil Nadu to encourage and mentor youth to join active politics. In 1989, he was elected to the Tamil Nadu Legislative Assembly from Thousand Lights Assembly constituency, and represented the constituency five times. In 2003, he became Deputy General Secretary of the DMK.

=== Mayor of Chennai (1996–2002) ===
Stalin became the Mayor of Chennai in 1996. As mayor, he initiated the Singara Chennai (Beautiful Chennai) project to improve the city's infrastructure. He modernised the garbage disposal system by giving priority to cleaning works, and implemented development projects in areas such as health, public construction and schools. He built flyovers to address traffic congestion. During his first tenure, nine major flyovers and 49 bridges were constructed at a cost of ₹0.95 billion (US$10 million). He also worked on improving the standard of corporation-run schools to be on par with private schools. Parks and fountains were set up at 18 major junctions, 81 parks were renovated, and saplings were planted at Marina Beach. His efforts in improving city infrastructure earned him the title of Managara Thanthai (father of the city).

Stalin was re-elected Mayor for the second time in 2001. In 2002, the chief minister J. Jayalalithaa enacted the Tamil Nadu Municipal Laws (Amendment) Act, which prevented a person from holding two elected posts in the government. Because Stalin was an elected member of the legislative assembly, this law was widely seen as an attempt to remove him as Chennai's mayor. Madras High Court later struck down the law but held as per the City Municipal Corporation Act, 1919, a person cannot be mayor for two consecutive terms, though unlike Stalin, earlier mayors were not directly elected. As a result, Stalin resigned from the post.

=== Minister and deputy chief minister (2006–2011) ===
The DMK regained control of the state assembly in the 2006 assembly elections. Stalin became the minister for rural development and local administration in the Government of Tamil Nadu, and retained this office throughout his term. During his tenure, he expanded women's self-help groups across the state by establishing 175,493 new ones. He also established drinking water projects such as the Hogenakkal and Ramanathapuram water schemes. In 2008, he became the DMK's treasurer.

On 29 May 2009, the Governor of Tamil Nadu Surjit Singh Barnala appointed Stalin the state's deputy chief minister. During his tenure, on 23 February 2011, the Government of Tamil Nadu received a special award for the best state among the largest states in India, and the diamond state award for best state in civil safety, drinking water and sanitation, and women's development. The state also won the most number of Nirmal Gram Awards for its exceptional role in maintaining sanitation in villages during Stalin's tenure as the minister of rural development.

=== Opposition leader and DMK president (2016–2021) ===
In 2013, Karunanidhi announced Stalin as his successor to head the DMK and confirmed it in 2016. Ahead of the 2016 Tamil Nadu Legislative Assembly election, Stalin went on a statewide tour titled Namakku Naame. He won the Kolathur constituency and was appointed opposition leader in the state legislative assembly. In 2017, Stalin went on another Namakku Naame tour. He was appointed as working president in January 2017 when the health of his father, Karunanidhi, started declining. In 2018, Karunanidhi died and Stalin became president of the DMK.

Stalin formed the Secular Progressive Alliance in Tamil Nadu and led the alliance in the state in the 2019 Indian general election. The Secular Progressive Alliance won 39 out of 40 Parliament seats, and 12 out of 21 in the assembly by-elections, in the party's first victory since Stalin took charge as the DMK's president.

=== Chief Minister of Tamil Nadu (2021–2026) ===
Stalin led the campaign for the Secular Progressive Alliance in the 2021 Assembly elections; it won 159 seats out of the 234, with the DMK winning 133 seats, an absolute majority. He was sworn in as the chief minister of Tamil Nadu on 7 May 2021, along with the rest of his cabinet. He also served as a member of the business advisory committee and committee on rules in the 16th Tamil Nadu assembly.

After assuming office, Stalin implemented policies offering ₹4,000 (US$43) as one time COVID-19 relief to 20.7 million ration card holders across the state, free bus pass for travel in ordinary intra-city buses for women and reducing the retail price of Aavin milk. However, the Tamil Nadu Milk Producers Association claimed that the decision to reduce the retail milk prices caused a significant financial loss to Aavin, and urging the chief minister to increase the milk procurement rates. He established a new economic advisory council that included economists Arvind Subramanian, Esther Duflo, Jean Drèze, Raghuram Rajan, and S Narayan.

During the second wave of the COVID-19 pandemic in August 2021, Stalin established a war room to monitor the status of beds, ambulances, and oxygen supply. He visited the ESI medical college hospital against expert advice to meet up with patients getting treatment for COVID-19. The state had the lowest percentage of wastage of COVID-19 vaccines during the free public administration of the same. On 2 September 2021, actor and politician Chiranjeevi met with Stalin to commend him on governance efficacy, and stated that Stalin had proved his mettle in handling the pandemic.

Stalin released the state's first ever standalone agricultural budget on 14 August 2021. Later in the day, he handed appointment orders from the Hindu Religious and Charitable Endowments Department to trained aspirants of all castes as temple priests in August 2021, quoting that Periyar fought for equal rights in worship for all believers in God. On 29 August 2021, he announced that the name of refugee camps of Sri Lankan Tamils would be changed to rehabilitation camps.

In September 2021, Stalin announced Periyar's birthday would be celebrated annually as a 'Social Justice day'. Later in the month, his government withdrew over 5,570 legal cases filed by the previous government in the past ten years including cases against some journalists and those who were involved in protests against the new farm laws and the Citizenship Amendment Act promulgated by the union government, and various government projects such as Kaveri delta coal-bed methane project, India-based Neutrino Observatory, Kudankulam Nuclear Power Plant, and Chennai-Salem expressway (ta). Later in the month, the Madras High Court commended Stalin for his decision to distribute school bags printed with the photos of his predecessor, and not reprinting them. On 18 November 2021, Stalin announced that the state government will bear the expenses of emergency care for all vehicle accident victims for the first 48 hours. In December 2021, he unveiled a real-time dashboard, which provided relevant information from all the government departments to the chief minister.

In March 2022, Stalin launched the 'Naan Mudhalvan' scheme aimed at providing psychological counselling and medical advice to school students. In May 2022, he welcomed the release of A. G. Perarivalan, who was convicted for the assassination of former prime minister Rajiv Gandhi. On 5 September 2022, he launched a women education support programme titled 'Pudhumai Penn', which offered a monthly stipend of ₹1,000 (US$11) to girls who had completed their schooling in state government schools during their graduation or diploma. The same was extended to boys later under the name of 'Tamil Pudhalavan' scheme on 14 June 2024. On 15 September 2022, his government extended the midday meal scheme in government schools to cover breakfast. Later in the month, he launched the Green Tamil Nadu Mission aimed at increasing the green cover in the state from 23.7% to 33% in the next ten years.

In September 2023, Stalin launched a women's welfare scheme titled 'Magalir Urimai Thittam', which provided a stipend of ₹1,000 (US$11) per month to all women aged 21 years and above, provided their annual household income is less than ₹0.25 million (US$2,700). Following the announcement earlier in 2021 that the state government planned to establish TIDEL neo Parks, information technology parks, at various places across Tamil Nadu, the first such park was opened in 2024. In March 2025, Stalin opposed the proposed three-language formula in schools under the National Education Policy, stating that there is "no place for Hindi" in Tamil Nadu.

On 4 August 2025, Stalin inaugurated a manufacturing plant of the Vietnamese electric vehicle company, VinFast, at Thoothukudi, with an investment of US$2 billion. In December 2025, the state reported a nominal Gross State Domestic Product of ₹319 billion (US$3.4 billion) at current prices for the financial year 2024–25, registering a 16% y-o-y growth. The real GSDP grew by 11.19%, the first time in 14 years that it had increased by more than ten percent. In February 2026, the Tamil Nadu economic survey projected that the state can become a US$1 trillion economy by 2031, in line with the state government's vision 2030.

On 5 January 2026, the state government announced the re-launch of free laptop distribution scheme for state-run college students, which had been discontinued during the previous government. As per the 2021 Manifesto proposed by Stalin and following protests from state government employees to restore the Old Pension Scheme, which was discontinued in 2003, the government announced the introduction of a new assured pension scheme in January 2026. On 9 February 2026, Stalin inaugurated a Tata Motors and Jaguar Land Rover multi-energy vehicle plant in Ranipet, built at a cost of approximately US$1.1 billion (₹9,000 crore).

In April 2026, the union government introduced a constitutional amendment bill to implement a reservation of one third of seats in the Indian parliament and state legislative assemblies to women based on the 2011 census rather than the 2027 census, increase the number of seats in the Lok Sabha from 543 to 850 seats, and carry out a new delimitation of electoral constituencies. Stalin opposed the proposed amendment and called for protests, stating that it would reduce the representation of southern states in parliament due to their comparatively lower population growth compared to the northern states. However, while the union government verbally proposed a guarantee of 50% pro-rata increase uniformly for all states, which would have marginally improved the proportion of representation of southern states, the opposition protested the failure to include such terms in the original draft, and the coupling of women's reservation with the delimitation bill, and the bill was subsequently defeated in the Lok Sabha on 17 April 2026. For 2025–26, the real GSDP real economy growth rate was reported at 10.83% per the data released by the Union Ministry of Statistics and Programme Implementation.

Following the defeat of the Stalin-led Secular Progressive Alliance in the 2026 Tamil Nadu Legislative Assembly election, Stalin submitted his resignation as the chief minister on 4 May 2026.

=== Electoral performance ===
Stalin unsuccessfully contested the 1984 Tamil Nadu Legislative Assembly election, standing for the Thousand Lights constituency in Chennai, to which he was first elected in 1989. In 1991, he contested the same seat for the third time and lost. He had been elected to the assembly consecutively six times since 1996. In the 2026 assembly election, he lost to V. S. Babu of the Tamilaga Vettri Kazhagam from Kolathur, a seat he had held since 2011. He became the first incumbent chief minister to lose the assembly elections in the state since Jayalalithaa in 1996.

Tamil Nadu Legislative Assembly election
Year	Constituency	Party	Votes	%	Opponent	Party	Opponent Votes	%	Result	Margin	%
2026	Kolathur	DMK	74,202	40.32	V. S. Babu	TVK	82,997	45.09	Lost	-8,795	-4.77
2021	Kolathur	DMK	1,05,522	60.86	Aadi Rajaram	AIADMK	35,138	20.27	Won	70,384	40.59
2016	Kolathur	DMK	91,303	54.25	J. C. D. Prabhakar	AIADMK	53,573	31.83	Won	37,730	22.42
2011	Kolathur	DMK	68,677	48.35	Saidai Duraisamy	AIADMK	65,943	46.43	Won	2,734	1.92
2006	Thousand Lights	DMK	49,817	46.00	Aadi Rajaram	AIADMK	47,349	43.72	Won	2,468	2.28
2001	Thousand Lights	DMK	49,056	51.41	S. Sekar	TMC(M)	41,782	43.78	Won	7,274	7.63
1996	Thousand Lights	DMK	66,905	69.72	Zeenath Sheriffdeen	AIADMK	22,028	22.05	Won	44,877	47.67
1991	Thousand Lights	DMK	38,445	39.19	K. A. Krishnaswamy	AIADMK	55,426	56.50	Lost	-16,981	-17.31
1989	Thousand Lights	DMK	50,818	50.59	Thambidurai	AIADMK	30,184	30.05	Won	20,634	20.54
1984	Thousand Lights	DMK	43,954	47.86	K. A. Krishnaswamy	AIADMK	46,246	50.36	Lost	-2,292	-2.50

== Public image and perception ==
In August 2021, Stalin was ranked first among chief ministers of India in the India Today "Mood of the Nation" survey. The Indian Express named Stalin as India's 24th most powerful personality in 2022, and 23rd in 2025.

== Awards and accolades ==
On 1 August 2009, Anna University conferred upon Stalin an honorary doctorate for his contributions to governance and community development. The Kentucky Colonel Award, the highest award given by the Commonwealth of Kentucky in the United States, was given to Stalin for his public service. He was also honoured as Kentucky's goodwill ambassador.

== Filmography ==
=== Films ===
Year	Title	Role	Notes	Ref.
1978	Nambikkai Natchathram	—N/a	As co-producer; starring M. K. Muthu	
1987	Ore Raththam	Nandhakumar	Written by M. Karunanidhi	
1988	Makkal Aanayittal	Himself	Written by M. Karunanidhi; Special appearance in the song "Aara Amara"	

=== Television ===
Year	Title	Role	Notes	Ref.
1990	Kurinji Malar	Aravindhan	13 part series on Doordarshan	
	Suriya			

== See also ==
- 2026 Tamil Nadu Legislative Assembly election – Indian election

== Notes ==
Party political offices
Preceded by M. Karunanidhi	Leader of Dravida Munnetra Kazhagam; 28 August 2018 – Present	Incumbent
