= Meyyanathan Siva V =

Indian politician

Member of the Tamil Nadu Legislative Assembly
- Incumbent
- Assumed office 11 May 2026
- Constituency: Alangudi
- In office 11 May 2021 – 5 May 2026
- In office 2016–2021

Personal details
- Party: Dravida Munnetra Kazhagam

Meyyanathan V is a Tamil Nadu politician from the Dravida Munnetra Kazhagam. He has been elected twice from the Alangudi assembly constituency. During the 2021 elections, he won by 25,847 votes and defeated Dharma Thangavel, who was from the All India Anna Dravida Munnetra Kazhagam. In the current Tamil Nadu Ministry, he is the Backward Classes welfare Minister.

== Electoral performance ==
Election	Constituency	Political party	Result	Vote %	Opposition			Ref
Election	Constituency	Political party	Result	Vote %	Candidate	Political party	Vote %	Ref
2016	Alangudi	DMK	Won	46.17%	Gnana Kalaiselvan	AIADMK	39.88%	
2021	Alangudi	DMK	Won	51.38%	Dharma Thangavel	AIADMK	36.28%	-
2026	Alangudi	DMK	Won	35.98%	Kandasamy	TVK	28.78%	-
