= List of agencies of the government of Tamil Nadu =

Tamil Nadu Government's Organisations

Government Organisations overview
- Jurisdiction: Tamil Nadu
- Headquarters: Chennai
- Website: http://www.tn.gov.in/contact_type/5/All/5

Tamil Nadu Government Organisations are the commercial and non-commercial establishments in the Indian state of Tamil Nadu by Government of Tamil Nadu. This includes the state-run PSUs, Statutory corporations and co-operative societies. These commercial institutions are vital to the economic growth of this state. They generated a revenue of ₹425350.7 million for the fiscal year 2008–09. Following is the list of various governmental agencies of the state.

== Preface ==
Tamil Nadu Government Organisations are different types & under the control of different departments as follows:

- Public Sector Undertaking (PSU) registered under the Companies Act, 1956
- Apex cooperative societies registered under the Tamil Nadu Societies Registration Act, 1975
- Statutory corporation incorporated and running as per Tamil Nadu Government's Act, Regulations, Rules

== Working organisations ==
=== Agriculture and allied sectors ===
Sl. No	Company	Incorporated	Headquarters	Parent department	Role	Type	Remarks	Website
1	Tamil Nadu State Agricultural Marketing Board (TNSAMB)	1970	Chennai	Department of Agriculture (Tamil Nadu)	Agricultural Market Regulator	Statutory Corporation		www.tnsamb.gov.in
2	Tamil Nadu Horticulture Development Agency (TANHODA)	2004	Chennai	Horticulture and Plantation Crops Department	Horticultural Schemes Implementation	Nodal Agency		www.tanhoda.gov.in
3	Tamil Nadu Horticultural Producers Co-operative Enterprises Limited (TANHOPE)	1995	Chennai	Horticulture and Plantation Crops Department	Horticultural Farmers Betterment & Products Marketing	Co-operative society		www.tanhoda.gov.in
4	Tamil Nadu Co-operative Milk Producers' Federation Limited (AAVIN)	1981	Chennai	Animal Husbandry, Dairying and Fisheries	Milk and allied products Production	Co-operative society		www.aavinmilk.com
5	Tamil Nadu Livestock Development Agency (TNLDA)	2003	Chennai	Animal Husbandry, Dairying and Fisheries	Livestock quality Development & Enrichment	Nodal Agency		Website
6	Tamil Nadu Fisheries Development Corporation Limited (TNFDC)	1974	Chennai	Animal Husbandry, Dairying and Fisheries	Reservoir Fisheries Development	State Govt. Undertaking		Website
7	Tamil Nadu State Apex Fisheries Cooperative Federation Limited (TAFCOFED)	1991	Chennai	Animal Husbandry, Dairying and Fisheries	Marine Fisheries Development	Co-operative society		Website
8	Tamil Nadu Watershed Development Agency (TAWDEVA)			Department of Agriculture (Tamil Nadu)		Co-operative society		http://tawdeva.in/

=== Community welfare ===
Sl. No	Organisation Name	Incorporated	Headquarters	Parent department	Role	Type	Remarks	Website
1	Tamil Nadu Adi Dravidar Housing and Development Corporation Limited (TAHDCO)	1974	Chennai	Adi Dravidar and Tribal Welfare	Socioeconomic/Skill Development and Housing for SC/ST people	State Govt. Undertaking		www.tahdco.tn.gov.in
2	Tamil Nadu Backward Classes Economic Development Corporation (TABCEDCO)	1981	Chennai	Backward Classes, Most Backward Classes and Minorities Welfare	Economic Betterment for BC/MBC/DNC people	State Govt. Undertaking		
3	Tamil Nadu Wakf Board	1958	Chennai	Backward Classes, Most Backward Classes and Minorities Welfare	Wakf Administration	State Govt. Undertaking		www.tnwakfboard.org
4	Tamil Nadu State Hajj Committee	1958	Chennai	Backward Classes, Most Backward Classes and Minorities Welfare	Hajj Pilgrimage Orientation	State Govt. Undertaking		www.hajjtn.in
5	Tamil Nadu Minorities Economic Development Corporation Limited (TAMCO)	1999	Chennai	Backward Classes, Most Backward Classes and Minorities Welfare	Socioeconomic Development of Minority people	State Govt. Undertaking		Website
6	Tamil Nadu Corporation For Development of Women Limited (TANCDW)	1983	Chennai	Rural Development & Panchayat Raj	Women Empowerment	State Govt. Undertaking		www.tamilnaduwomen.org
7	Dharmapuri District Socio Economic Development Society (DDSEDS)		Chennai					
8	Vanniyar Public Property Welfare Board		Chennai				Backward Classes, Most Backward Classes and Minorities Welfare	www.tn.gov.in/vppwb/
9	Non-Resident Tamils' Welfare Board	13 December 2010	Chennai				Public	
10	Tamil Nadu Rural Housing and Infrastructure Development Corporation Limited (TN Rural Housing)							

=== Labour and employment ===
Sl. No	Company	Incorporated	Headquarters	Parent department	Role	Type	Remarks	Website
1	Tamil Nadu Public Service Commission (TNPSC)		Chennai					http://www.tnpsc.gov.in/
2	Tamil Nadu Powerloom Weaving Workers Welfare Board		Chennai					
3	Tamil Nadu Footwear, Leathers Goods Manufactory and Tannery Workers Welfare Board		Chennai					
4	Tamil Nadu Artists Welfare Board		Chennai					
5	Tamil Nadu Goldsmiths Welfare Board		Chennai					
6	Tamil Nadu Pottery Workers Welfare Board		Chennai					
7	Overseas Manpower Corporation Limited (OMC)	1978	Chennai	Labour and Employment	Overseas Manpower Outsourcing	State Govt. Undertaking		www.omcmanpower.com
8	Tamil Nadu Ex-Servicemen Corporation Limited (TEXCO)	1986	Chennai	Public	Ex-Servicemen Rehabilitation	State Govt. Undertaking		www.texco.in
9	Tamil Nadu Construction Workers Welfare Board	1974	Chennai	Department of Labour and Employment (Tamil Nadu)		State Govt. Welfare		
10	Tamil Nadu Manual Workers Social Security and Welfare Board		Chennai			State Govt. Undertaking		
11	Tamil Nadu State Advisory Contract Labour Board		Chennai					
12	Tamil Nadu Plantation Labour Housing Advisory Board		Chennai					
13	Tamil Nadu State Labour Advisory Board		Chennai					
14	Tamil Nadu Washermen Welfare Board		Chennai					
15	Tamil Nadu Hairdressers Welfare Board		Chennai					
16	Tamil Nadu Auto Rickshaw and Taxi Drivers Welfare Board		Chennai					
17	Tamil Nadu Domestic Workers Welfare Board		Chennai	Labour and Employment				
18	Tamil Nadu Tailoring Workers Welfare Board							
19	Tamil Nadu Handicrafts Workers Welfare Board		Chennai	Department of Labour and Employment (Tamil Nadu)		State Govt. Welfare		
20	Tamil Nadu Palm Tree Workers Welfare Board		Chennai	Department of Labour and Employment (Tamil Nadu)		State Govt. Undertaking		
21	Tamil Nadu Handlooms and Handloom Silk Weavers Welfare Board		Chennai					
22	Tamil Nadu Skill Development Corporation Limited (TNSDC)	2013	Chennai	Labour and Employment	Skill Development	State Govt. Undertaking		www.tnskill.tn.gov.in

=== Energy ===
Sl. No	Company	Incorporated	Headquarters	Parent department	Role	Type	Remarks	Website
1	TNEB Limited	2010	Chennai	Department of Energy (Tamil Nadu)	Electricity Services	Statutory Corporation	Restructured from erstwhile TNEB (Estd.1957)	www.tnebltd.gov.in
2	Tamil Nadu Power Generation Corporation Limited	2024	Chennai	Department of Energy (Tamil Nadu)	Electricity Generation	Subsidiary of TNEB Limited	Restructured from erstwhile TANGEDCO	www.tnpgcl.org
3	Tamil Nadu Power Distribution Corporation Limited	2024	Chennai	Department of Energy (Tamil Nadu)	Electricity Distribution	Subsidiary of TNEB Limited	Restructured from erstwhile TANGEDCO	www.tnpdcl.org
4	Tamil Nadu Transmission Corporation Limited	2010	Chennai	Department of Energy (Tamil Nadu)	Electricity Transmission	Subsidiary of TNEB Limited	Restructured from erstwhile TNEB	www.tantransco.gov.in
5	Tamil Nadu Green Energy Corporation Limited	2024	Chennai	Department of Energy (Tamil Nadu)	New and Renewable Energy Promotion	Subsidiary of TNEB Limited	Restructured from erstwhile TANGEDCO and Absorbed TEDA	www.tngecl.org
6	Tamil Nadu Electricity Regulatory Commission	17 March 1999	Chennai	Department of Energy (Tamil Nadu)		Regulatory Body		www.tnerc.tn.nic.in
7	Tamil Nadu Electrical Licensing Board	16 November 1955	Chennai	Department of Energy (Tamil Nadu)		Licensing Body		www.tnelb.gov.in

=== Finance ===
Sl. No	Company	Incorporated	Headquarters	Parent department	Role	Type	Remarks	Website
1	Tamil Nadu Transport Development Finance Corporation Limited	1975	Chennai	Transport	Transport Capital & Working Finance	State Govt. Undertaking	NBFC	www.tdfc.in
2	Tamil Nadu Industrial Investment Corporation Limited (TIIC)	1949	Chennai	Industries	Industries Investment Finance	State Govt. Undertaking		www.tiic.org
3	Tamil Nadu Power Finance and Infrastructure Development Corporation Limited (POWERFIN)	1991	Chennai	Energy	Electricity Finance	State Govt. Body	NBFC	www.tnpowerfinance.com
4	Tamil Nadu Urban Finance and Infrastructure Development Corporation Limited (TUFIDCO)	1990	Chennai	Municipal Administration and Water Supply	Urban Infrastructure Finance	State Govt. Undertaking	Nodal Agency	Website
5	Tamil Nadu Urban Infrastructure Financial Services Limited (TNUIFSL)	1996	Chennai	Municipal Administration and Water Supply	Urban Infrastructure Finance and Solutions	State Govt. Undertaking		www.tnudf.com
6	Tamil Nadu State Apex Co-operative Bank	26 November 1905	Chennai		Banking	Co-operative Body	NBFC	www.tnscbank.com
7	Tamil Nadu Industrial Cooperative Bank Limited - TAICO Bank	13 September 1961	Chennai		Banking	Co-operative Body		www.taicobank.com/aboutus.htm
8	Tamil Nadu Co-operative State Agriculture & Rural Development Bank		Chennai		Banking	Co-operative Body		
9	Tamil Nadu Infrastructure Fund Management Corporation Limited (TN Infra Management)							

=== Food and co-operation ===
Sl. No	Company	Incorporated	Headquarters	Parent department	Role	Type	Remarks	Website
1	The Tamil Nadu Civil Supplies Corporation (TNCSC)	1956	Chennai	Co-operation, Food and Consumer Protection	PDS	State Govt. Undertaking		www.tncsc.tn.gov.in
2	The Tamil Nadu Cooperative Marketing Federation Limited (TANFED)	1959	Chennai	Co-operation, Food and Consumer Protection	Food Processing	Co-operative society		www.tanfed.tn.gov.in
3	Tamil Nadu Warehousing Corporation	1958	Chennai	Co-operation, Food and Consumer Protection	Storage & Warehousing	Statutory Corporation		Website
4	Tamil Nadu Consumers Cooperative Federation Limited (TNCCF)	1958	Chennai	Co-operation, Food and Consumer Protection	Retail	Co-operative society		Website
5	Tamil Nadu Cooperative Union (TNCU)	4 January 1914	Chennai	Co-operation, Food and Consumer Protection	Retail	Co-operative society		www.tncu.tn.gov.in/

=== Forestry ===
Sl. No	Company	Incorporated	Headquarters	Parent department	Role	Type	Remarks	Website
1	Arasu Rubber Corporation Limited	1984	Nagercoil	Environment and Forest	Rubber Plantation	State Govt. Undertaking		www.arasurubber.tn.nic.in
2	Tamil Nadu Forest Plantation Corporation Limited (TAFCORN)	1974	Tiruchirappalli	Environment and Forest	Forest Plantation	State Govt. Undertaking		www.tafcorn.tn.gov.in
3	Tamil Nadu Tea Plantation Corporation (TANTEA)	1968	The Nilgiris	Environment and Forest	Tea Plantation	State Govt. Undertaking		www.tantea.co.in
4	Tamil Nadu Biodiversity Conservation And Greening Society (TNBCGS)			Environment and Forest	Tea Plantation	State Govt. Undertaking		www.tantea.co.in
5	Tamil Nadu Pollution Control Board (TNPCB)			Environment and Forest	Pollution control	statuory corporation		Get Set Go
6	Adyar Poonga			Environment and Forest	Ecological Park	State Govt. Undertaking		

=== Industrial promotion ===
Sl. No	Company	Incorporated	Headquarters	Department	Role	Type	Remarks	Website
1	State Industries Promotion Corporation of Tamil Nadu Limited (SIPCOT)	1972	Chennai	Industries	Large & Medium scale Industries Promotion	State Govt. Body		www.sipcot.com
2	Tamil Nadu Industrial Development Corporation Limited (TIDCO)	1965	Chennai	Industries	Industrial Infrastructure Services/Finances	State Govt. Undertaking	NBFC	tidco.tn.gov.in
3	Tamil Nadu Small Industries Development Corporation Limited (SIDCO)	1970	Chennai	Micro, Small and Medium Enterprises	Small-scale Industries Promotion	State Govt. Undertaking		www.sidco.tn.nic.in
4	Tamil Nadu Industrial Guidance and Export Promotion Bureau (Guidance Tamil Nadu)	1992	Chennai	Industries	Investment Attraction & Documentation, Export Promotion	State Govt. Body		www.investingintamilnadu.com
5	Electronics Corporation of Tamil Nadu Limited (ELCOT)	1977	Chennai	Information Technology	Electronics & IT Industries Promotion, e-Governance	State Govt. Undertaking		www.elcot.in
6	ITCOT Limited (Industrial and Technical Consultancy Organisation of Tamil Nadu)	1979	Chennai	Industries	Industrial and Technical Consultancy Services	JV of Govt. of Tamil Nadu & Leading Financial Institutions		www.itcot.com
7	TIDEL Park Limited (TIDEL, Chennai)	2000	Chennai	Industries	Information Technology Park	TIDEL Park Ltd., a joint venture of TIDCO and ELCOT		www.tidelpark.com
8	Nilakottai Food Park Limited (Nilakottai)			Industries	Food Park			
9	Guindy Industrial Estate Infrastructure Upgradation Company (Guindy Industrial Estate)		Chennai	Industries	Large & Medium scale Industries Promotion	State Govt. Body		
10	TICEL Bio Park Limited (TICEL Bio Park)		Chennai	Industries	Bio Park	State Govt. Body		

=== Industries ===
Sl. No	Company	Incorporated	Headquarters	Parent department	Role	Type	Remarks	Website	Share Holding
1	Tamil Nadu Newsprint and Papers Limited (TNPL)	1984	Chennai	Industries	Newsprint, Printing & Writing paper manufacture from Bagasse	State Govt. Undertaking		www.tnpl.com	Presently Government of Tamil Nadu holds 35.32% of Equity shares in TNPL as of 31 March 2012 as per
2	Tamil Nadu Cement Corporation Limited (TANCEM)	1976	Chennai	Industries	Manufacture of Cements, Asbestos Sheets & Stone Ware Pipes	State Govt. Undertaking		www.tancem.in	
3	Tamil Nadu Magnesite Limited (TANMAG)	1979	Salem	Industries	Magnesite Mining	State Govt. Undertaking		www.tn.gov.in/tanmag	
4	Tamil Nadu Industrial Explosives Limited (TEL)	1983	Chennai	Industries	Manufacture of Industrial Explosives	State Govt. Undertaking		www.tniel.net	
5	Tamil Nadu Minerals Limited (TAMIN)	1978	Chennai	Industries	Exploitation, Processing & Marketing of Minerals	State Govt. Undertaking		www.tamingranites.com	
6	Tamil Nadu Small Industries Corporation Limited (TANSI)	1965	Chennai	Micro, Small and Medium Enterprises	Small-scale Industrial units	State Govt. Undertaking		www.tansi.tn.gov.in	
7	Tamil Nadu Co-operative Sugar Federation (TNCSF)	1961	Chennai	Industries	Sugar Mills	Co-operative Society		www.tncsf.net.in	
8	Tamil Nadu Sugar Corporation Limited (TASCO)	1974	Chennai	Industries	Sugar Mills Promotion	State Govt. Undertaking	Perambalur Sugar Mills Limited -subsidiary company	www.tasco.net.in	
9	Tamil Nadu Salt Corporation Limited (TNSC)	1974	Chennai	Industries	Salt Production	State Govt. Undertaking		www.tnsalt.com	
10	Southern Structurals Limited (SSL)	1956	Chennai	Industries	Engineering, Manufacturing & Services	State Govt. Undertaking	Acquired by Govt. of Tamil Nadu in 1971	Website	
11	Tamil Nadu Paints And Allied Products Limited (TAPAP)	1963	Chennai	Micro, Small and Medium Enterprises	Paints And Allied Products Manufacture	Subsidiary of TANSI		Website	
12	Tamil Nadu Polymer Industries Park Limited (TNPIP LIMITED)								
13	Madurai Thoothukudi Industrial Corridor Development Corporation Limited (MTICD Limited)								

=== Infrastructure ===
Sl. No	Company	Incorporated	Headquarters	Parent department	Role	Type	Remarks	Websites
1	Tamil Nadu Housing Board (TNHB)	1961	Chennai	Housing and Urban Development	Housing Services	Statutory Corporation		www.tnhb.gov.in
2	Tamil Nadu Water Supply and Drainage Board (TWAD)	1971	Chennai	Municipal Administration and Water Supply	Provision of Water and Sewerage facilities	Statutory Corporation		www.twadboard.gov.in
3	Tamil Nadu Police Housing Corporation (TNPHC)	1981	Chennai	Home, Prohibition and Excise	Housing Services for Police, Prison & Fire services personnel	State Govt. Undertaking		www.tnphc.com
4	Chennai Metropolitan Development Authority (CMDA)	1972	Chennai	Housing and Urban Development	Chennai Metro Planning Services	Statutory Corporation		www.cmdachennai.gov.in
5	Chennai Metropolitan Water Supply and Sewage Board (CMWSSB)	1978	Chennai	Municipal Administration and Water Supply	Provision of Water and Sewerage facilities to Chennai Metropolitan Area	Statutory Corporation		www.chennaimetrowater.tn.nic.in
6	Tamil Nadu Slum Clearance Board (TNSCB)	1970	Chennai	Housing and Urban Development	Rehabilitation of urban slums	Statutory Corporation		www.tnscb.org.in
7	New Tirupur Area Development Corporation Limited	1995	Chennai	Municipal Administration and Water Supply	Tirupur Area Development Programme	JV of Govt. of Tamil Nadu & Infrastructure Leasing and Financial Services Limited		www.ntadcl.com
8	Tamil Nadu Road Development Company Limited (TNRDC)	1998	Chennai	Highways and Minor Ports	Road Infrastructure Finance & Development	JV of TIDCO & Govt. of Tamil Nadu		www.tnhighways.org/tnrdc.htm
9	Tamil Nadu Road Infrastructure Development Corporation	2005	Chennai	Highways and Minor Ports	Road Infrastructure Development in Industrial Clusters	State Govt. Undertaking		Website
10	Tamil Nadu State Construction Corporation Limited	2005	Chennai	Public Works	Construction	State Govt. Undertaking		[www.tn.gov.in/departments/pwd.html Website]
11	IT Expressway Limited ( ITEL )		Chennai	Roadways	Housing Services	Joint Venture of TIDCO and TIDEL		www.itel.tnrdc.com

=== Medicine ===
Sl. No	Company	Incorporated	Headquarters	Parent department	Role	Type	Remarks	Website
1	Tamil Nadu Medical Services Corporation Limited (TNMSC)	1994	Chennai	Health and Family Welfare	Medicinal Drugs Management	State Govt. Undertaking		www.tnmsc.com
2	Tamil Nadu Medical Plant Farms & Herbal Medicine Corporation Limited (TAMPCOL)	1983	Chennai	Health and Family Welfare	Siddha & Herbal Products Manufacture	State Govt. Undertaking		www.tampcol.in
3	Tamil Nadu State AIDS Control Society (TANSACS)	1993	Chennai	Health and Family Welfare	Combatant of AIDS	State Govt. Society		www.tansacs.in
4	Tamil Nadu State Medicinal Plant Board		Chennai	Health and Family Welfare		State Govt. Society		www.tnsmpb.tn.gov.in
5	Transplant Authority of Tamil Nadu (TRANSTAN)	2014	Chennai	Health and Family Welfare	Organ transplantation	State Govt. Undertaking		transtan.tn.gov.in

=== Rural industries ===
Sl. No	Company	Incorporated	Headquarters	Parent department	Role	Type	Remarks	Website
1	The Tamil Nadu Handicrafts Development Corporation Limited (Poompuhar)	1973	Chennai	Handlooms, Handicrafts, Textiles and Khadi	Training, Sales, Production of Handicrafts	State Govt. Undertaking		www.poompuhar.org
2	Tamil Nadu Khadi and Village Industries Board (Khadi Kraft)	1960	Chennai	Handlooms, Handicrafts, Textiles and Khadi	Cottage Industries Promotion & Marketing	Statutory Corporation		Website
3	Tamil Nadu Palm Products Development Board	1995	Chennai	Handlooms, Handicrafts, Textiles and Khadi	Palm Products Promotion & Marketing	State Govt. Undertaking		Website
4	Tamil Nadu State Palmgur and Fibre Marketing Cooperative Federation	1995	Chennai	Handlooms, Handicrafts, Textiles and Khadi	Palm Products Production	Co-operative society		Website
5	Tamil Nadu Co-operative Silk Producers Federation Limited (TANSILK)	1978	Kanchipuram	Handlooms, Handicrafts, Textiles and Khadi	Silk Purchase	Co-operative Society		Website

=== Textiles ===
Sl. No	Company	Incorporated	Headquarters	Department	Role	Type	Remarks	Website
1	The Tamil Nadu Handloom Weavers' Co-operative Society Limited (Co-optex)	1935	Chennai	Handlooms, Handicrafts, Textiles and Khadi	Purchase & Supply of Yarns to Co-operative societies, Procurement & Marketing of Products from Co-operative societies	Co-operative society		www.cooptex.com
2	Tamil Nadu Handloom Development Corporation Limited (THDC)	1964	Chennai	Handlooms, Handicrafts, Textiles and Khadi	Handloom Finance	State Govt. Undertaking		Website
3	Tamil Nadu Textile Corporation Limited	1969	Coimbatore	Handlooms, Handicrafts, Textiles and Khadi	Cloth Production (Powerloom)	State Govt. Undertaking		www.tanfab.in
4	Tamil Nadu Zari Limited	1971	Kancheepuram	Handlooms, Handicrafts, Textiles and Khadi	Gold Lace Production for Sarees	State Govt. Undertaking		
5	Tamil Nadu Co-operative Textile Processing Mills Limited (TCTP)	1973	Erode	Handlooms, Handicrafts, Textiles and Khadi	Textile Processing	Co-operative society		Website
6	Tamil Nadu Co-operative Spinning Mills Federation Limited (TANSPIN)	1994	Chennai	Handlooms, Handicrafts, Textiles and Khadi	Procurement & Supply of Cotton	Co-operative society		Website

=== Transport ===
Sl. No	Company	Incorporated	Headquarters	Parent department	Role	Type	Remarks	Website
1	State Express Transport Corporation (Tamil Nadu) Limited	1996	Chennai	Transport	Public Bus Transport Services	State Govt. Undertaking	Inter-state operations	www.tnstc.in
2	Metropolitan Transport Corporation (Chennai) Limited	1946	Chennai	Transport	Public Bus Transport Services	State Govt. Undertaking	Chennai city and suburban operation	www.mtcbus.org
3	Pallavan Transport Consultancy Services Limited	20 February 1984	Chennai	Transport	Consultancy for Transport projects	State Nodal Agency		Website
4	Tamil Nadu Maritime Board	1997	Chennai	Highways and Minor Ports	Ports Development	State Govt. Undertaking		www.tnmaritime.com
5	Poompuhar Shipping Corporation Limited	1974	Chennai	Highways and Minor Ports	Shipping	State Govt. Undertaking		www.tamilship.com
6	Tamil Nadu State Transport Corporation (Kumbakonam) Limited	1972	Divisional Headquarters at Vellore, Villuppuram, Salem, Coimbatore, Kumbakonam, Srirangam, Madurai, Tirunelveli	Transport	Public Bus Transport Services	State Govt. Undertaking	Segmented into seven independent divisions	www.tnstc.in
7	Tamil Nadu State Transport Corporation (Villupuram) Limited	1972	Divisional Headquarters at Vellore, Villuppuram, Salem, Coimbatore, Kumbakonam, Srirangam, Madurai, Tirunelveli	Transport	Public Bus Transport Services	State Govt. Undertaking	Segmented into seven independent divisions	www.tnstc.in
8	Tamil Nadu State Transport Corporation (Salem) Limited	1972	Divisional Headquarters at Vellore, Villuppuram, Salem, Coimbatore, Kumbakonam, Srirangam, Madurai, Tirunelveli	Transport	Public Bus Transport Services	State Govt. Undertaking	Segmented into seven independent divisions	www.tnstc.in
9	Tamil Nadu State Transport Corporation (Madurai) Limited	1972	Divisional Headquarters at Vellore, Villuppuram, Salem, Coimbatore, Kumbakonam, Srirangam, Madurai, Tirunelveli	Transport	Public Bus Transport Services	State Govt. Undertaking	Segmented into seven independent divisions	www.tnstc.in
10	Tamil Nadu State Transport Corporation (Thirunelveli) Limited	1972	Divisional Headquarters at Vellore, Villuppuram, Salem, Coimbatore, Kumbakonam, Srirangam, Madurai, Tirunelveli	Transport	Public Bus Transport Services	State Govt. Undertaking	Segmented into seven independent divisions	www.tnstc.in
11	Tamil Nadu State Transport Corporation (Coimbatore) Limited	1972	Divisional Headquarters at Vellore, Villuppuram, Salem, Coimbatore, Kumbakonam, Srirangam, Madurai, Tirunelveli	Transport	Public Bus Transport Services	State Govt. Undertaking	Segmented into seven independent divisions	www.tnstc.in
12	Tamil Nadu State Transport Corporation Limited	1972	Divisional Headquarters at Vellore, Villuppuram, Salem, Coimbatore, Kumbakonam, Srirangam, Madurai, Tirunelveli	Transport	Public Bus Transport Services	State Govt. Undertaking	Segmented into seven independent divisions	www.tnstc.in
13	Chennai Metro Rail Limited	29 June 2015	Chennai	Transport	Metro Rail services	Undertaken by State Govt. and central Govt.	A joint P.S.U. Between government of Tamil Nadu and government of India. Operates currently in chennai as chennai metro, plans to operate in coimbatore as coimbatore metro	www.chennaimetrorail.org

=== Others ===
Sl. No	Company	Incorporated	Headquarters	Parent department	Role	Type	Remarks	Website
1	Tamil Nadu Pollution Control Board (TNPCB)	1982	Chennai	Environment and Forests	Prevention and Abatement of pollution	Statutory Corporation		www.tnpcb.gov.in
2	Tamil Nadu State Marketing Corporation Limited	1983	Chennai	Home, Prohibition and Excise	Liquor Procurement & Marketing	State Govt. Undertaking	Sole marketer of Liquors in the state	www.tasmac.tn.gov.in
3	Tamil Nadu Tourism Development Corporation	1971	Chennai	Tourism and Culture	Tourism Promotion	State Govt. Undertaking		www.ttdconline.com
4	Tamil Nadu Arasu Cable TV Corporation Limited	2007	Chennai	Information Technology	Cable TV service provision	State Govt. Undertaking		Website
5	Tamil Arasu Publications		Chennai	Information	Government News Reel	State Govt. Undertaking		Website
6	Tamil Nadu e-Governance Agency	2007	Chennai	Information	e – Government	State Govt Nodal Agency		www.tnega.in
7	Tamil Nadu Textbook Corporation Limited	1970	Chennai	Department of School Education (Tamil Nadu)	Education	State Govt. Undertaking		www.textbookcorp.tn.nic.in
8	Tamil Nadu Planning Commission		Chennai	Department of Finance (Tamil Nadu)				http://www.tn.gov.in/spc/

== Defunct organisations ==
Sl. No	Agency Name	Incorporated	Headquarters	Parent department	Role	Type	Closing / Re – Organisation	Present Status	News
1	Tamil Nadu Dairy Development Corporation Limited	July 1972	Chennai	Dairy		State Govt. Undertaking	February 1981	re-organised as Tamil Nadu Co-Operative Milk Producers Federation Limited	http://www.indiankanoon.org/doc/1872494/
2	Tamil Nadu Agro-Industries Development Corporation Limited	1966	Chennai	Industries		26 March 2002		http://www.indiankanoon.org/docfragment/1751585/?formInput=tamil%20nadu%20agro	
3	Tamil Nadu State Farms Corporation Limited								
4	Tamil Nadu Ceramics Limited	15 July 1974	Chennai	Industries	Manufacture of Ceramic Products (including Sanitary ware) in Ranipettai Industrial Estate	State Govt. Undertaking		Closed & Merged with Tamil Nadu Industries Department, Government of Tamil Nadu	https://web.archive.org/web/20131207190850/http://tacel.in/home
5	Tamil Nadu Sugarcane Farm Corporation Limited	1974	Chennai			State Govt. Undertaking		Merged with Sugar Department, Government of Tamil Nadu	
6	Tamil Nadu Goods Transport Corporation Limited	1975	Chennai			State Govt. Undertaking		Merged with Tamil Nadu State Transport Corporation as Goods Transport Division	
7	Dharmapuri District Development Corporation Limited	1975						re-organised & presently functioning as Dharmapuri District Socio Economic Development Society (DDSEDS)	
8	State Engineering and Servicing Corporation of Tamil Nadu Limited							Merged with Tamil Nadu Agricultural Engineering Department as Engineering Services Division	
9	Tamil Nadu State Tube Wells Corporation Limited	1982				State Govt. Undertaking			
10	Tamil Nadu State Sports Development Corporation Limited	1984				State Govt. Undertaking		presently functioning as Sports Development Authority of Tamil Nadu by merging with other entities	
11	Chit Corporation of Tamil Nadu Limited	1984					2002	Merged with Tamil Nadu Revenue Department	
12	Tamil Nadu Spirit Corporation Limited		Chennai	Industries			2002	Amalgamated with TASMAC	
13	Tamil Nadu Graphite Limited							Tamil Nadu Minerals Limited (TAMIN)	
14	Cheran Engineering Corporation Limited	1974	Chennai	Industries		State Govt. Undertaking		Closed	
15	Tamil Nadu Theater Corporation Limited	1972	Chennai			State Govt. Undertaking		Merged with respective Local bodies	
16	Tamil Nadu Meat Corporation Limited	1981				State Govt. Undertaking			
17	Tamil Nadu Leather Development Corporation Limited	1983						presently functioning Leather Division Tamil Nadu Khadi and Village Industries Board, taken over merging by the Tamil Nadu Khadi and Village Industries Board	
18	Tamil Nadu Corporation of Industrial Infrastructure Development Limited (TACID)	March 1992					1 November 1999	merged with State Industries Promotion Corporation of Tamil Nadu	* (); * 2 (); 3 ()
19	Tamil Nadu Board of Revenue	1790					1980	re-organised or merged as sub – departments of Tamil Nadu Revenue Department	
20	Tamil Nadu Steels Limited (TANSTEEL)						2000	closed	
21	Tamil Nadu Poultry Development Corporation Limited (TAPCO)	March 1992					1 November 1999	merged with State Industries Promotion Corporation of Tamil Nadu	* (); * 2 (); 3 ()
22	Tamil Nadu Magnesium and Marine Chemicals Limited					State Govt. Undertaking			
23	Industrial and Technical Consultancy Organisation of Tamil Nadu (ITCOT)		Chennai			Statutory corporation		ITCOT Consultancy and Services Limited	Website – www.itcot.com; Government of Tamil Nadu formed Industrial and Technical Consultancy Organisation of Tamil Nadu (ITCOT) as Statutory Board; Government of Tamil Nadu then established ITCOT as separate company called Industrial and Technical Consultancy Organisation of Tamil Nadu Limited (ITCOT) under the Companies Act, 1956; Government of Tamil Nadu then divested its shares in Industrial and Technical Consultancy Organisation of Tamil Nadu Limited (ITCOT) to State Industries Promotion Corporation of Tamil Nadu|State Industries Promotion Corporation of Tamil Nadu (SIPCOT), Tamil Nadu Small Industries Development Corporation Limited|Tamil Nadu Small Industries Development Corporation Limited (TANSIDCO), Tamil Nadu Industrial Investment Corporation Limited|Tamil Nadu Industrial Investment Corporation Limited (TIIC)
24	Tamil Nadu Public Works Engineering Corporation Limited		Chennai						
25	Tamil Nadu Agro Engineering and Service Co-operative Federation Limited (AGROFED)		Chennai				30 November 2004		
26	Tamil Nadu Coconut Farmers' Welfare Board		Chennai						
27	Tamil Nadu Co operative Oil Seeds Growers Federation Limited (TANCOF)		Chennai						

== See also ==
- Government of Tamil Nadu
- Tamil Nadu Government's Departments
- Government of India
- List of Indian agencies
- List of public sector undertakings in India
- List of government-owned companies
- Public sector undertakings in Kerala
- List of Kerala State Government Organizations
- List of agencies of the government of Gujarat
- Tamil Nadu Government Laws & Rules
