= List of government of Tamil Nadu laws and rules =

Indian state legislation

Government of Tamil Nadu
- Seat of Government: Chennai

Legislative branch
- Assembly: Tamil Nadu Legislative Assembly
- Speaker: Vacant
- Council: None
- Chairman: None
- Deputy Chair: none

Executive branch
- Governor: Rajendra Vishwanath Arlekar
- Chief Minister: C. Joseph Vijay
- Chief Secretary: Dr. M. Sai Kumar, IAS

Judiciary
- High Court: Madras High Court
- Chief Justice: Sushrut Arvind Dharmadhikari

This is a list of laws and rules of the government of Tamil Nadu.

== Tamil Nadu Government Laws and Rules ==
Tamil Nadu Government Laws and Rules include as follows:

- Act
- Manual
- Regulations

The Tamil Nadu Government Laws and Rules are of two types as follows:

- Internal – for Tamil Nadu Government internal purposes
- Public

=== Internal ===
==== Tamil Nadu Government – General Manuals ====
- The Tamil Nadu Secretariat Office Manual
- The Tamil Nadu Services Manuals 1970

- The Tamil Nadu Services Manuals I
- The Tamil Nadu Services Manuals II
- The Tamil Nadu Services Manuals III
- The Tamil Nadu Services Manuals IV

- The Fundamental Rules of the Tamil Nadu Government
- The Tamil Nadu Government Business Rules and Secretariat Instructions, 1978
- The Tamil Nadu Secretariat Service Rules, 1933
- The Tamil Nadu General Service Rules
- The Tamil Nadu Basic Service Rules
- The Tamil Nadu Leave Rules, 1933
- The Tamil Nadu Pension Rules, 1978
- The Tamil Nadu Government Servants Conduct Rules, 1973
- The Tamil Nadu Civil Services (Discipline and Appeal) Rules
- The Tamil Nadu State and Subordinate Services Rules, 1987
- The Tamil Nadu General Subordinate Service Rules

==== Tamil Nadu Government – Departmental Wise Rules ====
- PWD: Tamil Nadu Architect Service Rules
- PWD: Rules for Tamil Nadu Boiler Service
- Stationery and Printing Department: Services Rules
- Public and Rehabilitation Department: Service Rules
- Public (Buildings) Department – Special Rules Amendment – 2011
- Directorate of Social Welfare – Service Rules
- Secretariat – Welfare of the Differently Abled Persons Department – Service Rules
- Secretariat – Agriculture Department – Service Rules
- Tamil Nadu State Judicial Service (Cadre and Recruitment) Rules, 2007
- Ad hoc Rules, Special Rules – Prohibition and Excise Department
- Youth Welfare and Sports Development Department – Service Rules – Sports Development Authority of Tamil Nadu
- Ad hoc Rules, Special Rules – Inspectorate of Factories
- Registration of Births and Deaths Act 1969 (Act No. 18 of 1969)
- Tamil Nadu Registration of Births and Deaths Rules, 2000
- G.O. Ms. No. 528 Health and Family Welfare Dated 29 December 1999
- Ad hoc Rules and Special Rules – Information and Public Relations Department
- Service Rules – BC, MBC and Minorities Welfare Department
- Implementation of Scheduled Tribes and Other Traditional Forest Dwellers (Recognition of Forest) Act, 2006 [English] [Tamil]
- Tamil Nadu Molasses Control and Regulation Rules, 1958 – Prohibition and Excise Dept
- TN Liquor (License and Permit) Rules, 1981 – Prohibition and Excise Dept
- The Tamil Nadu Spirituous Preparations (Control) Rules, 1984 – Prohibition and Excise Dept
- The Tamil Nadu Narcotic Drugs Rules, 1985 – Prohibition and Excise Dept
- The Tamil Nadu Liquor Retail Vending (In Shops and Bars) Rules, 2003 – Prohibition & Excise Dept
- Tamil Nadu Distillery Rules, 1981 – Prohibition and Excise Dept
- The Tamil Nadu Disposal of Articles (Confiscated under the Tamil Nadu Prohibition Act) Rules, 1979 – Prohibition & Excise Dept
- Denatured Spirit – FP Rules, 1959 (Updated) – Prohibition and Excise Dept
- Tamil Nadu Indian-Made Foreign Spirits (Manufacture) Rules, 1981
- The Medicinal and Toilet Preparations (Excise Duties) Rules, 1956
- Tamil Nadu Rectified Spirit Rules, 1959
- The Tamil Nadu Liquor (Transit) Rules, 1982
- Tamil Nadu Mass Wine Rules, 1984
- Tamil Nadu Spirituous Essences Rules,1972
- Tamil Nadu Wine (Manufacture) Rules, 2006
- The Tamil Nadu Brewery Rules, 1983
- The Tamil Nadu Liquor (Supply by Wholesale) Rules, 1983
- Service Rules – Animal Husbandry, Dairying and Fisheries Department – Dairy Wing
- Service Rules – Animal Husbandry, Dairying and Fisheries Department
- Service Rules – Directorate of Adi Dravidar Welfare
- Service Rules – Commissionerate of Tourism
- Service Rules – Commissionerate of Art and Culture
- Service Rules – Commissionerate of Archaeology
- Ad hoc Rules – Basic Service
- Service Rules – Ad hoc Rules (all posts) – Directorate of Tamil Etymological Dictionary Project
- Service Rules – Ad hoc Rules (all posts) – Directorate of Tamil Development
- Tamil Nadu General Services – Ad hoc Rules (Finance) – JS and ADS
- Service Rules – Industries and Commerce
- Service Rules – Tamil Nadu Industries Services
- Ad hoc Rules – Government Museums
- Special Rules – Electrical Inspectorate (Energy Department)
- Special Rules – Government Museums
- Department of Law – Service Rules
- Tamil Nadu Government Gazette: Ordinance No. 2 of 2008 on observing Thai 1 as New Year's Day
- Department of Tourism and Culture – Service Rules
- Department of Town and Country Planning – Service Rules
- Department of Transport (Motor Vehicles Maintenance Dept) – Service Rules
- Department of Employment and Training – Service Rules
- Central Motor Vehicles (Amendment) Rules, 2007
- An Ordinance to make special provisions for Chennai Metropolitan Planning Area for a period of one year and for matters connected therewith or incidental thereto
- Tamil Nadu Government Gazette: Ordinance No. 4 of 2007 on Reservations for Backward Class Muslims and Backward Class Christians
- The General Provident Fund Rules
- TN Building and other Construction Workers (Regulation of Employment and Conditions of Service) Rules, 2006
- TN Acts and Ordinances:
- No. 10 – Forcible Conversion of Religion (Repeal) Act, 2006,
- No.11 – Essential Services Maintenance (Repeal) Act, 2006
- No.12 – Backward Classes, Scheduled Castes and Scheduled Tribes (Reservation of Seats in Private Educational Institutions) Act, 2006
- No. 13 – Learning of Tamil as one of the subjects in all schools in the state of Tamil Nadu
- Tamil Nadu Travelling Allowance Rules, 2005 and Annexure
- Tamil Nadu Fiscal Responsibility Act, 2003 with Amendment
- Prohibition of Charging Exorbitant Interest Act No. 38 of 2003
- Tax on Consumption or Sale of Electricity Act, 2003
- Draft TN Value Added Tax Bill, 2003
- Emigration (Amendment) Rules, 2002
- Employment Exchange Act
- Groundwater Acts
- P & A R Service Rules
- Planning, Development and Special Initiatives Department Service Rules
- Higher Education Department Service Rules
- Youth Welfare and Sports Development Department – Service Rules – Extract of Rules relating to NCC Department
- Right to Information Act
- Tender Rules
- Geology and Mining Rules
- Ordinance No. 2 of 2003 of Law Department
- Ordinance No. 2 of 2004 of Law Department
- Cancellation Notification under Tamil Nadu District Municipalities Act and Constitution of certain Town Panchayats as Village Panchayats under Tamil Nadu Panchayats Act
- Tamil Nadu District Municipalities (Amendment) Ordinance, 2004
- Central Acts & Ordinances – Ordinances No. 1 and 2 of 2004
- Tamil Nadu Acts and Ordinances – Ordinances No. 9, 10, 11, 12 and 13 of 2004
- Environment and Forest Department – Service Rules
- Handlooms and Textiles – Subordinate Services Rules
- Ministerial Service Rules / Ad hoc Rules – Revenue Department
- Finance Department – Service Rules

===== General Rules =====
- No. 13 – Learning of Tamil as one of the subjects in all schools in the state of Tamil Nadu
- Tamil Nadu Travelling Allowance Rules – 2005 and Annexure

===== Service Rules =====
- No. 13 – Learning of Tamil as one of the subjects in all schools in the state of Tamil Nadu
- Tamil Nadu Travelling Allowance Rules – 2017 and Annexure

===== Ad hoc Rules =====
- No. 13 – Learning of Tamil as one of the subjects in all schools in the state of Tamil Nadu
- Tamil Nadu Travelling Allowance Rules – 2005 and Annexure

===== Ordinance and Others =====
- No. 13 – Learning of Tamil as one of the important subjects in all schools in the state of Tamil Nadu
- Tamil Nadu Travelling Allowance Rules – 2005 and Annexure

===== Home, Prohibition and Excise =====
- Police

- Tamil Nadu Police Subordinate Service Rules
- Tamil Nadu Police Subordinate Service (D&A) Rules
- Tamil Nadu Special Police Subordinate Service Rules

- Prohibition and Excise

- Tamil Nadu Rectified Spirit Rules, 2000
- Tamil Nadu Distillery Rules, 1981
- Tamil Nadu I.M.F.S (Manufacture) Rules, 1981
- Tamil Nadu Brewery Rules, 1983
- Tamil Nadu Mass Wine Rules, 1984
- Tamil Nadu Liquor (Licence and Permit) Rules, 1981
- Tamil Nadu Liquor (Supply by Wholesale) Rules, 1983
- Tamil Nadu Liquor (Retail Vending in Shops and Bars) Rules, 2003
- Tamil Nadu Liquor (Transit) Rules, 1982
- Tamil Nadu Spirituous Essences Rules, 1972
- Tamil Nadu Spirituous Preparation (Control) Rules, 1984
- Tamil Nadu Wine (Manufacture) Rules, 2006
- Tamil Nadu Denatured Spirit, Methyl Alcohol and Varnish (French Polish) Rules, 1959
- Tamil Nadu Molasses Control and Regulation Rules, 1958
- Tamil Nadu Narcotic Drug Rules, 1985
- Tamil Nadu Medicinal and Toilet Preparations (Excise Duties) Rules, 1956
- Tamil Nadu Disposal of Articles (Confiscated under Tamil Nadu Prohibition Act) Rules, 1979

- Rules for Tamil Nadu Boiler Service

===== Tamil Development and Information =====
- Tamil Nadu Government Press Subordinate Service Special Rules
- Tamil Nadu Stationery and Printing Service Special Rules

===== Public =====
- Tamil Nadu Government Press Subordinate Service Special Rules
- Tamil Nadu Stationery and Printing Subordinate Service Rules
- Tamil Nadu Stationery and Printing Service Special Rules

===== Agriculture =====
- Special Rules for Agricultural Extension Subordinate Service
- Tamil Nadu Agricultural Subordinate Service
- Tamil Nadu Agriculture Service
- Tamil Nadu Agricultural Marketing Service
- Tamil Nadu Agricultural Marketing Subordinate Service Rules
- Special Rules for Tamil Nadu Agricultural Marketing Subordinate Service
- Special Rules for Tamil Nadu Agricultural Marketing Service
- Tamil Nadu Agricultural University

===== Youth Welfare and Sports Development =====
- Sports Development Authority of Tamil Nadu Service Rules, 1998

===== Tamil Nadu Government Codes =====
- The Tamil Nadu Financial Code
- The Tamil Nadu Treasury Code
- The Tamil Nadu Account Code

- The Tamil Nadu Forest Department Account Code
- The Tamil Nadu Public Works Account Code

=== Public ===
There are several laws under 40 Secretariat Departments as follows:

- Department of Adi Dravidar and Tribal Welfare (Tamil Nadu)
- Department of Agriculture (Tamil Nadu)
- Department of Animal Husbandry, Dairying and Fisheries (Tamil Nadu)
- Department of Backward Classes, Most Backward Classes and Minorities Welfare (Tamil Nadu)
- Department of Co-operation, Food and Consumer Protection (Tamil Nadu)
- Department of Commercial Taxes and Registration (Tamil Nadu)
- Department of Energy (Tamil Nadu)
- Department of Environment and Forests (Tamil Nadu)
- Department of Finance (Tamil Nadu)
- Department of Handlooms, Handicrafts, Textiles and Khadi (Tamil Nadu)
- Department of Health and Family Welfare (Tamil Nadu)
- Department of Higher Education (Tamil Nadu)
- Department of Highways and Minor Ports (Tamil Nadu)
- Department of Home, Prohibition and Excise (Tamil Nadu)
- Department of Industries (Tamil Nadu)
- Department of Information Technology (Tamil Nadu)
- Department of Labour and Employment (Tamil Nadu)
- Department of Law (Tamil Nadu)
- Department of Legislative Assembly (Tamil Nadu)
- Department of Municipal Administration and Water Supply (Tamil Nadu)
- Department of Micro, Small and Medium Enterprises (Tamil Nadu) (formerly Small Industries Department)
- Department of Personnel and Administrative Reforms (Tamil Nadu)
- Department of Planning, Development and Special Initiatives (Tamil Nadu)
- Department of Public (Tamil Nadu)
- Department of Public Works (Tamil Nadu)
- Department of Revenue (Tamil Nadu)
- Department of Rural Development and Panchayat (Tamil Nadu)
- Department of School Education (Tamil Nadu)
- Department of Social Reforms (Tamil Nadu)
- Department of Social Welfare and Nutritious Meal Programme (Tamil Nadu)
- Department of Special Programme Implementation (Tamil Nadu)
- Department of Tourism and Culture (Tamil Nadu)
- Department of Tamil Development, Religious Endowments and Information (Tamil Nadu)
- Department of Transport (Tamil Nadu)
- Department of Youth Welfare and Sports (Tamil Nadu)
- Department of Welfare of Differently Abled Persons (Tamil Nadu)

==== Education ====
===== Universities Acts =====
No.	University Name	Act Name	Act No	Year	Tamil Nadu Government Related Web Links	Other Web Links
1	Alagappa University	The Alagappa University Act, 1985	23 of 1985	1985		
2	Anna University	The Anna University Act, 1978	30 of 1978	1978		
3	Annamalai University	The Annamalai University Act, 1928	1 of 1929	1929		
4	Bharathiar University	The Bharathiar University Act, 1981	1 of 1982	1982		
5	Bharathidasan University	The Bharathidasan University Act, 1981	2 of 1982	1982		
6	Madurai Kamaraj University	The Madurai-Kamaraj University Act, 1965	33 of 1965	1965		
7	Manonmaniam Sundaranar University	The Manonmaniam Sundaranar University Act, 1990	31 of 1990	1990		
8	Mother Teresa Women's University	The Mother Teresa Women's University Act, 1984	15 of 1984	1984		
9	Periyar University	The Periyar University Act, 1997	45 of 1997	1997		
10	Tamil Nadu Dr. Ambedkar Law University	The Tamil Nadu Dr. Ambedkar Law University Act, 1996	43 of 1997	1997		
11	Tamil Nadu Agricultural University	The Tamil Nadu Agricultural University Act, 1971	8 of 1971	1971		
12	The Tamil Nadu Dr. M. G. R. Medical University	The Tamil Nadu Dr. M.G.R. Medical University Act, 1987	37 of. 1987	1987		
13	The Tamil Nadu National Law School	The Tamil Nadu National Law School Act, 2012	9 of 2012	2012		||
14	Tamil Nadu Veterinary and Animal Sciences University	The Tamil Nadu Veterinary and Animal Sciences University Act, 1989	42 of 1989	1989		
15	Tamil University	The Tamil University Act, 1982	9 of 1982	1982		
16	Thiruvalluvar University	Thiruvalluvar University Act, 2002	32 of 2002	2002		
17	University of Madras	Chennai	Chennai	State	Humanities, Sciences	1857
18	Tamil Nadu Teachers Education University	Chennai	Chennai	State	Education	2008
19	Tamil Nadu Open University	Chennai	Chennai	State		2004
20	Tamil Nadu Physical Education and Sports University	Chennai	Chennai	State	Sports	2005
21	Tamil Nadu Fisheries University	Nagapattinam	Nagapattinam	State	Fisheries & Aqua Culture	Proposed (as per Tamil Nadu Fisheries University Act, 2012)

===== Others =====
- The Indian Medical Degrees (Tamil Nadu Amendment) Act, 1940
- The Tamil Nadu Drugs and Other Stores (Unlawful Possession) Act, 1986
- The Tamil Nadu Educational Development Day (Declaration and Celebration) Act, 2006
- The Tamil Nadu Educational Institutions (Prohibition of Collection of Capitation Fee) Act, 1992
- The Tamil Nadu Educational Institutions (Temporary Control of Property) Act, 1949
- The Tamil Nadu Elementary Education Act, 1920
- The Tamil Nadu Private Colleges (Regulation) Act, 1976
- The Tamil Nadu Private Educational Institutions (Regulation) Act, 1966
- Tamil Nadu State Council for Higher Education Act 1992

==== Department ====
===== Education =====
- The Indian Medical Degrees (Tamil Nadu Amendment) Act, 1940
- The Tamil Nadu Drugs and Other Stores (Unlawful Possession) Act, 1986
- The Tamil Nadu Educational Development Day (Declaration and Celebration) Act, 2006

===== Municipal Administration and Water Supply =====
- The Bhavanisagar Township Act, 1954
- The Courtallam Township Act, 1954
- The Courtallam Township (Validation of Taxes and Library Cess) Act, 1960
- The Chennai City Municipal Corporation Act, 1919
- The Coimbatore City Municipal Corporation Act, 1981
- The Coimbatore Municipal Council (Appointment of Special Officers) Act, 1975
- The Erode City Municipal Corporation Act, 2008

==== Tamil Nadu Government Acts by Year ====
===== 1983 =====
Sl. No	Act Name	Act No	Detail	Tamil Nadu Government Web Links	Other Web Links
1	The Tamil Nadu Sales Tax (Settlement of Arrears) Act, 2008	60 of 2008	Finance		
2	The Tamil Nadu Laws (Special Provisions) Act, 2008	56 of 2008	Housing and Urban Development		
3	The Chennai City Police (Extension to the Chennai City Suburban Area) Act, 2008	54 of 2008	Police		
4	The Tamil Nadu Laws (Special Provisions) Act, 2008	56 of 2008	Housing and Urban Development		
5	The Tamil Nadu Sales Tax (Settlement of Arrears) Act, 2008	60 of 2008	Finance		
6	The Tamil Nadu Laws (Special Provisions) Act, 2008	56 of 2008	Housing and Urban Development		
7	The Tamil Nadu Sales Tax (Settlement of Arrears) Act, 2008	60 of 2008	Finance		
8	The Tamil Nadu Laws (Special Provisions) Act, 2008	56 of 2008	Housing and Urban Development		
9	The Tamil Nadu Sales Tax (Settlement of Arrears) Act, 2008	60 of 2008	Finance		
10	The Tamil Nadu Laws (Special Provisions) Act, 2008	56 of 2008	Housing and Urban Development		
11	The Tamil Nadu Sales Tax (Settlement of Arrears) Act, 2008	60 of 2008	Finance		

=== General ===
==== 1 ====
- Tamil Nadu General Sales Tax Act, 1959
- Tamil Nadu General Sales Tax (Emergency Provisions) Act, 1958
- Tamil Nadu General Sales Tax (Special Provisions And Validation) Act, 1998
- Tamil Nadu General Sales Tax (Special Provisions) Act, 1964
- Tamil Nadu General Sales Tax (Turnover and Assessment) Rules Validation Act, 1959
- Tamil Nadu General Sales Tax (Validation) Act, 1987

==== 2 ====
- Tamil Nadu Palm Products Development Board Act, 1994

==== Education ====
- Tamil Nadu Agricultural University Act, 1971
- The Alagappa University Act, 1985
- The Anna University Act, 1978
- The Anna University Coimbatore Act, 2006
- The Anna University, Tiruchirappalli Act, 2006
- The Anna University, Tirunelveli Act, 2007
- The Annamalai University Act, 1928
- The Bharathiar University Act, 1981
- The Bharathidasan University Act, 1981

==== Local Bodies Act ====
- The Bhavanisagar Township Act, 1954
- The Courtallam Township Act, 1954
- The Courtallam Township (Validation of Taxes and Library Cess) Act, 1960
- Chennai City Municipal Corporation Act, 1919
- The Coimbatore City Municipal Corporation Act, 1981
- The Coimbatore Municipal Council (Appointment of Special Officers) Act, 1975
- The Erode City Municipal Corporation Act, 2008

==== 2 o ====
- Tamil Nadu Protection of Tanks and Eviction of Encroachment Act, 2007
- Tamil Nadu Land Encroachment Act, 1905
- Tamil Nadu Public Buildings (Licensing) Act, 1965
- Tamil Nadu Nuclear Installations (Regulation of Buildings and Use of Land) Act, 1978
- Tamil Nadu Warehouses Act, 1951
- Tamil Nadu Protection of Interests of Depositors (In Financial Establishments) Act, 1997
- Tamil Nadu Shops and Establishments Act, 1947
- Tamil Nadu Urban Land (Ceiling and Regulations) Act, 1978
- Tamil Nadu Buildings (Lease and Rent Control) Act, 1960
- Tamil Nadu Cultivating Tenants (Protection) Act, 1955
- Madras City Tenants Protection Act, 1921
- Madras City Tenants Protection (Amendment) Act, 1994
- Chennai City Police (Extension to the Chennai City Suburban Area) Act, 2008
- Chennai City Police (Extension to the Cities of Salem, Tiruchirappalli and Tirunelveli) Act, 1997
- Chennai Metropolitan Area Groundwater (Regulation) Act, 1987
- City of Madras Alteration of Name Act, 1991
- City of Madras (Alteration of Name) Act, 1996
- Chennai City Police Extension to the City of Madurai and Coimbatore Act
- Chennai Metropolitan Water Supply and Sewerage Act, 1978
- Jaina Succession Act, 1928
- Mappilla Succession Act, 1918
- Tamil Nadu Fire Service Act, 1985
- Indian Bar Council (Tamil Nadu Amendment) Act, 1954
- The Agriculturists' Loans (Tamil Nadu Amendment) Act, 1935
- The Bar Councils and Legal Practitioners (Tamil Nadu Amendment) Act, 1947
- The Bhavani Reservoir Irrigation Cess Act, 1933
- The Cattle-Trespass (Tamil Nadu Amendment) Act, 1957
- The Code of Civil Procedure (Tamil Nadu Amendment) Act, 1950
- The Cotton Ginning and Pressing Factories (Tamil Nadu Amendment) Act, 1948
- The Cotton Transport (Tamil Nadu Amendment) Act, 1948
- The East and West Tanjore Sessions Divisions (Validation) Act, 1931
- The Evacuee Interest (Separation) Tamil Nadu Supplementary Act, 1961
- The Factories (Tamil Nadu Amendment) Act, 2007
- The Glanders and Farcy (Tamil Nadu Amendment) Act, 1965
- The Gudalur Compensation for Tenants Improvements Act, 1931
- The Gudalur Janmam Estates (Abolition and Conversion into Ryotwari) Act, 1969
- The Hindu Marriage (Tamil Nadu) (Amendment) Act, 1967
- The Holdings (Stay of Execution Proceedings) (Tamil Nadu Amendment) Act, 1957
- The Identification of Prisoners (Tamil Nadu Amendment) Act, 1981
- The Indian Christian Marriage (Extension to Transferred Territory) Act, 1995
- The Indian Criminal Law Amendment (Tamil Nadu) Act, 1950
- The Indian Electricity (Tamil Nadu Amendment) Act, 1980
- The Indian Fisheries (Tamil Nadu Amendment) Act, 1927
- The Indian Lunacy (Tamil Nadu Amendment) Act, 1938
- The Indian Medical Degrees (Tamil Nadu Amendment) Act, 1940
- The Indian Partnership (Tamil Nadu Amendment) Act, 1959
- The Indian Penal Code and the Code of Criminal Procedure (Tamil Nadu Amendment) Act, 1960
- The Indian Registration (Tamil Nadu Amendment) Act, 1974
- The Indian Stamp (Tamil Nadu Amendment) Act, 1958
- The Indian Tolls (Tamil Nadu Amendment) Act, 1942
- The Indian Treasure-Trove (Tamil Nadu Amendment) Act, 1949
- The Industrial Disputes Tamil Nadu (Amendment) Act, 1963
- The Industrial Employment (Standing Orders) Tamil Nadu (Amendment) Act, 1960
- The Kanyakumari Sree-Padam Lands (Abolition and Conversion into Ryotwari) Act, 1972
- The Kanyakumari Sreepandaravaka Lands (Abolition and Conversion into Ryotwari) Act, 1964
- The Kelavarapalli Reservoir Scheme (Acquisition of Land) Act, 1987
- The Koodalmanickam Devaswom Act, 1918
- The Land Acquisition (Tamil Nadu Amendment) Act, 1948
- The Land Improvement Loans (Tamil Nadu Amendment) Act, 1964
- The Legal Practitioners (Tamil Nadu Amendment) Act, 1943
- The Legal Practitioners (Tamil Nadu Amendment) Act, 1960
- The Lepers (Tamil Nadu Repeal) Act, 1987
- The Letters Patent Providing for Sheriff Appointment (Tamil Nadu Amendment) Act, 1983
- The Madras City Civil Court Act, 1892
- The Madras City Land-Revenue Act, 1851
- The Madras City Municipal Corporation Act, 1919
- The Madras City Police (Extension to the City of Madurai and to the City of Coimbatore) Act, 1987
- The Madras City Police Act, 1888
- The Madras Court of Small Causes (Validation of Proceedings) Act, 1943
- The Madras High Court (Jurisdictional Limits) Act, 1927
- The Madras High Court (Jurisdictional Limits) Extension Act, 1985
- The Madras Metropolitan Water Supply and Sewerage Act, 1978
- The Madras Race Club (Acquisition and Transfer of Undertaking) Act, 1986
- The Madras Survey and Boundaries Act, 1923
- The Madras University Act, 1923
- The Madurai City Municipal Corporation Act, 1971
- The Madurai-Kamaraj University Act, 1965
- The Malabar Compensation for Tenants Improvements Act, 1899
- The Malabar Land Registration Act, 1895
- The Malabar Tenancy Act, 1929
- The Malabar Wills Act, 1898
- The Mappilla Maru-Makkattayam Act, 1939
- The Mappilla Wills Act, 1928
- The Mettur Canal Irrigation Cess Act, 1953
- The Mettur Township Act, 1940
- The Minimum Wages (Tamil Nadu Amendment) Act, 1981
- The Mother Teressa Women's University (Amendment) Act, 2002
- The Motor Transport Workers (Tamil Nadu Amendment) Act, 1975
- The Motor Vehicles (Tamil Nadu Amendment) Act, 1948
- The Muslim Personal Law (Shariat) Application (Tamil Nadu Amendment) Act, 1949
- The Nilgiris Game and Fish Preservation Act, 1879
- The Opium and Dangerous Drugs (Tamil Nadu Amendment) Act, 1947
- The Pachaiyappa's Trust (Taking Over of Management) Act, 1981
- The Parambikulam-Aliyar Project (Regulation of Water-Supply) Act, 1993
- The Payment of Wages (Tamil Nadu Amendment) Act, 1959
- The Periyar Irrigation Tanks (Preservation) Act, 1934
- The Periyar University Act, 1997
- The Plantations Labour (Tamil Nadu Amendment) Act, 1996
- The Police (Tamil Nadu Amendment) Act, 1948
- The Presidency Small Cause Courts (Tamil Nadu Amendment) Act, 1927
- The Presidency Small Cause Courts, Code of Civil Procedure and Tamil Nadu Court-Fees and Suits Valuation (Amendment) Act, 1979
- The Presidency Towns Insolvency (Tamil Nadu Amendment) Act, 1943
- The Press and Registration of Books (Tamil Nadu Amendment) Act, 1960
- The Prevention of Insults to National Honour Act, 1957
- The Prince of Arcot Endowments Act, 1922
- The Prisoners Tamil Nadu (Amendment) Act, 1958
- The Prisons and Indian Lunacy (Tamil Nadu Amendment) Act, 1938
- The Provincial Insolvency (Tamil Nadu Amendment) Act, 1953
- The Provincial Small Cause Courts (Tamil Nadu Amendment) Act, 1949
- The Public Wakf's (Extension of Limitation) Tamil Nadu Amendment Act, 1981
- The Pudukkottai (Settlement of Inams) Act, 1955
- The Railway Protection Act, 1886
- The Rajapalayam Municipal Executive Authority (Functions Validation) Act, 1942
- The Salem City Municipal Corporation Act, 1994
- The Sevvalpatti Impartible Estate Act, 1930
- The State Co-Operative Societies (Re-Constitution And Formation) Act, 1954
- The Tamil Nadu (Added Territories) Extension of Laws (No.2) Act, 1961
- The Tamil Nadu (Added Territories) Extension of Laws Act, 1962
- The Tamil Nadu (Added Territories) Extension of Laws Act, 1964
- The Tamil Nadu (Added Territory) Extension of Laws Act, 1961
- The Tamil Nadu (Additional Assessment and Additional Water-Cess) Act, 1963
- The Tamil Nadu (Compulsory Censorship of Film Publicity Materials) Act, 1987
- The Tamil Nadu (Transferred Territory) Extension of Laws Act, 1957
- The Tamil Nadu (Transferred Territory) Extension of Laws Act, 1960
- The Tamil Nadu (Transferred Territory) Extension of Laws Act, 1965
- The Tamil Nadu (Transferred Territory) Extension of Laws Act, 1972
- The Tamil Nadu (Transferred Territory) Jenmikaram Payment Abolition Act, 1964
- The Tamil Nadu (Transferred Territory) Luxury Tax on Tobacco (Validation) Act, 1966
- The Tamil Nadu (Transferred Territory) Ryotwari Settlement Act, 1964
- The Tamil Nadu (Transferred Territory) Thiruppuvaram Payment Abolition Act, 1964
- The Tamil Nadu Abolition of Posts of Part-Time Village Officers Act, 1981
- The Tamil Nadu Acquisition of Hoardings Act, 1985
- The Tamil Nadu Acquisition of Land for Harijan Welfare Schemes Act, 1978
- The Tamil Nadu Acquisition of Land for Industrial Purpose Act, 1997
- The Tamil Nadu Additional Sales Tax Act, 1970
- The Tamil Nadu Admission in Professional Educational Institutions Act, 2006
- The Tamil Nadu Advocates Welfare Fund Act, 1987
- The Tamil Nadu Advocates' Clerks Welfare Fund Act, 1999
- The Tamil Nadu Agricultural Income-Tax Act, 1955
- The Tamil Nadu Agricultural Labourer Fair Wages Act, 1969
- The Tamil Nadu Agricultural Labourers-Farmers (Social Security and Welfare) Act, 2006
- The Tamil Nadu Agricultural Lands Record of Tenancy Rights Act, 1969
- The Tamil Nadu Agricultural Pests and Diseases Act, 1919
- The Tamil Nadu Agricultural Produce Marketing Regulation Act, 1987
- The Tamil Nadu Agricultural Produce Markets (Amendment and Special Provisions) Act, 1978
- The Tamil Nadu Agricultural Produce Markets Act, 1959
- The Tamil Nadu Agricultural Service Co-Operative Societies (Appointment of Special Officers) Act, 1986
- The Tamil Nadu Agriculture Income-Tax (Extension to Added Territory) Act, 1961
- The Tamil Nadu Agriculturists Relief Act, 1938
- The Tamil Nadu Aided Institutions (Prohibition of Transfers of Property) (Extension to Pudukkottai) Act, 1961
- The Tamil Nadu Aided Institutions (Prohibition of Transfers of Property) Act, 1948
- The Tamil Nadu Aliyasantana Act, 1949
- The Tamil Nadu Anatomy Act, 1951
- The Tamil Nadu Ancient and Historical Monuments and Archaeological Sites and Remains Act, 1966
- The Tamil Nadu Animal Preservation Act, 1958
- The Tamil Nadu Animals and Birds in Urban Areas (Control and Regulation) Act, 1997
- The Tamil Nadu Animals and Birds Sacrifices Prohibition Act, 1950
- The Tamil Nadu Apartment Ownership Act, 1994
- The Tamil Nadu Aquaculture (Regulation) Act, 1995
- The Tamil Nadu Backward Class Christians and Backward Class Muslims (Reservation of Seats in Educational Institutions Including Private Educational Institutions and of Appointments or Posts in the Services Under the State) Act, 2007
- The Tamil Nadu Backward Classes, Scheduled Castes and Scheduled Tribes (Reservation of Seats in Educational Institutions and of Appointments or Posts in the Services Under the State) Act, 1993
- The Tamil Nadu Backward Classes, Scheduled Castes and Scheduled Tribes (Reservation of Seats in Private Educational Institutions) Act, 2006
- The Tamil Nadu Betting Tax Act, 1935
- The Tamil Nadu Bhoodan Yagna Act, 1958
- The Tamil Nadu Board of Revenue Abolition Act, 1980
- The Tamil Nadu Board of Revenue Act, 1894
- The Tamil Nadu Borstal Schools Act, 1925
- The Tamil Nadu Building and Construction Workers (Conditions of Employment and Miscellaneous Provisions) Act, 1984
- The Tamil Nadu Buildings (Lease and Rent Control) Validation of Proceedings Act, 1971
- The Tamil Nadu Canals and Public Ferries Act, 1890
- The Tamil Nadu Catering Establishments Act, 1958
- The Tamil Nadu Cattle-Disease Act, 1866
- The Tamil Nadu Children Act, 1920
- The Tamil Nadu Chit Funds Act, 1961
- The Tamil Nadu Christian Marriages Validation Act, 1934
- The Tamil Nadu Christian Marriages Validation Act, 1952
- The Tamil Nadu Cinemas (Regulation) Act, 1955
- The Tamil Nadu Civil Courts Act, 1873
- The Tamil Nadu Co-Operative Land Development Banks Act, 1934
- The Tamil Nadu Co-Operative Societies (Amendment) Act, 1989
- The Tamil Nadu Co-Operative Societies (Appointment of Special Officers) Act, 1976
- The Tamil Nadu Co-Operative Societies (Appointment of Special Officers) Act, 1989
- The Tamil Nadu Co-Operative Societies (Appointment of Special Officers) Act, 1991
- The Tamil Nadu Co-Operative Societies Act, 1961
- The Tamil Nadu Coffee-Stealing Prevention Act, 1878
- The Tamil Nadu Coinage (Alteration of References) Act, 1960
- The Tamil Nadu Commercial Crops Assessment (Repeal) Act, 1980
- The Tamil Nadu Compulsory Censorship of Publicity Materials Act, 1987
- The Tamil Nadu Compulsory Elementary Education Act, 1994
- The Tamil Nadu Compulsory Labour Act, 1858
- The Tamil Nadu Consolidated Fund (Charged Expenditure) Act, 1950
- The Tamil Nadu Contingency Fund Act, 1954
- The Tamil Nadu Corneal Grafting Act, 1960
- The Tamil Nadu Cotton (Trade Stocks) Census Act, 1949
- The Tamil Nadu Cotton Control Act, 1952
- The Tamil Nadu Court of Wards Act, 1902
- The Tamil Nadu Court-Fees and Suits Valuation Act, 1955
- Tamil Nadu Cultivating Tenants (Payment of Fair Rent) Act, 1956
- Tamil Nadu Cultivating Tenants (Protection From Eviction) Act, 1989
- Tamil Nadu Cultivating Tenants (Protection from Eviction) Act, 1997
- Tamil Nadu Cultivating Tenants (Special Provisions) Act, 1968
- Tamil Nadu Cultivating Tenants (Special Provisions) Amendment Act, 1985
- Tamil Nadu Cultivating Tenants Arrears of Rent (Relief) Act, 1972
- Tamil Nadu Cultivating Tenants Arrears of Rent (Relief) Act, 1980
- Tamil Nadu Cultivating Tenants Arrears of Rent (Relief) Amendment Act, 1991
- Tamil Nadu Cultivating Tenants Protection (Continuance) Act, 1965
- Tamil Nadu Cultivating Tenants Protection and Payment of Fair Rent (Extension to Added Territories) Act, 1963
- Tamil Nadu Cultivating Tenants Protection and Payment of Fair Rent (Extension to Kanyakumari District) Act, 1972
- Tamil Nadu Cultivating Tenants Protection and Payment of Fair Rent (Extension to Shencottah Taluk) Act, 1959
- The Tamil Nadu Cyclone and Flood Affected Areas Cultivating Tenants (Special Provisions) Act, 1986
- The Tamil Nadu Cyclone and Flood Affected Areas Cultivating Tenants Arrears of Rent (Relief) Act, 1980
- The Tamil Nadu Debt Conciliation Act, 1936
- The Tamil Nadu Debt Relief Act, 1972
- The Tamil Nadu Debt Relief Act, 1976
- The Tamil Nadu Debt Relief Act, 1978
- The Tamil Nadu Debt Relief Act, 1979
- The Tamil Nadu Debt Relief Act, 1980
- The Tamil Nadu Debt Relief Act, 1982
- The Tamil Nadu Debtors' Protection Act, 1934
- The Tamil Nadu Decentralization Act, 1914
- The Tamil Nadu Devadasis (Prevention of Dedication) Act, 1947
- The Tamil Nadu District Collectors Powers (Delegation) Act, 1956
- The Tamil Nadu District Development Council Act, 1958
- The Tamil Nadu District Development Councils and Panchayats (Extension to Added Territory Act, 1961
- The Tamil Nadu District Limits Act, 1865
- The Tamil Nadu District Municipalities (Extension to the Transferred Territory) Act, 1959
- The Tamil Nadu District Municipalities Act, 1920
- The Tamil Nadu District Police Act, 1859
- The Tamil Nadu Dr. Ambedkar Law University Act, 1996
- The Tamil Nadu Dramatic Performances Act, 1954
- The Tamil Nadu Drugs (Control) Act, 1949
- The Tamil Nadu Drugs and Other Stores (Unlawful Possession) Act, 1986
- The Tamil Nadu Electricity (Taxation on Consumption) Act, 1962
- The Tamil Nadu Electricity Board (Recovery of Dues) Act, 1978
- The Tamil Nadu Electricity Duty (Validation) Act, 1970
- The Tamil Nadu Electricity Duty Act, 1939
- The Tamil Nadu Electricity Supply Undertakings (Acquisition) Act, 1954
- The Tamil Nadu Enfranchised Inams Act, 1862
- The Tamil Nadu Enfranchised Inams Act, 1866
- The Tamil Nadu Entertainments Tax (Special Provision) Act, 1998
- The Tamil Nadu Entertainments Tax (Special Provisions and Validation) Act, 1986
- The Tamil Nadu Entertainments Tax Act, 1939
- The Tamil Nadu Essential Articles Control and Requisitioning (Temporary Powers) Re-Enacting Act, 1956
- The Tamil Nadu Essential Articles Control and Requisitioning Act, 1949
- The Tamil Nadu Essential Services Maintenance Act, 2002
- The Tamil Nadu Estates (Abolition and Conversion into Ryotwari) Act, 1948
- The Tamil Nadu Estates (Supplementary) Act, 1956
- The Tamil Nadu Estates Communal, Forest and Private Lands (Prohibition of Alienation) Act, 1947
- The Tamil Nadu Estates Land (Reduction of Rent) Act, 1947
- The Tamil Nadu Estates Land Act, 1908
- The Tamil Nadu Famine Relief Fund Act, 1936
- The Tamil Nadu Farmer's Management of Irrigation Systems Act, 2000
- The Tamil Nadu Fiscal Responsibility Act, 2003
- The Tamil Nadu Fisherman and Labourers Engaged in Fishing and other Allied Activities (Social Security and Welfare) Act, 2007
- The Tamil Nadu Fleet Operators Stage Carriages (Acquisition) Act, 1971
- The Tamil Nadu Flood Affected Areas Cultivating Tenants (Temporary Relief) Act, 1986
- The Tamil Nadu Forest (Validation) Act, 1882
- The Tamil Nadu Forest Act, 1882
- The Tamil Nadu Gaming Act, 1930
- The Tamil Nadu General Clauses Act, 1867
- The Tamil Nadu General Clauses Act, 1891
- The Tamil Nadu Gift Goods (Unlawful Possession) Act, 1961
- The Tamil Nadu Gramdan Villages (Repayment of Debts) Act, 1959
- The Tamil Nadu Groundwater (Development and Management) Act, 2003
- The Tamil Nadu Hackney Carriage Act, 1911
- The Tamil Nadu Handloom Workers (Conditions of Employment and Miscellaneous Provisions) Act, 1981
- The Tamil Nadu Highways Act, 2001
- The Tamil Nadu Hill Stations (Preservation of Trees) Act, 1955
- The Tamil Nadu Hindu Religious and Charitable Endowments (Special Provisions) Act, 1996
- The Tamil Nadu Hindu Religious and Charitable Endowments Act, 1959
- The Tamil Nadu Home Guard Act, 1963
- The Tamil Nadu Homoeopathy System of Medicine and Practitioners of Homoeopathy Act, 1971
- Tamil Nadu Horse Race (Abolition of Turf Agencies) Act, 1979
- The Tamil Nadu Horse Races (Abolition of Wagering or Betting) Act, 1974
- The Tamil Nadu Impartible Estates Act, 1904
- The Tamil Nadu Inam Abolition Laws (Validation of Proceedings) Act, 1986
- The Tamil Nadu Inam Estates (Abolition and Conversion into Ryotwari) Act, 1963
- The Tamil Nadu Inams (Assessment) Act, 1956
- The Tamil Nadu Inams (Supplementary) Act, 1963
- The Tamil Nadu Inams Act, 1869
- The Tamil Nadu Indebted Agriculturist (Temporary Relief) Act, 1976
- The Tamil Nadu Indebted Agriculturists (Repayment of Debts) Act, 1955
- The Tamil Nadu Indebted Agriculturists (Temporary Relief) Act, 1954
- The Tamil Nadu Indebted Agriculturists (Temporary Relief) Act, 1975
- The Tamil Nadu Indebted Agriculturists and Indebted Persons (Special Provisions) Act, 1976
- The Tamil Nadu Indebted Persons (Temporary Relief) Act, 1975
- The Tamil Nadu Indebted Persons (Temporary Relief) Act, 1976
- The Tamil Nadu Indian Ports (Amendment) Act, 1925
- The Tamil Nadu Industrial Establishments (Conferment of Permanent Status to Workmen) Act, 1981
- The Tamil Nadu Industrial Establishments (National and Festival Holidays) Act, 1958
- The Tamil Nadu Industrial Township Area Development Authority Act, 1997
- The Tamil Nadu Installation of Oil Engines (Temporary Permission) Act, 1954
- The Tamil Nadu Irrigation (Levy of Betterment Contribution) Act, 1955
- The Tamil Nadu Irrigation (Voluntary Cess) Act, 1942
- The Tamil Nadu Irrigation Cess Act, 1865
- The Tamil Nadu Irrigation Tanks (Improvement) Act, 1949
- The Tamil Nadu Irrigation Works (Construction of Field Bothies) Act, 1959
- The Tamil Nadu Irrigation Works (Repair, Improvement and Construction) Act, 1943
- The Tamil Nadu Judicial Proceedings (Regulation of Reports) Act, 1960
- The Tamil Nadu Jute (Control of Prices and Sales) Act, 1950
- The Tamil Nadu Jute Goods Control Act, 1949
- The Tamil Nadu Khadi and Village Industries Board Act, 1959
- The Tamil Nadu Kidneys (Authority for Use for Therapeutic Purposes) Act, 1987
- The Tamil Nadu Labour Welfare Fund Act, 1972
- The Tamil Nadu Land Improvement Schemes Act, 1959
- The Tamil Nadu Land Reforms (Fixation of Ceiling on Land) Act, 1961
- The Tamil Nadu Land Reforms (Fixation of Ceiling on Land) Act, 1986
- The Tamil Nadu Land Reforms (Reduction of Ceiling on Land) Act, 1970
- The Tamil Nadu Land Revenue and Water-Cess (Surcharge) (Repeal) Act, 1967
- The Tamil Nadu Land-Revenue Assessment Act, 1876
- The Tamil Nadu Lapsed Acts (Removal of Doubts) Act, 1948
- The Tamil Nadu Laws (Special Provisions) Act, 2007
- The Tamil Nadu Laws (Special Provisions) Act, 2008
- The Tamil Nadu Lease-Holds (Abolition and Conversion into Ryotwari) Act, 1963
- The Tamil Nadu Legislature (Prevention of Disqualification) Act, 1967
- The Tamil Nadu Legislature (Prohibition of Simultaneous Membership) Act, 1950
- The Tamil Nadu Levy of Ryotwari Assessment on Free-Hold Lands Act, 1972
- The Tamil Nadu Lifts Act, 1997
- The Tamil Nadu Lignite (Acquisition of Land) Act, 1953
- The Tamil Nadu Limited Proprietors Act, 1911
- The Tamil Nadu Live-Stock Improvement Act, 1940
- The Tamil Nadu Local Authorities Finance Act, 1961
- The Tamil Nadu Local Authorities Loan Act, 1888
- The Tamil Nadu Local Boards (Amendment) Act, 1930
- The Tamil Nadu Manual Worker (Regulation of Employment and Conditions of Work) Act, 1982
- The Tamil Nadu Marine Fishing Regulation Act, 1983
- The Tamil Nadu Maritime Board Act, 1995
- The Tamil Nadu Marumakkattayam (Removal of Doubts) Act, 1955
- The Tamil Nadu Marumakkattayam Act, 1932
- The Tamil Nadu Maternity Benefit (Repeal) Act, 1964
- The Tamil Nadu Medical Registration Act, 1914
- The Tamil Nadu Medicare Service Persons and Medicare Service Institutions (Prevention of Violence and Damage or Loss of Property) Act, 2008
- The Tamil Nadu Merged States States (Laws) Act, 1949
- The Tamil Nadu Minor Inams (Abolition and Conversion into Ryotwari) Act, 1963
- The Tamil Nadu Money-Lenders Act, 1957
- The Tamil Nadu Motor Vehicles (Special Provisions) (Cancellation of Variations of Conditions of Permit) Act, 1996
- The Tamil Nadu Motor Vehicles (Special Provisions) Act, 1992
- The Tamil Nadu Motor Vehicles (Special Provisions)-Repeal Act, 1991
- The Tamil Nadu Motor Vehicles (Taxation of Passengers and Goods) Amendment Act, 1966
- The Tamil Nadu Motor Vehicles Taxation Act, 1974
- The Tamil Nadu Municipal Authorities (Term of office and Election of Councilors) Act, 1963
- The Tamil Nadu Municipal Councils (Appointment of Special Officers) Act, 1976
- The Tamil Nadu Municipal Councils (Appointment of Special Officers) Act, 1991
- The Tamil Nadu Municipal Police Act, 1878
- The Tamil Nadu Nambudri Act, 1932
- The Tamil Nadu New Year (Declaration) Act, 2008
- The Tamil Nadu Non-Trading Companies Act, 1972
- The Tamil Nadu Nurses and Midwives Act, 1926
- The Tamil Nadu Occupants of Kudiyiruppu (Conferment of Ownership) Act, 1971
- The Tamil Nadu Occupants of Kudiyiruppu (Protection from Eviction) Act, 1961
- The Tamil Nadu Occupants of Kudiyiruppu (Protection from Eviction) Re-enacting Act, 1975
- The Tamil Nadu Official Language Act, 1956
- The Tamil Nadu Official Seals Act, 1865
- The Tamil Nadu Oil Palm (Regulation of Production and Processing) Act, 1994
- The Tamil Nadu Open Places (Prevention of Disfigurement) Act, 1959
- The Tamil Nadu Open University Act, 2002
- The Tamil Nadu Outports Landing and Shipping Fees Act, 1885
- The Tamil Nadu Panchayat Court (Validation of Proceedings) Act, 1970
- The Tamil Nadu Panchayat Union Councils (Appointment of Special Officers) Act, 1977
- The Tamil Nadu Panchayat Union Councils (Extension of Term of offices) Act, 1976
- The Tamil Nadu Panchayat Union Councils (Special Provisions for First Constitution) Act, 1960
- The Tamil Nadu Panchayats (Appointment of Special Officers) Act, 1979
- The Tamil Nadu Panchayats (Extension of Term of office) Act, 1976
- The Tamil Nadu Panchayats (Extension to Transferred Territory) and Panchayat Union Councils (Special Provisions for First Constitution) Amendment Act, 1961
- The Tamil Nadu Panchayats (Validation of Local Cess Surcharge) Act, 1982
- The Tamil Nadu Panchayats Act, 1958
- The Tamil Nadu Panchayats Act, 1994
- The Tamil Nadu Panchayats and Panchayat Union Councils (Appointment of Special Officers) Act, 1991
- The Tamil Nadu Panchayats and Panchayat Union Councils (Extension of Term of office) Act, 1975
- The Tamil Nadu Parks, Play-Fields and Open Spaces (Preservation and Regulation) Act, 1959
- The Tamil Nadu Patta Pass Book Act, 1983
- The Tamil Nadu Pawn Brokers Act, 1943
- The Tamil Nadu Payment of Salaries Act, 1951
- The Tamil Nadu Payment of Subsistence Allowance Act, 1981
- The Tamil Nadu Physical Education and Sports University Act, 2004
- The Tamil Nadu Places of Public Resort Act, 1888
- The Tamil Nadu Preservation of Private Forests (Continuance) Act, 1965
- The Tamil Nadu Preservation of Private Forests (Extension to Kanyakumari District) Act, 1979
- The Tamil Nadu Preservation of Private Forests Act, 1949
- The Tamil Nadu Prevention of Begging Act, 1945
- The Tamil Nadu Prevention of Couching Act, 1945
- The Tamil Nadu Prevention of Dangerous Activities of Bootleggers, Drug Offenders, Goondas, Immoral Traffic Offenders and Slum-Grabbers, Act, 1982
- The Tamil Nadu Prevention of Incitement to Refuse or Defer Payment of Tax Act, 1981
- The Tamil Nadu Private Clinical Establishments (Regulation) Act, 1997
- The Tamil Nadu Private Colleges (Regulation) Act, 1976
- The Tamil Nadu Private Educational Institutions (Regulation) Act, 1966
- The Tamil Nadu Private Electricity Supply Undertakings (Acquisition) Act, 1973
- The Tamil Nadu Private Forests (Assumption of Management) Act, 1961
- The Tamil Nadu Prize Schemes (Prohibition) Act, 1979
- The Tamil Nadu Prohibition (Revival of Operation and Amendment) Act, 1974
- The Tamil Nadu Prohibition (Supplementary) Act, 1941
- The Tamil Nadu Prohibition Act, 1937
- The Tamil Nadu Prohibition of Charging Exorbitant Interest Act, 2003
- The Tamil Nadu Prohibition of Eve-Teasing Act, 1998
- The Tamil Nadu Prohibition of Forcible Conversion of Religion Act, 2002
- The Tamil Nadu Prohibition of Ragging Act, 1997
- The Tamil Nadu Prohibition of Ritual and Practice of Burying Alive of a Person Act, 2002
- The Tamil Nadu Prohibition of Smoking and Spitting Act, 2002
- The Tamil Nadu Proprietary Estates Village Service and the Tamil Nadu Hereditary Village-Offices (Repeal) Act, 1968
- The Tamil Nadu Public Health Act, 1939
- The Tamil Nadu Public Libraries Act, 1948
- The Tamil Nadu Public Men Council (Criminal Misconduct) Repeal Act, 1977
- The Tamil Nadu Public Premises (Eviction of Unauthorised Occupants) Act, 1975
- The Tamil Nadu Public Property (Prevention of Damage and Loss) Act, 1992
- The Tamil Nadu Public Property (Prevention of Destruction and Loss) Act, 1982
- The Tamil Nadu Public Property Malversation Act, 1837
- The Tamil Nadu Public Trusts (Regulation of Administration of Agricultural Lands) Act, 1961
- The Tamil Nadu Public Works Engineering Corporation Limited (Acquisition And Miscellaneous Provisions) Act, 1980
- The Tamil Nadu Re-Enacting (No.2) Act, 1948
- The Tamil Nadu Re-Enacting (No.3) Act, 1948
- The Tamil Nadu Re-Enacting Act, 1949
- The Tamil Nadu Re-Enacting and Repealing (No.1) Act, 1948
- The Tamil Nadu Recognised Private Schools (Regulation) Act, 1973
- The Tamil Nadu References to Magistrates in Laws (Special Provisions) Act, 1980
- The Tamil Nadu Registration of Births and Deaths Act, 1899
- The Tamil Nadu Registration of Practitioners of Integrated Medicine Act, 1956
- The Tamil Nadu Registration of Veterinary Practitioners Act, 1957
- The Tamil Nadu Regulation of Admission in Professional Courses Act, 2006
- The Tamil Nadu Relief Undertakings (Special Provisions) Act, 1969
- The Tamil Nadu Rent and Revenue Sales Act, 1839
- The Tamil Nadu Repatriates (Bar of Proceedings) Act, 1969
- The Tamil Nadu Repealing and Amending Act, 1951
- The Tamil Nadu Repealing and Amending Act, 1952
- The Tamil Nadu Repealing and Amending Act, 1955
- The Tamil Nadu Repealing and Amending Act, 1957
- The Tamil Nadu Requisitioning and Acquisition of Immovable Property Act, 1956
- The Tamil Nadu Requisitioning of Motor Vehicles Act, 1970
- The Tamil Nadu Restriction of Habitual Offenders Act, 1948
- The Tamil Nadu Revenue Commissioner Act, 1849
- The Tamil Nadu Revenue Enquiries Act, 1893
- The Tamil Nadu Revenue Recovery Act, 1864
- The Tamil Nadu Revenue Summonses Act, 1869
- The Tamil Nadu Revision of Tariff Rates on Supply of Electrical Energy Act, 1978
- The Tamil Nadu Right to Information Act, 1997
- The Tamil Nadu Rinderpest Act, 1940
- The Tamil Nadu Rivers Conservancy Act, 1884
- The Tamil Nadu Rosewood Trees (Conservation) Act, 1994
- The Tamil Nadu Rural Artisans (Conferment of Ownership of Kudiyiruppu) Act, 1976
- The Tamil Nadu Sale Tax (Settlement of Arrears) Act, 2006
- The Tamil Nadu Sales of Motor Spirit Taxation Act, 1939
- The Tamil Nadu Sales Tax (Settlement of Arrears) Act, 2008
- The Tamil Nadu Sales Tax (Settlement of Disputes) Act, 2002
- The Tamil Nadu Sales Tax (Surcharge) Act, 1971
- The Tamil Nadu Sales Tax Entertainments Tax and Luxury Tax (Settlement of Disputes) Act, 1999
- The Tamil Nadu Scrap Merchants and Dealers in Second-Hand Property and Owners of Automobile Workshops and Tinker Shops (Regulation, Control and Licensing) Act, 1985
- The Tamil Nadu Siddha System of Medicine (Development And Registration of Practitioners) Act, 1997
- The Tamil Nadu Silkworm Diseases (Prevention and Eradication) Act, 1948
- The Tamil Nadu Silkworm Seed (Production, Supply and Distribution) Act, 1956
- The Tamil Nadu Slum Areas (Improvement and Clearance) Act, 1971
- The Tamil Nadu Societies Registration Act, 1975
- The Tamil Nadu Special Economic Zones (Special Provisions) Act, 2005
- The Tamil Nadu Special Security Group Act, 1993
- The Tamil Nadu Specified Commodities Markets (Regulation of Location) Act, 1996
- The Tamil Nadu Stage Carriages and Contract Carriages (Acquisition) Act, 1973
- The Tamil Nadu Stamp (Increase of Duties) Act, 1962
- The Tamil Nadu State Aid to Industries Act, 1922
- The Tamil Nadu State Commission for Women Act, 2008
- The Tamil Nadu State Council for Higher Education Act, 1992
- The Tamil Nadu State Housing Board Act, 1961
- The Tamil Nadu State Legislature (Continuance of Use of English Language) Act, 1964
- The Tamil Nadu State Wakf Board (Validation of Functions of Special Officer) Act, 1975
- The Tamil Nadu Sugar Cane Cess (Validation) Act, 1963
- The Tamil Nadu Sugar Factories Control Act, 1949
- The Tamil Nadu Suppression of Disturbances Act, 1948
- The Tamil Nadu Survey and Boundaries Act, 1923 (Validation) Act, 1924
- The Tamil Nadu Tamil Learning Act, 2006
- The Tamil Nadu Tax on Consumption or Sale of Electricity Act, 2003
- The Tamil Nadu Tax on Entry of Goods into Local Areas Act, 2001
- The Tamil Nadu Tax on Luxuries in Hotels and Lodging Houses Act, 1981
- The Tamil Nadu Tax on Professions, Trades, Callings and Employments Act, 1992
- The Tamil Nadu Taxation Laws (Inapplicability of Limitation) Act, 1985
- The Tamil Nadu Taxation Special Tribunal Act, 1992
- The Tamil Nadu Teachers Education University Act, 2008
- The Tamil Nadu Temple Entry Authorization Act, 1947
- The Tamil Nadu Tenants and Ryots Protection Act, 1949
- The Tamil Nadu Town and Country Planning Act, 1971
- The Tamil Nadu Towns Nuisances Act, 1889
- The Tamil Nadu Traffic Control Act, 1938
- The Tamil Nadu Transferred Territory) Re-Enacting Act, 1957
- The Tamil Nadu Transparency in Tenders Act, 1998
- The Tamil Nadu Tuberculosis Sanatoria (Regulation of Buildings) Act, 1947
- The Tamil Nadu Urban Land (Ceiling and Regulation) Act, 1978
- The Tamil Nadu Urban Land Tax Act, 1966
- The Tamil Nadu Urban Local Bodies (Suspension of Operation) Act, 2000
- The Tamil Nadu Urban Local Bodies Act, 1998
- The Tamil Nadu Value Added Tax Act, 2006
- The Tamil Nadu Veterinary and Animal Sciences University Act, 1989
- The Tamil Nadu Village Courts Act, 1888
- The Tamil Nadu Wakf (Supplementary) Act, 1961
- The Tamil Nadu Wakf Board (Appointment of Special Officers) Act, 1991
- The Tamil Nadu Water Supply and Drainage Board Act, 1970
- The Tamil Nadu Weights and Measures (Enforcement) Act, 1958
- The Tamil Nadu Welfare Board for the Disabled Persons Act, 2007
- The Tamil Nadu Wild Elephants Preservation Act, 1873
- The Tamil Nadu, Bengal and Bombay Children (Supplementary) Act, 1925
- The Tamil University Act, 1982
- The Tanjore Chattram Endowments (Use) Act, 1942
- The Tanjore Pannaiyal Protection Act, 1952
- The Thiruvalluvar University Act, 2002
- The Tiruchirappalli City Municipalities Corporation Act, 1994
- The Tiruchirappalli Kaiaeruvaram and Mattuvaram (Extension of Application) Act, 1964
- The Tiruchirappalli Kaiaeruvaram and Mattuvaram Act, 1958
- The Tirunelveli City Municipal Corporation Act, 1994
- The Tiruppur City Municipal Corporation Act, 2008
- The Toothukudi City Municipal Corporation Act, 2008
- The Travancore-Cochin Lime-Shells (Control) Repeal Act, 1964
- The Tuticorin Port Trust Act, 1924
- The Usurious Loans (Tamil Nadu Amendment) Act, 1936
- The Velliyakundam Impartible Estate Act, 1933
- The Vellore City Municipal Corporation Act, 2008
- The Vexatious Litigation (Prevention) Act, 1949
- The Wakf (Tamil Nadu Amendment) Act, 1982
- Tamil Nadu Agricultural Income Tax Act
- Tamil Nadu Cultivating Tenants Protection Act
- Tamil Nadu District Development Councils Act, 1958
- Tamil Nadu Khadi and Village Industries Board Act, 1959
- Tamil Nadu Land Reforms [Fixation and Ceiling on Land]
- Tamil Nadu Motor Vehicles Taxation Act
- Bharathidasan University Act
- The Tamil Nadu Chit Fund Act & Rules
- Tamil Nadu Dr MGR Medical Chennai University Act, 1987
- The Manonmaniam Sundaranar University Act, 1990
- The Land Reforms Special Appellate Tribunal Regulation
- Tamil Nadu Panchayats Act, 1994
- Tamil Nadu Societies Registration Act, 1975
- The Tamil Nadu Prohibition of Smoking and Spitting Act, 2002
- The Tamil Nadu Highways Act, 2001
- The Tamil Nadu Sales Tax [Settlement of Disputes] Act, 2002
- The Tamil Nadu Tax on Entry of Goods into Local Areas Act, 2001
- Tamil Nadu Farmer's Management of Irrigation Systems Act, 2000
- Tamil Nadu Advocates Clerks Welfare Fund Act, 1999
- Tamil Nadu Sales Tax Entertainments Tax and Luxury Tax Settlements of Disputes Act, 1999
- The Tamil Nadu Acquisition of Land for Industrial Purposes Act,1998
- Tamil Nadu Prohibition of Harassment of Women Act, 1998
- Tamil Nadu Transparency in Tenders Act, 1998
- Tamil Nadu Animals and Birds in Urban areas Control and Regulation Act, 1997
- Tamil Nadu Protection of Interests of Depositors in Financial Establishments Act, 1997
- The Tamil Nadu Lifts Act, 1997
- The Tamil Nadu Siddha System of Medicine Development and Registration of Practitioners Act, 1997
- Tamil Nadu Industrial Township Area Development Authority Act, 1997
- Tamil Nadu Right to Information Act, 1997
- Tamil Nadu Prohibition of Ragging Act, 1997
- Tamil Nadu Private Clinical Establishments (Regulation) Act, 1997
- Tamil Nadu Specified Commodities Markets Regulation of Location Act, 1996
- Tamil Nadu Motor Vehicles Special Provisions Cancellation of Variations of Conditions of Permit Act, 1996
- Tamil Nadu Maritime Board Act, 1995
- Tamil Nadu Compulsory Elementary Education Act, 1994
- Tamil Nadu Apartments Ownership Act, 1994
- Tamil Nadu Aquaculture Regulation Act, 1995
- Tamil Nadu Rosewood Trees Conservation Act, 1994
- The Tamil Nadu Palm (Regulation of Production and Processing) Act, 1994
- Tamil Nadu Palm Products Development Board Act, 1994
- Tamil Nadu Public Property Prevention of Damage and Loss Act, 1992
- Tamil Nadu Agricultural Produce Marketing Act, 1987
- Tamil Nadu Drugs and Other Stores (Unlawful Possession) Act, 1986
- Tamil Nadu Compulsory Censorship of Film Publicity Materials Act, 1987
- Tamil Nadu Compulsory Censorship of Publicity Materials Act, 1987
- The Tamil Nadu Kidney's (Authority for use for the rapetic purposes) Act 1987
- The Tamil Nadu Scrap merchants and Dealers in Second Hand Property and Owners of Automobile Workshop and Tinker Shops Regulation Control and Licensing Act, 1985
- Tamil Nadu Advertisements Tax Act, 1983
- The Tamil Nadu Prohibition of Harassment of Women Act, 1998
- The Tamil Nadu Prohibition of Forcible Conversion of Religion Act, 2002
- The Tamil Nadu Taxation Special Tribunal Act, 1992
- The Tamil Nadu Entertainments Tax Act, 2015
- Tamil Nadu Hindu Religious and Charitable Endowments Act, 1959
- Tamil Nadu Prohibition of Ritual and Practice of Burying Alive of a Person Act, 2002
- The Tamil Nadu Pawn Brokers Act & Rules, 1943
- Tamil Nadu State Aid to Industries Act, 1922
- Tamil Nadu Agricultural Labourers and Farmers Act, 2006

== See also ==
- Government of Tamil Nadu
- Department of Law (Tamil Nadu)
- Madras High Court
- Gazette of Tamil Nadu
- Constitution of India
- Uniform civil code of India
- Law of India
- Indian Penal Code
- Supreme Court of India
