= P. V. Rajaraman =

Retired civil Servant, India

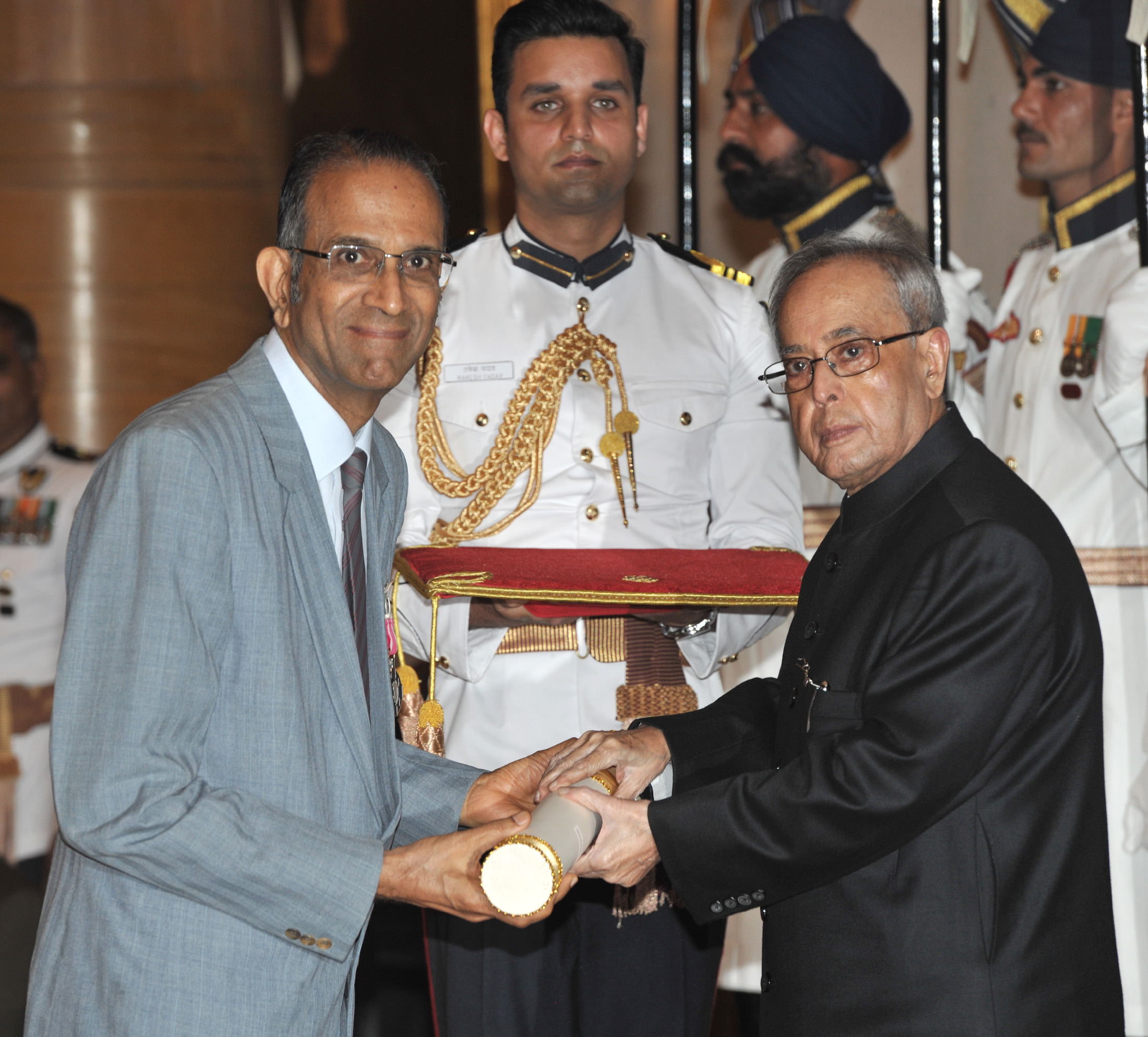
- Born: P. Venkatachalam Rajaraman; 2 February 1944 (age 82); Tamil Nadu, India
- Occupation: Civil servant
- Years active: Since 1967
- Spouse: Vasudha
- Children: 2 children
- Parent(s): P. S. Venkatachalam; Janaki
- Awards: Padma Shri

P. V. Rajaraman, IAS is a retired Indian civil servant, a former managing director of India Cements and a former chairman of Audit committee and Investor Grievance Committee of the Government of India. He was honoured by the Government of India in 2015 with Padma Shri, the fourth highest Indian civilian award.

== Biography ==
P. V. Rajaraman was born on 2 February 1944 in the South Indian state of Tamil Nadu to P. S. Venkatachalam and Janaki. He did his studies at Madras University from where he secured a master's degree in Physics (MSc) and obtained another master's degree in Management (MA) from the University of Leeds, UK. Later, he appeared for the Indian civil service examination in 1967 which he passed with first rank and joined the civil service in July 1967. He served in the IAS for 37 years at various posts including the post of the Principal Secretary at the Ministry of Finance of the Government of Tamil Nadu, till his retirement on 29 February 2004.

During his tenure as a civil servant, Rajaraman held several senior positions such as the chairman and managing director of Tamil Nadu Housing Board, State Commissioner of Sugar, chairman and managing director of Tamil Nadu Sugar Corporation, chairman of Tamil Nadu Industrial Investment Corporation Limited and the director, Ministry of Chemicals and Fertilizers, Government of India. He has also served as the Home Secretary to the Government of Tamil Nadu and as the Finance Secretary to the Government of Tamil Nadu. After retirement from government service, he served as the director of Hindustan Petroleum Corporation from 2007 to 2010, additional director of Indbank Merchant Banking Services from 2009 to 2013 and non executive director of Equitas Holdings from 2011 till date. He has also served as the managing director of India Cements and as the director of Small Industries Development Bank of India.

Rajaraman is married to Vasudha and the couple has a daughter, Veena, and a son, Shiva. The Government of India included him, in 2015, in the Republic Day honours list for the civilian award of Padma Shri.

== See also ==
- Tamil Nadu Housing Board
- Tamil Nadu Sugar Corporation Limited
- Tamil Nadu Industrial Investment Corporation Limited
- Hindustan Petroleum Corporation
- India Cements
- Small Industries Development Bank of India
