= Shilpa Prabhakar Satish =

Indian civil servant

Shilpa Prabhakar Satish I.A.S Collector and District Magistrate, is an officer of the Indian Administrative Service. She is the 215th collector and the first woman collector of Tirunelveli district. She took charge of her office in May 2018, and is known for her bats for Anganwadi, a rural childcare centre in India and to set an example for the public she admitted her 3-year-old daughter to Anganwadi which was welcomed by the people all over India.

== Early life ==
Shilpa Prabhakar Satish was born in Karnataka, India, on 30 August 1981. She graduated in Law from Bangalore University. She placed 46th in the All India UPSC (Union Public Service Commission) examination.

== Career as civil servant ==
- She was the Assistant Collector in Tiruchirapalli district in 2010
- Sub Collector for Tirupattur subdivision of Vellore district between 2011 and 2014
- Deputy Commissioner (Education) at Chennai Corporation for a year
- Executive Vice Chairperson for Industries Guidance and Export Promotion Bureau, Industries department Chennai
- District Collector of Thirunelveli from May 2018 https://tirunelveli.nic.in/collector-profile/

== Awards ==
- In June 2019, Satish received the Tamil Nadu Pollution Control Board's ‘Special Award for Effective Implementation of Plastic Ban’ from Chief Minister Edappadi K. Palaniswami in Chennai.
- In November 2019, the Tirunelveli district administration received the Digital Transformation Award for their work on a system for monitoring polling stations using Geographic information system-based map analysis.
