= Operation Green =

Operation Green (German: Unternehmen Grün) or Case Green (German: Fall Grün) was the name of three separate cancelled German military operations immediately before and during the Second World War.

- Fall Grün (Czechoslovakia), the planned invasion of Czechoslovakia, to be carried out in September 1938
- Operation Green (Ireland), the planned invasion of Ireland in support of the invasion of Britain
- Operation Tannenbaum, the planned invasion of Switzerland, known earlier as Operation Green

Operation Green may also refer to:

- Operation Green (police investigation), a 2000 murder inquiry in the United Kingdom
- Operation Greens, an Indian Government scheme to stabilize the supply of Tomato, Onion and Potato (TOP) crops.
