= Tamil Nadu Gazette =

Government gazette of Tamil Nadu, India

- Type: Government Gazette
- Owner: Government of Tamil Nadu
- Publisher: Department of Stationery and Printing
- Founded: 1800; 226 years ago
- Language: English and Tamil
- Headquarters: Chennai
- Website: www.stationeryprinting.tn.gov.in/gazette.php

Tamil Nadu Gazette is a public journal of the Government of Tamil Nadu, published weekly by the Department of Stationery and Printing. As a public journal, the Gazette prints official notices from the government. The gazette is printed by the Government of Tamil Nadu Press.

== History ==
Gazette of Tamil Nadu was formerly known as The Fort St. George Gazette, Madras during the years 1832–1967. From 1967 it was known as Gazette of Tamil Nadu.

== Types ==
- Tamil Nadu Government Gazette
- Tamil Nadu Government Gazette Extraordinary

== Work ==
The Department of Stationery and Printing is headed by the Director of Stationery and Printing with the other senior Government officers. The gazette employs more than 1646 people under the supervision of the Department of Stationery and Printing.

== See also ==
- Government Gazette
- Department of Law (Tamil Nadu)
- Tamil Nadu Government Laws & Rules
- The Gazette of India
- Constitution of India
