= Punjab Agri Export Corporation =

Punjab Agri Export Corporation Limited
- Industry: Agriculture, Horticulture, Food Processing, Export
- Founded: 1997
- Brands: Five Rivers; AASNAA
- Parent: Punjab Agro Industries Corporation Limited (PAIC)

Punjab Agri Export Corporation Limited (PAGREXCO) is a government enterprise established by the Government of Punjab in the year 1997 as the nodal agency for agricultural export from the state of Punjab, India. The company works for export of fresh and processed agricultural produce, infrastructural development and policy implementation in the state. It is a subsidiary of Punjab Agro Industries Corporation.

The company has been awarded Sustainable Development Goals Action Award by the Punjab Planning Department for Sustainable Organic Production and Innovative Marketing System. It has also received Leadership award in Agriculture Marketing.

== Activities and functions ==
PAGREXCO is working with the Airports Authority of India for modernization of perishable cargo facility at Amritsar airport and has established a facility at Chandigarh Airport. It is the state implementing agency for the Operation Greens scheme for Kinnow Crop under Aatmanirbhar Bharat Abhiyan. It has started first-of-its-kind program using blockchain technology for organic products for traceability, certification and transparency starting with seed potato. PAGREXCO is the nodal agency for implementation of Agriculture Export Policy in Punjab. and for promoting farmer-producer organizations (FPO). Through implementation programs by PAGREXCO, the state of Punjab has won the Jaivik India Award for organic farming. PAGREXCO has set up five mechanical sorting, grading, waxing centers with capacity of 2 MT/hour for kinnow

List of functions of PAGREXCO are as follows-

- Exporting fresh and seasonal agricultural produces, chiefly fruits, vegetables, and flowers.
- Exporting processed agricultural produce.
- Setting up the state-of-the-art infrastructure for facilitating organic farming.
- Introducing and developing high-tech agri technologies.
- Promoting joint ventures for export-oriented agro/horticulture farms.
- Dealing with all sorts of chemical and equipment-based needs for farming

As per the Government of Punjab, PAGREXCO is the mandated agency to implement the Organic Program by providing institutional support to the organic farmers of the state under various Government of India schemes To educate the farmers about product development and branding to market their produce, PAGREXCO has launched a weekly TV show on Doordarshan Jalandhar and Doordarshan Punjabi Chief minister of Punjab Captain Amrinder Singh has supported PAGREXCO's activities towards the Kinnow farmers in the state.

PAGREXCO has introduced an Agricultural Export Policy for medium to long term export development, strengthening back-end and front-end infrastructure, developing production and export clusters and building capacity among farmers. The company also provides organic certification to eligible farmers.

Punjab Agro has outperformed Mexico in the export of chilli paste to the gulf and middle eastern market. The company directly procures chilies from farmers, processes it and exports to international markets as per buyer specifications.

The company facilitates/markets over 25000 metric tons of Kinnow Mandarins from the state. PAGREXCO is the biggest aggregator of fruit brand "Punjab Kinnow" and uses advanced post harvest technology with edible fruit wax imported from Spain and volume metric grading (to determine post-harvest packaging standards) to extend the fruit’s shelf life up to 60 days.The company has also started home delivery services in Chandigarh-Mohali-Panchkula area with a business model favourable to farmers to ensure they get proper marketing through the "Five Rivers" brand. For developing Potato and Seed Potato exports from Punjab, the company also conducts capacity-building activities for Farmers in Punjab's Potato Cluster (Districts Jalandhar, Nawanshahr, Kapurthala, Hoshiarpur).

In 2019, Punjab government, through PAGREXCO partnered with agri-tech startup Cropin in order to "improve the quality of potato seed production in the State" and implement "Seed Potato Traceability".

== Brands ==
PAGREXCO has established a brand to market its products by the name of Five Rivers. The products include certified organic and traceable food items along with processed products. These products are marketed domestically at company owned stores by the name of "Organic Hut", at retail stores and also exported abroad.

The company has a joint venture with UNATI Cooperative Marketing-cum-Processing Society Ltd by the name of Punjab Agro UNATI Gramin Marketing Private Ltd (PUGMARK), under which a common brand by the name of AASNAA has been created.

== Agriculture Export Policy ==
In December 2019, PAGEXCO had come up with an Agriculture Export Policy (AEP). It focused on having a medium-term to long-term strategy to increase exports of agricultural produce from Punjab by strengthening back-end and front-end infrastructure to boost the export of fresh and value-added fruits and vegetables. It also talked of identifying focused commodities and clusters for developing export-related infrastructure and undertake capacity building of farmers towards making them ready to explore the markets abroad.

== Operation Greens ==
In the budget speech of Union Budget 2018-19, The scheme “Operation Greens” was announced on the line of “Operation Flood”, with an outlay of Rs.500 crore to promote Farmer Producers Organizations (FPO), agri-logistics, processing facilities and professional management. PAGREXCO is responsible for its implementation in the state of Punjab. Important measures taken include price stabilization intervention, transport subsidies, storage subsidies etc.

== COVID relief ==
PAGREXCO is appointed by the Punjab State government as the nodal agency for the import of COVID relief material, facilitating the entire process and free distribution
