= Tamil Nadu Horticulture Development Agency =

Tamil Nadu Horticulture Development Agency (TANHODA)
- Native name: தமிழ்நாடு தோட்டக்கலை வளர்ச்சி முகமை
- Type: Nodal Agency
- Industry: Agriculture
- Founded: 18 June 2004
- Headquarters: Chennai, Tamil Nadu, India
- Area served: Tamil Nadu, India
- Key people: Thiru.Sandeep Saxena, I.A.S.
- Services: Agricultural marketing
- Owner: Government of Tamil Nadu
- Parent: Department of Agriculture (Tamil Nadu)
- Website: www.tanhoda.gov.in

The Tamil Nadu Horticulture Development Agency (TANHODA) was constituted with the objective to rto chanelise the central assistance in a larger scale to promote Horticulture

== History ==
- Tamil Nadu Horticulture Development Agency (TANHODA) was formed on 18 June 2004 vide G.O.Ms.No.91 (Agri) dated 27.03.2000 to channelise the central assistance in a larger scale to promote Horticulture. It has been registered as a Society under Tamil Nadu Societies Registration Act 1975

== Functions And Powers of the Agency ==
The following are the Functions And Powers of the Board:

- TANHODA acts as a Special Purpose Vehicle for the purpose of implementing various schemes like National Horticulture Mission, Micro Irrigation or Drip Irrigation, Precision Farming and National Bamboo Mission

== Activities of Board ==
- Training to Farmers and Staff
- Domestic and Export Market Intelligence Cell (DEMIC) was established in November 2004
- Publications: Tamil Nadu State Marketing Board published many useful books on various branches of Agriculture
- Exhibition

== See also ==
- Agricultural produce market committee
- National Agricultural Cooperative Marketing Federation of India
