= Department of Industries, Investment Promotion and Commerce =

Governmental department of Tamil Nadu, India

Department of Industries, Investment Promotions and Commerce in the Government of Tamil Nadu
- Tamil Nadu Arasin Thozhil Mudhaleetu Ookavippu Mattrum Varthagatth Thurai
- The Emblem of the Government of Tamil Nadu

Agency overview
- Jurisdiction: Tamil Nadu
- Headquarters: Chennai
- Minister responsible: S. Keerthana, Minister for Industries, Investment Promotions and Commerce in the Government of Tamil Nadu
- Agency executive: P. Senthil Kumar, IAS, Secretary to the Government
- Parent agency: Government of Tamil Nadu
- Child agency: Directorate of Industries and Commerce, Tamil Nadu
- Website: Industries Department

The Department of Industries, Investment Promotions and Commerce is one of the departments of Government of Tamil Nadu.

== Objective ==
The objective of the department is to promote industrial growth by facilitating setting up of major industries and promotion for attraction of investments into the state.

== Sub-departments ==
The following sub-departments operate under the department:

Sub-departments

- Department of Sugar
- Directorate of Industries and Commerce

Undertakings and bodies

- Southern Structurals Limited (SSL)
- State Industries Promotion Corporation of Tamil Nadu (SIPCOT)
- Tamil Nadu Cement Corporation Limited (TANCEM)
- Tamil Nadu Co-operative Sugar Federation (TNCSF)
- Tamil Nadu Industrial Development Corporation (TIDCO)
- Tamil Nadu Industrial Explosives Limited (TEL)
- Tamil Nadu Industrial Investment Corporation Limited (TIIC)
- Tamil Nadu Newsprint and Papers Limited (TNPL)
- Tamil Nadu Salt Corporation Limited (TNSALT)
- Tamil Nadu Sugar Corporation Limited (TASCO)
- Guidance Tamil Nadu (Invest TN)

== Ministers ==
- S. Keerthana (2026-present)
- T. R. B. Rajaa (2023-2026)
- Thangam Thennarasu (2021-23)
- M. C. Sampath (2016-21)
- P. Thangamani (2011-16)

== See also ==
- Government of Tamil Nadu
- Tamil Nadu Government's Departments
- Ministry of Coal (India)
- Ministry of Commerce and Industry (India)
- Ministry of Mines (India)
- Ministry of Micro, Small and Medium Enterprises
- Ministry of Steel (India)
- Ministry of Heavy Industries and Public Enterprises (India)

== See also ==
- Government of Tamil Nadu
- Tamil Nadu Government's Departments
