= Tamil Nadu Horticultural Producers Co-operative Enterprises Limited =

Tamil Nadu Horticultural Producers Co-operative Enterprises Limited (TANHOPE)
- Native name: தமிழ்நாடு தோட்டக்கலை உற்பத்தியாளர்கள் கூட்டுறவு சங்கம்
- Type: Nodal Agency
- Industry: Agriculture
- Founded: 18 January 1995
- Headquarters: Chennai, Tamil Nadu, India
- Area served: Tamil Nadu, India
- Key people: Thiru.Sandeep Saxena, I.A.S
- Services: Agricultural marketing
- Owner: Government of Tamil Nadu
- Parent: Department of Agriculture (Tamil Nadu)

The Tamil Nadu Horticultural Producers Co-operative Enterprises Limited (TANHOPE) was constituted with the objective to rto chanelise the central assistance in a larger scale to promote Horticulture.

== History ==
Tamil Nadu Horticulture Development Agency (TANHODA) was formed on 18.06.2004 vide G.O.Ms.No.91 (Agri) dated 27.03.2000 to channelise the central assistance in a larger scale to promote Horticulture. It has been registered as a Society under Tamil Nadu Societies Registration Act 1975.

== Functions And Powers of the Agency ==
The following are the Functions And Powers of the Board:

- TANHODA acts as a Special Purpose Vehicle for the purpose of implementing various schemes like National Horticulture Mission, Micro Irrigation, Precision Farming and National Bamboo Mission

== Activities of Board ==
- Training to Farmers and Staff
- Domestic and Export Market Intelligence Cell (DEMIC) was established in November 2004
- Publications: Tamil Nadu State Marketing Board published many useful books on various branches of Agriculture
- Exhibition

== See also ==
- Agricultural produce market committee
- National Agricultural Cooperative Marketing Federation of India
