= Guidance Tamil Nadu =

Government investment promotion agency

- தமிழ் நாடு தொழில் வழிகாட்டி நிறுவனம்

Agency overview
- Formed: 15 July 1992; 34 years ago
- Preceding agency: Tamil Nadu Industrial Guidance & Export Promotion Bureau
- Jurisdiction: Government of Tamil Nadu
- Headquarters: Chennai
- Employees: 60+
- Agency executives: S. Vijayakumar, IAS, (Chairman - Additional Chief Secretary to Government, Industries); Deepak Jacob, IAS, (Managing Director & CEO); Alarmelmangai, IAS, (Executive Director)
- Parent agency: Industries, Investment Promotion & Commerce Department
- Website: investingintamilnadu.com

Guidance Tamil Nadu (formerly Tamil Nadu Industrial Guidance and Export Promotion Bureau) is the nodal investment promotion agency of the Government of Tamil Nadu. Established in 1992, it plays a central role in attracting and supporting investments across sectors in the state of Tamil Nadu. Operating under the Industries, Investment Promotion and Commerce Department, Guidance Tamil Nadu provides end-to-end support to investors and functions under the purview of Minister S. Keerthana.

== History ==
Guidance Tamil Nadu was established as a non-profit registered Society with the objective of attracting major investments into the state. It is headquartered in Chennai, comprising a team of over 60 professionals with expertise in business, law, economics, policy, and analytics.

Guidance, under the aegis of the Industries Department, and in collaboration with other Government departments and agencies, undertook several measures to mitigate the effects of the pandemic for industries and carried out several initiatives to restore the confidence of the investors.

== Partnerships ==
Partnering with the World Economic Forum (WEF), it established India’s first advanced manufacturing hub (AMHUB) in Tamil Nadu. It is one of the 19 AMHUBs in the world. This platform focuses on engaging entire regional production ecosystems to identify and address regional opportunities and challenges brought by the Fourth Industrial Revolution by amplifying regional success stories, sharing best practices & incubating new partnerships.

It also entered into an agreement with Indian School of Business (ISB) to work on a broader objective of economic recovery and growth. It is a tripartite partnership where Academia, Government and Industry come together to work on economic development of the State.

== Other Key Industrial Promotion Organisations of Government of Tamil Nadu ==
Sl. No	Company	Incorporated	Headquarters	Department	Role	Type	Remarks	Website
1	State Industries Promotion Corporation of Tamil Nadu Limited (SIPCOT)	1972	Chennai	Industries	Large & Medium scale Industries Promotion	State Govt. Body		www.sipcot.com
2	Tamil Nadu Industrial Development Corporation Limited (TIDCO)	1965	Chennai	Industries	Industrial Infrastructure Services/Finances	State Govt. Undertaking	NBFC	tidco.tn.gov.in
3	Tamil Nadu Small Industries Development Corporation Limited (SIDCO)	1970	Chennai	Micro, Small and Medium Enterprises	Small-scale Industries Promotion	State Govt. Undertaking		www.sidco.tn.nic.in
