= Department of Environment and Forests =

Department of Government of Tamil Nadu

Department of Environment and Forests (Tamil Nadu)

Agency overview
- Formed: 1995 (31 years ago)
- Jurisdiction: Tamil Nadu
- Headquarters: Chennai
- Ministers responsible: R. V. Ranjithkumar, Minister of Forests Department; Rajeev, Minister of Environment department
- Agency executive: Dr. P. Senthil Kumar, IAS, Principal Secretary to Government
- Parent agency: Government of Tamil Nadu
- Child agencies: Tamil Nadu Forest Department; Tamil Nadu Pollution Control Board
- Website: Environment and Forests Department

The Department of Environment and Forests is one of the departments of Government of Tamil Nadu. The department was created in 1995 and is responsible for environmental management and forests in the state.

== Forests ==
Tamil Nadu Forest Department is the nodal agency responsible for the protection and management of forests in the state. Forests occupy an area of 22,643 km^{2} (8,743 sq mi) constituting 17.4% of the geographic area. The state has varies forest ecosystems with the Western Ghats being one of the eight hottest biodiversity hotspots in the world and a UNESCO World Heritage Site. There are about 2,000 species of wildlife that are native to Tamil Nadu and more than 5900 species of plants.

The department is also responsible for the management of wildlife protection areas. Protected areas cover an area of 3,305 km^{2} (1,276 sq mi), constituting 2.54% of the geographic area and 15% of the 22,643 km^{2} (8,743 sq mi) recorded forest area of the state. Important ecological regions of Tamil Nadu are the Nilgiri Biosphere Reserve in the Nilgiri Hills, the Agasthyamala Biosphere Reserve in the Agastya Mala-Cardamom Hills and Gulf of Mannar coral reefs. The state has five National Parks, 18 wildlife sanctuaries, five elephant sanctuaries as per Project Elephant, five tiger reserves as per Project Tiger and seventeen bird sanctuaries in Tamil Nadu. There is one conservation reserve, two zoos recognised by the Central Zoo Authority of India and five crocodile farms. The department also manages the Government Rubber Corporation, Tamil Nadu Forest Plantation Corporation Limited (TAFCORN), Tamil Nadu Tea Plantation Corporation (TANTEA) and Tamil Nadu Biodiversity Conservation And Greening Society (TNBCGS).

== Environment ==
The Environment department is responsible for pollution control across various ecosystems through the Tamil Nadu Pollution Control Board. The department formulates policies to mitigate the impact of pollution in water bodies, control of air and noise pollution, climate change adaptation and coastal regulation.

== See also ==
- Government of Tamil Nadu
- Tamil Nadu Government's Departments
- Ministry of Environment and Forests (India)
- Department of Environment (Kerala)
- Van Vigyan Kendra (VVK) Forest Science Centres
