= Tamil Nadu State Agricultural Marketing Board =

- Native name: தமிழ்நாடு மாநில வேளாண்மை விற்பனை வாரியம்
- Company type: Statutory corporation
- Industry: Agriculture
- Founded: 24.10.1970
- Headquarters: Chennai, Tamil Nadu, India
- Area served: Tamil Nadu, India
- Key people: Thiru Sandeep Saxena, I.A.S
- Services: Agricultural marketing
- Owner: Government of Tamil Nadu
- Parent: Department of Agriculture (Tamil Nadu)
- Website: www.tnsamb.gov.in

The Tamil Nadu State Agricultural Marketing Board (TNSAMB) was constituted by an executive order of the State Government in G.O. Ms. No.2852 Agriculture Department, dated: 24.10.1970 and functioning since 24.10.1970, with the objective to regulate the activities of Market Committees and to act as an advisory body.

== History ==
The TNSAMB was functioning as a non-statutory board, and was reconstituted as a statutory board in accordance with the new Act "The Tamilnadu Agricultural Produce Marketing (Regulation) Act 1987" which was brought into force from 1-2-1991, as per Government order No.299 Agriculture (AM I) Department, dated 13-6-1995.

== Functions and powers of the board ==
The following are the functions and powers of the board:

- The co-ordination of the working of the market committees and other affairs thereof including programmes undertaken by the market committees for the development of markets and market areas.
- To undertake State level planning of the development of the agriculture produce markets.
- To administer the Market Board Fund and the Market Development Fund.
- To the giving of direction of market committees in general of any market committee in particular with a view to ensure improvement thereof.
- To supervise and guide the Market Committees in the preparation of plans and estimates of construction programme undertaken by the market committees.
- To execute all works chargeable to the Market Board Fund.
- To maintain accounts in such forms as may be prescribed.
- To publish annually at the close of the year, its progress report, balance sheet and statement of assets and liabilities and send copies thereof to each member of the Board and the Government.
- To make necessary arrangements for propaganda and publicity on matters relating to marketing of agricultural produces.
- To provide facilities for the training of officers and staff of the Market Committees, Board, Department of Agricultural Marketing, Producers and Traders in the State.
- To prepare and adopt budget for the ensuing year.
- To grant subventions or loans to Market Committees for the purposes of this Act on such terms and conditions as the Board may determine.
- To arrange or organise seminars, workshops, exhibitions etc., on subjects relating to agricultural marketing.
- To impart education in regulated marketing of agricultural produce.
- To promote schemes for processing, grading and standardization of agricultural produce.
- The collection and dissemination of market information.
- For the publication of market statistics and studies.
- The levy of subscription for collection and dissemination of information relating to agricultural marketing.
- To conduct market research and market surveys.
- To do such other things as may be of general interest to market committee or considered necessary for the efficient functioning of the Board.
- Any other function specifically entrusted to it by this Act; and
- Such other functions of like nature as may be enstrusted to the Board by the Government.

== Activities of the board ==
- Training to farmers and staff
- Domestic and Export Market Intelligence Cell (DEMIC) was established in November 2004
- Tamil Nadu State Marketing Board published many useful books on various branches of agriculture
- Exhibition
- Promotion of protection of farmers to appreciate their work

== See also ==
- Agricultural produce market committee
- National Agricultural Cooperative Marketing Federation of India
