= List of denotified communities of Tamil Nadu =

The following is the list of the denotified tribes of Tamil Nadu, India.

- Ambalakarar (Thanjavur, Nagapattinam, Tiruvarur, Tiruchirapalli, Karur, Perambalur, Sivaganga, Virudunagar and Pudukottai Districts)
- Kallar (Sivaganga, Virudhunagar, Ramanathapuram, Madurai, Theni, Dindigul, Pudukottai, Thanjavur, Nagapattinam, Tiruvarur, Kanchipuram Districts)
- Kaladi (Sivaganga, Virudhunagar, Ramanathapuram, Madurai, Theni, Dindigul, Thanjavur, Nagapattinam, Thiruvarur, Pudukottai, Tiruchirapalli, Karur and Perambalur Districts)
- Koravar (Madurai, Theni, Tiruchirapalli, Dindigul, Ramanathapuram, Thirunelaveli, Nagapattinam, Sivaganga, Salem, Dharmapuri, Namakkal, Erode, Coimbatore, Tirupur, Karur, Perambalur, Viruthunagar, Nagapattinam, Tiruvarur, Thiruvannamalai Districts)
- Maravar (Karur, Thanjavur, Nagapattinam, Tiruvarur, Pudukottai, Ramanathapuram, Sivaganga, Virudhunagar, Tirunelveli, Thoothukudi, Madurai Districts)
- Punnan Vettuva Gounder (Tiruchirapalli, Karur, Perambalur and Pudukottai Districts)
- Telungapattti Chettis (Karur, Madurai, Perambalur and Pudukottai Districts)
- Thottia Naicker (Sivaganga, Virudunagar, Ramanathapuram, Kancheepuram, Tiruvallur, Thanjavur, Nagapattinam, Tiruvarur, Tiruchirapalli, Karur, Perambalur, Pudukottai, Tirunelveli, Thoothukudi, Salem Districts)
- Urali Gounder (Tiruchirapalli, Karur, Perambalur and Pudukottai Districts)
- Valayars (Madurai, Theni, Dindigul, Tiruchirapalli, Karur, Perambalur, Pudukottai, Sivaganga, Virudunagar, Erode and Coimbatore Districts)
- Vettaikarar (Thanjavur, Nagapattinam, Tiruvarur, Pudukottai, Thiruvannamalai, Salem, Namakkal Districts)
- Vettuva Gounder (Tiruchirapalli, Karur, Perambalur and Pudukottai Districts)
