= Department of Law (Tamil Nadu) =

Indian state government department

Agency overview
- Formed: 1811
- Jurisdiction: Tamil Nadu
- Headquarters: Chennai
- Minister responsible: CTR Nirmal Kumar, Minister for Law Department
- Agency executive: Tmt. P. Sumathi, H.J.S., Secretary to Government
- Parent agency: Government of Tamil Nadu
- Website: Law Department

The Department of Law is one of the departments of Government of Tamil Nadu.

== Objective ==
The basic objectives of the department are to prepare draft bills to implement policy decision of the government, action to publish laws/acts after passage in the legislative assembly, advise on legal issues referred to it by all the departments, response to statutory rules, notifications and orders wherein the state government are a party and litigation on behalf of the government.

== Sub-divisions ==
The following sub-divisions operate under the department:

Sub-departments

- Directorate of Legal Studies
- State Official Language Department

Undertakings and bodies

- Tamil Nadu State National Law School
- Tamil Nadu Dr. Ambedkar Law University (TNDALU)
- Tamil Nadu State Legal Services Authority

== Ministers ==
Ministers of Law (Tamilnadu)
Name	Term of office	
Durai Murugan	2006	2011
S. P. Velumani	2011	2013
K. P. Munusamy	2013	2016
C. V. Shanmugam	2016	2021
S. Regupathy	2021	2025
Durai Murugan	2021	2026

== See also ==
- Government of Tamil Nadu
- Tamil Nadu Government's Departments
- Ministry of Law and Justice (India)
- Tamil Nadu Government Laws & Rules
