= Tamil Nadu Electrical Licensing Board =

Agency overview
- Formed: 16 November 1955
- Jurisdiction: Tamil Nadu
- Headquarters: Industrial Estate, Guindy, Chennai
- Agency executive: President, Chief Electrical Inspector to Government
- Parent agency: Department of Energy
- Website: http://www.tnelb.gov.in/

Tamil Nadu Electricity Licensing Board is an organisation of the state Government of Tamil Nadu in India. The organisation is responsible for issuing and renewing competence certificates and licences to contractors.

== History and role ==
The Licensing Board was established under the provisions of the Indian Electricity Rules 1956. The Chief Electrical Inspector to Government is the President of the Licensing Board.
