= Department of Agriculture (Tamil Nadu) =

Indian state government agency

Agriculture and Farmers' Welfare Department (Tamil Nadu)

Agency overview
- Formed: 1949
- Jurisdiction: Tamil Nadu
- Headquarters: Chennai
- Minister responsible: R. Vinoth
- Agency executive: Apoorva, IAS, Agricultural Production Commissioner and Principal Secretary to Government
- Parent agency: Government of Tamil Nadu
- Website: Agriculture Department

The Department of Agriculture and Farmers' Welfare is one of the departments of Government of Tamil Nadu.

== Objective ==
As of 2022, agriculture contributed to 13% of the state's GSDP. As of 2022, the state had 6.15 million hectares under cultivation. The department is responsible to ensure stable agricultural production, devise and implement methodologies to increase food production and ensure availability of raw materials for agro-based industries.

== Sub-departments ==
The department has the following sub-departments:

- Agricultural research, education and extension
- Agriculture
- Agriculture engineering
- Agriculture marketing and business department
- Horticulture and plantation crops department
- Organic certification department
- Seed certification department
- Sugar

The following agencies and undertakings are administered by the department:

- Tamil Nadu Horticulture Development Agency (TANHODA):Maintenance of public gardens and implementation of various schemes like National Horticulture Mission, Drip Irrigation, Precision Farming and National Bamboo Mission.
- Tamil Nadu Horticultural Producers Co-operative Enterprises Limited (TANHOPE):Promotion of horticulture crops, marketing of Fruits and vegetables and processed produces.
- Tamil Nadu Watershed Development Agency (TAWDEVA):Responsible for improvement of income of rural community in the watersheds by boosting crop productivity.
- Tamil Nadu Agricultural University (TNAU):Agricultural university located in Coimbatore and responsible for education and research on agriculture.
- Tamil Nadu State Agricultural Marketing Board (TNSAMB):Co-ordination of market committees, planning and implementation of programmes for the development of markets and market areas.

== Ministers ==
- Veerapandy S. Arumugam (1990-91, 1996-2001, 2006-11)
- Ku. Pa. Krishnan (1991-96)
- K. A. Sengottaiyan (2011-12)
- S. Damodaran (2012-14)
- R. Vaithilingam (2014-16)
- R. Doraikannu (2017-20)
- M. R. K. Panneerselvam (2021-2026)

== See also ==
- Government of Tamil Nadu
- Tamil Nadu Government's Departments
- Ministry of Agriculture (India)
- Tamil Nadu Agricultural University
