= Department of Labour and Employment (Tamil Nadu) =

Government department of Tamil Nadu state, India

Department of Labour Welfare and Skill Development (Tamil Nadu)

Agency overview
- Formed: 1972
- Jurisdiction: Tamil Nadu
- Headquarters: Chennai
- Minister responsible: J.Mohamed Farvas, Minister for Labour Welfare and Skill Development Department
- Agency executive: Kumar Jayant, IAS, Additional Chief Secretary to Government
- Parent agency: Government of Tamil Nadu
- Website: Labour Welfare and Skill Development Department

The Department of Labour Welfare and Skill Development is one of the departments of Government of Tamil Nadu.

== History ==
The department of labour and employment was formed in 1972, when Government of Tamil Nadu trifurcated the Industries, Labour and Housing Department.

== Objective ==
The department of labour is responsible for administering matters relating to Industrial relations, safety of workers, labor Welfare, employment exchanges and technical training. The department is responsible for the enforcement of various provisions and acts enacted by the Government of India and the state government concerning the subjects.

== Sub-divisions ==
The following sub-divisions and undertakings operate under the department:

Sub-departments

- Department of Labour: Industrial relations and labor welfare
- Department of Employment and Training: Employment facilitation and training
- Directorate of Industrial Safety and Health: Safety in industries and factories

Undertakings and bodies

- Overseas Manpower Corporation Limited
- Tamil Nadu Labour Welfare Board
- Tamil Nadu Construction Workers Welfare Board
- Tamil Nadu Manual Workers Social Security and Welfare Board
- Tamil Nadu State Contract Labour Advisory Board
- Tamil Nadu Plantation Labour Housing Advisory Board
- Tamil Nadu State Labour Advisory Board
- Tamil Nadu Washermen Welfare Board
- Tamil Nadu Hairdressers Welfare Board
- Tamil Nadu Auto Rickshaw and Taxi Drivers Welfare Board
- Tamil Nadu Domestic Workers Welfare Board
- Tamil Nadu Tailoring Workers Welfare Board
- Tamil Nadu Handicrafts Workers Welfare Board
- Tamil Nadu Handlooms and Handloom Silk Weavers Welfare Board
- Tamil Nadu Pottery Workers Welfare Board
- Tamil Nadu Goldsmiths Welfare Board
- Tamil Nadu Artists Welfare Board
- Tamil Nadu Footwear, Leathers Goods Manufactory and Tannery Workers Welfare Board
- Tamil Nadu Powerloom Weaving Workers Welfare Board
- The Tamil Nadu Institute of Labour Studies

== See also ==
- Government of Tamil Nadu
- Tamil Nadu Government's Departments
- Ministry of Labour and Employment (India)
