= National Agricultural Cooperative Marketing Federation of India =

Indian marketing cooperative

- Industry: Marketing of agricultural produce
- Founded: 2 October 1958
- Headquarters: Ashram Chowk, New Delhi, India
- Key people: Jethabhai Ahir (Chairman)
- Website: nafed-india.com

The National Agricultural Cooperative Marketing Federation of India (NAFED) is an organization of marketing cooperatives for agricultural produce in India. It was founded on the birthday of Mahatma Gandhi on 2 October 1958 to promote the trade of agricultural produce and forest resources across the nation. It is registered under Multi State Co-operative Societies Act. Headquarters in New Delhi, NAFED has four regional offices at Delhi, Mumbai, Chennai and Kolkata, apart from 28 zonal offices.

NAFED is the nodal agency to implement price stabilization measures under Operation Greens which aims to double the farmers' income by 2022. NAFED along with FCI with proactive role of state governments also physically procures oilseeds, pulses and copra under the Price Support Scheme (PSS) which in turn is under the umbrella scheme of PM-AASHA. In 2008, it established, National Spot Exchange, a Commodities exchange as a joint venture of Financial Technologies (India) Ltd. (FTIL).

== See also ==
- Tamil Nadu State Agricultural Marketing Board (TNSAMB)
