= Operation Greens =

Operation Greens is a project approved by the Ministry of Food Processing Industries with the target to stabilise the supply of tomato, onion and potato crops (TOP crops) in India, as well as to ensure their availability around the country, year-round without price volatility. It was first introduced in the 2018-2019 Union budget of India, and has been allocated Rs 500 crores to promote farmer producers' organisations (FPOs), agri-logistics, processing facilities and professional management.

== Introduction and objectives ==
The operation was first introduced by the Finance Minister of India, Arun Jaitley while presenting the 2018-2019 Union budget. It intended to stabilise the supply of tomatoes, onions and potato crops. Union Minister, Harsimrat Kaur Badal has stated that "price volatility of TOP crops wreaks havoc in the households of this country" and that "we have decided the strategy to stabilise prices of TOP crops and to make sure that TOP crops reach all households in the country round the year".

TOP crops are considered a regular food commodity across India, but production declined in 2017-18 compared to the previous year despite a 4.5% increase on overall horticulture production. In an attempt to increase and stabilise the production of these crops, Operation Greens was introduced with the following objectives:

The operation aims to replicate the success of the increase in production of milk in India through the implementation of Operation Flood. The operation will also aid in India's goal of doubling farmer's income by the year 2022.

== Strategy ==
The strategy to meeting the objectives has been split into two components: short term price stabilisation measures and long term integrated value chain development projects.

=== Short term price stabilisation measures ===
The National Agricultural Cooperative Marketing Federation of India is the principal agency placed in charge of implementing the price stabilisation measures. The Ministry of Food Processing Industries will be providing 50% of the subsidy for:

- the transportation of TOP crops from farms to storage centres.
- the hiring of storage facilities for use by TOP crops.

As part of price stabilisation measures, if prices fall below preceding 3-years average market price at the time of harvest, the evacuation of surplus production from the producing area to consumption centres will be undertaken. A dedicated agency will also be formed to monitor market intelligence, provide demand forecasts and be an advisory to farmers on future prices in relation to TOP crops in order to monitor the supply scenario and implement timely market intervention where necessary.

These measures have been put in place in the hopes that by subsidising the costs, farmers will be able to turn a higher profit. When the production of such crops increase, prices collapse and farmers do not have enough storage capacity and links to organised retailing is small. As such, farmers generally get paid only a quarter of what consumers pay. The aim is to increase profits for the farmers by reducing losses post-harvest in the hope that this will stabilise the supply of crops.

=== Long term integrated value chain development projects ===
The long term integrated value chain development projects are:

- capacity building of FPOs - formation of new FPOs, subject to a maximum limit of 5% of the total eligible project cost.
- quality production - provision for quality input such as seeds, setting up of protected cultivation, mechanisation of farm practises and promoting contract farming.
- post-harvest processing facilities - providing appropriate transportation infrastructure from farm to facility, as well as primary and secondary processing.
- agri-logistics - allow for infrastructure to check for sudden spikes in prices, as well as providing the infrastructure of storage facilities for various regions.
- marketing and consumption points - the creation of e-markets and setting up of retail outlets and sorting, grading and packaging facilities.
- creation and management of an e-platform for managing the demand and supply of TOP crops.

The aim of these projects is to reduce the post-harvest losses through the development of infrastructure which can be used by farmers long-term. Farmers in production clusters will be organised into FPOs to manage production, post-harvest activities, value addition and marketing of TOP produce.

== Pattern of assistance ==
The project includes grants at 50% of eligible project costs in all areas and 70% for FPOs, however, it is capped at a maximum of Rs 50 crores per project.
