= Tamil Nadu Industrial Explosives Limited =

- Type: A Government of Tamil Nadu Undertaking
- Industry: Industrial Explosives & Its Accessories
- Founded: 09.02.1983
- Headquarters: Chennai-600002, christianpet, Vellore-632059, Tamil Nadu, India
- Area served: Tamil Nadu
- Key people: Thiru Kamaraj, I.A.S. (Chairman and Managing Director)

Tamil Nadu Industrial Explosives Limited (TEL) is a state-government undertaking of Government of Tamil Nadu located in the Indian state of Tamil Nadu. It is Industrial Explosives manufacturer.

The Industrial Explosives project is located in the Panamadangi Reserve Forest, Vandaranthangal / Dharapadavedu Villages, Katpadi, Vellore-59. Tamil Nadu Industrial Explosives Limited (TEL) Board is headed by a senior IAS officer.

The manufacturing facilities are house in 700 acres of Forest Land which is 7 km north of Katpadi Railway Station on the Vellore-Chittoor Highway.

== TEL Products ==
- Detators
- Detonating Fuse
- Emulsion Explosives
- Slurry Explosives
- MMAN Based Explosives
- 2EHN

== Major Clients ==
- Coal India and its subsidiaries (CIL)
- Singareni Collieries Co. Limited (SCCL)
- Neyveli Lignite Corporation Limited (NLC)
- Director General of Border Roads (DGBR)
- Electricity Boards (Hydro Electric Projects)
- Irrigation Projects
- Mineral Development Corporations.
- Railway Tunneling
- Oil and Natural Gas Commission (ONGC)
- State Public Works Departments.
- Cement Factories.
- Water Source Development and Quarrying

== Heads ==
- Mr. Chandrasekhar
- Mr. R P Sinha
- Mr. Sikandar Basha
- Mr. Murugan
