= Tamil Nadu Sugar Corporation Limited =

Tamil Nadu Sugar Corporation Limited (TASCO)
- Native name: தமிழ்நாடு சர்க்கரைக் கழகம் வரையறுக்கப்பட்டது
- Type: A Government of Tamil Nadu Undertaking
- Industry: Sugar, Molasses, Power
- Founded: 1974
- Headquarters: AAVIN Illam,3.A Pasumpon Muthuramalinganar Salai, Nandanam, Chennai - 600 035, Tamil Nadu, India
- Area served: Tamil Nadu

Tamil Nadu Sugar Corporation Limited (TASCO) (Tamil: தமிழ்நாடு சர்க்கரைக் கழகம் வரையறுக்கப்பட்டது) is an undertaking of the Government of Tamil Nadu located in the Indian state of Tamil Nadu. It is a producer of sugar, molasses and power.

== History ==
- Tamil Nadu Sugar Corporation Limited (TASCO) was incorporated on 1974 to take over and operate existing troubled sugar producers.

== TASCO Operation ==
Tamil Nadu Sugar Corporation Limited (TASCO) has two plants: Arignar Anna Sugar Mills and Madura Sugars (shut down).

=== Madura Sugars Mills ===
- Location - Pandiyarajapuaram, Madurai
- Status - Closed for long time due to low sugar cane receiving

=== Arignar Anna Sugar Mills ===
Subsidiary of Tamil Nadu Sugar Corporation Limited (TASCO)

- Location - Kurungulam Melpathy, Thanjavur Taluk, Thanjavur District
- Commencement - 1976 - 1977
- Capacity - 2500 Tons of Cane per Day (TCD)

=== Perambalur Sugar Mills ===
- Perambalur Sugar Mills is sugar mill of Perambalur Sugar Mills Limited, a Subsidiary of Tamil Nadu Sugar Corporation Limited (TASCO)
- Location - Eraiyur, Permbalur
- Commencement - 1975
- Capacity - 2500 TCD
