= Tamil Nadu Pollution Control Board =

Pollution governing body in India

- Company type: Government of Tamil Nadu
- Industry: Pollution Monitoring, Water, Air, Surface Pollution Monitor
- Founded: 1982
- Headquarters: Chennai, Tamil Nadu, India
- Area served: Tamil Nadu, India
- Key people: M. Jayanthi, IFS (Chairman)
- Website: www.tnpcb.gov.in

Tamil Nadu Pollution Control Board is the governing body to monitor and control air, noise, and water pollution in the state of Tamil Nadu.
