= Tamil Nadu Industrial Investment Corporation Limited =

Indian Financial Services company

- Headquarters: 692, Anna Salai, Nandanam, Chennai - 600035, Tamil Nadu, India
- Key people: Thiru Hans Raj Verma, IAS, Chairman and Managing Director of TIIC
- Owner: Government of Tamil Nadu
- Website: www.tiic.org

The Tamil Nadu Industrial Investment Corporation Limited (TIIC) (Tamil: தமிழ்நாடு தொழில் முதலீட்டுக் கழகம்), is an institution owned by the government of Tamil Nadu and is intended as a catalyst for the development of small, medium and large scale industries in Tamil Nadu. It was established in 1949.

== History ==
The Tamil Nadu Industrial Investment Corporation Limited (TIIC), is a government company incorporated under the Indian Companies Act 1913 and continues to be a government company under the Companies Act, 1956. The authorized share capital of the company is ₹300 crores and the paid-up capital of the company is ₹283.4956 crores

== Functions ==
TIIC as a State Level Financial Institution, offers long and medium-term financial assistance to various industries including the service sector in the following forms:

- Term Loans
- Term Loan and Working Capital Term Loans under the Single Window Scheme.
- Special types of assistance like Bill Financing Scheme, etc.
