= 2013 Rajya Sabha elections =

Elections for the upper house of Indian Parliament

- Entire 2013

13 seats to the Rajya Sabha (Note: Including 5 casual vacancies)
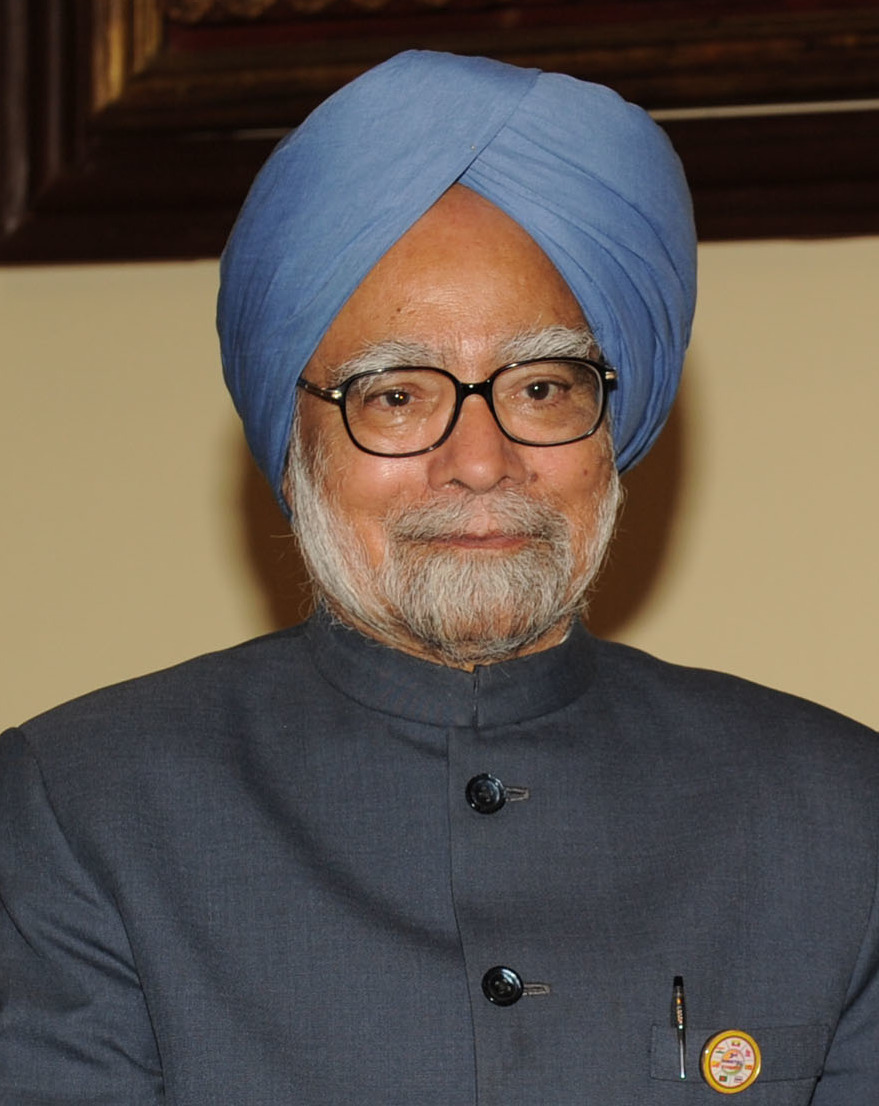

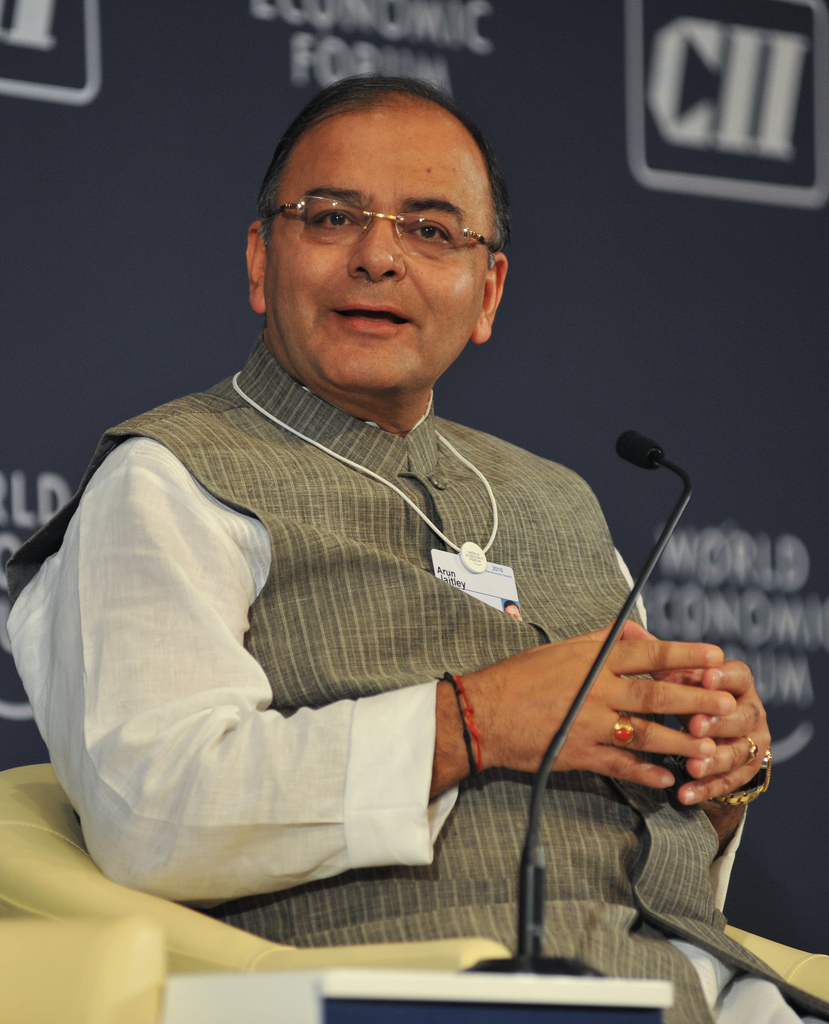
	First party	Second party
Leader	Dr. Manmohan Singh	Arun Jaitley
Party	INC	BJP
Alliance	UPA	NDA
Leader since	21 March 1998	3 June 2009
Leader's seat	Assam	Gujarat
Seats before	71	49
Seats after	72	49
Seat change	▲1	Steady

Minor Rajya Sabha elections were held in 2013, to elect members of the Rajya Sabha, Indian Parliament's upper chamber also known as the Council of States. Routine elections were held in May and June among proportionately qualifying legislators to elect (nominate) two members from Assam and six from Tamil Nadu, to the 245-member body.

By-elections were also held among legislators of the States of Bihar, Meghalaya, Karnataka, (one seat for each) and two in Uttar Pradesh.

== Elections ==
=== Assam ===
Seat No	Previous MP	Previous Party	Elected MP	Elected Party	Reference
1	Manmohan Singh	Indian National Congress	Manmohan Singh	Indian National Congress	
2	Kumar Deepak Das	Asom Gana Parishad	Santiuse Kujur	Indian National Congress	

=== Tamil Nadu ===
Seat No	Previous MP	Previous Party	Elected MP	Elected Party	Reference
1	A. Elavarasan	All India Anna Dravida Munnetra Kazhagam	R. Lakshmanan	All India Anna Dravida Munnetra Kazhagam	
2	V. Maitreyan	All India Anna Dravida Munnetra Kazhagam	V. Maitreyan	All India Anna Dravida Munnetra Kazhagam	
3	B. S. Gnanadesikan	Indian National Congress	T. Rathinavel	All India Anna Dravida Munnetra Kazhagam	
4	Tiruchi Siva	Dravida Munnetra Kazhagam	K. R. Arjunan	All India Anna Dravida Munnetra Kazhagam	
5	Kanimozhi	Dravida Munnetra Kazhagam	Kanimozhi	Dravida Munnetra Kazhagam	
6	D. Raja	Communist Party of India	D. Raja	Communist Party of India	

== Bye-elections ==
=== Bihar ===
- A bye election was announced to be held on 14 February, to fill the vacancy caused by resignation of Upendra Kushwaha from JD(U) representing Bihar. K. C. Tyagi of JDU won the election unopposed on 7 February to serve until 7 July 2016.

S.No	Former MP	Party	Date of Vacancy	Elected MP	Party	Date of appointment	Date of retirement
1	Upendra Kushwaha	Janata Dal (United)	2 December 2012	K. C. Tyagi	Janata Dal (United)	7 February 2013	7 July 2016

=== Meghalaya ===
- A bye election was announced to be held on 18 April, to fill the vacancy caused by resignation of Thomas A. Sangma from NCP representing Meghalaya. Wansuk Syiem of INC won the election unopposed on 11 April 2013 to serve until 12 April 2014

S.No	Former MP	Party	Date of Vacancy	Elected MP	Party	Date of appointment	Date of retirement
1	Thomas A. Sangma	Nationalist Congress Party	4 February 2013	Wansuk Syiem	Indian National Congress	11 April 2013	12 April 2014

=== Karnataka ===
- A bye election was announced to be held on 29 August, to fill the vacancy caused by resignation of Anil Lad from INC representing Karnataka. B. K. Hariprasad of INC won the election unopposed on 22 August 2013 to serve until 25 June 2014.

S.No	Former MP	Party	Date of Vacancy	Elected MP	Party	Date of appointment	Date of retirement
1	Anil Lad	Indian National Congress	20 May 2013	B. K. Hariprasad	Indian National Congress	22 August 2013	25 June 2014

=== Uttar Pradesh ===
- Two bye elections were announced to be held on 20 December, to fill the vacancies caused by death of Mohan Singh of SP and disqualification of Rasheed Masood of INC representing Uttar Pradesh. Kanak Lata Singh of SP and Pramod Tiwari of INC were elected unopposed on Dec 13, 2013 to serve until 4 July 2016 and 2 April 2018 respectively.

S.No	Former MP	Party	Date of Vacancy	Elected MP	Party	Date of appointment	Date of retirement
1	Mohan Singh	Samajwadi Party	22 September 2013	Kanak Lata Singh	Samajwadi Party	13 December 2013	4 July 2016
2	Rasheed Masood	Indian National Congress	1 October 2013	Pramod Tiwari	Indian National Congress	13 December 2013	2 April 2018
