= 2007 Rajya Sabha elections =

Elections for the upper house of Indian Parliament

(of 228 seats) to the Rajya Sabha
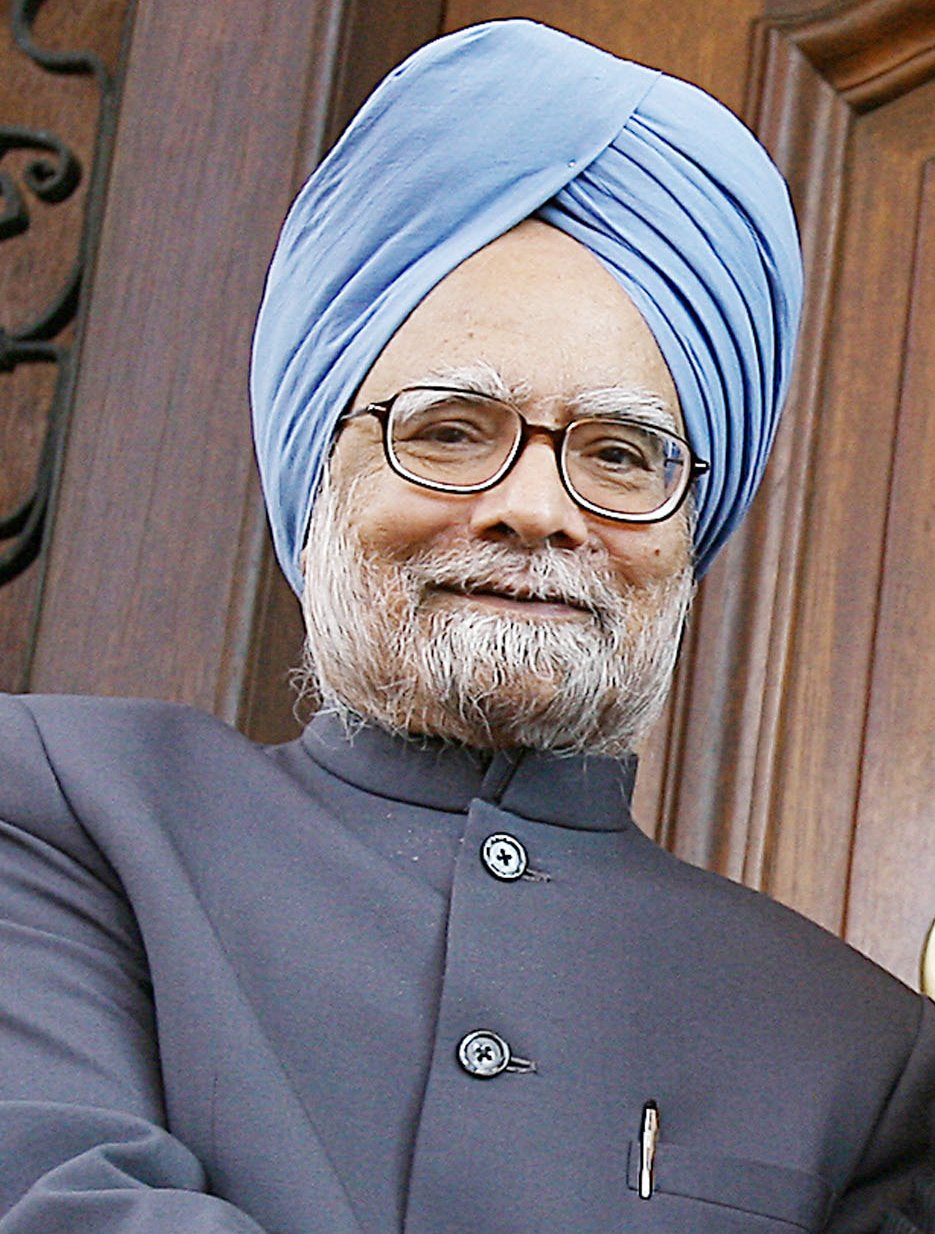

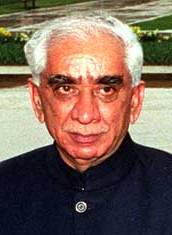
	First party	Second party
Leader	Manmohan Singh	Jaswant Singh
Party	INC	BJP

Rajya Sabha elections were held on various dates in 2007 to elect members of the Rajya Sabha—the upper chamber of Indian Parliament.

== Elections ==
Elections were held to elect members from various states.

=== Assam ===
Seat No	Previous MP	Previous Party	Elected MP	Elected Party	Reference
1	Manmohan Singh	Indian National Congress	Manmohan Singh	Indian National Congress	
2	Indramoni Bora	Bharatiya Janata Party	Kumar Deepak Das	Asom Gana Parishad	

=== Tamil Nadu ===
Seat No	Previous MP	Previous Party	Elected MP	Elected Party	Reference
1	R. Kamaraj	All India Anna Dravida Munnetra Kazhagam	A. Elavarasan	All India Anna Dravida Munnetra Kazhagam	
2	S. G. Indira	All India Anna Dravida Munnetra Kazhagam	V. Maitreyan	All India Anna Dravida Munnetra Kazhagam	
3	S. S. Chandran	All India Anna Dravida Munnetra Kazhagam	Kanimozhi	Dravida Munnetra Kazhagam	
4	P. G. Narayanan	All India Anna Dravida Munnetra Kazhagam	Tiruchi Siva	Dravida Munnetra Kazhagam	
5	B. S. Gnanadesikan	Tamil Maanila Congress (Moopanar)	B. S. Gnanadesikan	Indian National Congress	
6	K. P. K. Kumaran	Dravida Munnetra Kazhagam	D. Raja	Communist Party of India	

== Bye-elections ==
The following bye elections were held in the year 2007.

State - Member - Party

- Bye-elections were held on 29 March 2007 for vacancy from Punjab and Haryana due to deaths of seating member Sukhbuns Kaur Bhinder on 15/12/2006 with term ending on 09/04//2010 and seating member Sumitra Mahajan on 19/01/2007 with term ending on 09/04/2008
- West Bengal - Mohammed Amin - CPM ( ele 17/05/2007 term till 2011 ) (dea of Chittabrata Majumdar )
- Bye-elections were held on 4 October 2007 for vacancy from Uttar Pradesh due to resignation of seating member Mayawati on 05/07/2007 with term ending on 04/07/2010
