= R. Sakkarapani =

Indian politician

Cabinet Minister Government of Tamil Nadu
- In office 7 May 2021 – 5 May 2026
- Minister: Food and Civil Supplies
- Governor: Banwarilal Purohit; R. N. Ravi
- Chief Minister: M. K. Stalin
- Preceded by: R. Kamaraj

Member of the Tamil Nadu Legislative Assembly
- Incumbent
- Assumed office 10 May 1996
- Preceded by: N. P. Nataraj
- Constituency: Oddanchatram

Chief Government Whip of the Tamil Nadu Legislative Assembly
- In office 13 May 2006 – 15 May 2011
- Governor: Surjith Singh Barnala
- Chief Minister: M. Karunanidhi

Chief Whip of the Dravida Munnetra Kazhagam in Tamil Nadu Legislative Assembly
- In office 23 May 2011 – 21 May 2016

Personal details
- Party: Dravida Munnetra Kazhagam

R. Sakkarapani is an Indian politician, Minister of Tamil Nadu, and incumbent Member of the Legislative Assembly of Tamil Nadu who has been elected from Oddanchatram constituency for five consecutive periods and now as the sixth term. A member of the Dravida Munnetra Kazhagam (DMK) party, he won in 1996, 2001, 2006, 2011, 2016, 2021 and 2026 elections.

He was the Chief Government Whip of the Tamil Nadu Legislative Assembly from 2006 to 2011 and as a DMK Whip from the 2011 to 2016 Legislative assembly and also from the 2016 to 2021 assembly. He was appointed the Minister for Food and Civil Supplies of Tamil Nadu for the first time in Thiru M. K. Stalin's cabinet. He is one among the only 3 members who were consecutively elected to Tamil Nadu assembly from 1996 onwards for the sixth time consecutively, which record he holds along with his party counterparts M. K. Stalin and Duraimurugan.

== Birth ==
Sakkarapani was born in a village Kaaliyappagoundanpatti (Pungavalasu) near Kallimandayam.

== Elections contested ==
Elections	Constituency	Party	Result	Vote percentage	Opposition Candidate	Opposition Party	Opposition vote percentage
1996 Tamil Nadu state assembly election	Oddanchatram	DMK	Won	58.57	K Sellamuthu	AIADMK	26.08
2001 Tamil Nadu state assembly election	Oddanchatram	DMK	Won	46.4	A T Sellasamy	AIADMK	45.2
2006 Tamil Nadu state assembly election	Oddanchatram	DMK	Won	53.66	K P Nallasamy	AIADMK	36.93
2011 Tamil Nadu state assembly election	Oddanchatram	DMK	Won	51.99	P Baalasubramani	AIADMK	43.14
2016 Tamil Nadu state assembly election	Oddanchatram	DMK	Won	64.26	K Kittusamy	AIADMK	29.56
2021 Tamil Nadu state assembly election	Oddanchatram	DMK	Won	54.51	N P Nataraj	AIADMK	40.26
2026 Tamil Nadu state assembly election	Oddanchatram	DMK	Won	46.17	Vidiyal S. Sekar	TMC(M)	24.72

== Elections ==
Sakkarapani contested his first election in 1996 from the Oddanchatram constituency. He defeated K. Sellamuthu of ADMK by 36823. He contested his second election from the same constituency in 2001, irrespective of ADMK sweeping the state, Sakkarapani won the Constituency by 1369 votes. In 2006 again contested from the same Oddanchatram constituency and he won by a margin of 19903. He was selected as Tamil Nadu government whip and also for the ruling party DMK. In 2011, Sakkarapani won against huge anti-incumbency by 14933. In the 2016 election, Sakkarapani defeated the ADMK candidate Kittusamy by a margin of 65727. His winning margin is second highest in the state behind DMK supremo Karunanidhi.
