= Kanimozhi Rajathi Karunanidhi =

Indian politician (born 1968)

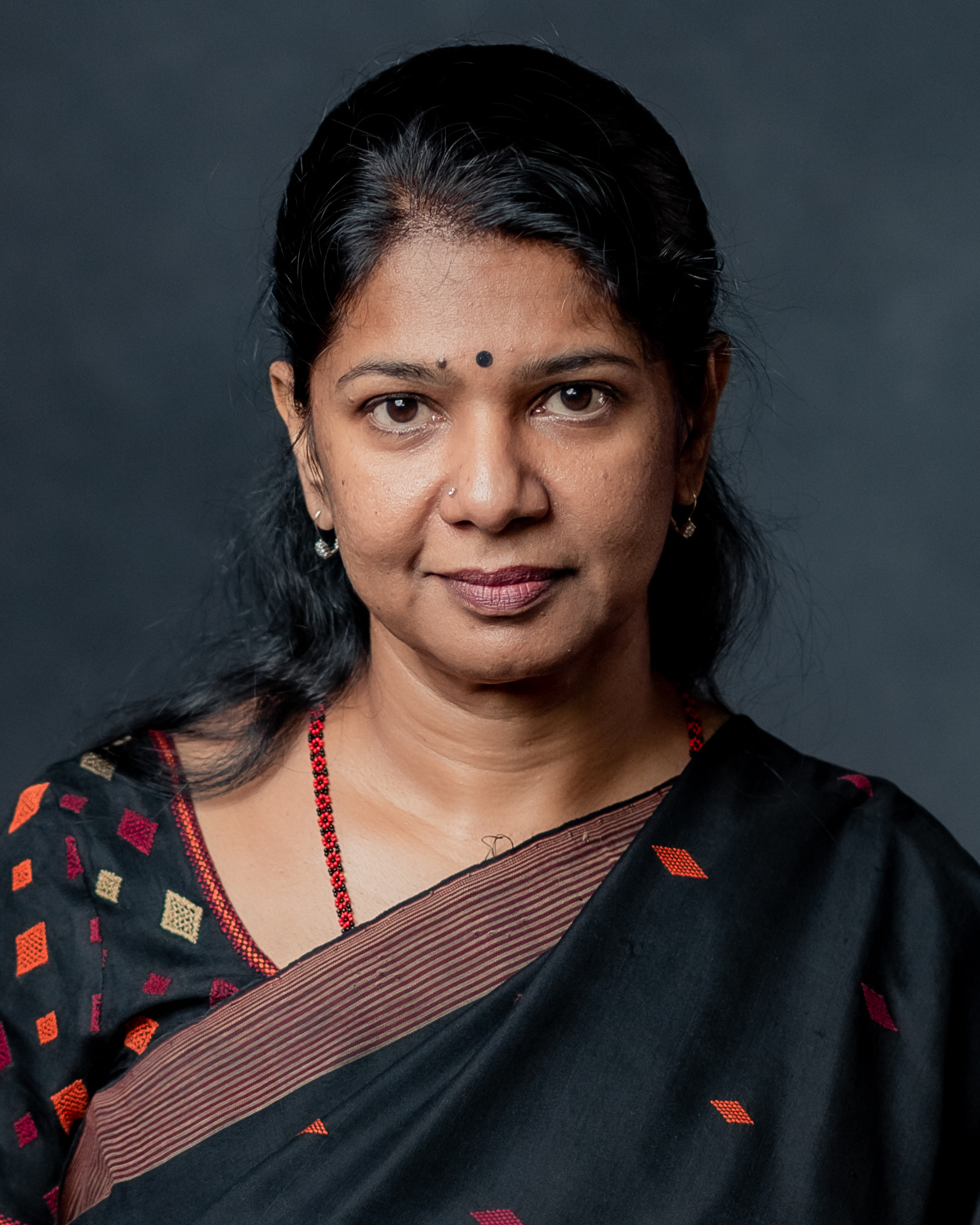
- Kanimozhi Rajathi Karunanidhi in 2020

Member of Parliament, Lok Sabha
- Incumbent
- Assumed office 18 June 2019
- Preceded by: J. Jayasingh Thiyagaraj Natterjee
- Constituency: Thoothukkudi

Member of Parliament, Rajya Sabha
- In office 25 July 2007 – 23 May 2019
- Prime Minister: Manmohan Singh; Narendra Modi
- Preceded by: S. G. Indira
- Succeeded by: P. Wilson
- Constituency: Tamil Nadu

Chairperson – Standing Committee on Rural Development and Panchayati Raj
- Incumbent
- Assumed office 13 September 2022
- Preceded by: Prataprao Jadhav

Chairperson – District Development Coordination and Monitoring Committee
- Incumbent
- Assumed office 18 June 2019
- Preceded by: J. Jayasingh Thiyagaraj Natterjee

Chairperson – Tuticorin Airport Advisory Committee
- Incumbent
- Assumed office 18 June 2019
- Preceded by: J. Jayasingh Thiyagaraj Natterjee

Chairperson – Standing Committee on Chemicals and Fertilizers
- In office 13 September 2019 – 12 September 2022
- Preceded by: Anandrao Adsul
- Succeeded by: Shashi Tharoor

President – The Hindu Office and National Press Employees’ Union
- Incumbent
- Assumed office 12 April 2017
- Preceded by: E. Gopal

Parliamentary Chairperson of the Dravida Munnetra Kazhagam
- Incumbent
- Assumed office 10 June 2024
- Preceded by: T. R. Baalu

Deputy Leader of the Dravida Munnetra Kazhagam in Lok Sabha
- In office 18 June 2019 – 5 June 2024
- Leader: T. R. Baalu
- Succeeded by: Dayanidhi Maran

Deputy General Secretary of the Dravida Munnetra Kazhagam
- Incumbent
- Assumed office 9 October 2022
- President: M. K. Stalin
- General Secretary: Duraimurugan
- Preceded by: Subbulakshmi Jagadeesan

Women's Wing Secretary of the Dravida Munnetra Kazhagam
- In office 9 January 2015 – 23 November 2022
- President: M. Karunanidhi; M. K. Stalin
- General Secretary: K. Anbazhagan; Durai Murugan
- Preceded by: Office Established
- Succeeded by: J. Helen Davidson

Personal details
- Born: Kanimozhi Rajathi Karunanidhi; 5 January 1968 (age 58) Madras, India
- Party: Dravida Munnetra Kazhagam
- Spouse: Athiban Bose (m. 1989; div. 1997); G. Aravinthan (m. 1997)
- Relations: See Karunanidhi family
- Children: Aditya Aravindan (Son)
- Parents: M. Karunanidhi (father); Rajathi Ammal (mother)
- Education: Master of Economics
- Alma mater: Ethiraj College for Women
- Profession: Politician; Poet; Journalist

Kanimozhi Rajathi Karunanidhi (born 5 January 1968) is an Indian politician, poet and journalist. She is a Member of Parliament, representing Thoothukkudi constituency in the Lok Sabha, the lower house of Parliament of India. She was also a former MP who represented Tamil Nadu in the Rajya Sabha (the upper house of India's Parliament). Kanimozhi is the daughter of the former Chief Minister of Tamil Nadu M. Karunanidhi for his third wife Rajathi Ammal.

Kanimozhi belongs to the Indian political party Dravida Munnetra Kazhagam (DMK), where she functions as the deputy general secretary. Her half-brothers M. K. Alagiri and M. K. Stalin are the former Minister of Chemicals and Fertilizers of the Republic of India and the Chief Minister of Tamil Nadu respectively.

== Early life ==
Kanimozhi was born in Chennai to M. Karunanidhi, the former Chief Minister of Tamil Nadu, and Rajathi Ammal. She was a student of Presentation Convent, Church Park, in Chennai, and later completed her master's degree in economics from Ethiraj College for Women, Chennai.

Before her entry into politics, Kanimozhi was involved in journalism, such as subeditor for The Hindu, editor in charge of Kungumam (a Tamil weekly magazine), and a features editor for a Singapore-based Tamil newspaper called Tamil Murasu.

== Social works ==
=== Interests ===
Kanimozhi has been known to support pan-Tamil issues. She takes part in organising women empowerment programs and is interested in the welfare of disabled people and transgender people. In 2005, with Karthi Chidambaram, she founded a portal supporting free speech.

=== Chennai Sangamam ===
In 2007, Kanimozhi conceived the idea of the Chennai Sangamam, an annual open Tamil cultural festival, usually held during the Pongal season.

=== Job fairs ===
She spearheads DMK efforts to organise job fairs, under the banner 'Kalaignar 85' across rural Tamil Nadu to facilitate employment opportunities for young people in smaller cities, towns and villages. She plans to conduct similar fairs all over Tamil Nadu.

== Literary works ==
- Sigarangalil Uraikiradhu Kaalam
- Agathinai
- Paarvaigal
- Karukkum Marudhaani
- Karuvarai Vaasanai

Her literary works were translated into English, Malayalam, Telugu and Kannada.

=== Silappathikaram ===
Kanimozhi has worked on a production titled Silappadikaram, A woman of Substance based on a Tamil epic of the same name with Bombay Jayashri.

== Personal life ==
Kanimozhi has been married twice; firstly in 1989 to Athiban Bose, a businessman from Sivakasi (since divorced), and then to G. Aravindan, a Singapore-based Tamil writer, in 1997. She has a son named Aditya Aravindan.

== Political career ==
=== As a Rajya Sabha MP ===
In May 2007, the DMK nominated Kanimozhi as one of the party's candidates for the Rajya Sabha. She became a Rajya Sabha member for the second time in 2013. Kanimozhi was the chief whip of the DMK in the house and was the leader of DMK in the Upper house.

=== As a Lok Sabha MP ===
She was elected from Thoothukkudi as the first female MP of that constituency for the 17th Lok Sabha, which was held in the year 2019, and was elected as the DMK's deputy leader of the Lok Sabha. As of September 2019 and September 2022, Kanimozhi works as the chairperson of the Parliament Standing Committee on Chemicals and Fertilizers and Rural Development and Panchayati Raj, respectively.

=== As a trade union leader ===
She is the president of The Hindu National Press employees union. She is the first woman to be elected to that post.

=== Women's Wing Secretary of the DMK ===
She was the women's wing secretary of the DMK party and encourages women to enter politics. She has organised training camps for the district-level office-bearers of the women's wing. She also organised a rally in Delhi, demanding that the women's reservation bill be passed by the parliament.

=== Deputy General Secretary of the DMK ===
On 9 October 2022, the chief minister of Tamil Nadu and the DMK president M. K. Stalin, announced and appointed Kanimozhi as the deputy general secretary of the DMK party in the presence of the party's general secretary Duraimurugan at the general council meeting held in Chennai.

Following the Operation Sindoor, She led an all-party delegation to Russia, reiterated Prime Minister Narendra Modi's assertion that India would make no distinction between terrorists and their sponsors should the nation face further attacks.

== Controversies ==
=== 2G spectrum scam ===
As per the chargesheet filed by CBI, Kanimozhi has 20% stake in her family owned Kalaignar TV, her step-mother Dayalu Ammal owns 60% stake in the same channel. CBI alleged that Kanimozhi was an "active brain" behind the channel's operations and she worked along with former telecom minister A. Raja to get DB Realty promoter Shahid Balwa to circuitously route 2 billion (US$36.2 million) to Kalaignar TV. According to CBI, Kanimozhi was in regular touch with A. Raja regarding launching of Kalaignar TV channel and its other pending works. A. Kanimozhi had spent 190 days in Tihar Jail in 2011 after the CBI named her an "active brain" behind the functioning and setting up of Kalaignar TV. Raja was further pursuing the cause of Kalaignar TV not only for getting registration of the company from Ministry of Information and Broadcasting but also for getting it in the DTH operator TATA Sky's bouquet. She was also summoned by the Income Tax Department, Chennai for alleged tax evasion charges.

On 3 July 2012, briefing the joint parliamentary committee probing the scam, ED claimed that it has enough evidence to convict DMK chief Karunanidhi's wife and daughter Kanimozhi.

Kanimozhi has defended herself by arguing that she is only a 20% shareholder in the company, who has no involvement in the financial aspects or the liability of a director.

During the course of the trial, Kanimozhi's name was cleared by at least one witness who deposed that she had no involvement in the day-to-day affairs of Kalaignar TV and that she was initially reluctant to join the management of the channel. It was also admitted in court that Kanimozhi resigned from Kalaignar board after only two weeks to become a Member of Parliament. In an extraordinary twist, on 21 December 2017 a special CBI court acquitted her along with 19 others accused including A. Raja in 2G spectrum allocation cases. The Court said that the prosecution had failed to prove any of its charge. Thus all accused were acquitted.

== Positions in Parliament of the Republic of India ==
Elections	Position	Constituency	Term in office		
Elections	Position	Constituency	Assumed office	Left office	Time in office
2007	Member of Parliament, Rajya Sabha	Tamil Nadu	25 July 2007	29 May 2019	11 years, 308 days
2019	Member of Parliament, Lok Sabha	Thoothukkudi	18 June 2019	5 June 2024	4 years, 353 days
2024	Member of Parliament, Lok Sabha	Thoothukkudi	25 June 2024	Incumbent	2 years, 150 days

== Electoral performance ==
Kanimozhi has been elected as M.P. of Lok Sabha from Thoothukkudi constituency. This was her first direct electoral performance. She resigned her Rajya Sabha MP post on 29 May 2019 after being elected to 17th Lok Sabha.

Elections	Constituency	Party	Result	Vote %	Opposition		
Elections	Constituency	Party	Result	Vote %	Candidate	Party	Vote %
2019 Indian general election	Thoothukkudi	DMK	Won	56.77	Tamilisai Soundararajan	BJP	21.77
2024 Indian general election	Thoothukkudi	DMK	Won	55.26	R. Sivasamy Velumani	AIADMK	15.12

Lok Sabha
Preceded by J. Jayasingh Thiyagaraj Natterjee	Member of Parliament from Thoothukkudi; 18 June 2019	Incumbent
Rajya Sabha
Preceded by S. G. Indira	Member of Parliament from Tamil Nadu; 25 July 2007 – 23 May 2019	Succeeded by P. Wilson
Party political offices
Preceded by Subbulakshmi Jagadeesan	Deputy General Secretary of the Dravida Munnetra Kazhagam; 9 October 2022	Incumbent
Preceded by Office established	Women's Wing Secretary of the Dravida Munnetra Kazhagam; 9 January 2015 – 23 November 2022	Succeeded by J. Helen Davidson
