= Thoothukkudi Lok Sabha constituency =

Constituency of the Indian parliament in Tamil Nadu

Coordinates: 8.78°N 78.1°E

Thoothukkudi
- Lok Sabha constituency
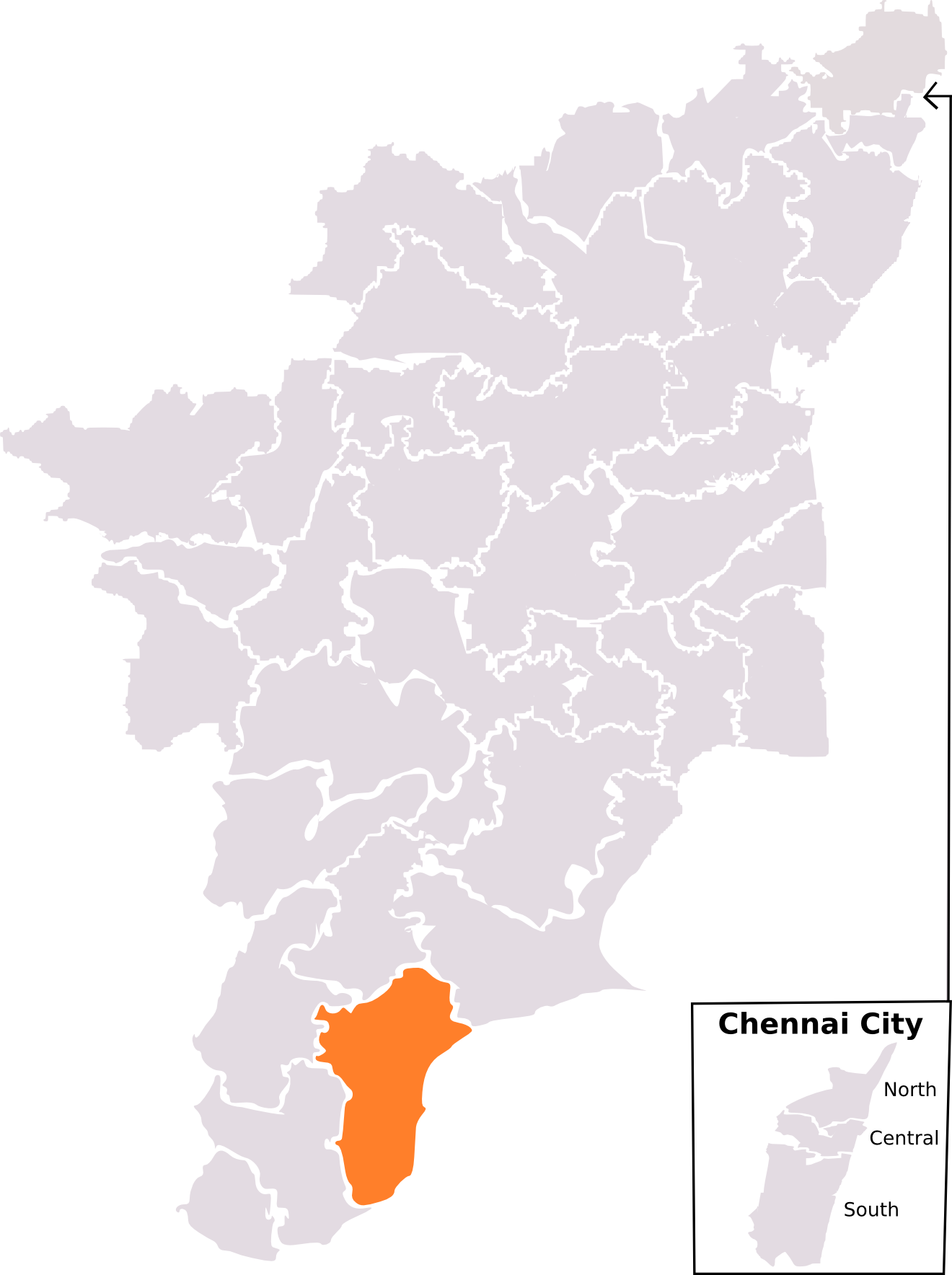
- Map Outlining Thoothukkudi Lok Sabha Constituency

Constituency details
- Country: India
- Region: South India
- State: Tamil Nadu
- Assembly constituencies: Vilathikulam; Thoothukkudi; Tiruchendur; Srivaikuntam; Ottapidaram; Kovilpatti
- Established: 2009
- Total electors: 1,376,624
- Reservation: None

Member of Parliament
- 18th Lok Sabha
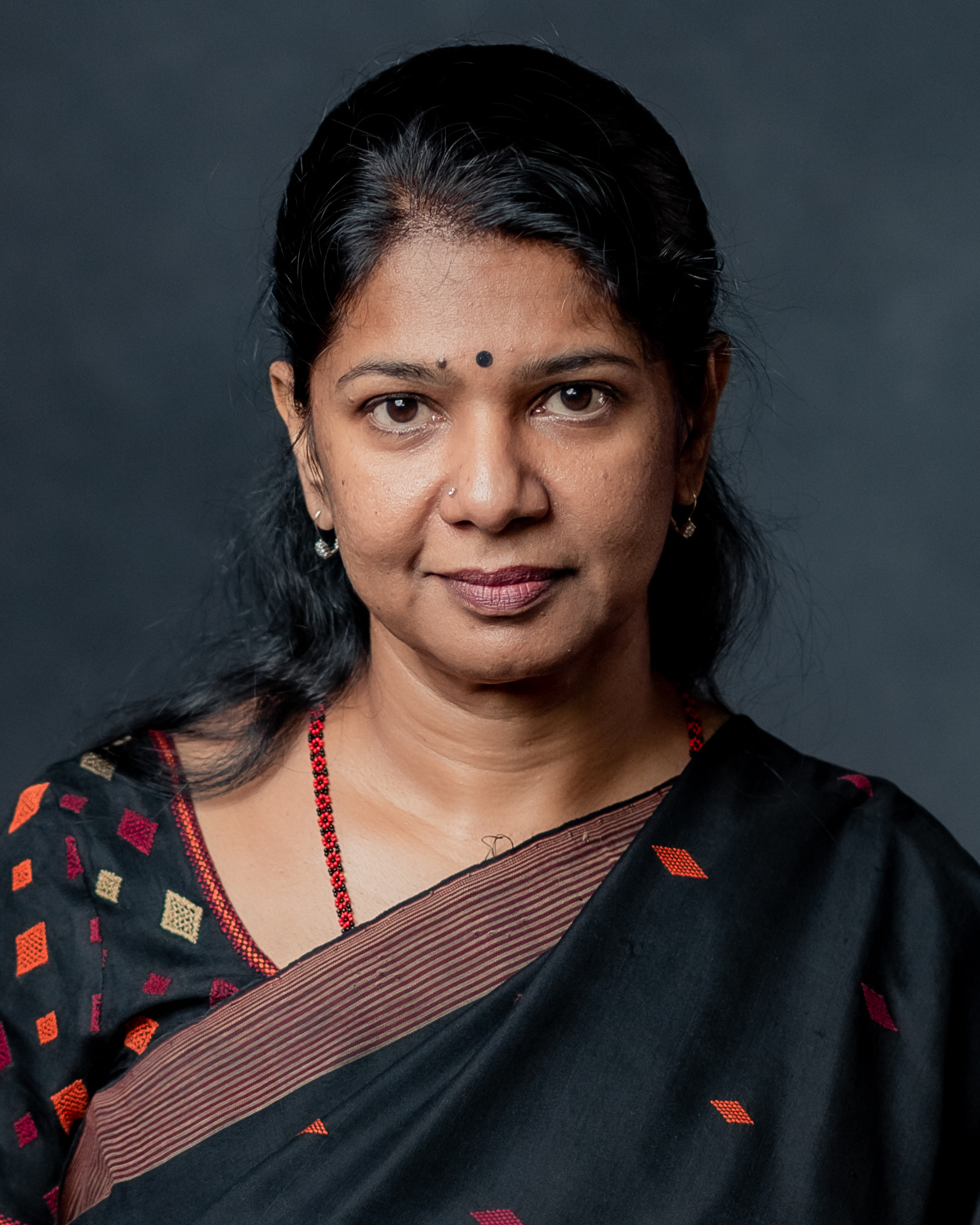
- Incumbent Kanimozhi Rajathi Karunanidhi
- Party: DMK
- Alliance: None
- Elected year: 2024
- Preceded by: J. Jayasingh Thiyagaraj Natterjee (AIADMK)

The Thoothukkudi Lok Sabha constituency is one of the 39 Lok Sabha (parliamentary) constituencies in Tamil Nadu, a state in India. This constituency encompasses the entirety of Thoothukkudi district and plays a significant role as a coastal and industrial region within Tamil Nadu. It was established in 2009 following the delimitation outlined in the Parliamentary and Assembly Constituency Order of 2008.

Most successful parties from Thoothukkudi Lok Sabha constituency
1. DMK (3 times) (75.0%)
2. AIADMK (1 time) (25.0%)

== Assembly segments ==
Thoothukkudi Lok Sabha constituency comprises the following legislative assembly segments:

No.	Name	Reserved for	District	Elected member	Party	2024 Lead
213	Vilathikulam	General	Thoothukkudi	G. V. Markandayan	DMK	DMK
214	Thoothukkudi	General	Thoothukkudi	A. Srinath	TVK	DMK
215	Tiruchendur	General	Thoothukkudi	Anitha R. Radhakrishnan	DMK	DMK
216	Srivaikuntam	General	Thoothukkudi	G. Saravanan	TVK	DMK
217	Ottapidaram	SC	Thoothukkudi	P. Mathan Raja	TVK	DMK
218	Kovilpatti	General	Thoothukkudi	K. Karunanithi	DMK	DMK

== List of members of parliament ==
No.	Name	Term of office		Lok Sabha (Election)	Political party
No.	Name	Assumed office	Left office	Lok Sabha (Election)	Political party
1	S. R. Jeyadurai	1 June 2009	18 May 2014	15th (2009)	Dravida Munnetra Kazhagam
2	J. Jayasingh Thiyagaraj Natterjee	4 June 2014	24 May 2019	16th (2014)	All India Anna Dravida Munnetra Kazhagam
3	Kanimozhi Rajathi Karunanidhi	18 June 2019	5 June 2024	17th (2019)	Dravida Munnetra Kazhagam
3	Kanimozhi Rajathi Karunanidhi	25 June 2024	Incumbent	18th (2024)	Dravida Munnetra Kazhagam

== Election results ==
Vote share of winning candidates
2024	55.26%
2019	56.77%
2014	39.92%
2009	47.40%

=== General election 2024 ===
2024 Indian general election: Thoothukkudi
Party	Candidate	Votes	%	±%
DMK	Kanimozhi Rajathi Karunanidhi	540,729	55.26	▼1.51
AIADMK	R. Sivasamy Velumani	147,991	15.12	New
TMC(M)	S. D. R. Vijayaseelan	122,380	12.51	New
NTK	J. Rowena Ruth Jane	120,300	12.29	▲7.33
NOTA	None of the above	9,806	1.00	▲0.07
Majority		392,738	40.14	▲5.14
Turnout		975,468	66.88	▼2.55
DMK hold		Swing	▼1.51	

=== General election 2019 ===
2019 Indian general election: Thoothukkudi
Party	Candidate	Votes	%	±%
DMK	Kanimozhi Rajathi Karunanidhi	563,143	56.77	▲30.37
BJP	Tamilisai Soundararajan	215,934	21.77	New
AMMK	M. Bhuvaneswaran	76,866	7.75	New
NTK	S. Christantine Rajasekar	49,222	4.96	New
MNM	T. P. S. Pon Kumaran	25,702	2.59	New
NOTA	None of the above	9,234	0.93	▼0.32
Majority		347,209	35.00	▲21.48
Turnout		991,263	69.43	▼0.53
DMK gain from AIADMK		Swing	▲30.37	

=== General election 2014 ===
2014 Indian general election: Thoothukkudi
Party	Candidate	Votes	%	±%
AIADMK	J. Jayasingh Thiyagaraj Natterjee	366,052	39.92	▲4.21
DMK	P. Jegan	242,050	26.40	▼21.00
MDMK	S. Joel	182,191	19.87	New
INC	A. P. C. V. Shanmugam	63,080	6.88	New
AAP	M. Pushparayan	26,476	2.89	New
CPI	A. Mohanraj	14,993	1.64	New
NOTA	None of the above	11,447	1.25	New
Majority		124,002	13.52	▲1.84
Turnout		916,778	69.96	▲0.83
AIADMK gain from DMK		Swing	▲4.21	

=== General election 2009 ===
2009 Indian general election: Thoothukkudi
Party	Candidate	Votes	%	±%
DMK	S. R. Jeyadurai	311,017	47.40	New
AIADMK	Cynthia Pandian	234,368	35.72	New
DMDK	M. S. Sunther	61,403	9.36	New
BJP	S. Saravanan	27,013	4.12	New
BSP	E. Pa. Jeevankumar	6,737	1.03	New
Majority		76,649	11.68	New
Turnout		656,163	69.13	New
DMK win (new seat)				

== See also ==
- Lok Sabha
- Parliament of India
- Thoothukkudi district
- List of constituencies of the Lok Sabha
