= S. P. Shunmuganathan =

Indian politician

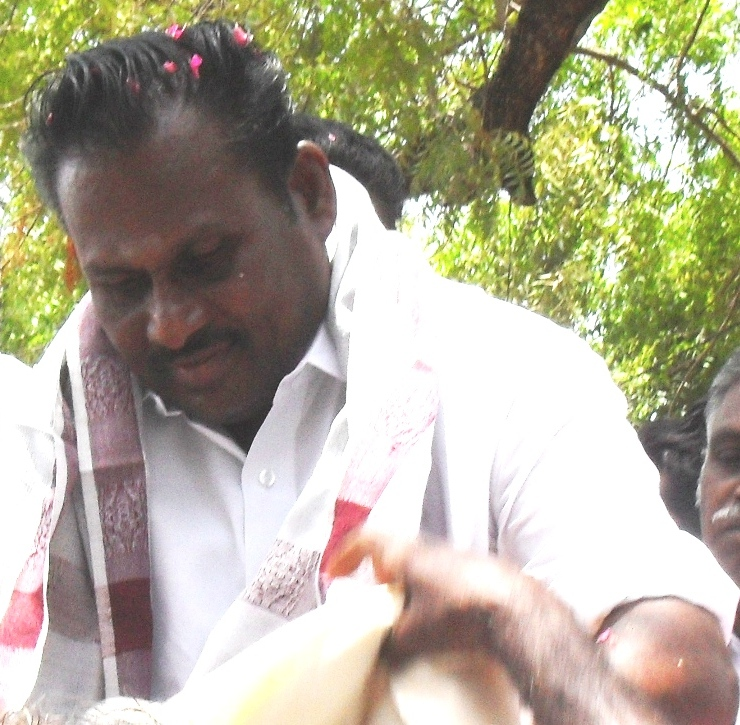
- S. P. Shunmuganathan in Sundankottai

Member of Tamil Nadu Legislative Assembly
- In office 23 May 2011 – 2 May 2021
- Chief Minister: J. Jayalalithaa; O. Panneerselvam; J. Jayalalithaa; O. Panneerselvam; Edappadi K. Palaniswami
- Preceded by: M. B. Sudalaiyandi
- Succeeded by: Oorvasi. R
- Constituency: Srivaikuntam
- In office 22 May 2001 – 12 May 2006
- Chief Minister: J. Jayalalithaa; O. Panneerselvam; J. Jayalalithaa
- Preceded by: S. David Selvyn
- Succeeded by: D. Selvaraj
- Constituency: Srivaikuntam

Minister for Milk and Dairy Development
- In office 23 May 2016 – 29 August 2016

Minister for Tourism and Tourism development
- In office 18 June 2013 – 21 May 2016

Minister for Hindu Religious and Charitable Endowments
- In office 16 May 2011 – 3 November 2011

Minister for Handlooms and Textiles
- In office 14 May 2001 – 1 March 2002

Organization Secretary of Thoothukudi South District
- Incumbent
- Assumed office 2 March 2019
- Leader: Edappadi K. Palaniswami

Personal details
- Born: 9 September 1954 (age 72) Pandaravilai, Madras State, India (present-day Tamil Nadu)
- Party: All India Anna Dravida Munnetra Kazhagam
- Spouse: Asha
- Children: 6
- Occupation: Agriculture

S. Ponnaiah Shunmuganathan (born 9 September 1954) is an Indian politician and former member of the Tamil Nadu Legislative Assembly from Srivaikuntam constituency. He is the former Minister for Milk and Dairy Development.

== Family and early life ==
S. P. Shunmuganathan was born on 9 September 1954 in Pandaravailai in Thoothukudi district of Tamil Nadu. His father, Ponnaiah Nadar was a Payilvan (Gym master) and Teacher. Shunmuganathan finished his Siddha degree in Kumbakonam. His wife is Asha, and they have five daughters and a son.

== Political career ==
He joined All India Anna Dravida Munnetra Kazhagam (AIADMK) in 1972. He served as the unopposed Panchayat secretary of Perungulam, Perungulam town secretary, Srivaikuntam union secretary, Presently he is the AIADMK's secretary of south Thoothukudi District. In 2001 election he was selected as MLA of Srivaikuntam constituency.

In 2006 Tamil Nadu assembly elections, he lost to D. Selvaraj of Indian National Congress by 1,632 votes in the Srivaikuntam constituency. In 2011 Tamil Nadu assembly election he was elected from the Srivaikundam constituency and served as a minister for Hindu religious and charitable endowments in J. Jayalalithaa's cabinet. He was sacked as Minister for Rural Industries in November 2011 as part of the third cabinet reshuffle in a five-month period by Jayalalithaa.

In June 2013 he was appointed minister of Tourism and Tourism development.

In 2016 Assembly elections Shunmuganathan won in Srivaikuntam Constituency against Indian National Congress candidate Rani Venkatesan. After that he became minister of Milk and Dairy Development under J. Jayalalithaa's sixth term. He was released from cabinet on 29 August 2016.
