= Oorvasi S. Amirtharaj =

Indian politician

Member of the Tamil Nadu Legislative Assembly
- In office 12 May 2021 – 4 May 2026
- Preceded by: S. P. Shunmuganathan
- Succeeded by: G.Saravanan
- Constituency: Srivaikuntam

Personal details
- Party: Indian National Congress
- Parent: Oorvasi D. Selvaraj (father)

Oorvasi S. Amirtharaj is an Indian politician who is a Member of Legislative Assembly of Tamil Nadu. He was elected from Srivaikuntam as an Indian National Congress candidate in 2021.

== Electoral performance ==
2021 Tamil Nadu Legislative Assembly election: Srivaikuntam
Party	Candidate	Votes	%	±%
INC	Oorvasi S. Amirtharaj	76,843	46.75%	+7.05
AIADMK	S. P. Shunmuganathan	59,471	36.18%	−5.79
NTK	P. Subbiah Pandian	12,706	7.73%	+6.37
AMMK	Eral S. Ramesh	10,203	6.21%	New
MNM	R. Chandra Sekar	1,355	0.82%	New
Margin of victory		17,372	10.57%	8.30%
Turnout		164,386	73.26%	−1.62%
Rejected ballots		123	0.07%	
Registered electors		224,384		
INC gain from AIADMK		Swing	4.78%	
