= M. Sudhakar (politician) =

Indian politician (born 1974)

Dr. M. Sudhakar

Member of the Tamil Nadu Legislative Assembly
- Incumbent
- Assumed office 11 May 2026
- Preceded by: Duraimurugan
- Constituency: Katpadi

Personal details
- Party: Tamilaga Vettri Kazhagam

Manogaran Sudhakar (born 1974) is an Indian physician and politician from Tamil Nadu. He is a member of the Tamil Nadu Legislative Assembly from Katpadi Assembly constituency in Vellore district representing Tamilaga Vettri Kazhagam.

Sudhakar is from Katpadi, Vellore district, Tamil Nadu. He is the son of Manogaran. He completed his M.B.B.S. at Bangalore University in 1999 and later did his specialisation in Diabetology at Vuk Vrhovac University Clinic for Diabetes, Endocrinology and Metabolic Diseases, Zagreb, Croatia, in 2004. he declared assets worth Rs.7 crore in his affidavit to the Election Commission of India.

== Career ==
Sudhakar became an MLA for the first time winning the 2026 Tamil Nadu Legislative Assembly election from Katpadi Assembly constituency representing Tamilaga Vettri Kazhagam. He polled 69,868 votes and defeated his nearest opponent, V. Ramu of the All India Anna Dravida Munnetra Kazhagam, by a margin of 5,870 votes.
