= G. Saravanan =

Indian politician

Member of the Tamil Nadu Legislative Assembly
- Incumbent
- Assumed office 2026
- Preceded by: Oorvasi S. Amirtharaj
- Constituency: Srivaikuntam

Personal details
- Party: Tamilaga Vettri Kazhagam
- Profession: Politician

G. Saravanan is an Indian politician from Tamil Nadu. He is a member of the Tamil Nadu Legislative Assembly from Srivaikuntam representing Tamilaga Vettri Kazhagam.

== Political career ==
Saravanan won the Srivaikuntam seat in the 2026 Tamil Nadu Legislative Assembly election as a candidate of Tamilaga Vettri Kazhagam. He received 58,814 votes and defeated S. P. Shunmuganathan of the Anna Dravida Munnetra Kazhagam by a margin of 1,186 votes.
