= Srivaikuntam Assembly constituency =

One of the 234 State Legislative Assembly Constituencies in Tamil Nadu

Coordinates: 8.63°N 77.91°E

Srivaikuntam
- Constituency No. 216 for the Tamil Nadu Legislative Assembly
- Area of Srivaikuntam Assembly constituency

Constituency details
- Country: India
- Region: South India
- State: Tamil Nadu
- District: Thoothukkudi
- Lok Sabha constituency: Thoothukkudi
- Established: 1957
- Total electors: 214,268
- Reservation: None

Member of Legislative Assembly
- 17th Tamil Nadu Legislative Assembly
- Incumbent G. Saravanan
- Party: TVK
- Elected year: 2026
- Preceded by: Oorvasi S. Amirtharaj

Srivaikuntam State Assembly constituency (Tamil: ஸ்ரீவைகுண்டம் சட்டமன்றத் தொகுதி) is one of the 234 state legislative assembly constituencies in Tamil Nadu in southern India. It is also one of the six state legislative assembly constituencies included in Thoothukkudi Lok Sabha constituency. It is one of the oldest assembly segments in Tamil Nadu, being in existence since 1957 election.

== Members of Legislative Assembly ==
Year	Winner	Party
1957	A. P. C. Veerabahu	Indian National Congress
1962	A. P. C. Veerabahu	Indian National Congress
1967	Si. Pa. Aditanar	Dravida Munnetra Kazhagam
1971	Si. Pa. Aditanar	Dravida Munnetra Kazhagam
1977	K. Sathu Selvaraj	All India Anna Dravida Munnetra Kazhagam
1980	E. Ramasubramanian	All India Anna Dravida Munnetra Kazhagam
1984	S. Daniel Raj	Indian National Congress
1989	S. Daniel Raj	Indian National Congress
1991	S. Daniel Raj	Indian National Congress
1996	S. David Selvyn	Dravida Munnetra Kazhagam
2001	S. P. Shunmuganathan	All India Anna Dravida Munnetra Kazhagam
2006	D. Selvaraj	Indian National Congress
2009	M. B. Sudalaiyandi	Indian National Congress
2011	S. P. Shunmuganathan	All India Anna Dravida Munnetra Kazhagam
2016	S. P. Shunmuganathan	All India Anna Dravida Munnetra Kazhagam
2021	Oorvasi S. Amirtharaj	Indian National Congress
2026	V. G. Saravanan	Tamilaga Vettri Kazhagam

== Election results ==
Vote share of winning candidates
2026	33.34%
2021	46.75%
2016	41.96%
2011	52.86%
2009	63.70%
2006	40.72%
2001	46.58%
1996	42.57%
1991	62.54%
1989	34.12%
1984	53.76%
1980	38.99%
1977	31.29%
1971	54.95%
1967	62.57%
1962	48.28%
1957	61.06%

=== 2026 ===
2026 Tamil Nadu Legislative Assembly election: Srivaikuntam
Party	Candidate	Votes	%	±%
TVK	G. Saravanan	58,814	33.34	New
AIADMK	Shanmuganathan S P	57,628	32.67	▼3.51
INC	Oorvasi Amirtharaj S	41,277	23.4	▼23.35
NTK	Shunmugasundaram S	13,153	7.46	▼0.27
AIFB	Muthuramalingam S	2,347	1.33	New
PT	Rajasuthan N	1,015	0.58	New
NOTA	NOTA	579	0.33	
Margin of victory		1,186		
Turnout		1,76,421		
Rejected ballots				
Registered electors		212,885		
TVK gain from INC		Swing		

=== 2021 ===
2021 Tamil Nadu Legislative Assembly election: Srivaikuntam
Party	Candidate	Votes	%	±%
INC	Oorvasi S. Amirtharaj	76,843	46.75%	+7.05
AIADMK	S. P. Shunmuganathan	59,471	36.18%	−5.79
NTK	P. Subbiah Pandian	12,706	7.73%	+6.37
AMMK	Eral S. Ramesh	10,203	6.21%	New
MNM	R. Chandra Sekar	1,355	0.82%	New
Margin of victory		17,372	10.57%	8.30%
Turnout		164,386	73.26%	−1.62%
Rejected ballots		123	0.07%	
Registered electors		224,384		
INC gain from AIADMK		Swing	4.78%	

=== 2016 ===
2016 Tamil Nadu Legislative Assembly election: Srivaikuntam
Party	Candidate	Votes	%	±%
AIADMK	S. P. Shunmuganathan	65,198	41.96%	−10.89
INC	Rani Venkatesan	61,667	39.69%	+2.85
BJP	S. Selvaraj	9,582	6.17%	+3.04
TMC(M)	S. D. R. Vijayaseelan	6,203	3.99%	New
AIFB	S. Muthuramalingam	3,764	2.42%	New
NTK	P. Subbiah Pandian	2,113	1.36%	New
NOTA	NOTA	1,457	0.94%	New
Independent	U. Chithiraipandi	810	0.52%	New
PMK	G. Lingaraj	806	0.52%	New
Margin of victory		3,531	2.27%	−13.74%
Turnout		155,366	74.89%	−0.14%
Registered electors		207,471		
AIADMK hold		Swing	-10.89%	

=== 2011 ===
2011 Tamil Nadu Legislative Assembly election: Srivaikuntam
Party	Candidate	Votes	%	±%
AIADMK	S. P. Shunmuganathan	69,708	52.86%	+13.82
INC	M. B. Sudalaiyandi	48,586	36.84%	−3.94
JMM	S. Sudalaimani	6,033	4.57%	New
BJP	S. Selvaraj	4,125	3.13%	+0.22
AIMF	H. M. Mohammed Yusuf	1,303	0.99%	New
Independent	N. Saravanan	1,255	0.95%	New
APM	K. Chinnadurai	869	0.66%	New
Margin of victory		21,122	16.02%	14.27%
Turnout		131,879	75.03%	8.45%
Registered electors		175,769		
AIADMK gain from INC		Swing	12.08%	

=== 2006 ===
2006 Tamil Nadu Legislative Assembly election: Srivaikuntam
Party	Candidate	Votes	%	±%
INC	D. Selvaraj	38,188	40.78%	New
AIADMK	S. P. Shunmuganathan	36,556	39.04%	−7.54
PT	E. Athisaya Kumar	9,324	9.96%	New
DMDK	C. Sathiya Seelan	3,166	3.38%	New
BJP	P. M. Paulraj	2,719	2.90%	New
AIFB	S. Frederick Stanley	2,136	2.28%	New
Independent	E. George Benni	719	0.77%	New
Margin of victory		1,632	1.74%	−1.64%
Turnout		93,643	66.58%	13.59%
Registered electors		140,639		
INC gain from AIADMK		Swing	-5.80%	

=== 2001 ===
2001 Tamil Nadu Legislative Assembly election: Srivaikuntam
Party	Candidate	Votes	%	±%
AIADMK	S. P. Shunmuganathan	39,739	46.58%	New
DMK	S. David Selvyn	36,853	43.19%	+0.62
MDMK	P. Selvam	6,184	7.25%	New
Independent	R. Jayapal	987	1.16%	New
SP	J. Rajan	831	0.97%	New
Independent	B. Rajaendran	727	0.85%	New
Margin of victory		2,886	3.38%	−11.85%
Turnout		85,321	53.00%	−8.50%
Registered electors		161,095		
AIADMK gain from DMK		Swing	4.01%	

=== 1996 ===
1996 Tamil Nadu Legislative Assembly election: Srivaikuntam
Party	Candidate	Votes	%	±%
DMK	S. David Selvyn	36,917	42.57%	+13.66
INC	S. Daniel Raj	23,708	27.34%	−35.2
CPI(M)	P. Sampath @ Thirugnana Sambantham	11,539	13.31%	New
JP	S. Chellappa	7,743	8.93%	New
BJP	S. P. Vel	3,305	3.81%	−2.89
AIIC(T)	V. Manoharaj	1,390	1.60%	New
Independent	S. Chandrasekar	1,157	1.33%	New
Independent	T. Viswanathan	494	0.57%	New
Margin of victory		13,209	15.23%	−18.39%
Turnout		86,719	61.50%	2.21%
Registered electors		148,864		
DMK gain from INC		Swing	-19.97%	

=== 1991 ===
1991 Tamil Nadu Legislative Assembly election: Srivaikuntam
Party	Candidate	Votes	%	±%
INC	S. Daniel Raj	50,800	62.54%	+28.42
DMK	S. David Selvyn	23,486	28.91%	−1.21
BJP	C. Thiru Neelakandan	5,445	6.70%	New
PMK	M. Ysakky	526	0.65%	New
Margin of victory		27,314	33.62%	29.62%
Turnout		81,233	59.29%	−9.78%
Registered electors		142,524		
INC hold		Swing	28.42%	

=== 1989 ===
1989 Tamil Nadu Legislative Assembly election: Srivaikuntam
Party	Candidate	Votes	%	±%
INC	S. Daniel Raj	29,615	34.12%	−19.64
DMK	C. Jegaveerapandian	26,143	30.12%	−14.09
AIADMK	K. Kanagaraj	16,757	19.31%	New
AIADMK	S. Muthukaruppan	12,951	14.92%	New
Independent	M. Arikrishnan	502	0.58%	New
Margin of victory		3,472	4.00%	−5.55%
Turnout		86,797	69.07%	−0.49%
Registered electors		127,689		
INC hold		Swing	-19.64%	

=== 1984 ===
1984 Tamil Nadu Legislative Assembly election: Srivaikuntam
Party	Candidate	Votes	%	±%
INC	S. Daniel Raj	41,513	53.76%	+17.85
DMK	S. P. Muthu	34,140	44.21%	New
Independent	T. Mullai Vazhuthai	501	0.65%	New
Independent	D. Jones	495	0.64%	New
Margin of victory		7,373	9.55%	6.46%
Turnout		77,226	69.56%	7.95%
Registered electors		116,124		
INC gain from AIADMK		Swing	14.76%	

=== 1980 ===
1980 Tamil Nadu Legislative Assembly election: Srivaikuntam
Party	Candidate	Votes	%	±%
AIADMK	E. Ramasubramanian	26,502	38.99%	+7.7
INC	V. Shanmugam	24,404	35.91%	+12.45
Independent	S. P. Adithanar	12,119	17.83%	New
Independent	S. Ashokkumar	3,890	5.72%	New
Independent	L. Chelliah	542	0.80%	New
Independent	P. Pothiah Pillai	511	0.75%	New
Margin of victory		2,098	3.09%	−2.33%
Turnout		67,968	61.61%	2.98%
Registered electors		111,712		
AIADMK hold		Swing	7.70%	

=== 1977 ===
1977 Tamil Nadu Legislative Assembly election: Srivaikuntam
Party	Candidate	Votes	%	±%
AIADMK	K. Sathu Selvaraj	20,459	31.29%	New
DMK	S. Muthu	16,919	25.87%	−29.07
INC	S. Nainar Kulasekaran	15,340	23.46%	−17.35
JP	M. Sankarapandian	12,672	19.38%	New
Margin of victory		3,540	5.41%	−8.72%
Turnout		65,390	58.63%	−16.46%
Registered electors		112,893		
AIADMK gain from DMK		Swing	-23.66%	

=== 1971 ===
1971 Tamil Nadu Legislative Assembly election: Srivaikuntam
Party	Candidate	Votes	%	±%
DMK	S. P. Adithanar	37,329	54.95%	−7.63
INC	R. A. R. Annamalai	27,724	40.81%	+6.75
Independent	T. Natarajan	1,541	2.27%	New
Independent	C. Esakki Thevar	377	0.55%	New
Margin of victory		9,605	14.14%	−14.38%
Turnout		67,938	75.09%	−0.02%
Registered electors		98,701		
DMK hold		Swing	-7.63%	

=== 1967 ===
1967 Madras Legislative Assembly election: Srivaikuntam
Party	Candidate	Votes	%	±%
DMK	S. P. Adithanar	41,828	62.57%	+41.87
INC	R. Nadar	22,767	34.06%	−14.22
Independent	K. Kone	852	1.27%	New
Independent	Perumal	656	0.98%	New
Margin of victory		19,061	28.51%	0.94%
Turnout		66,848	75.12%	6.71%
Registered electors		93,282		
DMK gain from INC		Swing	14.30%	

=== 1962 ===
1962 Madras Legislative Assembly election: Srivaikuntam
Party	Candidate	Votes	%	±%
INC	A. P. C. Veerabahu	29,949	48.28%	−12.79
DMK	S. Pechi	12,844	20.70%	New
SWA	Ganapathi	10,639	17.15%	New
Independent	T. S. Perumal	5,951	9.59%	New
Independent	A. Packianathan	2,655	4.28%	New
Margin of victory		17,105	27.57%	−11.10%
Turnout		62,038	68.41%	15.01%
Registered electors		93,868		
INC hold		Swing	-12.79%	

=== 1957 ===
1957 Madras Legislative Assembly election: Srivaikuntam
Party	Candidate	Votes	%	±%
INC	A. P. C. Veerabahu	29,849	61.06%	New
Independent	Y. Perumal	10,943	22.39%	New
Independent	Jagaveer Rajendran	6,300	12.89%	New
Independent	P. Cheeni	1,792	3.67%	New
Margin of victory		18,906	38.68%	
Turnout		48,884	53.39%	
Registered electors		91,557		
INC win (new seat)				
