= Kondarangi Hills =

Lord Mallikarjuna Swamy Temple

Lord Mallikarjuna Swamy Temple
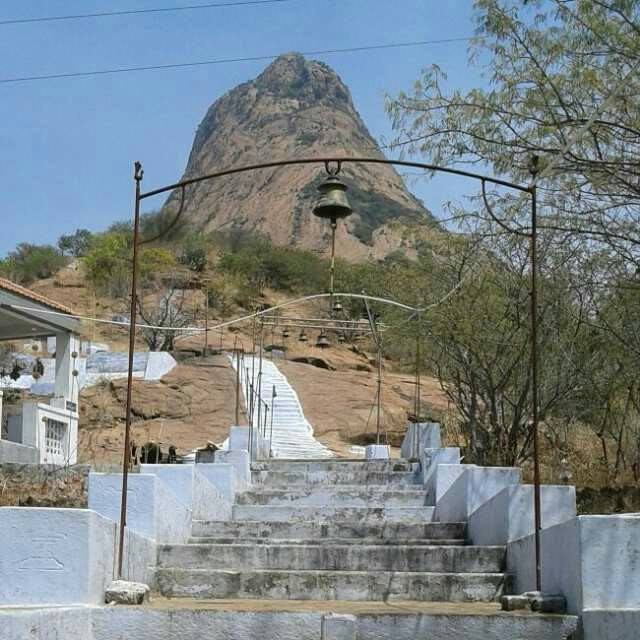
- Lord Mallikarjuna Swamy Temple, Kondarangi Hills

- Location in Tamil Nadu, India

Religion
- Affiliation: Hinduism
- District: Dindigul
- Deity: Shiva

Location
- Location: Kondarangi keeranur
- State: Tamil Nadu
- Country: India
- Interactive map of Lord Mallikarjuna Swamy Temple
- Coordinates: 10.627988°N 77.730901°E

Architecture
- Type: TAMIL ARCHITECTURE

Website
- www.kondarangihills.com

Lord Mallikarjuna Swamy Temple, also known as Kondarangi Hills, is located in Kondarangi Keeranur. Cut into the peak of a mountain, it is believed that worshipers who ascend to the temple may receive divine sanction and blessings from Lord Shiva. A sculpture there is a Swayambhu Lingam. Swayambhu is a Sanskrit word that means "something created by its own agreeing".

== History ==
The duration of human lives are under four periods called yugas: Satya Yuga, Treta Yuga, Dvapara Yuga and Kali Yuga. Some Vedas give some reference that the energy of good vibes, which was considered to be a god in those days, will demolish and rebirth himself to build up lives on earth. During this period, Vedas say that two saints named Kagabajendra and Ganapathy re-birthed themselves as a crow. They stayed alive as an ambassador to a god to regenerate the new world, because of the former demolition. A small cave temple is situated in the top of the hill for the Kagabajendran sage.

It is said that Saint Kagabajendra will visit the temple to worship the god in the form of a mild storm at dusk. This storm will start from the bottom of the hill and end when it enters the temple, lasting for only two seconds.

== Architecture ==
Structures, buildings, and sculptures were built by excavating rock. The temple steps are in a rock-cut framework. Rain or high winds make it difficult to ascend or descend. A perennial spring operates on the top.

== Specialties ==
During British rule, they decided to develop a blueprint to restore the original borders. The blueprint consists of three access points to detect distorted places. The three hills are called Kodaikanal hills, Tirumala hills and Kondarangi hills, known locally as the Malliswar hills. This British framework is known as the Triangle survey. This survey was found to be useful to report the borders of Newland in Tamil Nadu after a severe earthquake.

Worshipers pray by joining hands in a pyramid format, as a reference to Kondarangi.

This place features as a preeminent site for bare-skinned meditation, mostly by maharishis. One point was carved by Pancha Pandavas to worship Lord Shiva. The temple has a Cave where Sidhhars and Thavasis have done meditation. Another temple located in the foothills is known as Ketti Malleswarar Sri Bhramaramba Temple.

== Transport ==
The temple is 19 km from Oddanchatram Railway station to Lord Mallikarjuna Swamy Temple – Kondarangi Hills Temple.

== Festivals ==
The most celebrated festival is the Mahasivarathri and Chitra Pournami.

Other festivals are Paradhosam, Ammavasai, and Pournami. Paradhosam is a Lord Shiva prayer conducted after 15 days of each month. Ammavasai is a new moon festival on the Hindu lunar calendar that is also celebrated in Kondarangi hills. The Pournami festival is a common Indian festival among the Tamil Hindus, a prayer festival dedicated to the Hindu god of underworld. On Mondays, special poojas may be conducted.
