= S. Daniel Raj =

Indian politician

S. Daniel Raj was an Indian politician and former Member of the Legislative Assembly. He was elected to the Tamil Nadu legislative assembly as an Indian National Congress candidate from Srivaikuntam constituency in 1984, 1989 and 1991 elections.
