= Oddanchatram Assembly constituency =

One of the 234 State Legislative Assembly Constituencies in Tamil Nadu, in India

Coordinates: 10°29′18″N 77°44′05″E

Oddanchatram
- Constituency No. 128 for the Tamil Nadu Legislative Assembly

Constituency details
- Country: India
- Region: South India
- State: Tamil Nadu
- District: Dindigul
- Lok Sabha constituency: Dindigul
- Established: 1951
- Total electors: 2,20,263
- Reservation: None

Member of Legislative Assembly
- 17th Tamil Nadu Legislative Assembly
- Incumbent R. Sakkarapani
- Party: DMK
- Elected year: 2026

Oddanchatram is a state assembly constituency in Dindigul district in Tamil Nadu, India. Its State Assembly Constituency number is 128. It comes under Dindigul Lok Sabha constituency. It is one of the 234 State Legislative Assembly Constituencies in Tamil Nadu, in India.

== Members of Legislative Assembly ==
Year	Member	Political party
Madras State
1952	Subramaniya Lakshmipathi Naicker	Independent politician
1957	Karuthappa Gounder	Independent politician
1957	Karuthappa Gounder	Indian National Congress
1962	A. Senapathi Gounder	Indian National Congress
1967	N. Gounder	Dravida Munnetra Kazhagam
Tamil Nadu
1971	N. Nachimuthu Goundar	Dravida Munnetra Kazhagam
1977	A. P. Palaniappan	Indian National Congress
1980	K. Kuppuswamy	All India Anna Dravida Munnetra Kazhagam
1984	K. Kuppuswamy	All India Anna Dravida Munnetra Kazhagam
1989	P. Kaliappan	Dravida Munnetra Kazhagam
1991	A. T. Chellamuthu	All India Anna Dravida Munnetra Kazhagam
1996	R. Sakkarapani	Dravida Munnetra Kazhagam
2001	R. Sakkarapani	Dravida Munnetra Kazhagam
2006	R. Sakkarapani	Dravida Munnetra Kazhagam
2011	R. Sakkarapani	Dravida Munnetra Kazhagam
2016	R. Sakkarapani	Dravida Munnetra Kazhagam
2021	R. Sakkarapani	Dravida Munnetra Kazhagam
2026	R. Sakkarapani	Dravida Munnetra Kazhagam

== Election results ==
Vote share of winning candidates
2026	46.17%
2021	54.90%
2016	64.26%
2011	51.99%
2006	53.67%
2001	46.40%
1996	58.57%
1991	69.83%
1989	35.81%
1984	49.86%
1980	45.26%
1977	37.09%
1971	58.99%
1967	55.55%
1962	54.25%
1957	73.94%
1952	48.58%

=== 2026 ===
2026 Tamil Nadu Legislative Assembly election: Oddanchatram
Party	Candidate	Votes	%	±%
DMK	Sakkarapani.R	93,099	46.17	▼8.73
TMC(M) (BJP)	Vidiyal S. Sekar	49,850	24.72	
TVK	S. Mohan	49,155	24.38	New
NTK	Ragupathi.P	5,454	2.71	▲0.24
NOTA	NOTA	1,491	0.74	▲0.01
Margin of victory		43,249	21.45	▲7.10
Turnout		2,01,624	91.54	▲8.50
Registered electors		2,20,263		▼20,953
DMK hold		Swing	▼8.73	

=== 2021 ===
2021 Tamil Nadu Legislative Assembly election: Oddanchatram
Party	Candidate	Votes	%	±%
DMK	R. Sakkarapani	109,970	54.90%	▼9.36
AIADMK	N. P. Nataraj	81,228	40.55%	▲10.99
NTK	T. Sakthi Devi	4,944	2.47%	▲2.15
NOTA	Nota	1,457	0.73%	▲0.05
DMDK	M. Siva Kumar	1,427	0.71%	New
MNM	A. Abdul Hadi	1,082	0.54%	New
Margin of victory		28,742	14.35%	−20.35%
Turnout		200,299	83.04%	−1.87%
Rejected ballots		82	0.04%	
Registered electors		241,216		
DMK hold		Swing	-9.36%	

=== 2016 ===
2016 Tamil Nadu Legislative Assembly election: Oddanchatram
Party	Candidate	Votes	%	±%
DMK	R. Sakkarapani	121,715	64.26%	▲12.27
AIADMK	K. Kittusamy	55,988	29.56%	▼13.58
CPI	K. Santhanam	3,684	1.94%	New
BJP	S. K. Palanisamy	1,909	1.01%	▼0
NOTA	None Of The Above	1,274	0.67%	New
Independent	K. Muthukumar	1,050	0.55%	New
Margin of victory		65,727	34.70%	25.85%
Turnout		189,414	84.91%	−1.21%
Registered electors		223,074		
DMK hold		Swing	12.27%	

=== 2011 ===
2011 Tamil Nadu Legislative Assembly election: Oddanchatram
Party	Candidate	Votes	%	±%
DMK	R. Sakkarapani	87,743	51.99%	▼1.68
AIADMK	P. Baalasubramani	72,810	43.14%	▲6.21
Independent	P. Velkumar	3,092	1.83%	New
BJP	S. K. Palanisamy	1,708	1.01%	▼0.37
Margin of victory		14,933	8.85%	−7.89%
Turnout		195,975	86.13%	11.39%
Registered electors		168,785		
DMK hold		Swing	-1.68%	

=== 2006 ===
2006 Tamil Nadu Legislative Assembly election: Oddanchatram
Party	Candidate	Votes	%	±%
DMK	R. Sakkarapani	63,811	53.67%	▲7.27
AIADMK	K. P. Nallasamy	43,908	36.93%	▼8.27
DMDK	S. Balasubramani	5,457	4.59%	New
BJP	P. Karuppusamy	1,642	1.38%	New
Independent	S. Murugan	1,199	1.01%	New
AIFB	M. Inbaraja	739	0.62%	New
Independent	K. Chellamuthu	595	0.50%	New
Margin of victory		19,903	16.74%	15.54%
Turnout		118,896	74.73%	10.28%
Registered electors		159,094		
DMK hold		Swing	7.27%	

=== 2001 ===
2001 Tamil Nadu Legislative Assembly election: Oddanchatram
Party	Candidate	Votes	%	±%
DMK	R. Sakkarapani	52,896	46.40%	▼12.17
AIADMK	A. T. Sellasamy	51,527	45.20%	▲19.12
MDMK	Pon. Churchill	4,525	3.97%	▼3.59
Independent	P. Loganathan	1,962	1.72%	New
Independent	A. Arjunan	1,242	1.09%	New
Independent	P. Murugan	556	0.49%	New
Margin of victory		1,369	1.20%	−31.29%
Turnout		114,010	64.45%	−4.62%
Registered electors		176,900		
DMK hold		Swing	-12.17%	

=== 1996 ===
1996 Tamil Nadu Legislative Assembly election: Oddanchatram
Party	Candidate	Votes	%	±%
DMK	R. Sakkarapani	66,379	58.57%	▲29.55
AIADMK	K. Sellamuthu	29,556	26.08%	▼43.75
MDMK	T. Mohan	8,565	7.56%	New
Independent	R. Eswaravel	5,392	4.76%	New
BJP	N. Senniappan	1,457	1.29%	New
Margin of victory		36,823	32.49%	−8.31%
Turnout		113,331	69.07%	6.10%
Registered electors		170,995		
DMK gain from AIADMK		Swing	-11.26%	

=== 1991 ===
1991 Tamil Nadu Legislative Assembly election: Oddanchatram
Party	Candidate	Votes	%	±%
AIADMK	A. T. Chellamuthu	72,669	69.83%	▲39.44
DMK	T. Mohan	30,205	29.02%	▼6.79
Margin of victory		42,464	40.80%	35.38%
Turnout		104,070	62.96%	−11.18%
Registered electors		170,862		
AIADMK gain from DMK		Swing	34.01%	

=== 1989 ===
1989 Tamil Nadu Legislative Assembly election: Oddanchatram
Party	Candidate	Votes	%	±%
DMK	P. Kaliappan	38,540	35.81%	New
AIADMK	P. Balasubramani	32,699	30.38%	▼19.47
INC	A. P. Palaniappan	25,370	23.57%	New
AIADMK	K. Kuppuswamy	8,445	7.85%	▼42.01
Margin of victory		5,841	5.43%	2.77%
Turnout		107,616	74.14%	−0.98%
Registered electors		147,504		
DMK gain from AIADMK		Swing	-14.04%	

=== 1984 ===
1984 Tamil Nadu Legislative Assembly election: Oddanchatram
Party	Candidate	Votes	%	±%
AIADMK	K. Kuppuswamy	46,466	49.86%	▲4.59
Independent	K. Chellamuthu	43,985	47.19%	New
Independent	P. Naguvel	565	0.61%	New
Independent	M. Thangavel	518	0.56%	New
Independent	P. Chinnappan	477	0.51%	New
Independent	M. V. Gopal	471	0.51%	New
Margin of victory		2,481	2.66%	−11.95%
Turnout		93,200	75.12%	14.84%
Registered electors		132,723		
AIADMK hold		Swing	4.59%	

=== 1980 ===
1980 Tamil Nadu Legislative Assembly election: Oddanchatram
Party	Candidate	Votes	%	±%
AIADMK	K. Kuppuswamy	35,269	45.26%	▲14.47
INC	S. K. Palaniswamy	23,882	30.65%	▼6.44
Independent	A. P. Palaniyappan	18,480	23.72%	New
Margin of victory		11,387	14.61%	8.32%
Turnout		77,922	60.28%	0.32%
Registered electors		131,378		
AIADMK gain from INC		Swing	8.18%	

=== 1977 ===
1977 Tamil Nadu Legislative Assembly election: Oddanchatram
Party	Candidate	Votes	%	±%
INC	A. P. Palaniappan	27,000	37.09%	▼2.86
AIADMK	K. Kuppuswamy	22,419	30.79%	New
DMK	K. Muthusamy	15,072	20.70%	▼38.29
JP	P. Kaliappan	5,925	8.14%	New
Independent	C. Kathamuthu	1,696	2.33%	New
Independent	R. Kalyanasamy	692	0.95%	New
Margin of victory		4,581	6.29%	−12.76%
Turnout		72,804	59.96%	−8.04%
Registered electors		123,168		
INC gain from DMK		Swing	-21.91%	

=== 1971 ===
1971 Tamil Nadu Legislative Assembly election: Oddanchatram
Party	Candidate	Votes	%	±%
DMK	N. Nachimuthu Goundar	40,845	58.99%	▲3.45
INC	A. P. Palaniyappan	27,654	39.94%	▼3.24
Independent	S. Mariyappa Gounder	736	1.06%	New
Margin of victory		13,191	19.05%	6.69%
Turnout		69,235	68.00%	−7.42%
Registered electors		105,416		
DMK hold		Swing	3.45%	

=== 1967 ===
1967 Madras Legislative Assembly election: Oddanchatram
Party	Candidate	Votes	%	±%
DMK	N. Gounder	39,817	55.55%	▲12.11
INC	A. P. Palaniappan	30,953	43.18%	▼11.06
Independent	V. S. M. Gounder	910	1.27%	New
Margin of victory		8,864	12.37%	1.56%
Turnout		71,680	75.42%	6.35%
Registered electors		98,705		
DMK gain from INC		Swing	1.30%	

=== 1962 ===
1962 Madras Legislative Assembly election: Oddanchatram
Party	Candidate	Votes	%	±%
INC	A. Senapathi Gounder	30,380	54.25%	▼19.69
DMK	Nachimuthu Gounder	24,327	43.44%	New
Independent	Mariappa Gounder	1,297	2.32%	New
Margin of victory		6,053	10.81%	−37.07%
Turnout		56,004	69.07%	25.05%
Registered electors		85,019		
INC hold		Swing	-19.69%	

=== 1957 ===
1957 Madras Legislative Assembly election: Oddanchatram
Party	Candidate	Votes	%	±%
INC	K. Karuthappa Gounder	26,646	73.94%	▲35.26
Independent	Angamuthu Naicker	9,392	26.06%	New
Margin of victory		17,254	47.88%	37.98%
Turnout		36,038	44.02%	−16.45%
Registered electors		81,873		
INC gain from Independent		Swing	25.36%	

=== 1952 ===
1952 Madras Legislative Assembly election: Oddanchatram
Party	Candidate	Votes	%	±%
Independent	Subramaniya Lakshmipathy Naicker	20,076	48.58%	New
INC	K. Karuthappa Gounder	15,986	38.68%	New
CPI	A. Kamal Yusuf Rowther	5,266	12.74%	New
Margin of victory		4,090	9.90%	
Turnout		41,328	60.47%	
Registered electors		68,349		
Independent win (new seat)				
