= A. P. C. Veerabahu =

Indian politician

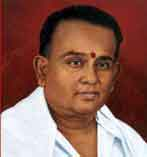
- A P C Veerabahu

Member of the Madras State Assembly
- In office 1957–1962
- Preceded by: Y. Perumal
- Constituency: Srivaikuntam
- In office 1962–1967
- Preceded by: S. Pechi
- Constituency: Srivaikuntam

Personal details
- Party: Indian National Congress
- Occupation: Politician

A. P. C. Veerbahu was an Indian politician and former Member of the Legislative Assembly. He was elected to the Tamil Nadu legislative assembly as an Indian National Congress candidate from Srivaikuntam constituency in 1957 and 1962 elections.
