= K. M. Kalaiselvi =

Indian politician (born 1949)

Member-Tamil Nadu Legislative Assembly
- In office 1991–1996
- Preceded by: Durai Murugan
- Succeeded by: Durai Murugan
- Constituency: Katpadi

Personal details
- Born: 7 April 1949 Kankuppam
- Party: All India Anna Dravida Munnetra Kazhagam
- Occupation: Politician

Kankuppam M. Kalaiselvi is an Indian politician and a former Member of the Tamil Nadu Legislative Assembly (MLA) for the Katpadi Assembly constituency. She contested and won the Katpadi Assembly constituency in the 1991 Tamil Nadu Legislative Assembly election. Kalaiselvi contested as a candidate of the All India Anna Dravida Munnetra Kazhagam (AIADMK) party.

== Electoral Performance ==
=== 1991 ===
1991 Tamil Nadu Legislative Assembly election: Katpadi
| Party | Candidate | Votes | % | ±% |
|---|---|---|---|---|
| AIADMK | K. M. Kalaiselvi | 63,005 | 56.43% | +32.96 |
| DMK | Durai Murugan | 36,866 | 33.02% | −10.39 |
| PMK | M. Damodaran | 8,778 | 7.86% | New |
| Independent | G. Subramani | 1,980 | 1.77% | New |
| Margin of victory | | 26,139 | 23.41% | 3.47% |
| Turnout | | 111,652 | 66.77% | −2.93% |
| Registered electors | | 173,715 | | |
| AIADMK gain from DMK | | Swing | 13.02% | |
