= N. A. Poongavanam =

Indian politician

Member-Tamil Nadu Legislative Assembly
- In office 1980–1984
- Preceded by: M. A. Jayavelu
- Succeeded by: G. Ragupathi
- Constituency: Katpadi

Personal details
- Born: 1927 (age 98–99) Nayakkanthoppu
- Party: Communist Party of India
- Occupation: Politician

Nayakkanthoppu A. Poongavanam is an Indian politician and a former Member of the Tamil Nadu Legislative Assembly (MLA) for the Katpadi Assembly constituency. Poongavanam is a party member of Communist Party of India (CPI). He contested and won the Katpadi Assembly constituency in the 1980 Tamil Nadu Legislative Assembly election on behalf of the Communist Party of India.

== Electoral Performance ==
=== 1980 ===
1980 Tamil Nadu Legislative Assembly election: Katpadi
Party	Candidate	Votes	%	±%
CPI	N. A. Poongavanam	31,918	46.48%	New
INC	A. K. Shanmugasundaram	26,639	38.79%	+34.37
JP	T. R. Ranga Reddy	7,214	10.50%	New
Independent	M. A. Jayavelu	2,905	4.23%	New
Margin of victory		5,279	7.69%	1.02%
Turnout		68,676	57.64%	−5.08%
Registered electors		121,387		
CPI gain from AIADMK		Swing	8.30%	
