= Kondarangi Keeranur =

Kondarangi Keeranur K. Keeranur
- Village
- Nickname: K. Keeranur
- Location in Tamil Nadu, India Kondarangi Keeranur (India)
- Coordinates: 10.615°N 77.724°E
- Country: India
- State: Tamil Nadu
- District: Dindigul

Government
  - Body: panchayat
  - Member of the Legislative Assembly (India): R. Sakkarapani
  - Panchayat President: Mrs. Vijayalakshmi Shanmugasundar

Population (2011)
  - Total: 30,064

Languages
  - Official: Tamil
- Time zone: UTC+5:30 (IST)
- PIN: 624616
- Telephone code: 04553
- Vehicle registration: TN-57/TN-94
- Website: Official Keeranur Panchayat Website

Kondarangi Keeranur known as K Keeranur is a panchayat located in Oddanchatram Tk, Dindigul Dt., Tamil Nadu, India. The village is a multi caste one with a population of 5000. Kondarangi Keeranur panchayat has eight hamlets namely Vellianvalasu, Perumal Goundan Valasu, Chinnakaliappa Goundan Valasu, Idayan Valasu, Cherian Nagar, Miras Nagar, Maleeswarapuram and Anna Nagar. The main activity of the village is Agriculture. Current Panchayat president is Mrs.Vijayalakshmi shanmugasundar, DMK who is well known personality in Oddanchatram Taluk. Panchayat won the Uthamar Gandhi Award of the year 2006.

== Location/Map ==
North by Mulanur in Tiruppur District, South by Oddanchatram, Taluk Headquarters, West by Kallimandayam, East by Idayakottai and connected by State High ways roads.

== Temples ==
K Keeranur has five temples, namely,

1. Mallikarjuna Swamy Temple (Kondarangi Hills) [well known famous temple, celebrated in Chithirai Pournami, Maha Shivaratri]
2. Mayavan temple [ Naayakar's are main devotees]
3. Kaliamman temple
4. Vinayagar temple
5. Mandha pidari temple

== Water Facilities ==
The panchayat have overhead tanks, mini pumps, ground level reservoirs and also hand pumps for water supply. Every hamlet is connected with overhead tanks with sufficient power supply. House connections are also given to most of the houses. More than 100 public tapes are provided for water supply.

== Schools ==
K Keeranur has one middle school-Panchayat Union Higher Elementary School)s and hamlets have 3 elementary schools.

== Bank / ATM ==
Canara Bank with ATM

== Hospital ==
Primary Health Centre with MBBS, BDS & Homeopathic Doctors

== Medicals ==
Totally 1 medical shop available.

1. Prakash medicals

== Cellphone Towers ==
Most of the mobile network companies installed towers to cover signals with near by 5 villages.

1. Vodafone
2. Airtel (with 4G service)
3. Jio (with 4G service)

== Specialties ==
Total Sanitation village Families adopt family planning in letter and spirit. Most of them have one child (who are below 50 years) and others maximum of two children.

== Panchayat President ==
Mrs.vijayalakshmi shanmugasundar
