= E. Ramasubramanian =

Indian politician

E. Ramasubramanian is an Indian politician and former Member of the Legislative Assembly. He was elected to the Tamil Nadu legislative assembly as an Anna Dravida Munnetra Kazhagam candidate from Srivaikuntam constituency in 1980 election.
