= K. Sathu Selvaraj =

Indian politician

K. Sathu Selvaraj is an Indian politician and former Member of the Legislative Assembly. He was elected to the Tamil Nadu Legislative Assembly as an Anna Dravida Munnetra Kazhagam candidate from Srivaikuntam constituency in 1977 election.
