= Kallimandayam =

Coordinates: 10°35′N 77°41′E

Kallimanthayam
- Village Panchayat
- Interactive map of Kallimanthayam
- Country: India
- State: Tamil Nadu
- District: Dindugal
- Taluk: Oddanchattiram

Languages
  - Official: Tamil
- Time zone: UTC+5:30 (IST)
- PIN: 624616

Kallimathayam is a village located along Tiruppur-Dharapuram-Oddanchatram highway.

Kallimanthayam Village Panchayat falls under Thoppampatti Union and Oddanchatram taluk of Dindigul district, Tamil Nadu. Kallimanthayam is located 17.6 Km distance from Thoppampatti and 40.7 Km from Dindugal. It is bounded by Kondarangi Keeranur in the west, Kolinjivadi in the north, Idaiyakottai in the east and Tangachiyammapatti in the south.

== Kallimandayam Gram Panchayat ==
Kallimandhayam Gram Panchayat has eighteen small hamlets attached to it for administrative purposes.

1. Velayuthampalayam
2. Arranmanaivalasu
3. Esakaampatti
4. Thumbichipalayam
5. Kootakkaaranputhur
6. C.Pongavalasu (rengapalayam)
7. P.Pongavalasu (kaliappagoundan patti)
8. Kallimandayam
9. Vangaarachinnapatti (thekkur)
10. Thoopakkavalasu
11. Sengaataanvalasu
12. Neelagoundanpatti
13. Malayandigoundanvalasu
14. Othaiyur village

== Education ==
In Kallimandhayam there is one higher secondary school, ten government primary schools, and one middle school, including CSI High school and Tirupathi Arul Nery Hr. school, also a private school brindavan matric school. Kallimandhayam also has a primary health centre.
