= J. Jayasingh Thiyagaraj Natterjee =

Indian lawyer and politician

Member of Parliament, Lok Sabha
- In office 4 June 2014 – 24 May 2019
- Prime Minister: Narendra Modi
- Preceded by: S. R. Jeyadurai
- Succeeded by: Kanimozhi Rajathi Karunanidhi
- Constituency: Thoothukkudi

Chairperson – District Development Coordination and Monitoring Committee
- In office 4 June 2014 – 24 May 2019
- Preceded by: S. R. Jeyadurai
- Succeeded by: Kanimozhi Rajathi Karunanidhi

Chairperson – Thoothukudi Airport Advisory Committee
- In office 4 June 2014 – 24 May 2019
- Preceded by: S. R. Jeyadurai
- Succeeded by: Kanimozhi Rajathi Karunanidhi

Personal details
- Born: 15 April 1953 (age 73)
- Citizenship: Indian
- Party: All India Anna Dravida Munnetra Kazhagam
- Profession: Lawyer

J. Jayasingh Thiyagaraj Natterjee is an Indian lawyer and politician belonging to the All India Anna Dravida Munnetra Kazhagam (AIADMK). He was a former Member of Parliament, representing Thoothukkudi constituency in the Lok Sabha (the lower house of India's Parliament) from 2014 to 2019.

J.J.T.Natterjee is a native of the Jacobpuram village, which is located in the Radhapuram taluk. He joined the AIADMK in 1984 before M.G R. He was the party's organizing secretary from 2015-2019, now he is the deputy secretary of AIADMK lawyers' wing. He is also an administrative committee member of the Church of South India's Tuticorin-Nazareth Diocese.

In the 2014 Lok Sabha elections, he defeated P. Jegan of Dravida Munnetra Kazhagam by a margin of 1,24,002 votes.
