= Katpadi Assembly constituency =

State Legislative Assembly Constituency in Tamil Nadu

Coordinates: 12.98°N 79.13°E

Katpadi
- Constituency No. 40 for the Tamil Nadu Legislative Assembly

Constituency details
- Country: India
- Region: South India
- State: Tamil Nadu
- District: Vellore
- Lok Sabha constituency: Arakkonam
- Established: 1962
- Total electors: 2,30,148
- Reservation: None

Member of Legislative Assembly
- 17th Tamil Nadu Legislative Assembly
- Incumbent Dr. M. Sudhakar
- Party: TVK
- Elected year: 2026

Katpadi is a state assembly constituency in Vellore district in Tamil Nadu, India. Its State Assembly Constituency number is 40. It comprises portions of the Katpadi, Vellore, and Walajah taluks. It is a part of Arakkonam Lok Sabha constituency for national elections to the Parliament of India. The constituency was formed in 1962 by separating Gudiyatham Assembly constituency. It is one of the 234 State Legislative Assembly Constituencies in Tamil Nadu, in India.

== Demographics ==
Demographics (2016)
Category	Data
Created	2016
Adi dravidar	25%
Vanniyar	25%
Thuluva Vellalar	20%
Telugu People and Religious Minorities	20%
Others	10%
Total Electorate (2016)	2,29,868

== Members of Legislative Assembly ==
Year	Member	Political party
Madras State
1962	B. Rajagopal Naidu	Indian National Congress
1967	G. Natarajan	Dravida Munnetra Kazhagam
Tamil Nadu
1971	Durai Murugan	Dravida Munnetra Kazhagam
1977	M. A. Jayavelu	All India Anna Dravida Munnetra Kazhagam
1980	N. A. Poongavanam	Communist Party of India
1984	G. Ragupathi	All India Anna Dravida Munnetra Kazhagam
1989	Durai Murugan	Dravida Munnetra Kazhagam
1991	K. M. Kalaiselvi	All India Anna Dravida Munnetra Kazhagam
1996	Durai Murugan	Dravida Munnetra Kazhagam
2001	Durai Murugan	Dravida Munnetra Kazhagam
2006	Durai Murugan	Dravida Munnetra Kazhagam
2011	Durai Murugan	Dravida Munnetra Kazhagam
2016	Durai Murugan	Dravida Munnetra Kazhagam
2021	Durai Murugan	Dravida Munnetra Kazhagam
2026	Dr. M. Sudhakar	Tamilaga Vettri Kazhagam

== Election results ==
Vote share of winning candidates
2026	34.33%
2021	46.18%
2016	50.90%
2011	49.55%
2006	57.45%
2001	49.47%
1996	61.20%
1991	56.43%
1989	43.41%
1984	57.08%
1980	46.48%
1977	38.18%
1971	57.79%
1967	53.06%
1962	44.19%

=== 2026 ===
2026 Tamil Nadu Legislative Assembly election: Katpadi
Party	Candidate	Votes	%	±%
TVK	Dr. M. Sudhakar	69,868	34.33	New
AIADMK	V. Ramu	63,998	31.45	▼14.33
DMK	Duraimurugan	62,225	30.58	▼15.60
NTK	S. Thirukkumaran	4,625	2.27	▼3.40
NOTA	NOTA	745	0.37	▼0.65
BSP	J. Ramesh	407	0.20	New
Independent	D. Ramu	323	0.16	New
Tamil Manila Murpokku Dravida Kazhagam	Indu. W	319	0.16	New
Independent	Dhananchezhiyan	215	0.11	New
All India Puratchi Thalaivar Makkal Munnetra Kazhagam	V. Chandran	187	0.09	New
Independent	M. Suthakar	145	0.07	New
Tamil Nadu Ilangyar Katchi	S. Balaji	140	0.07	New
Independent	Dhanasekar	122	0.06	New
Indhu Dravida Makkal Katchi	Ganesan. P	79	0.04	New
Independent	Saravanan. D	54	0.03	New
Independent	S. Raman	45	0.02	New
Margin of victory		5,870	2.88	▲2.48
Turnout		2,03,497	88.42	▲14.25
Registered electors		2,30,148		▼18,419
TVK gain from DMK		Swing	▲34.33	

=== 2021 ===
2021 Tamil Nadu Legislative Assembly election: Katpadi
Party	Candidate	Votes	%	±%
DMK	Durai Murugan	85,140	46.18%	−4.72
AIADMK	V. Ramu	84,394	45.78%	+8.34
NTK	S. Thirukkumaran	10,449	5.67%	+5.03
NOTA	NOTA	1,889	1.02%	−0.38
AMMK	A. S. Raja	1,066	0.58%	New
IJK	M. Sudharsan	1,003	0.54%	New
Margin of victory		746	0.40%	−13.06%
Turnout		184,357	74.17%	−3.21%
Rejected ballots		517	0.28%	
Registered electors		248,567		
DMK hold		Swing	-4.72%	

=== 2016 ===
2016 Tamil Nadu Legislative Assembly election: Katpadi
Party	Candidate	Votes	%	±%
DMK	Durai Murugan	90,534	50.90%	+1.35
AIADMK	S. R. K. Appu	66,588	37.44%	−10.15
PMK	N. T. Shanmugam	12,728	7.16%	New
NOTA	NOTA	2,492	1.40%	New
TMC(M)	T. V. Sivanandam	2,163	1.22%	New
NTK	L. Puviarasan	1,135	0.64%	New
Margin of victory		23,946	13.46%	11.50%
Turnout		177,870	77.38%	−2.17%
Registered electors		229,868		
DMK hold		Swing	1.35%	

=== 2011 ===
2011 Tamil Nadu Legislative Assembly election: Katpadi
Party	Candidate	Votes	%	±%
DMK	Durai Murugan	75,064	49.55%	−7.9
AIADMK	S. R. K. Appu (A) S. Radhakrishnan.	72,091	47.59%	+13.39
BJP	A. Varadarajan	1,539	1.02%	−0.01
Independent	M. Sriram	1,067	0.70%	New
Margin of victory		2,973	1.96%	−21.29%
Turnout		151,498	79.54%	9.15%
Registered electors		190,456		
DMK hold		Swing	-7.90%	

=== 2006 ===
2006 Tamil Nadu Legislative Assembly election: Katpadi
Party	Candidate	Votes	%	±%
DMK	Durai Murugan	86,824	57.45%	+7.98
AIADMK	B. Narayanan	51,677	34.19%	New
DMDK	S. Radha Krishanan	8,492	5.62%	New
BJP	V. R. Suresh	1,543	1.02%	New
Independent	K. Jaganathan	779	0.52%	New
Margin of victory		35,147	23.26%	17.09%
Turnout		151,130	70.39%	3.43%
Registered electors		214,702		
DMK hold		Swing	7.98%	

=== 2001 ===
2001 Tamil Nadu Legislative Assembly election: Katpadi
Party	Candidate	Votes	%	±%
DMK	Durai Murugan	64,187	49.47%	−11.73
PMK	A. K. Natarajan	56,185	43.30%	+39.21
MDMK	Satchidanandam D	2,923	2.25%	New
Independent	S. Sellapandiyan	1,997	1.54%	New
Puratchi Bharatham	G. Deenadhayalan	1,563	1.20%	New
Independent	M. Velmurugan	1,071	0.83%	New
Independent	Venkatesan K	781	0.60%	New
Independent	A. N. Selvam	766	0.59%	New
Margin of victory		8,002	6.17%	−27.10%
Turnout		129,746	66.96%	−3.43%
Registered electors		193,925		
DMK hold		Swing	-11.73%	

=== 1996 ===
1996 Tamil Nadu Legislative Assembly election: Katpadi
Party	Candidate	Votes	%	±%
DMK	Durai Murugan	75,439	61.20%	+28.18
AIADMK	K. Pandurangan	34,432	27.93%	−28.5
PMK	B. Murugesan	5,042	4.09%	New
CPI(M)	T. R. Purushothaman	4,819	3.91%	New
Independent	S. Sellapandian	2,037	1.65%	New
Margin of victory		41,007	33.27%	9.86%
Turnout		123,266	70.39%	3.62%
Registered electors		181,380		
DMK gain from AIADMK		Swing	4.77%	

=== 1991 ===
1991 Tamil Nadu Legislative Assembly election: Katpadi
Party	Candidate	Votes	%	±%
AIADMK	K. M. Kalaiselvi	63,005	56.43%	+32.96
DMK	Durai Murugan	36,866	33.02%	−10.39
PMK	M. Damodaran	8,778	7.86%	New
Independent	G. Subramani	1,980	1.77%	New
Margin of victory		26,139	23.41%	3.47%
Turnout		111,652	66.77%	−2.93%
Registered electors		173,715		
AIADMK gain from DMK		Swing	13.02%	

=== 1989 ===
1989 Tamil Nadu Legislative Assembly election: Katpadi
Party	Candidate	Votes	%	±%
DMK	Durai Murugan	43,181	43.41%	+3.79
AIADMK	R. Margabandu	23,344	23.47%	−33.61
INC	V. Dhandayutha Pani	20,859	20.97%	New
AIADMK	A. M. Ragunatan	8,858	8.90%	−48.17
Independent	K. P. Santhana Raj	2,192	2.20%	New
Margin of victory		19,837	19.94%	2.48%
Turnout		99,475	69.71%	−6.02%
Registered electors		145,879		
DMK gain from AIADMK		Swing	-13.67%	

=== 1984 ===
1984 Tamil Nadu Legislative Assembly election: Katpadi
Party	Candidate	Votes	%	±%
AIADMK	G. Raghupathi	53,077	57.08%	New
DMK	Durai Murugan	36,839	39.62%	New
Independent	T. K. Somasundaram	1,195	1.29%	New
Independent	R. G. S. Mahalingam	983	1.06%	New
Independent	K. P. Santhanaraj	894	0.96%	New
Margin of victory		16,238	17.46%	9.78%
Turnout		92,988	75.73%	18.09%
Registered electors		127,249		
AIADMK gain from CPI		Swing	10.60%	

=== 1980 ===
1980 Tamil Nadu Legislative Assembly election: Katpadi
Party	Candidate	Votes	%	±%
CPI	N. A. Poongavanam	31,918	46.48%	New
INC	A. K. Shanmugasundaram	26,639	38.79%	+34.37
JP	T. R. Ranga Reddy	7,214	10.50%	New
Independent	M. A. Jayavelu	2,905	4.23%	New
Margin of victory		5,279	7.69%	1.02%
Turnout		68,676	57.64%	−5.08%
Registered electors		121,387		
CPI gain from AIADMK		Swing	8.30%	

=== 1977 ===
1977 Tamil Nadu Legislative Assembly election: Katpadi
Party	Candidate	Votes	%	±%
AIADMK	M. A. Jayavelu	26,873	38.18%	New
DMK	Sambasivam	22,183	31.51%	−26.27
JP	K. P. Navakoti	15,683	22.28%	New
INC	V. N. Rathinam	3,114	4.42%	−27.82
Independent	P. Natarajan	1,112	1.58%	New
Independent	Ramasamy Alias Shozhan	878	1.25%	New
Independent	K. Govindaraji	546	0.78%	New
Margin of victory		4,690	6.66%	−18.88%
Turnout		70,389	62.72%	−11.43%
Registered electors		113,689		
AIADMK gain from DMK		Swing	-19.61%	

=== 1971 ===
1971 Tamil Nadu Legislative Assembly election: Katpadi
Party	Candidate	Votes	%	±%
DMK	Durai Murugan	37,487	57.79%	+4.73
INC	Dhandayuthapani	20,919	32.25%	−8.05
CPI(M)	Sundaram	6,133	9.45%	New
Independent	M. Manickam	329	0.51%	New
Margin of victory		16,568	25.54%	12.79%
Turnout		64,868	74.15%	−4.87%
Registered electors		91,305		
DMK hold		Swing	4.73%	

=== 1967 ===
1967 Madras Legislative Assembly election: Katpadi
Party	Candidate	Votes	%	±%
DMK	G. Natarajan	32,952	53.06%	+18.38
INC	P. S. R. Naidu	25,032	40.30%	−3.88
RPI	C. Gopal	4,125	6.64%	New
Margin of victory		7,920	12.75%	3.24%
Turnout		62,109	79.02%	5.40%
Registered electors		82,615		
DMK gain from INC		Swing	8.87%	

=== 1962 ===
1962 Madras Legislative Assembly election: Katpadi
Party	Candidate	Votes	%	±%
INC	B. Rajagopal Naidu	26,389	44.19%	New
DMK	Natarajan	20,710	34.68%	New
CPI	Kothandaraman	10,192	17.07%	New
PSP	A. Kulasekara Naidu	1,219	2.04%	New
Independent	C. R. Gopal	1,212	2.03%	New
Margin of victory		5,679	9.51%	
Turnout		59,722	73.62%	
Registered electors		85,824		
INC win (new seat)				
