= S. R. Jeyadurai =

Indian politician

Dr. S. R. Jeyadurai
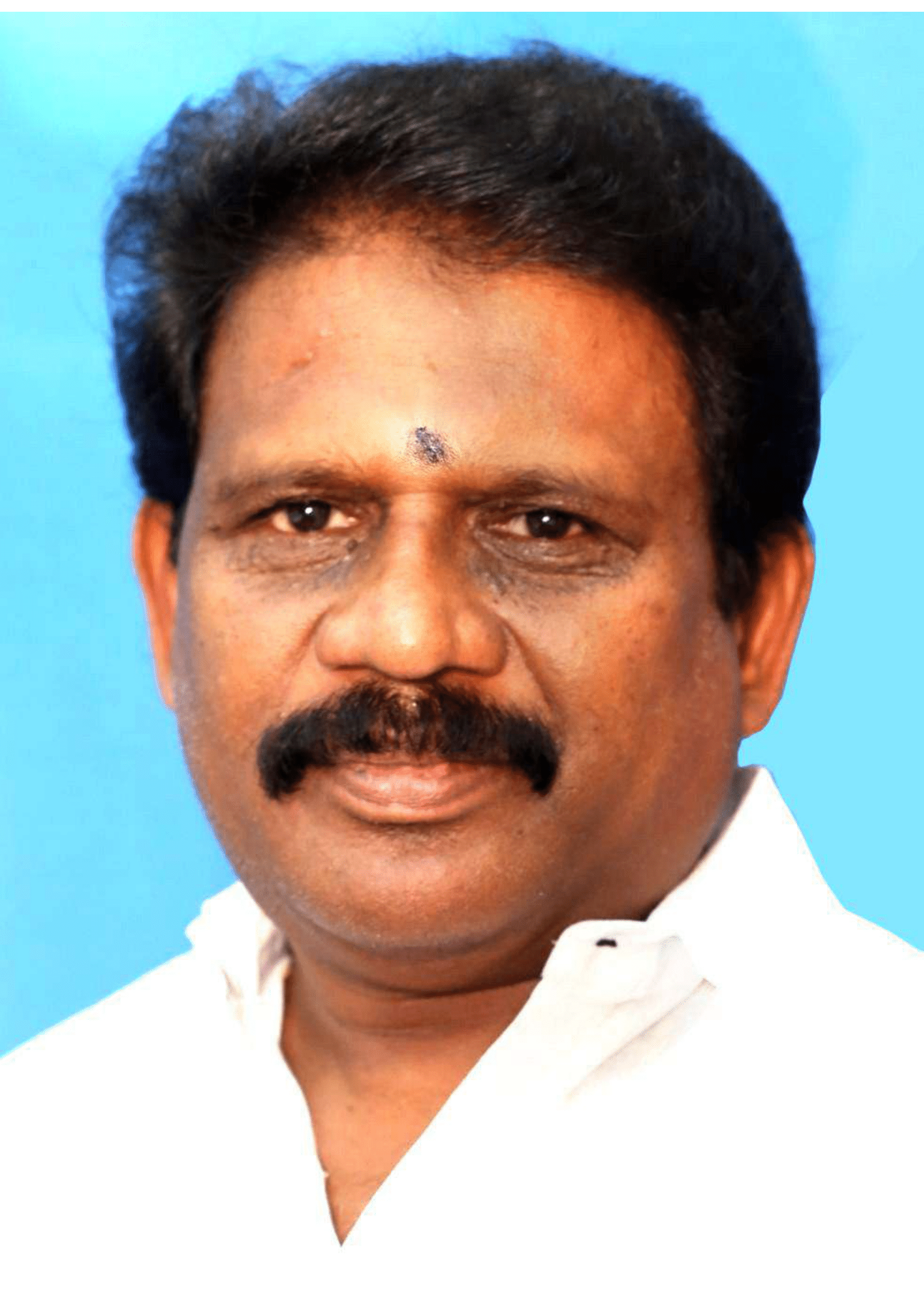

Member of Parliament, Lok Sabha
- In office 1 June 2009 – 18 May 2014
- Prime Minister: Manmohan Singh
- Preceded by: Position Established
- Succeeded by: J. Jayasingh Thiyagaraj Natterjee
- Constituency: Thoothukkudi

Chairperson – District Development Coordination and Monitoring Committee
- In office 1 June 2009 – 18 May 2014
- Preceded by: R. Dhanuskodi Athithan
- Succeeded by: J. Jayasingh Thiyagaraj Natterjee

Chairperson – Thoothukudi Airport Advisory Committee
- In office 1 June 2009 – 18 May 2014
- Preceded by: R. Dhanuskodi Athithan
- Succeeded by: J. Jayasingh Thiyagaraj Natterjee

Personal details
- Born: 19 March 1969 (age 57) Mangalapuram, Thoothukudi
- Citizenship: Indian
- Party: Dravida Munnetra Kazhagam
- Education: Bachelor of Naturopathy and Yogic Science. Bachelor of Science, Diploma in Varma & Massage (DVM), Post Graduate Diploma in Yoga and Naturopathy (PGDYN)
- Alma mater: The Tamil Nadu Dr. M.G.R. Medical University, Chennai; Pope's College, Sawyerpuram

S. R. Jeyadurai (born 19 March 1969) is an Indian politician belonging to the Dravida Munnetra Kazhagam party. He is a former member of Parliament, representing Thoothukkudi constituency in the Lok Sabha (the lower house of India's Parliament) from 2009 to 2014.

Jeyadurai was born in 1969, in Mangalapuram, Thoothukudi. He completed his B.N.Y.S. at Government Yoga and Naturopathy Medical College and Hospital, affiliated with The Tamil Nadu Dr. M.GR Medical University, Chennai. He holds a BSc degree, and is an alumnus of the pope's College Sawyerpuram, affiliated with Madurai Kamaraj University. He also completed his postGraduate diploma in yoga and naturopathy (PGDYN) from Dr.MG.R. Educational and Research Institute (a deemed university). and obtained a diploma in varma & massage (DVM) from Manonmaniam Sundaranar University. He got married in 1999, and has five daughters and one son. Currently he is living in Chennai.
