= G. Ragupathi =

Indian politician

G. Ragupathy

Member-Tamil Nadu Legislative Assembly
- In office 1985–1989
- Preceded by: N. A. Poongavanam
- Succeeded by: Durai Murugan
- Constituency: Katpadi

Personal details
- Born: 20 April 1937 Thondaiman Thulasi
- Party: All India Anna Dravida Munnetra Kazhagam
- Occupation: Politician

G. Ragupathy is an Indian politician and a former Member of the Tamil Nadu Legislative Assembly (MLA). Ragupathy contested and won the Katpadi Assembly constituency in the 1984 Tamil Nadu Legislative Assembly election on behalf of the All India Anna Dravida Munnetra Kazhagam (AIADMK) party.

== Electoral Performance ==
=== 1984 ===
1984 Tamil Nadu Legislative Assembly election: Katpadi
Party	Candidate	Votes	%	±%
AIADMK	G. Ragupathi	53,077	57.08%	New
DMK	Durai Murugan	36,839	39.62%	New
Independent	T. K. Somasundaram	1,195	1.29%	New
Independent	R. G. S. Mahalingam	983	1.06%	New
Independent	K. P. Santhanaraj	894	0.96%	New
Margin of victory		16,238	17.46%	9.78%
Turnout		92,988	75.73%	18.09%
Registered electors		127,249		
AIADMK gain from CPI		Swing	10.60%	
