= S. David Selvyn =

Indian politician

S. David Selvyn is an Indian politician and former Member of the Legislative Assembly. He was elected to the Tamil Nadu Legislative Assembly as a Dravida Munnetra Kazhagam candidate from Srivaikuntam constituency in the 1996 election.
