= Kanak Lata Singh =

Indian politician

MP of Rajya Sabha for Uttar Pradesh
- In office 14 December 2013 – 4 July 2016

Personal details
- Party: Samajwadi Party

Kanak Lata Singh (born Monday, 1 January 1962 in Village Jainagar, District Deoria (Uttar Pradesh)) is a politician from Samajwadi Party is a Member of the Parliament of India representing Uttar Pradesh in the Rajya Sabha, the upper house of the Indian Parliament.

She has studied M.A. (Ancient History) Lucknow University. She is daughter of Samajwadi Party Leader Late Mohan Singh.
