= K. R. Arjunan =

Indian politician

MP of Rajya Sabha for Tamil Nadu
- In office 25 July 2013 – 24 July 2019
- Constituency: Tamil Nadu

Personal details
- Born: 4 June 1961 (age 64) Ootacamund Tamil Nadu, India
- Party: AIADMK
- Spouse: Lalitha Arjunan
- Children: Rashmi Arjunan

K. R. Arjunan (born 1961 in Ooty) is an Indian politician. He was a former Member of Parliament, representing Tamil Nadu in the Rajya Sabha (the upper house of India's Parliament). K. R. Arjunan belongs to the All India Anna Dravida Munnetra Kazhagam (AIADMK) political party.

== See also ==
Rajya Sabha election in Tamil Nadu, 2013
