= S. G. Indira =

Indian politician

Smt S.G. Indira is an Indian politician from the All India Anna Dravida Munnetra Kazhagam party and a member of the Parliament of India representing Tamil Nadu in the Rajya Sabha.
