= A. Elavarasan =

Indian politician

A Elavarasan (born 7 June 1952, in Kuvagam, Ariyalur district, Tamil Nadu) is an Indian politician from the State of Tamil Nadu who belongs to the All India Anna Dravida Munnetra Kazhagam party.

He represented Tamil Nadu in Rajya Sabha for the term 2007–2013.
