= D. Selvaraj =

Indian politician

D. Selvaraj, also known as Oorvasi Selvaraj, was an Indian politician and was a Member of the Legislative Assembly (MLA).

Selvaraj was vice-president of the South Chennai branch of the Indian National Congress (INC) party from 1990 to 1997. He joined the Tamil Maanila Congress party when it was created by G. K. Moopanar and later became an INC member again.

Selvaraj was elected to the Tamil Nadu legislative assembly as an INC candidate from Srivaikuntam constituency in the 2006 election. At the time of his election, according to analysis of sworn affidavits, he was the third-richest MLA in the assembly, after the two main party leaders, Karunanidhi and Jayalalithaa.

== Personal life ==
Selvaraj was born in Maranthalai, Thoothukudi district. He was often referred to as Oorvasi Selvaraj, acknowledging the name of a low-price detergent product with which he was involved.

He died of a heart attack on 5 July 2009, aged 58. He was survived by his wife, two sons and a daughter.
