= B. S. Gnanadesikan =

Indian politician (1949–2021)

Member of Parliament - Rajya Sabha
- In office 25 July 2001 – 24 July 2013

Personal details
- Born: 20 January 1949 Srivilliputhur, Madras Province, India
- Died: 15 January 2021 (aged 71) Chennai, Tamil Nadu, India
- Party: Tamil Maanila Congress
- Spouse: G. Thilagavathi
- Children: Two sons (Vijay Gnanadesikan, Prashanth Gnanadesikan)
- Education: Loyola College, Chennai
- Website: Profile on Rajya Sabha

B. S. Gnanadesikan (20 January 1949 – 15 January 2021) was a Sr. Vice President of Tamil Maanila Congress(M) and a two time Member of the Parliament of India representing Tamil Nadu in the Rajya Sabha, the upper house of the Indian Parliament. Previously he was the President of the Tamil Nadu Congress Committee from 2011 to 2014.

He died at the age of 71 in Chennai due to COVID-19.

== Positions held ==
- Dec. 2014 - Jan 2021: Sr. Vice President of Tamil Maanila Congress(M)
- Sep. 2011 - Nov 2014: President, Tamil Nadu Congress Committee
- Aug. 2009 - July 2013: Member, Committee on Water Resources
- Dec. 2008 - July 2013: Member, Jawaharlal Institute of Post-Graduate Medical Education and Research, Pondicherry
- May 2008 - July 2013: Member, Committee on Papers Laid on the Table
- Jul. 2007 - Re-elected to Rajya Sabha
- Oct. 2004 - May 2009: Member, Consultative Committee for the Ministry of Home Affairs
- Sep. 2004 - May 2009: Member, Committee on Chemicals and Fertilizers
- Aug. 2004 - Sep. 2004: Member, Committee on Labor
- Aug. 2002 - Feb. 2004: Member, Consultative Committee for the Ministry of Finance
- Jan. 2002 - Feb. 2004: Member, Committee on Defense
- Jul. 2001 - Elected to Rajya Sabha
- 1996-2002 - General Secretary and Official Spokesperson, (i) Tamil Maanila Congress (Moopanar)
