= Durai Murugan =

Indian politician

- துரை முருகன்

Leader of the House, Tamil Nadu Legislative Assembly
- In office 11 May 2021 – 5 May 2026
- Governor: Banwarilal Purohit; R. N. Ravi
- Chief Minister: M. K. Stalin
- Preceded by: O. Panneerselvam
- Succeeded by: K. A. Sengottaiyan

Cabinet Minister Government of Tamil Nadu
- In office 8 May 2025 – 5 May 2026
- Minister: Irrigation
- Governor: Banwarilal Purohit; R. N. Ravi
- Chief Minister: M. K. Stalin
- In office 7 May 2021 – 5 May 2026
- Minister: Irrigation Projects including small Irrigation; Legislative Assembly; Governor and Ministry; Elections and Passports; Water Resources
- Governor: Banwarilal Purohit; R. N. Ravi
- Chief Minister: M. K. Stalin
- In office 7 May 2021 – 8 May 2025
- Minister: Minerals and Mines
- Governor: Banwarilal Purohit; R. N. Ravi
- Chief Minister: M. K. Stalin
- Succeeded by: S. Regupathy
- In office 12 July 2009 – 15 May 2011
- Minister: Law
- Chief Minister: M. Karunanidhi
- In office 13 May 2006 — 12 July 2009
- Minister: Public Works Department
- Chief Minister: M. Karunanidhi
- In office 13 May 1996 — 13 May 2001
- Minister: Public Works Department
- Chief Minister: M. Karunanidhi
- In office 27 January 1989 — 30 January 1991
- Minister: Public Works Department
- Chief Minister: M. Karunanidhi

4th General Secretary of the Dravida Munnetra Kazhagam
- Incumbent
- Assumed office 9 September 2020
- President: M. K. Stalin
- Preceded by: K. Anbazhagan

Treasurer of Dravida Munnetra Kazhagam
- In office 28 August 2018 – 3 September 2020
- President: M. K. Stalin
- General Secretary: K. Anbazhagan
- Preceded by: M. K. Stalin
- Succeeded by: T. R. Baalu

Principal Secretary of Dravida Munnetra Kazhagam
- In office 9 January 2015 – 27 August 2018
- President: M. Karunanidhi
- General Secretary: K. Anbazhagan
- Preceded by: Arcot N. Veeraswami
- Succeeded by: K. N. Nehru
- In office 2 June 2003 – 26 December 2008
- President: M. Karunanidhi
- General Secretary: K. Anbazhagan
- Preceded by: position established
- Succeeded by: Arcot N. Veeraswami

Deputy General Secretary of Dravida Munnetra Kazhagam
- In office 27 December 2008 – 8 January 2015
- President: M. Karunanidhi
- General Secretary: K. Anbazhagan
- Preceded by: M. K. Stalin
- Succeeded by: I. Periyasamy

Deputy Leader of the Opposition in the Tamil Nadu Legislative Assembly
- In office 4 June 2016 – 3 May 2021
- Leader of Opposition: M. K. Stalin
- Preceded by: Azhagappuram Mohan Raj
- Succeeded by: O. Pannerselvam
- In office 24 May 2001 – 14 April 2006
- Leader of Opposition: K. Anbazhagan
- Succeeded by: O. Pannerselvam
Legislative posts
Member of Tamil Nadu Legislative Assembly
In office 10 May 1996 – 4 May 2026
Preceded by	K. M. Kalaiselvi
Constituency	Katpadi
In office 6 February 1989 — 30 January 1991
Preceded by	G. Ragupathi
Succeeded by	K. M. Kalaiselvi
Constituency	Katpadi
In office 30 June 1977 —15 November 1984
Preceded by	K. A. Wahab
Succeeded by	M. Kadirvelu
Constituency	Ranipet
In office 15 March 1971 — 31 January 1976
Preceded by	G. Natarajan
Succeeded by	M. A. Jayavelu
Constituency	Katpadi

Personal details
- Born: 1 July 1938 (age 88) Gudiyatham, Madras Presidency, British India (now in Gudiyatham, Vellore District, Tamil Nadu, India)
- Party: Dravida Munnetra Kazhagam
- Spouse: Santhakumari
- Children: Kathir Anand (only son)

Durai Murugan (born 1 July 1938) is an Indian politician and lawyer from Tamil Nadu. He was Minister for Water Resources under the Government of Tamil Nadu (2021-2026) and has held ministerial posts in previous governments led by the DMK. He is the general secretary of the DMK since 9 September 2020. He graduated in MA and BL and is an advocate by profession. He is a very close confidant to former DMK Supremo M. Karunanidhi and his son DMK President M. K. Stalin. He also worked as Treasurer, Principal Secretary and Deputy General secretary of the DMK party.

Durai Murugan was first elected to the Tamil Nadu legislative assembly in 1971 and has been elected ten times since. He was elected from the Katpadi constituency in 2006. After the 2006 assembly elections, Durai Murugan was appointed Minister for Public Works in the Government of Tamil Nadu.

He was divested of the Public Works Department portfolio on 13 July 2009.

He was re-elected from the Katpadi constituency in the elections of 2016.

He currently resides in Kotturpuram, Chennai. He was born in 1938 in Gudiyatham, North Arcot, Madras Presidency (now Vellore District, Tamil Nadu) to Duraisamy and Thavasi Ammal. He belongs to the Vanniyar community, a numerically-large caste found throughout Northern Tamil Nadu. He is married to Santhakumari and has one son, Kathir Anand, who has served as the MP from Vellore since 2019.

== Elections contested and results ==
=== Tamil Nadu Legislative Assembly Elections ===
Year	Constituency	Party	Votes	%	Opponent	Opponent Party	Opponent Votes	%	Result	Margin	%
1971	Katpadi	DMK	37,487	57.79	Dhandayuthapani	INC(O)	20,919	32.25	Won	16,568	25.54
1977	Ranipet	DMK	31,940	43.53	Wahab K.A.	IND	16,643	22.68	Won	15,297	20.85
1980	Ranipet	DMK	44,318	53.70	Renu. N	AIADMK	37,064	44.91	Won	7,254	8.79
1984	Katpadi	DMK	36,839	39.62	G. Ragupathi	AIADMK	53,077	57.08	Lost	-16,238	-17.46
1989	Katpadi	DMK	43,181	43.41	Margabandu R	AIADMK	23,344	23.47	Won	19,837	19.94
1991	Katpadi	DMK	36,866	33.02	K.M. Kalaiselvi	AIADMK	63,005	56.43	Lost	-26,139	-23.41
1996	Katpadi	DMK	75,439	61.20	Pandurangan.K	AIADMK	34,432	27.93	Won	41,007	33.27
2001	Katpadi	DMK	64,187	49.47	Natarajan A.K.	PMK	56,185	43.30	Won	8,002	6.17
2006	Katpadi	DMK	86,824	57.45	Narayanan.B	AIADMK	51,677	34.19	Won	35,147	23.26
2011	Katpadi	DMK	75,064	49.55	Appu S.R.K	AIADMK	72,091	47.59	Won	2,973	1.96
2016	Katpadi	DMK	90,534	50.90	Appu S.R.K	AIADMK	66,588	37.44	Won	23,946	13.46
2021	Katpadi	DMK	85,140	46.18	V Ramu	AIADMK	84,394	45.78	Won	746	0.40
2026	Katpadi	DMK	62,225	30.63	Dr. M. Sudhakar	TVK	69,868	34.40	Lost	-7,643	-3.77
