= Ravikumar (writer) =

Indian politician

Duraisamy Ravikumar
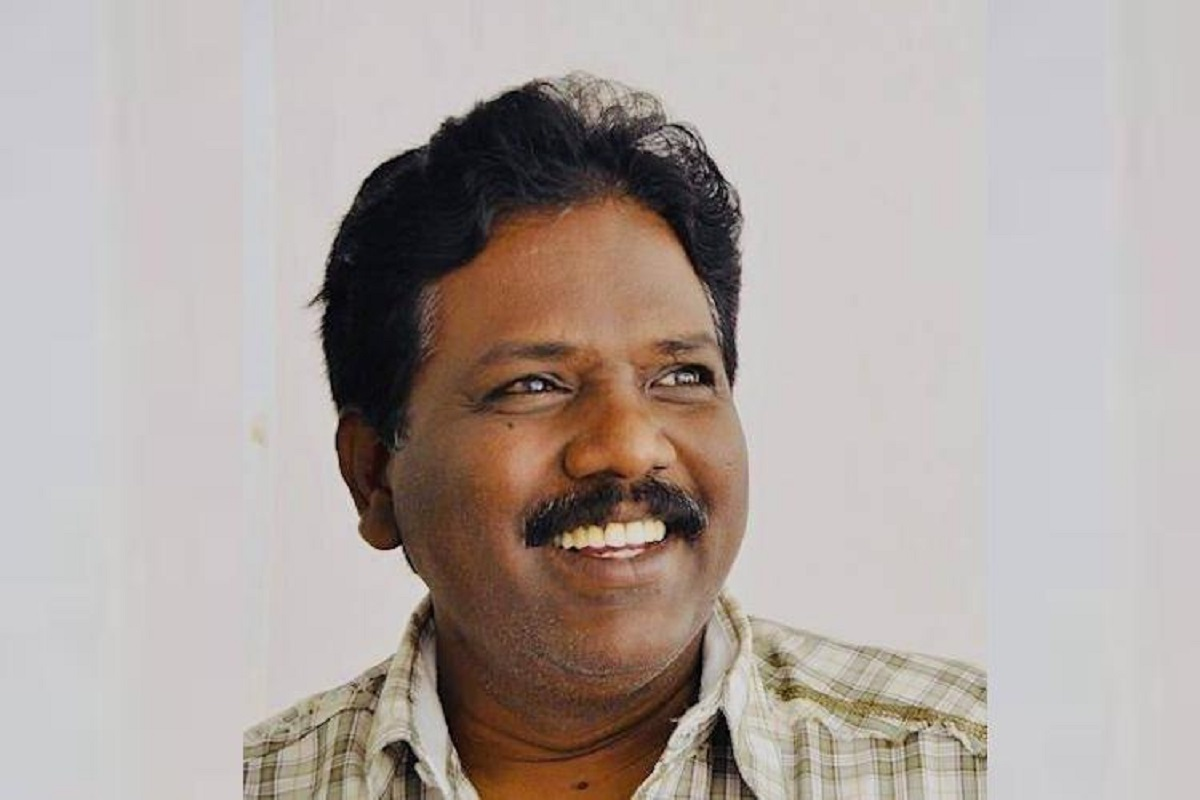
- Photo for Lok Sabha in 2019

Member of Parliament, Lok Sabha
- Incumbent
- Assumed office 23 May 2019
- Preceded by: S. Rajendran
- Constituency: Viluppuram

General Secretary Of Viduthalai Chiruthaigal Katchi
- Incumbent
- Assumed office 2010
- Preceded by: Thol. Thirumavalavan
- Succeeded by: Thol. Thirumavalavan

Member of Tamil Nadu Legislative Assembly
- In office 11 May 2006 – 13 May 2011
- Preceded by: P. Vallalperuman
- Succeeded by: N. Murugumaran
- Constituency: Kattumannarkoil, Cuddalore district

Personal details
- Born: 29 May 1961 (age 65) Manganampattu, Nagapattinam (now Mayiladuthurai district), Tamil Nadu, India
- Party: VCK
- Spouse: R. Senbagavalli
- Parents: V. Duraisamy (father); D. Kanagammal (mother)
- Education: LL.B., Tamil University; M.A., Ph.D, Annamalai University
- Occupation: VCK General Secretary

Duraisamy Ravikumar, popularly known as D. Ravikumar (born 29 May 1961), is an Indian Tamil intellectual, writer, lawyer, politician and an anti-caste activist. He was the editor of the magazine, Nirapirikai. Nirapirikai inspired several new writers in the 1990s in Tamil Nadu. He is an Ambedkarite and Buddhist. Ravikumar is the current Member of Parliament in the Lok Sabha from Viluppuram and member of the Viduthalai Chiruthaigal Katchi.

== Career ==
Ravikumar is the founder of the anti-caste publishing house Navayana, along with S. Anand, and the former president of the People's Education Movement (Makkal Kalvi Eyakkam) and PUCL (Tamil Nadu and Pondicherry).

Ravikumar was elected to the Tamil Nadu Legislative Assembly from Kattumannarkoil, Cuddalore district, and served from 2006 to 2011. He was instrumental in bringing a new policy to handle EWaste in Tamil Nadu. The Tamil Nadu government started a skill development program and Kalaignar M. Karunanidhi, then Chief Minister of Tamil Nadu, created six welfare boards, both at the request of Ravikumar.

In 2010, Ravikumar won the Aringar Anna Award, conferred by the Tamil Nadu Government. Vikatan Awards for Translation ( 2014) Thiranayvu chemmal award for literary criticism (2019) manonmaniam Sundaranar University, Bharathi Award (2019) Vitiyal Trust Chennai.

== Writings ==
=== Books ===
- Ravikumar, D. (2009). Venomous touch : notes on caste, culture, and politics. Translated by R. Azhagarasan. Stree-Samya Publications. ISBN 978-8185604763.

=== Prose ===
- "Kankanippin Arasiyal" (1995) Vidiyal Pathippagam
- "Kothippu Uyarndu Varum" (2001) Kalachuvadu
- "Kadakka Mudiyatha Nizhal" (2003) Kalachuvadu
- "Malcolm X" (2003) Kalachuvadu
- "Sonnal Mudiyum" (2007) Vikatan Publication
- "Indrum Namadhe" (2008) Vikatan Publication
- "Thuyarathin mel patiyum Thuyaram" (2009) Aazhi Publication
- "Thamizharay Unarum Tharunam" (2010) Aazhi Publication
- "Kaana Mutiyaa Kanavu" (2010) Aazhi Publication
- "Bob Marley" (2010) Uyirmai Publication
- "Andai Ayal Ulakam" (2010) Uyirmai Publication
- "Piravazhip payanam" (2010) Uyirmai Publication
- "Katranaiththoorum" (2010) Uyirmai Publication
- "Soolakam" (2010) Uyirmai Publication
- "Meelum Varalaru" (2010) Ulakath Thamizaraychi niruvanam
- "Kumbatchiyilirunthu kodungonmaikku" (2017) Kizhakku Pathipakam
- "Kaalathai Thorkaditha Kalaingar" (2017) Manarkeni

Kaanalaay marum kaveri (2018) Manarkeni Ayiram Pookkal Karukattum (2019) Manarkeni

=== Poetry ===
- "Avizhum Sorkal" (2009) Uyirmai
- "Mazhai Maram" (2009) CreA
- "Vaanil Vitterintha Kanavu" (2017) Manarkeni

=== Short stories ===
- "Kadal Kinaru" (2014) Manarkeni

=== Translations ===
- Uraiyadal Thodarkiradu (1995) (interviews and articles of philosophers including Michel Foucault, Edward Said) Vidiyal Pathipakam
- Choli ke peche (2010) (short stories of women writers including Mahasweta Devi, Ismat Chuktai, Isabelle Allende) Aazhi
- Velichamum Thanneer Mathiritan (2003) (short stories of Gabriel García Márquez and others) Dalit Veliyeedu
- Athikarathitam Unmaiyaip Pesuthal (2010) (writings of Edward Said) Manarkeni
- Varalaru Ennum Kathai (2010) (writings of Eduardo Galeano) Manarkeni
- Valasaip Paravai (2010) (poems of Yehuda Amichai, Maya Angelou, Ethelbert Miller, Joy Goswami and others) Manarkeni

=== Editing ===
==== Tamil ====
- Dalit Literature, Politics, Culture (1996)
- Dalit Engira Thanitthuvum (1998) Dalit Publication
- Iyothee Thaas Panditar Cintanaikal (four volumes) (1999) Dalit Sahitya Academy
- Rettaimalai Srinivasan Jeevida Carithira Curukkam (1999) (Autobiography) Dalit Sahitya Academy
- Mikai Naadum Kalai (2003) (Essays on cinema) kalachuvadu
- Dalit journal
- Bodhi journal
- Manarkeni journal

==== English ====
- We, the Condemned (1999) (Against Death Penalty) PUCL, Pondicherry
- Ravikumar; Azhagarasan, R., eds. (2012). The Oxford India anthology of Tamil Dalit writing (1st ed.). Oxford University Press. ISBN 978-0-19-807938-5.
