= Tittakudi Assembly constituency =

One of the 234 State Legislative Assembly Constituencies in Tamil Nadu

Coordinates: 11.41°N 79.12°E

Tittakudi
- Constituency No. 151 for the Tamil Nadu Legislative Assembly

Constituency details
- Country: India
- Region: South India
- State: Tamil Nadu
- District: Cuddalore
- Lok Sabha constituency: Cuddalore
- Established: 2008
- Total electors: 2,09,006
- Reservation: SC

Member of Legislative Assembly
- 17th Tamil Nadu Legislative Assembly
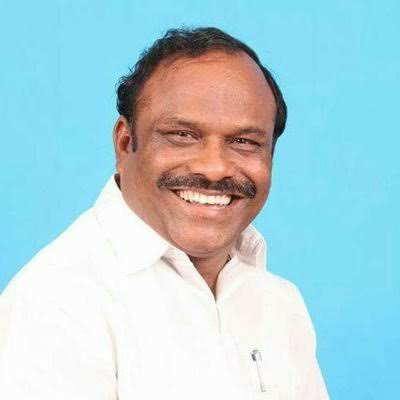
- Incumbent Ganesan C.V
- Party: DMK
- Alliance: SPA
- Elected year: 2026

Tittakudi is a state assembly constituency in Tamil Nadu, India, newly formed after constituency delimitations in 2008. It is included in Cuddalore Lok Sabha constituency. Mangalore (SC) legislative assembly changed in 2008. It is one of the 234 State Legislative Assembly Constituencies in Tamil Nadu.

== Members of Legislative Assembly ==
Year	Winner	Party
2011	K. Tamil Azhagan	Desiya Murpokku Dravida Kazhagam
2016	C. V. Ganesan	Dravida Munnetra Kazhagam
2021	C. V. Ganesan	Dravida Munnetra Kazhagam
2026	C. V. Ganesan	Dravida Munnetra Kazhagam

== Election results ==
Vote share of winning candidates
2026	35.91%
2021	50.08%
2016	40.67%
2011	44.45%

=== 2026 ===
2026 Tamil Nadu Legislative Assembly election: Tittakudi
Party	Candidate	Votes	%	±%
DMK	Ganesan C.V	63,106	35.91	▼14.17
TVK	Rajasekar A	60,477	34.41	New
AIADMK	Murugumaran N	42,502	24.18	New
NTK	Mahalakshmi V	5,709	3.25	▼3.08
NOTA	NOTA	584	0.33	▼0.27
Independent	Velmurugan G	549	0.31	New
All India Puratchi Thalaivar Makkal Munnetra Kazhagam	Palanivel R	443	0.25	New
Independent	Murugan A	401	0.23	New
BSP	Ravichandran K.P	399	0.23	New
Aanaithinthiya Jananayaka Pathukappu Kazhagam	Sathya M	362	0.21	New
TVK	Jaya K	338	0.19	New
Independent	Perinbam D	315	0.18	New
Independent	Silambarasan J	275	0.16	New
Bahujan Dravida Party	Jayaraman N	158	0.09	New
Independent	Padmanathan V	136	0.08	New
Margin of victory		2,629	1.50	▼11.40
Turnout		1,75,754	84.09	▲7.89
Registered electors		2,09,006		▼10,384
DMK hold		Swing	▼14.17	

=== 2021 ===
2021 Tamil Nadu Legislative Assembly election: Tittakudi
Party	Candidate	Votes	%	±%
DMK	C. V. Ganesan	83,726	50.08%	+9.41
BJP	D. Periyasamy	62,163	37.18%	New
NTK	N. Kamatchi	10,591	6.33%	New
DMDK	R. Umanath	4,142	2.48%	−6.67
MNM	R. Prabakaran	1,745	1.04%	New
Independent	M. Natarajan	1,063	0.64%	New
NOTA	NOTA	999	0.60%	−0.62
Independent	M. Karuppan	944	0.56%	New
Margin of victory		21,563	12.90%	11.52%
Turnout		167,185	76.20%	−1.52%
Rejected ballots		166	0.10%	
Registered electors		219,390		
DMK hold		Swing	9.41%	

=== 2016 ===
2016 Tamil Nadu Legislative Assembly election: Tittakudi
Party	Candidate	Votes	%	±%
DMK	C. V. Ganesan	65,139	40.67%	New
AIADMK	P. Ayyasamy	62,927	39.29%	New
DMDK	S. Sasi Kumar	14,657	9.15%	−35.3
PMK	E. Archunan	11,438	7.14%	New
NOTA	NOTA	1,957	1.22%	New
Independent	A. Vedhamanikkam	1,015	0.63%	New
Margin of victory		2,212	1.38%	−7.70%
Turnout		160,176	77.72%	−1.52%
Registered electors		206,089		
DMK gain from DMDK		Swing	-3.78%	

=== 2011 ===
2011 Tamil Nadu Legislative Assembly election: Tittakudi
Party	Candidate	Votes	%	±%
DMDK	K. Tamil Azhagan	61,897	44.45%	New
VCK	M. Sinthanai Selvan	49,255	35.37%	New
Independent	P. Palaniammal	8,577	6.16%	New
Independent	C. Ulaganathan	5,637	4.05%	New
JMM	T. Elangovan	4,312	3.10%	New
IJK	J. Kalaiyarasan	3,486	2.50%	New
Independent	K. Muthukumaran	2,131	1.53%	New
Independent	A. Suman	1,885	1.35%	New
BSP	M. Thangamani	1,245	0.89%	New
Independent	V. Dhanasekar	836	0.60%	New
Margin of victory		12,642	9.08%	
Turnout		139,261	79.24%	
Registered electors		175,752		
DMDK win (new seat)				
