= C. V. Ganesan =

Indian politician

Honourable C. V. Ganesan
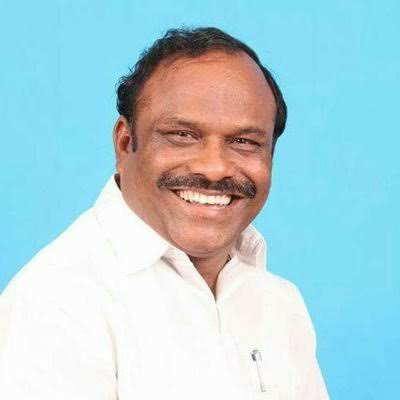

Cabinet Minister Government of Tamil Nadu
- In office 7 May 2021 – 5 May 2026
- Minister: Labour Welfare; Skill Development
- Governor: Banwarilal Purohit; R. N. Ravi
- Chief Minister: M. K. Stalin

Member of the Tamil Nadu Legislative Assembly
- Incumbent
- Assumed office 20 May 2016
- Preceded by: K. Tamil Azhagan
- Constituency: Tittakudi
- In office 16 May 2004 – 11 May 2006
- Preceded by: Thol. Thirumavalavan
- Succeeded by: K. Selvaperunthagai
- Constituency: Mangalore
- In office 27 January 1989 – 30 January 1991
- Preceded by: S. Thangaraju
- Succeeded by: S. Puratchimani
- Constituency: Mangalore

Member of Parliament, Lok Sabha
- In office 15 May 1996 – 10 March 1998
- Preceded by: P. Vallalperuman
- Succeeded by: Dalit Ezhilmalai
- Constituency: Chidambaram

Personal details
- Born: 16 June 1959 (age 67) Kaludur, Madras State (now Tamil Nadu), India
- Party: Dravida Munnetra Kazhagam
- Spouse: G. Bhavani (m. 1984; died 2021)
- Children: 1 son 4 daughters
- Education: M.A., B.Ed.
- Alma mater: University of Madras; Annamalai University

C. Venkattan Ganesan is an Indian politician from the Dravida Munnetra Kazhagam (DMK). He was elected twice (2016 and 2021) as a member of the Tamil Nadu Legislative Assembly from Tittakudi. Since May 2021, he is serving as Tamil Nadu's Minister for Labour Welfare and Skill Development.

== Early life ==
Ganesan was born to P. Venkattan on 16 June 1959 in Kaludur (a village now in Cuddalore district).

== Education ==
Ganesan obtained his undergraduate degree from Muthurangam Government Arts College (Vellore). He also got a Bachelor of Laws (BL) degree from Government Law College, Tiruchirapalli, and a Diploma in Cooperative management (D.Coop) from Swamiyappa Co-operative Institute, Vellore.

In May 1984, he got Master of Arts degree from the University of Madras. In December 1986, he got his Bachelor of Education (B.Ed) from Annamalai University (Chidambaram, Cuddalore district).

== Politics ==
=== Party posts ===
He has been associated with the DMK since around 1984, and was an active Member of the party's Youth Wing.

=== Elections contested ===
Election	Constituency	Party	Result	Vote %	Runner-up	Runner-up Party	Runner-up vote %
2021 Tamil Nadu Legislative Assembly election	Tittakudi	DMK	Won	50.08	D. Periyasamy	BJP	37.18
2016 Tamil Nadu Legislative Assembly election	Tittakudi	DMK	Won	40.67	P. Ayyasamy	ADMK	39.29

=== Ministership (2021-) ===
On 6 September 2021, Ganesan tabled the right to sit amendment to the Tamil Nadu Shops and Establishments Act, 1947.

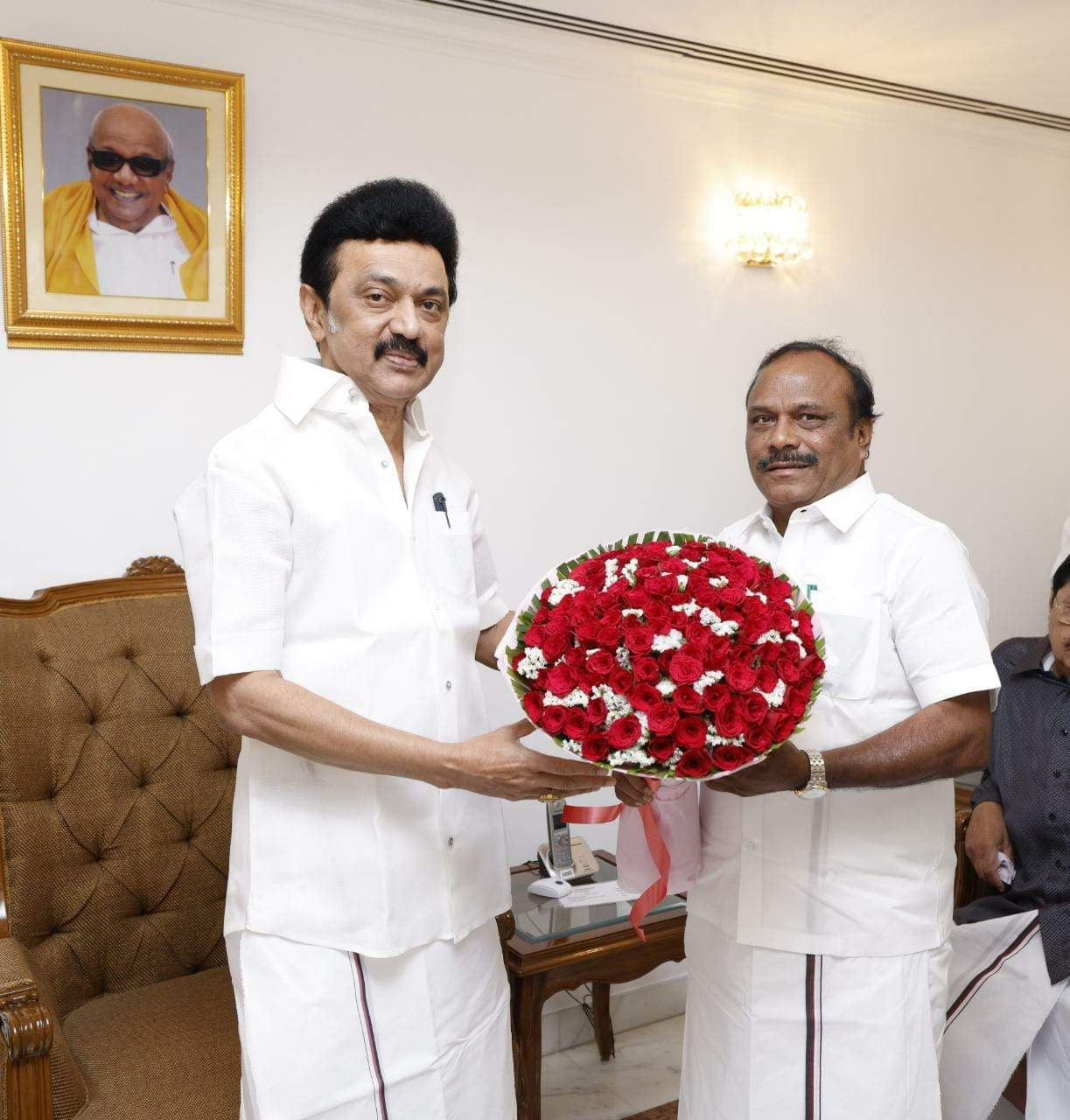

== Personal life ==
Ganesan married G. Bavani on 10 June 1984. The couple had one son and four daughters. Bavani died on 9 December 2021.
