= R. T. Arasu =

Indian politician

Member of the Legislative Assembly-Tamil Nadu.
- In office 2016–2021
- Preceded by: V. S. Raji
- Succeeded by: M. Babu
- Constituency: Cheyyur

Personal details
- Born: 4 May 1967 Irumbedu
- Party: Dravida Munnetra Kazhagam
- Profession: Dentist

R. T. Arasu is an Indian politician and a former Member of the Legislative Assembly (MLA) of Tamil Nadu. He hails from Irumbedu village in Kanchipuram district. A holder of a bachelor's degree in Dental Surgery (BDS), Arasu belongs to the Dravida Munnetra Kazhagam (DMK) party. In the 2016 Tamil Nadu Legislative Assembly elections, he contested from the Cheyyur Assembly constituency and was elected as a Member of the Legislative Assembly.

== Electoral performance ==
Election	Constituency	Political party	Result	Vote %	Opposition			Ref
Election	Constituency	Political party	Result	Vote %	Candidate	Political party	Vote %	Ref
2016	Cheyyur	DMK	Won	37.51%	A. Munusamy	AIADMK	37.33%	
