= M. Sinthanai Selvan =

Indian politician

Sinthanai Selvan

Member of the Tamil Nadu Legislative Assembly
- In office 12 May 2021 – 6 May 2026
- Preceded by: N. Murugumaran
- Succeeded by: L. E. Jothimani
- Constituency: Kattumannarkoil

Personal details
- Born: 12 December 1966 (age 59) South Arcot District, Madras State, India
- Party: Viduthalai Chiruthaigal Katchi

Mahimainathan Sinthanai Selvan is an Indian politician who is a Member of the Tamil Nadu Legislative Assembly. He was elected from Kattumannarkoil as a Viduthalai Chiruthaigal Katchi candidate in 2021.

== Biography ==
Sinthanai Selvan was born to A. Mahimainathan on 12 December 1966.

He got his Secondary School Leaving Certificate (SSLC) from Government Higher Secondary School, Rishivandiyam in March 1981.

In April 1984, he obtained a Diploma in Mechanical engineering (DME) at Thanthai Periyar EVR Government Polytechnic College, Vellore.

Before entering politics, he worked as an Executive Engineer at Neyveli Lignite Corporation India Limited (NLCIL) from February 1989 to April 2006.

He is married to Thangam. The couple has two sons.

== Electoral performance ==
| Election | Constituency | Political party | Result | Vote % | Opposition | | | Ref |
| Election | Constituency | Political party | Result | Vote % | Candidate | Political party | Vote % | Ref |
|---|---|---|---|---|---|---|---|---|
| 2021 | Kattumannarkoil | VCK | Won | 49.20% | N. Murugumaran | AIADMK | 43.16% | |
| 2026 | Cheyyur | VCK | Lost | 30.87% | E. Rajasekar | AIADMK | 34.02% | |
