= Dalit Ezhilmalai =

Indian politician (1945–2020)

Member of Parliament, Lok Sabha
- In office 13 May 2001 – 16 May 2004
- Political Party: All India Anna Dravida Munnetra Kazhagam
- Preceded by: Rangarajan Kumaramangalam
- Succeeded by: L. Ganesan
- Constituency: Tiruchirappalli
- In office 10 March 1998 – 26 April 1999
- Political Party: Pattali Makkal Katchi
- Preceded by: C. V. Ganesan
- Succeeded by: E. Ponnuswamy
- Constituency: Chidambaram

Personal details
- Born: 24 June 1945 Chengalpattu, Tamil Nadu, India
- Died: 6 May 2020 (aged 74) Chennai, India
- Party: PMK; AIADMK

Military service
- Branch/service: Indian Army
- Battles/wars: Indo-Pakistani War of 1971

Dalit Ezhilmalai (24 June 1945 – 6 May 2020) was an Indian union minister. He was a leader of the Pattali Makkal Katchi (PMK), and was Union Minister of State, Health and Family Welfare (Independent Charge) during the Atal Bihari Vajpayee government in 1998–99.

== Early life ==
He was born on 24 June 1945 in Irumbedu village in Madurantakam taluk of Chengalpattu district in Tamil Nadu. He served the erstwhile Post & Telegraph Department between 1963 and 1987. During this period, he was sent on deputation to the Army for five years up to 1974. As an army officer he took part in the Indo-Pakistani War of 1971. He was a recipient of the K Sainik Seva Medal from the president of India for meritorious service in the Indian Army. Even while in the government service, he held key positions in the National Federation of Postal Union and Scheduled Castes and Scheduled Tribes Employees Association Co-ordination Committee, Tamil Nadu and Puducherry, besides launching the Dalit People's Front in 1980.

== Career ==
After the formation of the Pattali Makkal Katchi in 1989, he joined the party and became its general secretary. In the 1998 Lok Sabha election, he was elected from the Chidambaram (reserved) constituency when the PMK contested the poll as part of the AIADMK-led coalition. In March 1998, he was made Union Minister of State for Health and Family Welfare with independent charge in the Vajpayee Cabinet. However, in August 1999, he quit the PMK as he was denied the party nomination to contest again from the constituency. Later, he joined the AIADMK and was elected as an AIADMK MP from Tiruchirappalli (Lok Sabha constituency) in the 2001 by-election.

== Electoral performance ==
2001 Byelection: Tiruchirappalli
Party	Candidate	Votes	%	±%
AIADMK	Dalit Ezhilmalai	343,874	48.38	
BJP	M. N. Sukumar	3,26,461	45.93	−8.68
Independent	P. Ravi	16,417	2.31	
Independent	G. Hariharan	6,053	0.82	
Margin of victory		17,413	2.45	−8.64
Turnout		7,10,830	58.03	1.63
Registered electors		12,24,893		−1.69
AIADMK gain from BJP		Swing	-6.23	

1998 Indian general election: Chidambaram
Party	Candidate	Votes	%	±%
PMK	R. Ezhilmalai	305,372	45.81%	22.65%
DMK	C. V. Ganesan	2,97,417	44.62%	−4.07%
INC	P. Vallalperuman	43,214	6.48%	−14.44%
BSP	P. Nagappan	19,922	2.99%	
Margin of victory		7,955	1.19%	−24.34%
Turnout		6,66,594	64.87%	−5.82%
Registered electors		10,54,642		2.73%
PMK gain from DMK		Swing	-2.88%	

== Death ==
He died on 6 May 2020, aged 74, in Chennai.
