= Kattumannarkoil Assembly constituency =

One of the 234 State Legislative Assembly Constituencies in Tamil Nadu, in India

Coordinates: 11.2727°N 79.5555°E

Kattumannarkoil
- Constituency No. 159 for the Tamil Nadu Legislative Assembly

Constituency details
- Country: India
- Region: South India
- State: Tamil Nadu
- District: Cuddalore
- Lok Sabha constituency: Chidambaram
- Established: 1962
- Total electors: 2,26,509
- Reservation: SC

Member of Legislative Assembly
- 17th Tamil Nadu Legislative Assembly
- Incumbent L. E. Jothimani
- Party: VCK
- Alliance: TVK+
- Elected year: 2026

Kattumannarkoil is a legislative assembly in Cuddalore district, which includes the city of Kattumannarkoil. It is a part of Chidambaram Lok Sabha constituency. It is one of the 234 State Legislative Assembly Constituencies in Tamil Nadu, in India.

== Members of Legislative Assembly ==
Year	Member	Party
Madras State
1962	M. R. Krishnamoorthi	Dravida Munnetra Kazhagam
1967	S. Sivasubramanian	Indian National Congress
Tamil Nadu
1971	S. Perumal	Dravida Munnetra Kazhagam
1977	E. Ramalingam	Dravida Munnetra Kazhagam
1980	E. Ramalingam	Dravida Munnetra Kazhagam
1984	S. Jayachandran	Indian National Congress
1989	A. Thangaraju	Independent
1991	N. R. Rajendiran	All India Anna Dravida Munnetra Kazhagam
1996	E. Ramalingam	Dravida Munnetra Kazhagam
2001	P. Vallalperuman	Dravida Munnetra Kazhagam
2006	D. Ravikumar	Viduthalai Chiruthaigal Katchi
2011	N. Murugumaran	All India Anna Dravida Munnetra Kazhagam
2016	N. Murugumaran	All India Anna Dravida Munnetra Kazhagam
2021	Sinthanai Selvan	Viduthalai Chiruthaigal Katchi
2026	L. E. Jothimani	Viduthalai Chiruthaigal Katchi

== Election results ==
Vote share of winning candidates
2026	45.33%
2021	49.20%
2016	29.33%
2011	57.79%
2006	51.46%
2001	55.37%
1996	45.83%
1991	52.11%
1989	39.41%
1984	50.67%
1980	59.46%
1977	37.54%
1971	51.72%
1967	48.34%
1962	47.14%

=== 2026 ===
2026 Tamil Nadu Legislative Assembly election: Kattumannarkoil
Party	Candidate	Votes	%	±%
VCK	L. E. Jothimani	85,179	45.33	▼3.87
PMK	A. Sozhan	52,116	27.74	New
TVK	S. Seenuvasan	43,156	22.97	New
NTK	M. Sivajothi	4,563	2.43	▼1.46
TVK	M. Alavanthar	563	0.30	New
Independent	S. Sankarkumar	509	0.27	New
NOTA	NOTA	465	0.25	
Margin of victory		33,063	17.59	▲11.55
Turnout		1,87,905	82.96	▲6.56
Registered electors		2,26,509		▼2,447
VCK hold		Swing	▼3.87	

=== 2021 ===
2021 Tamil Nadu Legislative Assembly election: Kattumannarkoil
Party	Candidate	Votes	%	±%
VCK	Sinthanai Selvan	86,056	49.20%	+19.87
AIADMK	N. Murugumaran	75,491	43.16%	+13.83
NTK	P. Nivedha	6,806	3.89%	+3.25
AMMK	S. Narayanamoorthy	1,904	1.09%	New
MNM	Thanga Vikram	1,415	0.81%	New
Independent	A. Anandan	991	0.57%	New
Margin of victory		10,565	6.04%	5.99%
Turnout		174,913	76.40%	−1.50%
Rejected ballots		96	0.05%	
Registered electors		228,956		
VCK gain from AIADMK		Swing	19.87%	

=== 2016 ===
2016 Tamil Nadu Legislative Assembly election: Kattumannarkoil
Party	Candidate	Votes	%	±%
AIADMK	N. Murugumaran	48,450	29.33%	−28.46
VCK	Thol. Thirumavalavan	48,363	29.28%	New
INC	Dr. K. I. Manirathinem	37,346	22.61%	New
PMK	Dr. Anbu Cholan	25,890	15.67%	New
Independent	K. Anbalagan	1,360	0.82%	New
NTK	E. Jayasri	1,055	0.64%	New
NOTA	NOTA	1,025	0.62%	New
Margin of victory		87	0.05%	−21.86%
Turnout		165,186	77.90%	−1.62%
Registered electors		212,053		
AIADMK hold		Swing	-28.46%	

=== 2011 ===
2011 Tamil Nadu Legislative Assembly election: Kattumannarkoil
Party	Candidate	Votes	%	±%
AIADMK	N. Murugumaran	83,665	57.79%	New
VCK	D. Ravikumar	51,940	35.88%	New
Independent	L. E. Nandhakumar	2,330	1.61%	New
Puratchi Bharatham	P. K. Bakkiyaraj	1,969	1.36%	New
Independent	M. Muruganandam	1,665	1.15%	New
BSP	K. Bharathidasan	1,246	0.86%	New
Independent	P. Azhahiri	1,012	0.70%	New
IJK	B. Mohanambal	946	0.65%	New
Margin of victory		31,725	21.91%	9.86%
Turnout		144,773	79.52%	6.69%
Registered electors		182,058		
AIADMK gain from VCK		Swing	6.33%	

=== 2006 ===
2006 Tamil Nadu Legislative Assembly election: Kattumannarkoil
Party	Candidate	Votes	%	±%
VCK	D. Ravikumar	57,244	51.46%	New
INC	P. Vallalperuman	43,830	39.40%	+0.53
DMDK	R. Umanath	6,556	5.89%	New
AIVP	S. Sellakkannu	902	0.81%	New
Independent	P. Vetrikumar	843	0.76%	New
BJP	A. Vasanthakumar	818	0.74%	New
Margin of victory		13,414	12.06%	−4.44%
Turnout		111,245	72.83%	10.17%
Registered electors		152,743		
VCK gain from DMK		Swing	-3.91%	

=== 2001 ===
2001 Tamil Nadu Legislative Assembly election: Kattumannarkoil
Party	Candidate	Votes	%	±%
DMK	P. Vallalperuman	55,444	55.37%	+9.53
INC	R. Sachithanandam	38,927	38.87%	New
MDMK	R. Paranthaman	1,674	1.67%	−0.75
Thaayaga Makkal Katchi	K. S. Manickam	1,168	1.17%	New
JD(S)	S. Asokan	1,085	1.08%	New
Independent	L. R. Visvanathan	1,080	1.08%	New
Margin of victory		16,517	16.49%	6.91%
Turnout		100,139	62.66%	−9.38%
Registered electors		159,810		
DMK hold		Swing	9.53%	

=== 1996 ===
1996 Tamil Nadu Legislative Assembly election: Kattumannarkoil
Party	Candidate	Votes	%	±%
DMK	E. Ramalingam	46,978	45.83%	+23.37
HRPI	L. Elayaperumal	37,159	36.25%	New
AIADMK	R. Kousalya	15,320	14.95%	−37.16
MDMK	Kanagasabai Muthu	2,481	2.42%	New
Margin of victory		9,819	9.58%	−18.93%
Turnout		102,498	72.05%	2.29%
Registered electors		148,333		
DMK gain from AIADMK		Swing	-6.28%	

=== 1991 ===
1991 Tamil Nadu Legislative Assembly election: Kattumannarkoil
Party	Candidate	Votes	%	±%
AIADMK	N. R. Rajendiran	48,103	52.11%	+46.13
PMK	G. Vetriveeran	21,785	23.60%	New
DMK	E. Ramalingam	20,740	22.47%	−12.04
JP	M. Renganathan	996	1.08%	New
Margin of victory		26,318	28.51%	23.61%
Turnout		92,311	69.76%	5.12%
Registered electors		136,540		
AIADMK gain from Independent		Swing	12.70%	

=== 1989 ===
1989 Tamil Nadu Legislative Assembly election: Kattumannarkoil
Party	Candidate	Votes	%	±%
Independent	A. Thangarasu	30,877	39.41%	New
DMK	E. Ramalingam	27,036	34.50%	−14.83
INC	S. Jayachandran	10,156	12.96%	−37.71
AIADMK	S. Samidurai	4,683	5.98%	New
AIADMK	M. Nagarajan	4,566	5.83%	New
Margin of victory		3,841	4.90%	3.57%
Turnout		78,356	64.64%	−15.06%
Registered electors		123,447		
Independent gain from INC		Swing	-11.26%	

=== 1984 ===
1984 Tamil Nadu Legislative Assembly election: Kattumannarkoil
Party	Candidate	Votes	%	±%
INC	S. Jayachandran	42,928	50.67%	New
DMK	K. P. Thangaswamy	41,796	49.33%	−10.13
Margin of victory		1,132	1.34%	−18.47%
Turnout		84,724	79.70%	8.76%
Registered electors		109,718		
INC gain from DMK		Swing	-8.79%	

=== 1980 ===
1980 Tamil Nadu Legislative Assembly election: Kattumannarkoil
Party	Candidate	Votes	%	±%
DMK	E. Ramalingam	44,012	59.46%	+21.92
CPI(M)	P. S. Mahalingam	29,350	39.65%	New
Independent	M. R. Rajan	660	0.89%	New
Margin of victory		14,662	19.81%	11.09%
Turnout		74,022	70.93%	3.98%
Registered electors		105,613		
DMK hold		Swing	21.92%	

=== 1977 ===
1977 Tamil Nadu Legislative Assembly election: Kattumannarkoil
Party	Candidate	Votes	%	±%
DMK	E. Ramalingam	26,038	37.54%	−14.18
AIADMK	R. Rajan	19,991	28.82%	New
INC	S. Sivasubramanian	18,158	26.18%	−20.35
JP	P. Ayyankutti	3,736	5.39%	New
Independent	T. Thiagarajan	595	0.86%	New
Independent	P. A. Samidurai	489	0.70%	New
Independent	G. Pichamuthu	355	0.51%	New
Margin of victory		6,047	8.72%	3.53%
Turnout		69,362	66.95%	−11.54%
Registered electors		104,851		
DMK hold		Swing	-14.18%	

=== 1971 ===
1971 Tamil Nadu Legislative Assembly election: Kattumannarkoil
Party	Candidate	Votes	%	±%
DMK	S. Perumal	32,847	51.72%	+3.59
INC	T. M. Kuppusami	29,551	46.53%	−1.81
Independent	K. Jaganathan	1,110	1.75%	New
Margin of victory		3,296	5.19%	4.98%
Turnout		63,508	78.49%	−3.54%
Registered electors		83,360		
DMK gain from INC		Swing	3.38%	

=== 1967 ===
1967 Madras Legislative Assembly election: Kattumannarkoil
Party	Candidate	Votes	%	±%
INC	S. Sivasubramanian	30,521	48.34%	+1.39
DMK	C. Govindarasu	30,387	48.13%	+0.99
Independent	A. Samidurai	1,561	2.47%	New
Independent	C. Kaliamoorthy	349	0.55%	New
Independent	S. Chinnayya	320	0.51%	New
Margin of victory		134	0.21%	0.03%
Turnout		63,138	82.03%	4.30%
Registered electors		79,560		
INC gain from DMK		Swing	1.20%	

=== 1962 ===
1962 Madras Legislative Assembly election: Kattumannarkoil
Party	Candidate	Votes	%	±%
DMK	M. R. Krishnamurthi	27,706	47.14%	New
INC	G. Vageesam Pillai	27,599	46.95%	New
SWA	V. A. Govindasami Padayachair	3,474	5.91%	New
Margin of victory		107	0.18%	
Turnout		58,779	77.72%	
Registered electors		78,512		
DMK win (new seat)				
