= Minsaram =

2011 film directed by N. Selvakumaran

- Directed by: N. Selvakumaran
- Written by: N. Selvakumaran
- Produced by: M. S. Tamilarasan; Palani M. Eliyas
- Starring: Yuvaraj; Madhuchanda; Thol. Thirumavalavan
- Cinematography: K. V. Suresh
- Edited by: S. Saleem
- Music by: T. Devan
- Production company: Covai Film City
- Release date: 18 March 2011
- Running time: 110 minutes
- Country: India
- Language: Tamil

Minsaram (transl. Electricity) is a 2011 Indian Tamil language vigilante film directed by N. Selvakumaran. The film stars Yuvaraj, Madhuchanda, and Thol. Thirumavalavan, with Ajay Pradeep, Adith, Kannan, Babu, Sougandhi, Muthuswamy, Rajendranath, Bala Singh, Rama, Kadhal Sukumar, and Nellai Siva playing supporting roles. The film, produced by M. S. Tamilarasan and Palani M. Eliyas, had musical score by T. Devan and was released on 18 March 2011.

== Plot ==
A mysterious group kidnaps a politician, an advocate, a businessman, and a police officer. The Chief Minister of Tamil Nadu, Thamizharasan (Thol. Thirumavalavan), pressures the police to find the culprits. Ilavarasu (Yuvaraj), the leader of the group, contacts Thamizharasan via email and tells him why he had to kidnap them.

Ilavarasu was a carefree student who lived with his parents and his sister Jaya. One day, Raghava, the brother of the local don Kotti Kumaraaswamy (Muthuswamy), and his friends eve-teased and molested Jaya in a shop. Ilavarasu and his friends caught them and took them to the police station. Ilavarasu and his friends were then sent to jail. A vengeful Kumaraaswamy threatened Ilavarasu's family and made their lives miserable. Ilavarasu's father sought the help of ACP Venkatesh (Rajendranath) and filed a complaint against Kumaraaswamy, but Venkatesh, being Kumaraaswamy's loyal man, threw away his complaint. Kumaraaswamy's henchmen continued to tease Jaya, and one day, Ilavarasu and his friends beat them up. One of the rowdies died during the fight. Kumaraaswamy's henchmen then kidnapped Ilavarasu's family, and Kumaraaswamy brutally killed them. The journalist Kathir (Soumyan), Ilavarasu's girlfriend Aarthi (Madhuchanda), and his four friends (Ajay Pradeep, Adith, Kannan and Babu) decided to help Ilavarasu.

Back to the present, Thamizharasan feels bad for what happened to Ilavarasu and wants to help him. The next day, on live television, Ilavarasu and his friends introduce the hostages: corrupt politicians, corrupt police officers, corrupt advocates, fraudulent businessmen, and rowdies. They beg Thamizharasan to fight against social evils like corruption and rowdyism and ask him to abolish bail. The public strongly supports the students and their request. Thamizharasan also decides to support the students. He asks them to release the hostages and promises to clear them. When Thamizharasan went to see the governor, his car exploded, and on the news, he is pronounced dead. At the headquarters of Thamizharasan's party, the politicians have a savage fight on who will be the next leader of the party, and the governor dismisses the current government.

A few months later, Thamizharasan returns alive just before the election. Thamizharasan tells the media that he was saved by the students that day and they were protecting him from the people who tried to kill him. With the support of the students, Thamizharasan is re-elected as chief minister, and he finally abolishes bail.

== Cast ==
- Yuvaraj as Ilavarasu
- Madhuchanda as Aarthi
- Thol. Thirumavalavan as Thamizharasan
- Ajay Pradeep as Ajay, Ilavarasu's friend
- Adith as Ilavarasu's friend
- Kannan as Ilavarasu's friend
- Babu as Ilavarasu's friend
- Sougandhi as Kathir
- Muthuswamy as Kottai Kumaraswamy
- Rajendranath as ACP Venkatesh
- Bala Singh as Sundaramoorthy, Ilavarasu's father
- Rama as Ilavarasu's mother
- Kadhal Sukumar as Ilavarasu's friend
- Nellai Siva as Thooyavan
- Myna Nandhini as Jaya's friend
- Kovai Senthil as Tamil Professor
- Anju as Minister
- Lollu Sabha Balaji as Thamizharasan's assistant
- Selvakumar as Politician
- Nivetha as Nivetha
- Suraj
- R. S. Nathan
- Imran
- Kavita Banerjee
- Rekha
- Nagu Pinky in a special appearance
- Gana Ulaganathan in a special appearance
- Sujibala in a special appearance

== Production ==
Thol. Thirumavalavan, the leader of the political party Viduthalai Chiruthaigal Katchi, was cast to play the role of Chief Minister of Tamil Nadu and accepted the role after six months. He had also penned the lyrics for the song "Velethulu Manitha" during a three hour car ride.

== Soundtrack ==
Minsaram

Soundtrack album by T. Devan
- Released: 2009
- Recorded: 2009
- Genre: Feature film soundtrack
- Length: 36:28
- Producer: T. Devan

The film score and the soundtrack were composed by T. Devan. The soundtrack, released in 2009, features 7 tracks with lyrics written by Thol. Thirumavalavan, Muthu Vijayan, Shanmuga Seelan, Vaanavan and T. Devan.

Tracklist
No.	Title	Singer(s)	Length
1.	"Anantha Deepam"	Ranjith, Saindhavi	4:51
2.	"Gobala Gobalamma"	Manikka Vinayagam, Malathy Lakshman	5:10
3.	"Velethulu Manitha"	Tippu	6:41
4.	"Puthu Raagam (duet)"	C. N. S, Deepa Miriam	5:08
5.	"Kasimedu Kuppattaya"	Gana Ulaganathan, T. Devan	5:05
6.	"Oru Malai Poluthu"	Ranjith, Suchitra Ram	4:26
7.	"Puthu Raagam (solo)"	Deepa Miriam	5:07
Total length:			36:28

== Reception ==
Dinamalar praised the dialogue delivery of Thol. Thirumavalavan and the song sang by Gana Ulaganathan but criticised the writing and the direction.
