= V. S. Raji =

Indian politician

Member of the Tamil Nadu Legislative Assembly
- In office 2011–2016
- Succeeded by: R. T. Arasu
- Constituency: Cheyyur

Personal details
- Party: All India Anna Dravida Munnetra Kazhagam

V. S. Raji is an Indian politician and was a member of the 14th Tamil Nadu Legislative Assembly from the Cheyyur constituency, which was reserved for candidates from the Scheduled Castes. He represented the All India Anna Dravida Munnetra Kazhagam party.

The elections of 2016 resulted in his constituency being won by R.T. Arasu.

== Electoral performance ==
Election	Constituency	Political party	Result	Vote %	Opposition			Ref
Election	Constituency	Political party	Result	Vote %	Candidate	Political party	Vote %	Ref
2011	Cheyyur	AIADMK	Won	55.59%	D. Parventhan	VCK	36.72%	
