= Thol. Thirumavalavan =

Indian politician (born 1962)

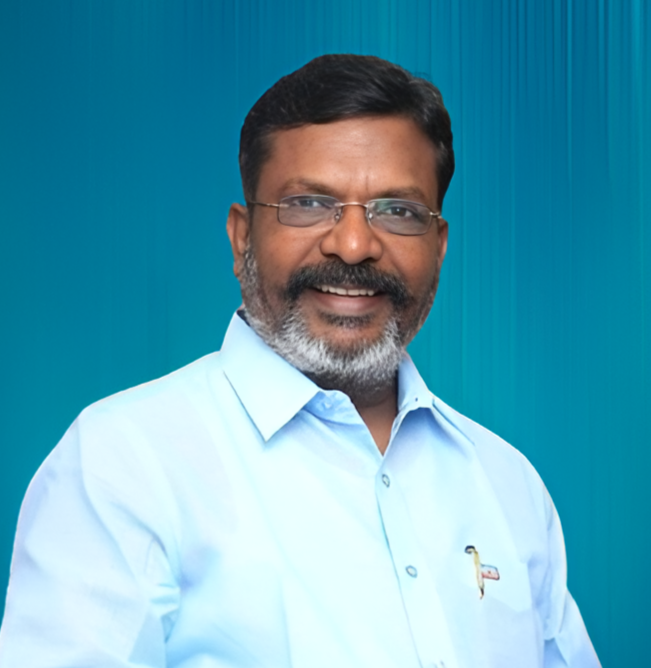

Member of Parliament, Lok Sabha
- Incumbent
- Assumed office 23 May 2019
- Preceded by: M. Chandrakasi
- Constituency: Chidambaram
- In office 16 May 2009 – 16 May 2014
- Preceded by: E. Ponnuswamy
- Succeeded by: M. Chandrakasi
- Constituency: Chidambaram

Member of Tamil Nadu Legislative Assembly
- In office 14 May 2001 – 3 February 2004
- Chief Minister: J. Jayalalithaa
- Preceded by: S. Puratchimani
- Succeeded by: C. V. Ganesan
- Constituency: Mangalore

President of Viduthalai Chiruthaigal Katchi
- Incumbent
- Assumed office 21 January 1990
- Preceded by: position established

Personal details
- Born: 17 August 1962 (age 64) Anganur, Tiruchirappalli district, Madras State (now in Ariyalur district, Tamil Nadu), India
- Party: Viduthalai Chiruthaigal Katchi (1982–present)
- Other political affiliations: Dalit Panthers (till 1982)
- Education: Presidency College, Chennai

Tholkappiyan Thirumavalavan (born Ramasamy Thirumavalavan on 17 August 1962), better known as Thol. Thirumavalavan, is an Indian politician and activist from Tamil Nadu. He is a Member of Parliament in the Lok Sabha representing Chidambaram. He has been the leader and president of the political party Viduthalai Chiruthaigal Katchi since 1990.

Thirumavalavan studied criminology and law, and worked for a time in the forensic department of the Government of Tamil Nadu. He rose to prominence in the 1990s as a Bahujan leader, and his political platform centres on Ambedkarite and Dravidian philosophies, and ending caste-based discrimination and caste system. He is also a critic of Hindu nationalism, which he believes would homogenise Tamil society and lead to Tamils losing their identity. He has also expressed support for Tamil nationalist movements in Sri Lanka, including the Liberation Tigers of Tamil Eelam, a militant secessionist group banned in India. He has authored a few books, and also acted in few Tamil films.

Thirumavalavan contested the 1999 and 2004 Indian general elections unsuccessfully from the Chidambaram constituency. In between, he was elected as the member of the Tamil Nadu Legislative Assembly in the 2001 assembly elections from Mangalore. Subsequently, he has won the 2009, 2019, and 2024 Indian general elections from Chidambaram, while losing in 2014. He also contested in the 2016 assembly elections from Kattumannarkoil and lost.

Thirumavalavan's confrontation with Pattali Makkal Katchi and its founder Ramadoss has resulted in frequent clashes between Dalits and the Vanniyars. While both of them reconciled their differences and worked together for a period in 2004 to 2009, when they were part of the same electoral alliance, both parties have often accused each other of instigating violence against the other community.

== Early life and education ==
Thirumavalavan received his Bachelor's degree in Chemistry at Presidency college Chennai, and Master's degree in Criminology. He later pursued Law at Madras Law College. He was awarded his PhD by the Manonmaniam Sundaranar University in 2018, based on his thesis "Religious conversion of Meenakshipuram Dalits – a victimological study".

== Early activism ==
When he was studying at Madras Law College, Thirumavalavan got interested in the Sri Lankan Tamil nationalist movement, after hearing a speech of Suba Veerapandian, whom he met later.

In 1988, when working for the government's Forensic Department in the southern city of Madurai, he met Malaichamy, the Tamil Nadu state convenor of the Dalit Panthers Iyyakkam (DPI), an organisation that fought for the rights of Dalits. Following Malaichamy's death, Thirumalavan was elected as the leader of the DPI on 21 January 1990. He designed a new flag for the party and changed its name to Viduthalai Chiruthaigal Katchi (Liberation Panthers Party). As part of his work, he began visiting Dalit villages in the Madurai region, and began learning about the problems faced by Dalits. According to him, the killing of two Dalits in the region in 1992, made him take up the fight for their cause. His aggressive speeches gained him significant recognition. Against the background of increasing Dalit participation in politics, he emerged as one of major Dalit leaders in Tamil Nadu, with a significant support base particularly in the southern districts of Tamil Nadu. In early 1997, he was suspended from his government job on account of his increased political activity. He resigned from his job formally in August 1999.

== Political career ==
The DPI did not participate in the electoral process until the to contest the 1999 Indian general election. The decision of contesting the election in 1999 was considered controversial within the party. Thirumavalavan allied with G. K. Moopanar's Tamil Maanila Congress as a part of an alternative front to the ones led by Dravida Munnetra Kazhagam (DMK) and All India Anna Dravida Munnetra Kazhagam (AIADMK), the two prominent parties in Tamil Nadu. The party contested in the Chidambaram and Perambalur parliamentary constituencies. Thirumavalavan lost from Chidambaram to E. Ponnuswamy from the Pattali Makkal Katchi (PMK). He later alleged in one of his interviews on 22 February 2000 that the ruling DMK administration used the police force to detain the cadres of his party. It also led to the continued rivalry between his party and the PMK, which represented Dalits and Vanniyars respectively, and was marked by violence from both the parties.

In the 2001 Tamil Nadu assembly elections, the Viduthalai Chiruthaigal Katchi (VCK) allied with the DMK and contested in seven seats. Since the PMK joined the AIADMK-led alliance, the VCK chose to join the opposite alliance. Though the DMK-led alliance also had the Bharathiya Janata Party (BJP), with which VCK had ideological differences and was criticised earlier by Thirumavalavan, he still joined the alliance. He was elected from Mangalore constituency to the legislative assembly, contesting on the symbol of the DMK. He resigned his position from the assembly on 3 February 2004, citing difference with the alliance partners, especially the DMK. He contested once again from Chidambaram in the 2004 general elections, in alliance with the Janata Dal (United), and lost to Ponnuswamy of the PMK again.

In 2004, Thirumavalavan briefly joined hands with Ramadoss, the founder of PMK, in a Tamil language protection movement named "Tamil Paathukappu Iyakkam". VCK later joined the AIADMK alliance for the 2006 assembly elections, and was recognised as a registered political party by the Election Commission of India on 2 March 2006. VCK contested in nine seats in Tamil Nadu and two seats in Pondicherry, and won two seats. The party broke the alliance with AIADMK in 2006, and allied with the DMK for the local elections, and won five municipalities. In the 2009 general election, Thirumavalavan allied with DMK and was elected to Lok Sabha in his third attempt from the Chidhambaram constituency. On 31 August 2009, he was appointed to the committee on commerce and consultative committee on ministry of social justice and empowerment.

Subsequently, he has won the 2019, and 2024 Indian general elections from Chidambaram, while losing in 2014. He also contested in the 2016 assembly elections from Kattumannarkoil and lost.

== Positions held ==
Year	Position	Institution
2001–2004	Member	Tamil Nadu Legislative Assembly
2009	Member	15th Lok Sabha
2019	Member	17th Lok Sabha
2024	Member	18th Lok Sabha

== Electoral Performance ==
=== General Elections ===
Year	Constituency	Party	Votes	%	Opponent	Opponent Party	Opponent Votes	%	Result	Margin	%
2024	Chidambaram	VCK	505,084	43.28	M. Chandrahasan	AIADMK	401,530	34.40	Won	103,554	8.68
2019	Chidambaram	VCK	500,229	43.52	P. Chandrasekar	AIADMK	497,010	43.24	Won	3,219	0.28
2014	Chidambaram	VCK	301,041	27.97	M. Chandrakasi	AIADMK	429,536	39.91	Lost	−128,495	−11.94
2009	Chidambaram	VCK	428,804	49.30	E. Ponnuswamy	PMK	329,721	37.96	Won	99,083	11.41
2004	Chidambaram	JD(U)	255,773	34.41	E. Ponnuswamy	PMK	343,424	46.20	Lost	−87,651	−11.79
1999	Chidambaram	TMC(M)	225,768	31.17	E. Ponnuswamy	PMK	345,331	47.68	Lost	−119,563	−16.51

=== Tamil Nadu Legislative Assembly ===
Year	Constituency	Party	Votes	%	Opponent	Opponent Party	Opponent Votes	%	Result	Margin	%
2016	Kattumannarkoil	VCK	48,363	29.28	N. Murugumaran	AIADMK	48,450	29.33	Lost	−87	−0.05
2001	Mangaloree	DMK	64,627	47.87	S. Puratchimani	TMC(M)	62,772	46.49	Won	1,855	1.37

== Political views ==
Thirumalavan's politics are based on Ambedkarite and Dravidian philosophies, and a retheorization of Tamil nationalism, which seeks to end the caste system. As per him, the oppression of Dalits is institutionalised in India, and although the Dravidian parties, which dominate the politics of Tamil Nadu, are ideologically against the caste system, he argues that they have in practice drifted away from the original ideals of the Dravidian movement. Their policies, he says, have mainly benefited the backward class, has led to an increase in the oppression of Dalits, with these castes replacing the Brahmins as the oppressor, and Dalits cannot not expect much help from these parties. The solution, according to him, lies in Tamil nationalism, and the caste oppression can only be ended by building resistance from below, through appealing to Tamil sentiments, as happened in the early days of the Dravidian movement under Periyar. He says that the caste oppression will disappear if a Tamil nationalist government is formed in Tamil Nadu. In 2009, he welcomed an announcement of the state government to implement a three percent reservation in educational institutes for the Dalits.

Thirumavalavan's views have led him to support the Tamil secessionist groups in Sri Lanka, including the Liberation Tigers of Tamil Eelam, a militant secessionist group who are formally banned as a terrorist organisation in India. He has criticised India for assisting the Sri Lankan army during the Sri Lankan military operations against the LTTE, and has called upon the Tamil Nadu state government to take steps to safeguard the interest of Sri Lankan Tamils. On 15 January 2009, he went on a hunger strike in Chennai for the cause of Sri Lankan Tamils. After four days, he called off the fast, saying that it had had no effect on the Indian government, and calling for a hartal in its place. He was later part of a ten member team that visited the war-affected areas and transitional centres in Vavuniya on 11 October 2009. The delegation visited various parts of Jaffna district and held a meeting at the Jaffna Public Library.

Thirumavalvan has criticised the Hindu society for, in his views, being built on the basis of caste and obeying the Manusmriti. He is a staunch critic of Hindu nationalism and Hindutva, which according to him, is the essence of the oppressive Indian state. He argues that Hindutva has worked to homogenise Tamil society through religion, which has led to Tamils losing their identity, and ethnic Tamil nationalism is essential to combat this. He has opposed the BJP and the Rashtriya Swayamsevak Sangh for their agenda, and opposed the Citizenship Amendment Act in 2019. He views these organizations and their ideology as being against the ideas of secularism and social justice, and the idea of a Hindu Rashtra goes against the Indian Constitution and would lead to continuation of caste hierarchies. He believes that Sanatan Dharma rejects equality, freedom and brotherhood, and these organisations want to divide people on religious lines to implement the Manu Dharma. In 2021, he claimed that it is his policy to expose to people, the intentions of the BJP which seeks to gain political advantage by cultivating casteism in Tamil soil, inciting religious hatred and division.

== Film career ==
Thirumavalavan made a guest appearance as a Tamil militant leader in the Sri Lankan Tamil film Anbu Thozhi (2007), directed by L. G. Ravichandran. He was cast in the lead role of a film titled Kalaham, directed by Kalanjiyam, which was later shelved. He also appeared in a song in Mansoor Ali Khan's Ennai Paar Yogam Varum (2007). In 2011, he played the role of a politician in Minsaram.

=== Filmography ===
Year	Film	Role	Notes	Ref(s)
2007	Anbu Thozhi	Karuppu	Guest appearance	
2007	Ennai Paar Yogam Varum	Singer	Special appearance	
2011	Minsaram	Thamizharasan		

== Works ==
- Aththumeeru (Transgress), Tamizhargal Hindukkala? (Are the Tamils, Hindus?)
- Eelam Enral Puligal, Puligal Enral Eelam (Eelam means Tigers, Tigers means Eelam)
- Hindutuvathai Veraruppom (We Shall Uproot Hindutva)
- Saadhiya Sandharpavaadha Aniyai Veezhtuvom (We Shall Defeat the Casteist Opportunist Alliance).
- Two of his books have been published in English by Stree-Samya Books, Kolkata: Talisman: Extreme Emotions of Dalit Liberation (political essays written for 34 weeks in the India Today magazine's Tamil edition) and Uproot Hindutva: The Fiery Voice of the Liberation Panthers (contains 12 of his speeches).
- In 2018, he released a book Amaipai Thiralvom based on his political experiences which received warm welcome, positive reviews and also criticism from various Intellectual sources

== Controversies ==
In northern Tamil Nadu, which has a significant Vanniyar population, there have been frequent clashes between the Dalits and Vanniyars. Thirumavalavan has often blamed PMK and its founder Ramadoss of instigating violence among the Vanniyars that result in the attack of Dalits. Meanwhile, as Ramadoss alleged that Thirumavalavan encourages his party men to perform inter-caste marriages, Thirumavalavan has accused Ramadoss of showing caste superiority and instigating violence against Dalits. Though they were part of the same alliance fromf 2004 to 2009, the mutual confrontation started again after the split.

During December 2012, Ramadoss formed an all community safeguard forum comprising 51 intermediate castes. He said he would not have any further alliance with Thirumavalavan and his party. He alleged that the Dalits take undue advantage over other communities using the SC/ST Prevention of Atrocities Act and the Act should be abolished. During April 2013, after the party conference of PMK in Mahabalipuram, there were widespread attacks on the Dalits in Dharmapuri district that resulted in two Dalits being killed. Both PMK and VCK accused each other for the mishap, but Ramadoss was arrested after the orders from the state government for the hate speech and damages to the state property during the violence. Thirumavalavan accused Ramadoss that his loss in the electoral base after the 2009 general elections and 2011 assembly elections has resulted in his going back to instigating caste violence.

The BSP was floated in Tamil Nadu in December 2008 with the same ideology as in Uttar Pradesh to unite the Dalits and Brahmins. Some of the prominent members of VCK like Selvaperunthagai, who was a MLA in Mangalore constituency, joined BSP. Thirumavalavan, in his response, claimed that the BSP is no threat to VCK vote bank and that the BSP has dumped the principles of Ambedkar, Kanshi Ram and Periyar. Some of the senior journalists also believed that BSP will not have a firm hold in Tamil Nadu to garner the 19% Dalit vote bank in Tamil Nadu as it did in Uttar Pradesh, as the vote bank is already split by the VCK and Puthia Tamizhagam party.

The VCK, in a plan to start a television channel, asked the party men to donate gold on the occasion of the 50th birthday of Thirumavalavan. There were also Thulabaram type of functions where equal weight of Thirmavalavan was donated. This was subject to wider criticism, drawing parallels with the exotic celebrations organised by Mayawati, the leader of BSP in Uttar Pradesh. Thirumavalavan clarified that the idea was to collect donations for the party and that his party did not enjoy support from rich people as with the case of other parties. As of 4 October 2012, the party got 10 kg (22 lb) of gold from seven centres that included Puducherry that had 1.5 kg (3.3 lb).

An altered video of a webinar from September 2020 in which Thirumavalavan was mentioning certain portions from Manusmriti on the status of women and their role created a controversy where he allegedly said that the Manusmriti treated all women as prostitutes. As soon as the video gained steam, BJP members condemned his statements and claimed that Thirumavalavan had insulted women by referring to them as prostitutes. Thirumavalavan, however, claimed that he was not demeaning women but emancipating them and that he was merely quoting great leaders. The Chennai city police registered a case against Thirumavalavan for over his comment on Manusmriti on 23 October 2020, based on a complaint by BJP legal cell state secretary. The VCK cadre across Tamil Nadu staged protests, after the call for protests by Thirumavalavan urging the state and union government to ban Manusmriti on 24 October 2020 saying that the Manusmriti degrades Dalits, indigenous people, women and backward castes and spreads hate on them. During the protests, he claimed that a few groups edited out five minutes from the forty minute video and claimed that he was demeaning women and the Hindutva groups are circulating the false message against him.

In September 2023, Thirumavalavan made derogatory remarks on Sanatan Dharma by calling it a contagious disease and a threat to democracy. He also called for its annihilation. His remarks received widespread criticism from all over India. He made the statement on the backdrop of Tamil Nadu politician (and former Deputy Chief Minister) Udhayanidhi Stalin's remarks on Sanatan dharma comparing it to "dengue and malaria".
