= E. Ponnuswamy =

Indian politician

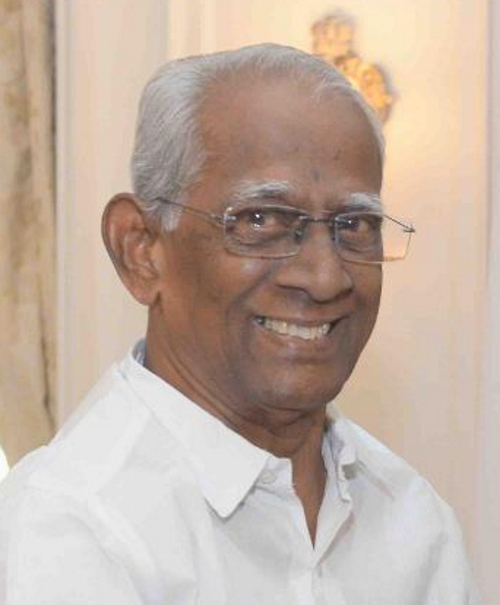

Union Minister of State for Petroleum and Natural Gas
- In office 13 October 1999 – 7 February 2001 Serving with Santosh Gangwar (from 22 November 1999)
- Prime Minister: Atal Bihari Vajpayee
- Preceded by: Santosh Gangwar
- Succeeded by: Santosh Gangwar; Sumitra Mahajan

Member of Parliament, Lok Sabha
- In office 1999 – 2009
- Preceded by: Dalit Ezhilmalai
- Succeeded by: Thol. Thirumavalavan
- Constituency: Chidambaram

Personal details
- Born: 1 July 1936 (age 89) Thiruvannamalai, Tamil Nadu
- Party: PMK
- Spouse: P. Shanthi
- Children: 2 daughters
- Education: M.A. (Political Science)
- As of 22 September, 2006

E. Ponnuswamy (born 1 July 1936) was a member of the 14th Lok Sabha of India. He represented the Chidambaram constituency of Tamil Nadu and is a member of the Pattali Makkal Katchi (PMK) political party. He translate and wrote many books
