= E. Rajasekar =

Indian politician (born 1962)

Member of the Tamil Nadu Legislative Assembly
- Incumbent
- Assumed office 11 May 2026
- Preceded by: M. Babu
- Constituency: Cheyyur

Personal details
- Party: All India Anna Dravida Munnetra Kazhagam

Ethirajan Rajasekar (born 1962) is an Indian politician from Tamil Nadu. He is a member of the Tamil Nadu Legislative Assembly from the Cheyyur Assembly constituency, which is reserved for Scheduled Caste community, in Chengalpattu district, representing the All India Anna Dravida Munnetra Kazhagam.

== Early life ==
Rajasekar is from Sholinganallur, Chengalpattu district, Tamil Nadu. He is the son of the late Ethirajan. He passed Class 10 in 1977 and later discontinued his studies. He is a realtor and runs his own business. He declared assets worth Rs.68 crore in his affidvit to the Election Commission of India.

== Career ==
Rajasekar won the Cheyyur Assembly constituency representing the All India Anna Dravida Munnetra Kazhagam in the 2026 Tamil Nadu Legislative Assembly election. He polled 63,809 votes and defeated his nearest rival, K. Mohan Raja of the Tamilaga Vettri Kazhagam (TVK), by a margin of 5,668 votes.
