= E. Ramalingam =

Indian politician

Maruthur.E. Ramalingam is an Indian politician and former Member of the Legislative Assembly of Tamil Nadu. He was elected to the Tamil Nadu legislative assembly as a Dravida Munnetra Kazhagam candidate from Kattumannarkoil constituency in 1977, 1980, and 1996 elections.
