= Mangalore, Tamil Nadu Assembly constituency =

Former assembly constituency of the Tamil Nadu Legislative Assembly

Coordinates: 11.52°N 79.01°E

Mangalore
- Former constituency for the Tamil Nadu Legislative Assembly

Constituency details
- Country: India
- Region: South India
- State: Tamil Nadu
- District: Cuddalore
- Lok Sabha constituency: Chidambaram
- Established: 1967
- Abolished: 2008
- Total electors: 1,93,879

Mangalore (SC) or Mangalur (SC) was the legislative assembly in Cuddalore district, which includes the city, Mangalore, Tamil Nadu. The seat was reserved for Scheduled Caste. It was part of Chidambaram Lok Sabha constituency until the 2008 delimitation. Mangalore was dissolved and merged with Tittakudi Assembly constituency.

== Members of the Legislative Assembly ==
Assembly	Duration	Winner	Party
Fourth	1967–71	A. Krishnan	Dravida Munnetra Kazhagam
Fifth	1971–77	G. Jabamalai	Dravida Munnetra Kazhagam
Sixth	1977–80	M. Periyasamy	All India Anna Dravida Munnetra Kazhagam
Seventh	1980–84	P. Kaliamoorthy	All India Anna Dravida Munnetra Kazhagam
Eighth	1984–89	S. Thangaraju	All India Anna Dravida Munnetra Kazhagam
Ninth	1989–91	C. V. Ganesan	Dravida Munnetra Kazhagam
Tenth	1991–96	S. Puratchimani	Indian National Congress
Eleventh	1996-01	S. Puratchimani	Tamil Maanila Congress
Twelfth	2001–04	E. R. A. Thirumavalavan	Dravida Munnetra Kazhagam
Twelfth	2004–06	C. V. Ganesan	Dravida Munnetra Kazhagam
Thirteenth	2006 - 11	K. Selvaperunthagai	Viduthalai Chiruthaigal Katchi

== Election results ==
=== 2006 ===
2006 Tamil Nadu Legislative Assembly election: Mangalore
Party	Candidate	Votes	%	±%
VCK	K. Selvam	62,217	43.71%	
DMK	C. V. Ganesan	55,303	38.85%	−9.02%
DMDK	D. Mahadevan	15,992	11.23%	
Independent	K. Thiruvalluvan	2,462	1.73%	
BJP	R. Narentheran	2,173	1.53%	
Independent	T. Elavarasan	1,585	1.11%	
Margin of victory		6,914	4.86%	3.48%
Turnout		142,349	73.42%	4.15%
Registered electors		193,879		
VCK gain from DMK		Swing	-4.16%	

=== 2001 ===
2001 Tamil Nadu Legislative Assembly election: Mangalore
Party	Candidate	Votes	%	±%
DMK	E. R. A. Thirumavalavan	64,627	47.87%	
TMC(M)	S. Puratchimani	62,772	46.49%	
MDMK	S. Thangaraj	3,683	2.73%	−0.55%
Independent	C. Palanivel	1,975	1.46%	
LJP	V. Subramanian	1,959	1.45%	
Margin of victory		1,855	1.37%	−14.81%
Turnout		135,016	69.27%	1.16%
Registered electors		194,908		
DMK gain from TMC(M)		Swing	5.16%	

=== 1996 ===
1996 Tamil Nadu Legislative Assembly election: Mangalore
Party	Candidate	Votes	%	±%
TMC(M)	S. Puratchimani	50,908	42.71%	
INC	V. M. S. Saravanakumar	31,620	26.53%	−29.11%
HRPI	M. Alanvanthar	17,860	14.98%	
BSP	P. Nagappan	12,282	10.30%	9.80%
MDMK	G. Soundararajan	3,909	3.28%	
Independent	V. Veeramuthu	707	0.59%	
Independent	V. Samidurai	463	0.39%	
Independent	R. Elangovan	374	0.31%	
Independent	S. Chidambaram	353	0.30%	
Independent	R. Karuppaiyan	254	0.21%	
Independent	A. Adhavarohini	186	0.16%	
Margin of victory		19,288	16.18%	−15.74%
Turnout		119,195	68.12%	−0.03%
Registered electors		187,325		
TMC(M) gain from INC		Swing	-12.92%	

=== 1991 ===
1991 Tamil Nadu Legislative Assembly election: Mangalore
Party	Candidate	Votes	%	±%
INC	S. Puratchimani	62,302	55.63%	37.21%
DMK	C. V. Ganesan	26,549	23.71%	−18.98%
PMK	S. Dhiravidamani	21,165	18.90%	
THMM	R. Kasinathan	629	0.56%	
BSP	V. Sivaprakasam	560	0.50%	
Independent	S. Chidambaram	545	0.49%	
Independent	V. Duraisamy	235	0.21%	
Margin of victory		35,753	31.93%	9.68%
Turnout		111,985	68.15%	6.42%
Registered electors		169,669		
INC gain from DMK		Swing	12.94%	

=== 1989 ===
1989 Tamil Nadu Legislative Assembly election: Mangalore
Party	Candidate	Votes	%	±%
DMK	C. V. Ganesan	39,831	42.69%	6.93%
AIADMK	K. Ramalingam	19,072	20.44%	−40.96%
INC	Kamaraj	17,193	18.43%	
AIADMK	S. Thangaraju	14,195	15.21%	−46.18%
India Farmers and Tailers Party	Sivashanmugam	1,208	1.29%	
Independent	M. Jayaraman	693	0.74%	
Independent	Mookkan	454	0.49%	
Independent	Sellan	415	0.44%	
Independent	R. N. Duraisamy	122	0.13%	
Independent	Durai Velavanar	121	0.13%	
Margin of victory		20,759	22.25%	−3.39%
Turnout		93,304	61.73%	−8.90%
Registered electors		154,870		
DMK gain from AIADMK		Swing	-18.71%	

=== 1984 ===
1984 Tamil Nadu Legislative Assembly election: Mangalore
Party	Candidate	Votes	%	±%
AIADMK	S. Thangaraju	55,408	61.40%	12.49%
DMK	N. Muthuvel	32,273	35.76%	
INC(J)	S. Mathiyalagan	922	1.02%	
Independent	K. Thamodaran	851	0.94%	
Independent	K. . Thillalchidambaram	331	0.37%	
Independent	P. Veerapandiyan	246	0.27%	
Independent	K. Veeramanickam	212	0.23%	
Margin of victory		23,135	25.64%	24.21%
Turnout		90,243	70.62%	5.37%
Registered electors		136,839		
AIADMK hold		Swing	12.49%	

=== 1980 ===
1980 Tamil Nadu Legislative Assembly election: Mangalore
Party	Candidate	Votes	%	±%
AIADMK	P. Kaliamoorthy	40,678	48.90%	8.59%
INC	S. Kamaraj	39,495	47.48%	24.94%
Independent	N. Sarguru	1,212	1.46%	
BJP	R. Elangovan	988	1.19%	
Independent	Kandhimathy	408	0.49%	
Independent	S. Appavu	397	0.48%	
Margin of victory		1,183	1.42%	−16.03%
Turnout		83,178	65.25%	3.62%
Registered electors		130,395		
AIADMK hold		Swing	8.59%	

=== 1977 ===
1977 Tamil Nadu Legislative Assembly election: Mangalore
Party	Candidate	Votes	%	±%
AIADMK	M. Periyasamy	30,616	40.32%	
DMK	V. Ponnuswamy	17,361	22.86%	−29.38%
INC	P. Vedamanickam	17,117	22.54%	−11.28%
JP	R. Elangovan	6,610	8.70%	
Independent	N. Sargurunatarajan	3,043	4.01%	
Independent	A. Krishnan	1,194	1.57%	
Margin of victory		13,255	17.45%	−0.96%
Turnout		75,941	61.63%	−6.71%
Registered electors		125,283		
AIADMK gain from DMK		Swing	-11.92%	

=== 1971 ===
1971 Tamil Nadu Legislative Assembly election: Mangalore
Party	Candidate	Votes	%	±%
DMK	G. Jabamalai	32,612	52.24%	−4.44%
INC	R. Perumal	21,114	33.82%	−1.74%
Independent	A. Krishnan	3,967	6.35%	
Independent	P. Vedamanickam	3,730	5.97%	
Independent	V. Duraisami	1,008	1.61%	
Margin of victory		11,498	18.42%	−2.70%
Turnout		62,431	68.34%	−2.08%
Registered electors		96,126		
DMK hold		Swing	-4.44%	

=== 1967 ===
1967 Madras Legislative Assembly election: Mangalore
Party	Candidate	Votes	%	±%
DMK	A. Krishnan	34,538	56.67%	
INC	P. Vedamanickam	21,669	35.56%	
Independent	M. Kattimuth	2,204	3.62%	
Independent	V. Krishnan	845	1.39%	
Independent	K. Rayar	654	1.07%	
Independent	V. Duraisamy	562	0.92%	
Independent	P. Muthukannu	471	0.77%	
Margin of victory		12,869	21.12%	
Turnout		60,943	70.42%	
Registered electors		90,557		
DMK win (new seat)				
