= R. Kanagasabai Pillai =

Indian politician

R. Kanagasabai Pillai was an Indian politician and former Member of Parliament elected from Tamil Nadu. He was elected to the Lok Sabha from Chidambaram constituency as an Indian National Congress candidate in 1957 and 1962 elections.

He also served as a Member of the Legislative Assembly of Tamil Nadu. He was elected to the Tamil Nadu legislative assembly as an Indian National Congress candidate from Chidambaram constituency in the 1967 election.
