= M. Chandrakasi =

Indian politician

Member of the India Parliament for Chidambaram
- In office 1 September 2014 – 29 May 2019
- Preceded by: Thol. Thirumavalavan
- Succeeded by: Thol. Thirumavalavan
- Constituency: Chidambaram

Personal details
- Born: 4 January 1969 (age 57) Perumathur, Perambalur, Tamil Nadu
- Party: All India Anna Dravida Munnetra Kazhagam
- Spouse: Smt. C. Vanitha
- Children: 2
- Education: Bharathidasan University, Annamalai University
- Occupation: Agriculturist
- As of 17 December, 2016

M. Chandrakasi (born 4 January 1969) is an Indian politician and Member of Parliament elected from Tamil Nadu. He is elected to the Lok Sabha from Chidambaram constituency as an Anna Dravida Munnetra Kazhagam candidate in 2014 election.
