= V. Mayavan =

Indian politician

V. Mayavan was an Indian politician and former Member of Parliament elected from Tamil Nadu. He was elected to the Lok Sabha from Chidambaram constituency as a Dravida Munnetra Kazhagam candidate in 1967, and 1971 elections.
