= L. E. Jothimani =

Indian politician (born 1955)

Member of the Tamil Nadu Legislative Assembly
- Incumbent
- Assumed office 11 May 2026
- Preceded by: Sinthanai Selvan
- Constituency: Kattumannarkoil

Personal details
- Born: Jothimani; 26 October 1955 (age 71) Kattumannarkoil, Tamil Nadu, India
- Party: Viduthalai Chiruthaigal Katchi
- Parent: Elaiyaperumal (father)

L. Elaiyaperumal Jothimani (born 26 October 1955), is an Indian politician from Tamil Nadu. He is a member of the Tamil Nadu Legislative Assembly from the Kattumannarkoil Assembly constituency which is reserved for Scheduled Caste community, in Cuddalore district, representing the Viduthalai Chiruthaigal Katchi (VCK).

== Early life ==
Jothimani is from Kattumannarkoil, Cuddalore district, Tamil Nadu. He is the son of Elaiyaperumal. He did his pre university course at Pachayappas College, Chennai, then Madras, and passed Class 12 in 1979. Later, he did Engineering Trade (NCVT) at Chennai Port Trust in 1984. He is a retired employee with pension and declared assets worth Rs.85 lakhs in his affidavit to the Election Commission of India.

== Career ==
Jothimani won from the Kattumannarkoil Assembly constituency representing the Viduthalai Chiruthaigal Katchi in the 2026 Tamil Nadu Legislative Assembly election. He polled 85,179 votes and defeated his nearest rival, A. Sozhan of the Pattali Makkal Katchi, by a margin of votes.
