= Cheyyur Assembly constituency =

State Legislative Assembly Constituency in Tamil Nadu

Coordinates: 12.6580°N 79.5424°E

Cheyyur
- Constituency No. 34 for the Tamil Nadu Legislative Assembly

Constituency details
- Country: India
- Region: South India
- State: Tamil Nadu
- District: Chengalpattu
- Lok Sabha constituency: Kancheepuram
- Established: 2008
- Total electors: 2,04,049
- Reservation: SC

Member of Legislative Assembly
- 17th Tamil Nadu Legislative Assembly
- Incumbent E. Rajasekar
- Party: AIADMK
- Alliance: NDA
- Elected year: 2026

Cheyyur is a state assembly constituency in Tamil Nadu, India, that was formed after constituency delimitation in 2008. Its State Assembly Constituency number is 34. Located in Chengalpattu district, it comprises Cheyyur taluk and a portion of Tirukalukundram taluk. It is included in Kancheepuram Lok Sabha constituency for elections to the Parliament of India. It is reserved for candidates from the Scheduled Castes. It is one of the 234 State Legislative Assembly Constituencies in Tamil Nadu in India.

== Members of the Legislative Assembly ==
Election	Member	Party
2011	V. S. Raji	All India Anna Dravida Munnetra Kazhagam
2016	R. T. Arasu	Dravida Munnetra Kazhagam
2021	M. Babu	Viduthalai Chiruthaigal Katchi
2026	E. Rajasekar	All India Anna Dravida Munnetra Kazhagam

== Election results ==
Vote share of winning candidates
2026	34.02%
2021	46.49%
2016	37.51%
2011	55.59%

=== Assembly election 2026 ===
2026 Tamil Nadu Legislative Assembly election : Cheyyur
Party	Candidate	Votes	%	±%
AIADMK	E. Rajasekar	63,809	34.02%	New
TVK	M. G. K. Mohan Raja	58,141	30.99%	New
VCK	M. Sinthanai Selvan	57,909	30.87%	▼15.62
NTK	Swathilakshmi Sekar	4,853	2.59%	▼2.83
NOTA	None of the above	783	0.42%	▼0.22
Margin of victory		5,668	3.02%	▲0.75
Turnout		188,026	92.15%	▲13.30
Total valid votes		187,584		
Registered electors		204,049		▼10.30
AIADMK gain from VCK		Swing	▼12.47	

=== Assembly election 2021 ===
2021 Tamil Nadu Legislative Assembly election : Cheyyur
Party	Candidate	Votes	%	±%
VCK	M. Babu	82,750	46.49%	▲35.89
AIADMK	S. Kanitha Sampath	78,708	44.22%	▲6.89
NTK	R. Rajesh	9,653	5.42%	▲4.88
DMDK	A. Siva	3,054	1.72%	New
MNM	P. Anbu Tamilsekaran	1,968	1.11%	New
NOTA	None of the above	1,141	0.64%	▼0.44
Margin of victory		4,042	2.27%	▲2.09
Turnout		179,351	78.85%	▼1.30
Total valid votes		177,979		
Rejected ballots		231	0.13%	▲0.08
Registered electors		227,468		▲7.74
VCK gain from DMK		Swing	▲8.98	

=== Assembly election 2016 ===
2016 Tamil Nadu Legislative Assembly election : Cheyyur
Party	Candidate	Votes	%	±%
DMK	R. T. Arasu	63,446	37.51%	New
AIADMK	A. Munusamy	63,142	37.33%	▼18.26
VCK	Ezhil Caroline	17,927	10.60%	▼26.12
PMK	V. Sadaiyappan	17,892	10.58%	New
NOTA	None of the above	1,827	1.08%	New
BJP	P. Sampath	1,559	0.92%	▼0.06
Margin of victory		304	0.18%	▼18.69
Turnout		169,218	80.15%	▼0.93
Total valid votes		169,134		
Rejected ballots		84	0.05%	▼0.04
Registered electors		211,135		▲21.41
DMK gain from AIADMK		Swing	▼18.08	

=== Assembly election 2011 ===
2011 Tamil Nadu Legislative Assembly election : Cheyyur
Party	Candidate	Votes	%	±%
AIADMK	V. S. Raji	78,307	55.59%	New
VCK	D. Parventhan	51,723	36.72%	New
Puratchi Bharatham	O. E. Sankar	2,322	1.65%	New
Independent	T. Raji	2,162	1.53%	New
BJP	P. Sampath	1,387	0.98%	New
BSP	V. Kathavarayan	1,241	0.88%	New
Independent	M. Gangadharan	1,144	0.81%	New
IJK	M. Murugan	1,030	0.73%	New
Margin of victory		26,584	18.87%	
Turnout		141,004	81.08%	
Total valid votes		140,871		
Rejected ballots		133	0.09%	
Registered electors		173,908		
AIADMK win (new seat)				
