= Chidambaram Lok Sabha constituency =

Parliamentary constituency in Tamil Nadu, India

Coordinates: 11.4°N 79.7°E

Chidambaram
- Lok Sabha constituency
- Interactive map of Sriperumbudur Loksabha constituency, post-2008 delimitation

Constituency details
- Country: India
- Region: South India
- State: Tamil Nadu
- Assembly constituencies: Kunnam; Ariyalur; Jayankondam; Bhuvanagiri; Chidambaram; Kattumannarkoil
- Established: 1957
- Total electors: 14,79,108
- Reservation: SC

Member of Parliament
- 18th Lok Sabha
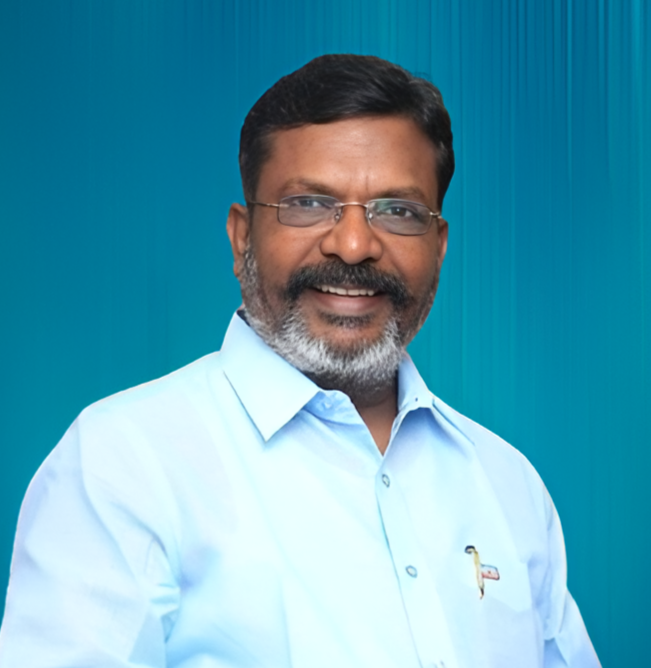
- Incumbent Thol. Thirumavalavan
- Party: VCK
- Alliance: INDIA
- Elected year: 2024
- Preceded by: M. Chandrakasi

Chidambaram is a Lok Sabha (Parliament of India) constituency in Tamil Nadu. Its Tamil Nadu Parliamentary Constituency number is 27 of 39. The seat is reserved for scheduled castes. It spread on district of Ariyalur and Cuddalore.

== Assembly segments ==
=== After 2009 ===
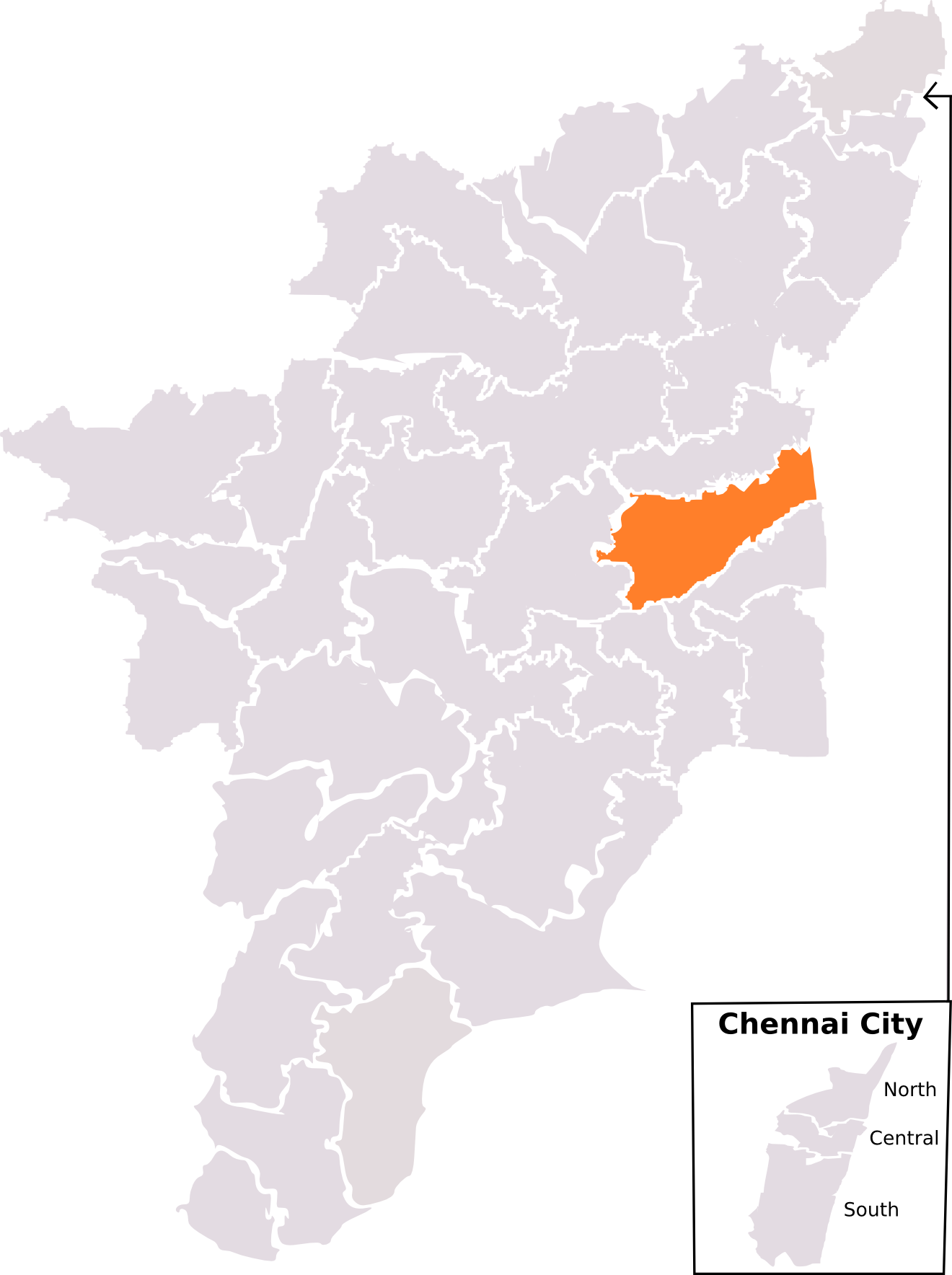
Chidambaram constituency as laid out by 2008 Delimitation

Chidambaram Lok Sabha constituency is composed of the following assembly segments:

Constituency number	Name	Reserved for (SC/ST/None)	District	Party	2024 Lead
148	Kunnam	None	Perambalur	DMK	VCK
149	Ariyalur	None	Ariyalur	AIADMK	AIADMK
150	Jayankondam	None	Ariyalur	PMK	AIADMK
157	Bhuvanagiri	None	Cuddalore	AIADMK	VCK
158	Chidambaram	None	Cuddalore	DMK	VCK
159	Kattumannarkoil	SC	Cuddalore	VCK	VCK

=== Before 2009 ===
Chidambaram Lok Sabha constituency was composed of the following assembly segments:

1. Kurinjipadi (moved to Cuddalore)
2. Bhuvanagiri
3. Kattumannarkoil (SC)
4. Chidambaram
5. Mangalore (SC) (defunct)
6. Vridhachalam (moved to Cuddalore)

== Members of Parliament ==
Year	Winning Candidate	Party
1957	R. Kangasabai Pillai	Indian National Congress
1957	Elayaperumal	Indian National Congress
1962	R. Kanagasabai Pillai	Indian National Congress
1967	V. Mayavan	Dravida Munnetra Kazhagam
1971	V. Mayavan	Dravida Munnetra Kazhagam
1977	A. Murugesan	All India Anna Dravida Munnetra Kazhagam
1980	P. Kulandaivelu	Dravida Munnetra Kazhagam
1984	P. Vallalperuman	Indian National Congress
1989	P. Vallalperuman	Indian National Congress
1991	P. Vallalperuman	Indian National Congress
1996	C. V. Ganesan	Dravida Munnetra Kazhagam
1998	Dalit Ezhilmalai	Pattali Makkal Katchi
1999	E. Ponnuswamy	Pattali Makkal Katchi
2004	E. Ponnuswamy	Pattali Makkal Katchi
2009	Thol. Thirumavalavan	Viduthalai Chiruthaigal Katchi
2014	M. Chandrakasi	All India Anna Dravida Munnetra Kazhagam
2019	Thol. Thirumavalavan	Viduthalai Chiruthaigal Katchi
2024	Thol. Thirumavalavan	Viduthalai Chiruthaigal Katchi

== Election results ==
Vote share of Winning candidates
2024	43.28%
2019	43.52%
2014	39.91%
2009	49.37%
2004	46.20%
1999	47.68%
1998	45.81%
1996	48.69%
1991	48.77%
1989	30.98%
1984	61.22%
1980	63.59%
1977	62.20%
1971	51.09%
1967	52.22%
1962	44.63%
1957	23.21%

=== General Elections 2024 ===
2024 Indian general election: Chidambaram
Party	Candidate	Votes	%	±%
VCK	Thol. Thirumavalavan	505,084	43.28	
AIADMK	M. Chandrahasan	4,01,530	34.40	
BJP	P. Karthiyayini	1,68,493	14.44	
NOTA	None of the above	8761	0.75	
Margin of victory		1,03,554	8.68	−
Turnout		11,67,071	77.00	
Registered electors		15,10,915		
VCK hold		Swing		

=== General Elections 2019 ===
2019 Indian general election: Chidambaram
Party	Candidate	Votes	%	±%
VCK	Thol. Thirumavalavan	500,229	43.52	+15.55
AIADMK	P. Chandrasekar	4,97,010	43.24	+3.33
Independent	A. Elavarasan	62,308	5.42	
NOTA	None of the above	15,535	1.35	0.22
MNM	T. Ravi	15,334	1.33	
Independent	P. Gurusamy	7,012	0.61	
Margin of victory		3,219	0.28	−11.66
Turnout		11,49,385	77.98	−1.13
Registered electors		14,80,222		8.35
VCK gain from AIADMK		Swing	+3.61	

=== General Elections 2014 ===
2014 Indian general election: Chidambaram
Party	Candidate	Votes	%	±%
AIADMK	M. Chandrakasi	429,536	39.91	
VCK	Thol. Thirumavalavan	3,01,041	27.97	−21.40
PMK	Sudha Manirathinem	2,79,016	25.92	−12.04
INC	P. Vallalperuman	28,988	2.69	
NOTA	None of the above	12,138	1.13	
Margin of victory		1,28,495	11.94	+0.53
Turnout		10,76,285	79.70	+1.70
Registered electors		13,66,190		+21.24
AIADMK gain from VCK		Swing	-9.46	

=== General Elections 2009 ===
2009 Indian general election: Chidambaram
Party	Candidate	Votes	%	±%
VCK	Thol. Thirumavalavan	428,804	49.37%	
PMK	E. Ponnuswamy	3,29,721	37.96%	−8.24%
DMDK	S. Sasikumar	66,283	7.63%	
Independent	V. Manikandan	9,799	1.13%	
Independent	R. P. Marutharajaa	8,367	0.96%	
Independent	N. Kaviyarasan	6,173	0.71%	
BSP	N. R. Rajendiran	5,718	0.66%	−0.03%
Margin of victory		99,083	11.41%	−0.38%
Turnout		8,68,614	77.18%	11.03%
Registered electors		11,26,828		0.12%
VCK gain from PMK		Swing	3.17%	

=== General Elections 2004 ===
2004 Indian general election: Chidambaram
Party	Candidate	Votes	%	±%
PMK	E. Ponnuswamy	343,424	46.20%	−1.48%
JD(U)	Thol. Thirumavalavan	2,55,773	34.41%	
BJP	D. Periasamy	1,13,974	15.33%	
Independent	D. Ramalingam	6,051	0.81%	
JP	P. Jawaharlal Nehru	5,526	0.74%	
BSP	K. Kumar	5,092	0.68%	
Margin of victory		87,651	11.79%	−4.72%
Turnout		7,43,410	66.09%	0.03%
Registered electors		11,25,487		1.37%
PMK hold		Swing	-1.48%	

=== General Elections 1999 ===
1999 Indian general election: Chidambaram
Party	Candidate	Votes	%	±%
PMK	E. Ponnuswamy	345,331	47.68%	1.87%
TMC(M)	Thol. Thirumavalavan	2,25,768	31.17%	
INC	T. Sumathi Udayakumar	1,50,794	20.82%	14.34%
Margin of victory		1,19,563	16.51%	15.31%
Turnout		7,24,305	66.02%	−4.67%
Registered electors		11,10,229		5.27%
PMK hold		Swing	-1.01%	

=== General Elections 1998 ===
1998 Indian general election: Chidambaram
Party	Candidate	Votes	%	±%
PMK	R. Ezhilmalai	305,372	45.81%	22.65%
DMK	C. V. Ganesan	2,97,417	44.62%	−4.07%
INC	P. Vallalperuman	43,214	6.48%	−14.44%
BSP	P. Nagappan	19,922	2.99%	
Margin of victory		7,955	1.19%	−24.34%
Turnout		6,66,594	64.87%	−5.82%
Registered electors		10,54,642		2.73%
PMK gain from DMK		Swing	-2.88%	

=== General Elections 1996 ===
1996 Indian general election: Chidambaram
Party	Candidate	Votes	%	±%
DMK	C. V. Ganesan	336,164	48.69%	21.73%
PMK	R. Ezhilmalai	1,59,898	23.16%	0.07%
INC	P. Vallalperuman	1,44,478	20.93%	−27.85%
CPI(M)	P. S. Mahalingam	28,646	4.15%	
BJP	S. P. Kirubanidhi	7,954	1.15%	
Independent	K. Selvamani	5,795	0.84%	
Margin of victory		1,76,266	25.53%	3.72%
Turnout		6,90,447	70.69%	1.23%
Registered electors		10,26,604		9.97%
DMK gain from INC		Swing	-0.08%	

=== General Elections 1991 ===
1991 Indian general election: Chidambaram
Party	Candidate	Votes	%	±%
INC	P. Vallalperuman	306,121	48.77%	17.80%
DMK	Sulochana Ayyasamy	1,69,231	26.96%	0.25%
PMK	R. Elumalai	1,44,946	23.09%	−0.78%
Margin of victory		1,36,890	21.81%	17.54%
Turnout		6,27,676	69.46%	−2.02%
Registered electors		9,33,507		−0.53%
INC hold		Swing	17.80%	

=== General Elections 1989 ===
1989 Indian general election: Chidambaram
Party	Candidate	Votes	%	±%
INC	P. Vallalperuman	205,229	30.98%	−30.24%
DMK	A. Ayyasamy	1,76,946	26.71%	−12.08%
PMK	R. Ezhilmalai	1,58,155	23.87%	
Humanist Party of India	C. A. Balakrishnan	1,20,197	18.14%	
Margin of victory		28,283	4.27%	−18.16%
Turnout		6,62,552	71.48%	−5.62%
Registered electors		9,38,462		27.85%
INC hold		Swing	-30.24%	

=== General Elections 1984 ===
1984 Indian general election: Chidambaram
Party	Candidate	Votes	%	±%
INC	P. Vallalperuman	329,892	61.22%	
DMK	S. Kannapiran	2,09,001	38.78%	−24.81%
Margin of victory		1,20,891	22.43%	−6.73%
Turnout		5,38,893	77.10%	6.95%
Registered electors		7,34,012		5.71%
INC gain from DMK		Swing	-2.37%	

=== General Elections 1980 ===
1980 Indian general election: Chidambaram
Party	Candidate	Votes	%	±%
DMK	V. Kulandaivelu	302,523	63.59%	25.79%
CPI(M)	S. Mahalingam	1,63,798	34.43%	
Independent	R. N. Duraiswamy	5,984	1.26%	
Independent	D. Duraivelavan	3,430	0.72%	
Margin of victory		1,38,725	29.16%	4.75%
Turnout		4,75,735	70.14%	0.86%
Registered electors		6,94,357		4.63%
DMK gain from AIADMK		Swing	1.39%	

=== General Elections 1977 ===
1977 Indian general election: Chidambaram
Party	Candidate	Votes	%	±%
AIADMK	A. Murugesan	278,406	62.20%	
DMK	N. Rajangam	1,69,172	37.80%	−13.30%
Margin of victory		1,09,234	24.41%	18.77%
Turnout		4,47,578	69.29%	−4.72%
Registered electors		6,63,634		19.69%
AIADMK gain from DMK		Swing	11.11%	

=== General Elections 1971 ===
1971 Indian general election: Chidambaram
Party	Candidate	Votes	%	±%
DMK	V. Mayavan	203,059	51.09%	−1.12%
INC(O)	L. Elayaperumal	1,80,661	45.46%	
Independent	A. Gavarnar	13,698	3.45%	
Margin of victory		22,398	5.64%	1.20%
Turnout		3,97,418	74.00%	−2.88%
Registered electors		5,54,449		5.69%
DMK hold		Swing	-1.12%	

=== General Elections 1967 ===
1967 Indian general election: Chidambaram
Party	Candidate	Votes	%	±%
DMK	V. Mayavan	205,193	52.22%	8.88%
INC	L. Elayaperumal	1,87,764	47.78%	3.15%
Margin of victory		17,429	4.44%	3.15%
Turnout		3,92,957	76.88%	5.36%
Registered electors		5,24,610		14.73%
DMK gain from INC		Swing	7.59%	

=== General Elections 1962 ===
1962 Indian general election: Chidambaram
Party	Candidate	Votes	%	±%
INC	R. Kanagasabai Pillai	140,731	44.63%	21.42%
DMK	R. Thillaivaillalan	1,36,671	43.34%	
SWA	D. Govindasami Kachirayar	18,021	5.71%	
Independent	A. Subramaniam	10,249	3.25%	
Independent	A. Rathinam	9,666	3.07%	
Margin of victory		4,060	1.29%	1.17%
Turnout		3,15,338	71.53%	−19.01%
Registered electors		4,57,267		−45.56%
INC hold		Swing	21.42%	

=== General Elections 1957 ===
1957 Indian general election: Chidambaram
Party	Candidate	Votes	%	±%
INC	R. Kanagasabai Pillai	176,501	23.21%	
INC	Elayaperumal	1,75,589	23.09%	
Independent	Arumugham	1,18,491	15.58%	
Independent	Dandapani Padyachai	1,09,521	14.40%	
Independent	Kulandai Moopan	85,943	11.30%	
Independent	Kattimuthu	62,114	8.17%	
Independent	Kaliamurthi	32,381	4.26%	
Independent	Siva Subrananian	0	0.00%	
Margin of victory		912	0.12%	
Turnout		7,60,540	90.54%	
Registered electors		8,40,006		
INC win (new seat)				

== See also ==
- Chidambaram
- List of constituencies of the Lok Sabha
- Ariyalur
