= K. Tamil Azhagan =

Indian politician

K. Tamil Azhagan is an Indian politician and former member of the Tamil Nadu Legislative Assembly from the Tittakudi constituency, represented the Desiya Murpokku Dravidar Kazhagam party. In 2024, he joined the Bharatiya Janata Party in the presence of Tamil Nadu BJP chief K. Annamalai and Rajeev Chandrasekhar.
