= M. Babu =

Indian politician

Member of the Tamil Nadu Legislative Assembly
- In office 12 May 2021 – 6 May 2026
- Preceded by: R. T. Arasu
- Succeeded by: E. Rajasekar
- Constituency: Cheyyur

Personal details
- Party: Dravida Munnetra Kazhagam

M. Babu, also known as Panaiyur Babu, is an Indian Politician Member of Legislative Assembly of Tamil Nadu. He was elected from Cheyyur as a Viduthalai Chiruthaigal Katchi candidate in 2021.

== Electoral performance ==
2021 Tamil Nadu Legislative Assembly election : Cheyyur
Party	Candidate	Votes	%	±%
VCK	M. Babu	82,750	46.49%	▲35.89
AIADMK	S. Kanitha Sampath	78,708	44.22%	▲6.89
NTK	R. Rajesh	9,653	5.42%	▲4.88
DMDK	A. Siva	3,054	1.72%	New
MNM	P. Anbu Tamilsekaran	1,968	1.11%	New
NOTA	None of the above	1,141	0.64%	▼0.44
Margin of victory		4,042	2.27%	▲2.09
Turnout		179,351	78.85%	▼1.30
Total valid votes		177,979		
Rejected ballots		231	0.13%	▲0.08
Registered electors		227,468		▲7.74
VCK gain from DMK		Swing	▲8.98	
