= Viduthalai Chiruthaigal Katchi =

- Abbreviation: VCK
- Chairperson: Thol. Thirumavalavan
- General Secretary: D. Ravikumar
- Founder: M. Malalchami, D. Amukurajah
- Founded: 1982
- Split from: Dalit Panthers
- Ideology: Social Justice; Ambedkarism; Marxism; Secularism; Tamil nationalism Dravidianism
- Political position: Left-wing
- Colours: Blue; Red
- ECI status: State Party
- Alliance: National Alliance INDIA (since 2023); Regional Alliances SSJVA (Tamil Nadu and Puducherry); Former Alliances: UPA (2006–2013, 2017–2023) (till dissolved)) (National); SPA (2019–2026); Democratic Progressive Alliance (2006–2015, 2017–2019); National Democratic Alliance (2001–2003) (India); Democratic People Alliance (2006) (Tamil Nadu); Janata Dal (United) Alliance (2004) (Tamil Nadu); Makkal Nala Koottani (2015–2016) (Tamil Nadu); TMC+ (1999–2001) (Tamil Nadu)
- Seats in Rajya Sabha: 0 / 245
- Seats in Lok Sabha: 2 / 543
- Seats in Tamil Nadu Legislative Assembly: 2 / 234
- Number of states and union territories in government: 1 / 31

Election symbol
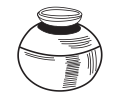
- Clay Pot

Party flag
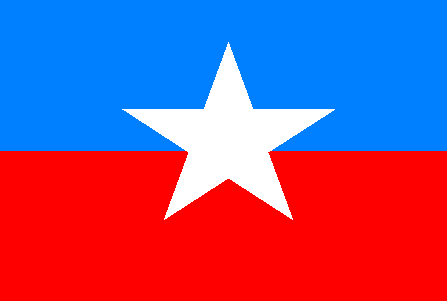

Viduthalai Chiruthaigal Katchi (transl. Liberation Panther Party; abbr. VCK) (விடுதலைச் சிறுத்தைகள் கட்சி), formerly known as the Dalit Panthers of India or the Dalit Panthers Iyyakkam (transl. Dalit Panthers Movement; abbr. DPI), is an Indian social movement and political party that seeks to combat caste based discrimination, active in the state of Tamil Nadu. The party also has a strong emphasis on Tamil nationalism. Its chair is Thol. Thirumavalavan, a lawyer from Chennai, and its general secretary is the writer Ravikumar.

== History ==
The Dalit Panthers Iyyakkam was formed in 1982 in Madurai, Tamil Nadu. The group was found to seek protection of Dalits from caste-related violence. Founded by a group of disaffected Dalits under the leadership of M. Malalchami, it emerged as a loosely organised group of local activists seeking assistance and protection through the association of a larger movement. The movement was inspired by the Dalit Panthers of India, a social movement which itself had formed earlier in the 1970s in Maharashtra which itself was inspired by the Black Panther Party, a socialist movement that sought to combat racial discrimination in the United States.

In 1989, after the death of the founder of Dalit Panthers of India (DPI), Thirumavalavan became its leader. In the 1990s the party grew by highlighting discrimination and caste-based violence. In 1999, VCK contested elections for the first time.

VCK was allotted different election symbols in every election. In 2014, Madras HC ordered the Election Commission of India to consider VCK's request for star as their election symbol.

== Party principles ==
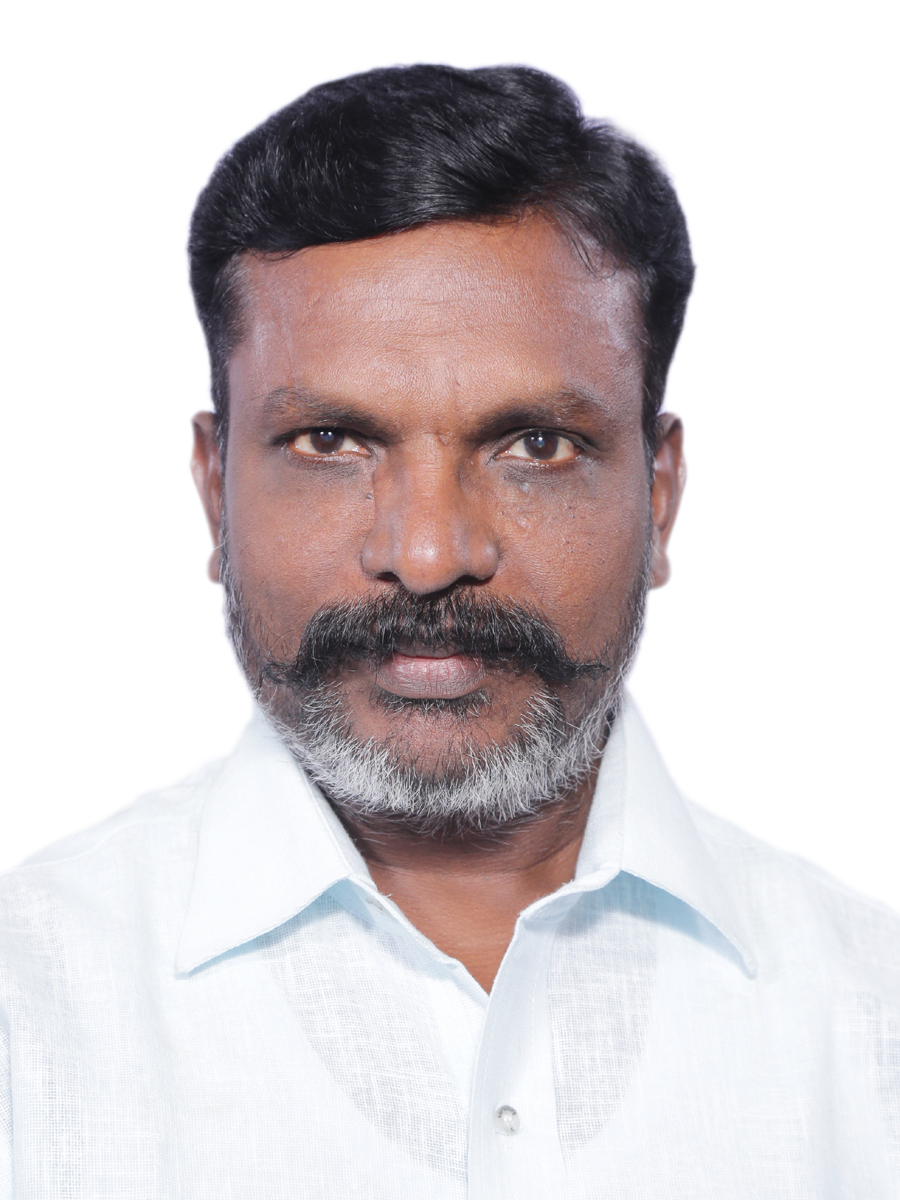
Thol. Thirumavalavan, Leader and President of Viduthalai Chiruthaigal Katchi

The main aim of the party is to abolish the differences among Tamil people and to lift up the socio-economically weaker sections of society. The party supported the freedom movement of Tamil people in Tamil Eelam, as well as the security of Tamil people living abroad. The party also declared that Mahinda Rajapaksa should be charged with war crimes for the alleged assassination of thousands of innocent Tamil people during war against the Liberation Tigers of Tamil Eelam. In the Parliament of India in May 2012, Thirumavalavan joined other leaders and raised issue of the Ambedkar cartoon, sparking a controversy in Parliament.

Ahead of the 2016 Tamil Nadu Assembly elections, Thirumavalavan stated his willingness to form a coalition with any party apart from the DMK, AIADMK, BJP and PMK.

== Tamil Eelam ==
VCK formed Tamil Eelam Supporters Organization (TESO) along with DMK, DK, NTK, and demonstrated protests demanding credential probe into war time crimes against the Sri Lankan government during the war between the Tamil Tigers and the Sri Lankan government. Thousands of innocent Tamil people were brutally tortured and murdered during the war. Many countries raised complaints against the Sri Lankan government in the United Nations International Criminal Court of Justice. VCK demanded that former Sri Lankan President Rajapakse should be charged with war crimes. Many of its party men were arrested by Tamil Nadu police for creating public discomfort during protests against the Sri Lankan government. The party is heavily criticised for supporting LTTE and its leader Prabakaran, since LTTE is banned in India.

VCK is accused of promoting Tamil nationalism and supporting the banned group Liberation Tigers of Tamil Eelam. Although major Tamil political parties DMK and ADMK both are accused of indirectly supporting LTTE, VCK is accused of supporting LTTE leader openly in its party posters. The LTTE was involved in the assassination of former Indian prime minister Rajiv Gandhi. VCK Party has demanded the premature release of the assassination convicts along with major Tamil parties like NTK, MDMK, PMK, SMK, AIADMK and DMK. It has also celebrated the birth day of slain LTTE leader Prabakaran along with other Tamil parties.

== Controversies ==
In April 2019, members of the RSS affiliated, Hindutva group Hindu Munnani broke an earthen pot, the election symbol of VCK at the village of Ponparappi, Ariyalur block, Tiruchi. The incident happened in front of the Panchayat Office where the Tamil Nadu general election polling was going on which lead to a quarrel. This is said to have resulted a retaliatory violence against the Dalits. The Hindu reported a mob of 100 engaged in violence against the Dalits and at least 20 tiled houses which had the VCK symbol were totally damaged. A. Kathir of Evidence, a rights organisation based in Madurai claimed 13 people were admitted at hospitals, 25 houses were fully damaged and 115 houses were damaged. Tirumavalavan after visiting the area, told the media that the PMK and Hindu Munnani were responsible for the violence.

In December 2022, VCK protested the saffronisation of Dr B.R. Ambedkar, the architect of the secular Indian Constitution.

== Electoral performance ==
=== Lok Sabha Elections ===
Year	Seats won	Percentage of votes	Remarks
1999	0 / 2	-	As Tamil Maanila Congress candidates
2004	0 / 8	-	As Janata Dal (United) candidates
2009	1 / 2	0.18%	
2014	0 / 2	0.11%	
2019	2 / 2	0.8%	Ravikumar (writer) contested in Dravida Munnetra Kazhagam symbol
2024	2 / 2	2.25%	

=== Tamil Nadu Legislative Assembly elections ===
Year	Assembly	Seats contested	Seats won	(+/-) in seats	% of votes	Vote swing	Popular vote	Alliance	Outcome
2001	12th	8 (Note: Since VCK contested the election using the DMK symbol, the Election Commission officially recorded those candidates as DMK candidates. However, the vote share and seat share attributed to VCK are calculated based on the constituencies where VCK members were fielded under the DMK symbol.)	1 / 234	▲1	1.29%	New entry	3,61,012	DMK+	Opposition
2006	13th	9	2 / 234	▲1	1.29%	Steady	4,26,321	AIADMK+	Opposition
2011	14th	10	0 / 234	▼2	1.51%	▲0.22	5,55,965	DMK+	Lost
2016	15th	25	0 / 234	Steady	0.77%	▼0.74	3,31,849	MNK	Lost
2021	16th	6	4 / 234	▲4	0.99%	▲0.22	4,57,763	SPA	Government
2026	17th	8	2 / 234	▼2	1.09%	▲0.10	5,40,056	SPA	Government

== List of Elected Representatives ==
=== Lok Sabha ===
Year	Election	Member	Constituency	Remarks					
Year	Election	Member	Constituency	Remarks	2009	15th Lok Sabha	Thol. Thirumavalavan	Chidambaram	1st Term
2019	17th Lok Sabha	Thol. Thirumavalavan	Chidambaram	2nd Term					
2019	17th Lok Sabha	D. Ravikumar	Viluppuram	Contested on DMK symbol					
2024	18th Lok Sabha	Thol. Thirumavalavan	Chidambaram	3rd Term					
2024	18th Lok Sabha	D. Ravikumar	Viluppuram	2nd Term					

=== Member of Legislative Assembly ===
Year	Assembly	Constituency	MLA Name	Remarks					
Year	Assembly	Constituency	MLA Name	Remarks	2001	12th	Mangalore (SC)	Thol. Thirumavalavan	Contested on DMK symbol
2006	13th	Kattumannarkoil (SC)	D. Ravikumar						
2006	13th	Mangalore (SC)	K. Selvaperunthagai						
2021	16th	Thiruporur	S. S. Balaji						
2021	16th	Cheyyur (SC)	M. Babu						
2021	16th	Kattumannarkoil (SC)	Sinthanai Selvan						
2021	16th	Nagapattinam	Aloor Shanavas						
2026	17th	Kattumannarkoil (SC)	L. E. Jothimani						
2026	17th	Tindivanam (SC)	Vanni Arasu						

== See also ==
- List of political parties in India
