= N. Murugumaran =

Indian politician

N. Murugumaran is an Indian politician and Former member of the Tamil Nadu Legislative Assembly from the Kattumannarkoil constituency. He represents the All India Anna Dravida Munnetra Kazhagam party. He has won 2 times in Kattumamnarkoil Assembly Constituency in 2011 and 2016 Assembly Elections.
