= P. Vallalperuman =

Indian politician

- Born: 1949/1950
- Died: 29 November 2017 (aged 67)
- Occupation: Politician
- Children: 1

Dr.P. Vallalperuman was an Indian politician and former Member of Parliament elected from Tamil Nadu. Professionally, he was a physician. He was elected to the Lok Sabha from Chidambaram constituency as an Indian National Congress candidate in the 1984, 1989 and 1991 elections. He died at the age of 67 in November 2017 from a heart illness.
