= Tuti-Melur railway station =

Railway Station in Thoothukkudi

Tuti-Melur Railway Station Tūttukkuṭi-Mēlūr Rayil Nilaiyam

General information
- Location: Meelavittan Salai, Thoothukkudi – 628002, Tamil Nadu, India.
- Coordinates: 8°48′34.45″N 78°8′21.59″E
- System: Indian Railways
- Owner: Ministry of Railways
- Operator: Indian Railways
- Line: Tuticorin–Vanchi Maniyachchi line
- Platforms: 2
- Tracks: 2
- Train operators: Southern Railway
- Connections: Bus, Taxi and Auto Rickshaw

Construction
- Structure type: At-grade
- Platform levels: 1
- Accessible: Yes

Other information
- Status: Functioning
- Station code: TME
- Zone(s): Southern Railway Zone
- Division(s): Madurai
- Classification: HG-2

History
- Opened: 27 May 2023; 3 years ago
Location

Tuti-Melur Railway Station (station code: TME) is a halt on the railway in the city of Thoothukkudi, Tamil Nadu, India. It is located in the heart of the city, at Meelavittan Salai. It comes under the Madurai railway division of the Southern Railway Zone and is one of the railway termini in the city.

It is located opposite Thoothukkudi New Bus Stand and at a distance of about 2.1 km (1.3 mi) from Perarignar Anna Bus Terminus, about 2.1 km (1.3 mi) from Tuticorin Railway Station, and about 16.9 km (10.5 mi) from Thoothukudi Airport.

== History ==
The station was established to enhance railway facilities in Thoothukkudi and to provide a convenient stopping point closer to the urban centre. Situated near the Thoothukkudi New Bus Stand, the station officially opened on 27 May 2023.

The station offers an additional railway facility for the city's residents and for passengers using the adjacent bus terminus.

== Infrastructure and facilities ==
The station features two platforms and two railway tracks, with the railway line being electrified and functioning as a double-line section.

It includes a computerised booking office for passenger ticketing, as well as designated waiting areas and seating facilities. Stone benches are available on both platforms, situated in open areas and within covered waiting sheds that offer shelter for passengers.

== Train stopping time ==
S. No.	Train No.	Train Name	Source	Destination	Halt on							Train timings		
S. No.	Train No.	Train Name	Source	Destination	M	T	W	T	F	S	S	Arrival time	Departure time	Halt time
1	12693	Pearl City Super Fast Express	Chennai Egmore (MS)	Tuticorin (TN)	✓	✓	✓	✓	✓	✓	✓	05:09	05:10	1 minute
2	12694	Pearl City Super Fast Express	Tuticorin (TN)	Chennai Egmore (MS)	✓	✓	✓	✓	✓	✓	✓	21:10	21:11	1 minute
3	16235	Tuticorin – Mysuru Express	Tuticorin (TN)	Mysuru Junction (MYS)	✓	✓	✓	✓	✓	✓	✓	17:34	17:35	1 minute
4	16765	Mettupalayam – Tuticorin Biweekly Express	Mettupalayam (MTP)	Tuticorin (TN)	✓	✗	✗	✗	✗	✓	✗	03:34	03:35	1 minute
5	16766	Tuticorin – Mettupalayam Biweekly Express	Tuticorin (TN)	Mettupalayam (MTP)	✗	✗	✗	✓	✗	✓	✗	23:45	23:46	1 minute
6	16791	Palaruvi Express	Tuticorin (TN)	Palakkad Junction (PGT)	✓	✓	✓	✓	✓	✓	✓	21:44	21:45	1 minute
7	16792	Palaruvi Express	Palakkad Junction (PGT)	Tuticorin (TN)	✓	✓	✓	✓	✓	✓	✓	05:39	05:40	1 minute
8	19567	Vivek Express	Tuticorin (TN)	Okha (OKHA)	✗	✗	✗	✗	✗	✗	✓	23:45	23:46	1 minute
9	19568	Vivek Express	Okha (OKHA)	Tuticorin (TN)	✗	✗	✗	✗	✗	✗	✓	00:19	00:20	1 minute

== Connectivity ==
The station is well-integrated into Thoothukkudi's road network, with its strategic location opposite the Thoothukkudi New Bus Stand facilitating easy access to both local and intercity bus services.

In the vicinity of the station, auto-rickshaws and taxis are readily available, while local bus services connect various parts of the city.

== See also ==
- Thoothukudi Airport
- Transport in Thoothukudi
- Tuticorin Railway Station
- Perarignar Anna Bus Terminus
- V.O. Chidambaranar Port Authority
