= Perarignar Anna Bus Terminus, Thoothukkudi =

Bus Terminus in Thoothukkudi

Perarignar Anna Bus Terminus Pēraṟiñar Aṇṇā Pēruntu Nilaiyam

General information
- Location: Meenakshipuram Pradhana Salai, Thoothukkudi – 628002, Tamil Nadu, India.
- Coordinates: 8°48′13.284″N 78°8′25.4652″E
- System: Local and Mofussil Bus Station
- Owner: Thoothukkudi City Municipal Corporation
- Operator: Tamil Nadu State Transport Corporation Ltd.
- Platforms: 1 (29 bays)
- Connections: Taxi Stand and Auto Rickshaw Stand

Construction
- Structure type: At-grade
- Parking: Available
- Accessible: Yes

Other information
- Status: Functioning
- Fare zone: Tamil Nadu State Transport Corporation (Tirunelveli) Ltd.

History
- Opened: 8 October 2023; 2 years ago
Location

Perarignar Anna Bus Terminus is a central bus terminus in the city of Thoothukkudi, Tamil Nadu, India. It is located in the heart of the city, at Meenakshipuram Pradhana Salai. It comes under the Tamil Nadu State Transport Corporation (Tirunelveli) Ltd. division and is one of the bus termini in the city, built with extraordinary infrastructure and profuse facilities. It was named after the former chief minister of Tamil Nadu C. N. Annadurai, who was popularly called Perarignar Anna. The bus terminus provides local and mofussil services by connecting to the different parts of Thoothukkudi via town bus, the places surrounding Tiruchendur, and Tirunelveli via city bus. It is at a distance of about 1.8 km (1.1 mi) from Thoothukkudi New Bus Stand, about 2.1 km (1.3 mi) from Tuti-Melur Railway Station, about 2.5 km (1.6 mi) from Tuticorin Railway Station, and about 16.1 km (10.0 mi) from Thoothukudi Airport.

== Timeline ==
On 16 February 2019, the foundation stone was laid for the construction of the bus terminus by the minister for information and publicity of Tamil Nadu Kadambur C. Raju, presided over by the member of parliament J. Jayasingh Thiyagaraj Natterjee, in the presence of the former ministers of Tamil Nadu P. Geetha Jeevan and S. T. Chellapandian.

On 8 October 2023, the bus terminus was opened by the minister for municipal administration of Tamil Nadu K. N. Nehru, presided over by the member of parliament Kanimozhi Karunanidhi, in the presence of the minister for social welfare and women empowerment of Tamil Nadu P. Geetha Jeevan, the minister for fisheries, fishermen welfare, and animal husbandry of Tamil Nadu Anitha R. Radhakrishnan, and the mayor of the Thoothukkudi City Municipal Corporation P. Jegan.

On 11 October 2023, after the inauguration ceremony, the bus terminus was opened for the public to use the bus service from there after completing its final touches and some official works.

== Building details ==
The size of the land earmarked for the project is 3.36 acres. The total built-up area is 13,630 square metres with a single platform, and the height of the building is 25.3 metres. It was built under the smart cities mission scheme for the expenditure of ₹58.67 crore. It was built with a ground and four floors, which used the specific measurement of space for each floor: 5750 square metres on the ground floor, 4856 square metres on the first and second floors, 2380 square metres on the third floor, and 260 square metres on the fourth floor.

== Bay and destination ==
The bus terminus has 29 bays on its semi-circled single platform.

Bay Number	Destination	District
1	New Harbour	Thoothukkudi
2	New Harbour (Camp - I)	Thoothukkudi
3	Thermal Power Station (Camp - II)	Thoothukkudi
4	Arumugamangalam (Kovankadu)	Thoothukkudi
5	Kurumbur (Via Authoor)	Thoothukkudi
6	Kulayankarisal	Thoothukkudi
7	Eral (Via Sawyerpuram)	Thoothukkudi
8	Mela Sekkarakudi	Thoothukkudi
9	Sekkarakudi	Thoothukkudi
10	Vadakku Silukkanpatti / Perurani	Thoothukkudi
11	Sokkalingapuram (Via Thattaparai)	Thoothukkudi
12	Tirunelveli	Tirunelveli
13	Tirunelveli	Tirunelveli
14	Tirunelveli	Tirunelveli
15	Tirunelveli	Tirunelveli
16	Puthiamputhur (Via Thattaparai)	Thoothukkudi
17	Keelavaippar	Thoothukkudi
18	Kulathur / Subramaniapuram	Thoothukkudi
19	Keelamudiman (Via Puthiamputhur)	Thoothukkudi
20	Vellaram / Governagiri	Thoothukkudi
21	Ottapidaram (Via Kurukkuchalai)	Thoothukkudi
22	Pasuvanthanai	Thoothukkudi
23	Sathankulam	Thoothukkudi
24	Nazareth	Thoothukkudi
25	Tiruvaikuntam (Via Sawyerpuram)	Thoothukkudi
26	Route: Mukkani / Eral	Thoothukkudi
27	Tiruchendur	Thoothukkudi
28	Tiruchendur	Thoothukkudi
29	Kulasekarapattinam	Thoothukkudi

== Salient features ==
The bus terminus has allotted spacious places for the passengers convenience. It is equipped with a large number of seats in the waiting hall, a mother-feeding room, a cloak room, a ticket booking office, a police control room, an electrical room, and ATMs for the use of passengers in the bus terminus. It was also facilitated by two lifts for the passengers to easily access all the floors.

Parking

The bus terminus comprises space for parking vehicles; there are parking spaces for 384 two-wheelers on the first floor and parking spaces for 45 four-wheelers on the second floor of the bus terminus.

Shops

The bus terminus has a total of 115 shops: 36 on the ground floor, 43 on the first floor, 19 on the second floor, 17 on the third floor, and restaurants and other amenities on the fourth floor of the bus terminus.

Water filter

A well-equipped reverse osmosis water filter has been installed at the bus terminus for the use of passengers, which provides clean and plenty of water.

High Masts

There are four high masts set up in the necessary places at the bus terminus to diffuse the best lighting on its premises.

Restrooms

The bus terminus is equipped with clean and tidy restrooms separate for men, women, and specially challenged people on every floor of the building.

== See also ==
- Thoothukudi Airport
- Tuticorin Railway Station
- Transport in Thoothukudi
- Tuti-Melur Railway Station
- V.O. Chidambaranar Port Authority
