= Kacheguda–Tuticorin Express =

Train in India

Kacheguda - Tuticorin Express

Overview
- Service type: Express
- Locale: Telangana, Andhra Pradesh & Tamil Nadu
- First service: 6 April 2026; 3 months ago
- Current operator: South Central (SCR)

Route
- Termini: Kacheguda (KCG); Tuticorin (TN)
- Stops: 35
- Distance travelled: 1,446 km (899 mi)
- Average journey time: 31 hrs 40 mins
- Service frequency: Weekly
- Train number: 17615 / 17616

On-board services
- Classes: General Unreserved, Sleeper Class, AC 1 Tier, AC 2 Tier, AC 3 Tier
- Seating arrangements: Yes
- Sleeping arrangements: Yes
- Catering facilities: On-board Catering
- Observation facilities: Large windows
- Baggage facilities: No
- Other facilities: Below the seats

Technical
- Rolling stock: LHB coach
- Track gauge: 1,676 mm (5 ft 6 in)
- Operating speed: 130 km/h (81 mph) maximum, 46 km/h (29 mph) average including halts.
Route map
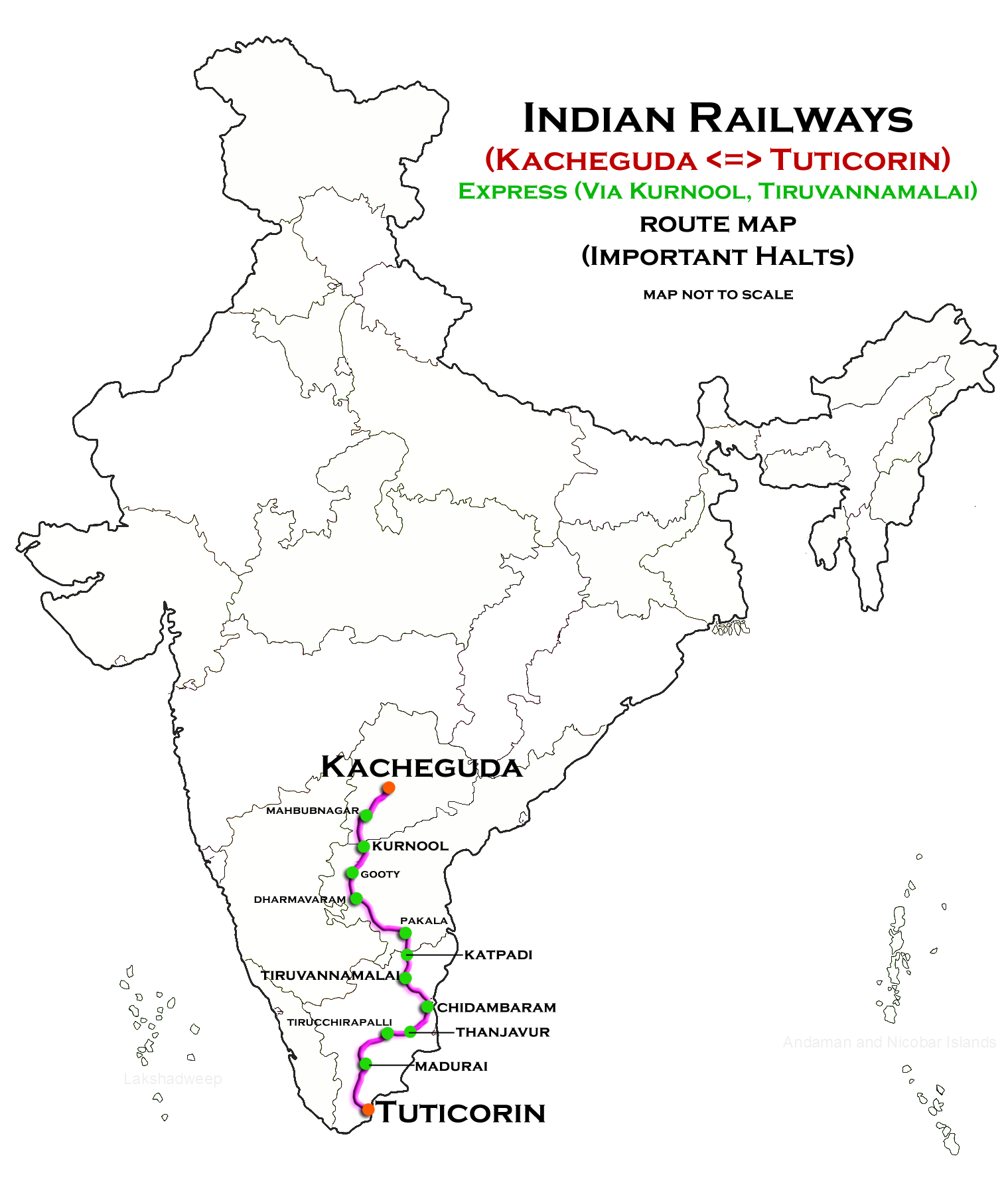

The 17615 / 17616 Kacheguda–Tuticorin Express is an express train belonging to South Central Railway zone that runs between the city Kacheguda of Telangana and Tuticorin of Tamil Nadu in India.

It operates as train number 17615 from Kacheguda to Tuticorin and as train number 17616 in the reverse direction, serving the states of Tamil Nadu, Andhra Pradesh and Telangana.

== Services ==
• 17615/ Kacheguda–Tuticorin Express has an average speed of 51 km/h and covers 1446 km in 28h 15m.

• 17616/ Tuticorin–Kacheguda Express has an average speed of 49 km/h and covers 1446 km in 29h 45m.

== Routes and halts ==
The Important Halts of the train are :

- Kacheguda
- Shadnagar
- Jadcherla
- Mahbubnagar
- Wanaparthy
- Gadwal Junction
- Kurnool City
- Dhone Junction
- Gooty Junction
- Anantapur
- Dharamavaram Junction
- Kadiri
- Madanpalle Road
- Pileru
- Pakala Junction
- Chittoor
- Katpadi Junction
- Vellore Cantonment
- Tiruvannamalai
- Villupuram Junction
- Panruti
- Cuddalore Port Junction
- Chidambaram
- Srikazhi
- Mayiladuthurai Junction
- Kumbakonam
- Papanasam
- Thanjavur Junction
- Tiruchchirappalli Junction
- Dindigul Junction
- Madurai Junction
- Virudhunagar Junction
- Satur
- Kovilpatti
- Tuticorin

== Schedule ==
• 17615 - 3:00 PM (Monday) [Kacheguda]

• 17616 - 07:40 AM (Wednesday) [Tuticorin]

== Coach Composition ==
1. General Unreserved - 4
2. Sleeper Class - 6
3. AC 1st Class - 1
4. AC 2nd Class - 3
5. AC 3rd Class - 5

== Traction ==
As the entire route is fully electrified it is hauled by a Lallaguda Loco Shed-based WAP-7 electric locomotive from Kacheguda to Tuticorin and vice versa.

== Rake share ==
The train will rake sharing with Murdeshwar–Kacheguda Superfast Express (12789/12790).

== See also ==
Trains from Kacheguda :

1. Kacheguda–Madurai Weekly Express
2. Ajanta Express
3. Kacheguda–Yesvantpur Vande Bharat Express
4. Guntur–Kacheguda AC Double Decker Express
5. Kacheguda–Nagercoil Weekly Express

Trains from Tuticorin :

1. Mysuru–Tuticorin Express
2. Okha–Tuticorin Vivek Express
3. Coimbatore–Tuticorin Link Express
4. Chennai Egmore–Tuticorin Link Express
5. Pearl City Express

== Notes ==
a. Runs a day in a week with both directions.
