= Transport in Thoothukudi =

Thoothukudi is an Industrial City and it has transport connections via road, rail, sea and air. After Chennai, Thoothukudi is the only city in Tamil Nadu to have all four means of transport.

== Roadways ==
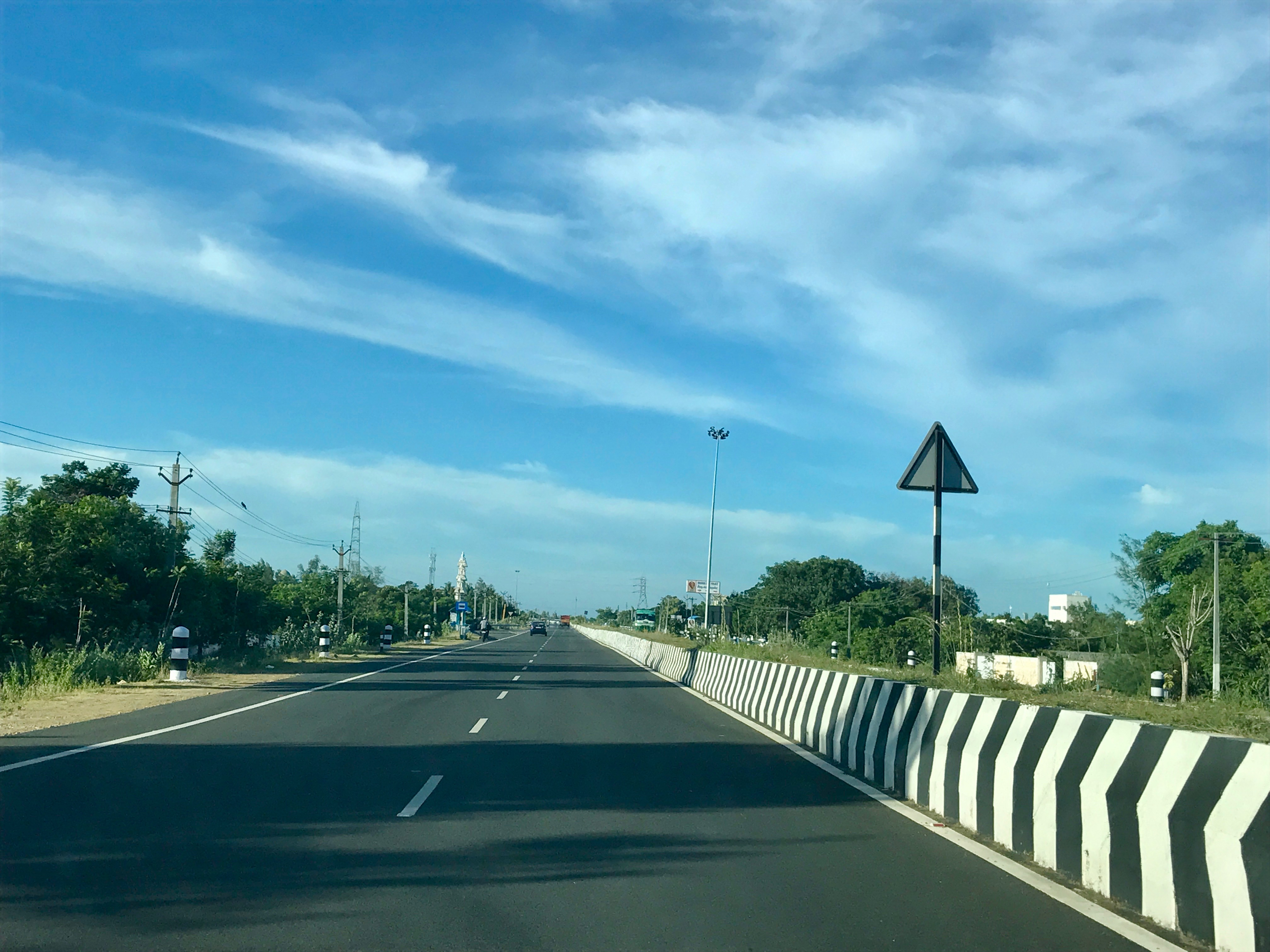
Thoothukudi – Ramanathapuram - Chennai ECR

Thoothukudi City is well connected by road. The Major Highways are,

- Thoothukudi– Madurai– Tiruchirappalli– Viluppuram- Vellore (NH-38)
- Thoothukudi– Tirunelveli (NH-138)
- Thoothukudi– Ramanathapuram- Nagapattinam- Puducherry- Tindivanam- Chengalpattu- Chennai (NH-32)
- Thoothukudi– Palayakayal– Tiruchendur- Kudankulam- Kanyakumari (SH-176)
- Tiruchendur– Sathankulam–Valliyur- Nagercoil (SH-93 & NH-44)
- Tiruchendur - Alwarthirunagari - Tirunelveli ( SH -40)
- Srinagar to Kaniyakumari - ( via kovilpatti, Kayathar ) ( NH 44)
- Thoothukudi - Vagaikulam - Tiruvaikundam - Nazareth - Sathankulam (SH 93, SH 40, NH 138)

== Railways ==
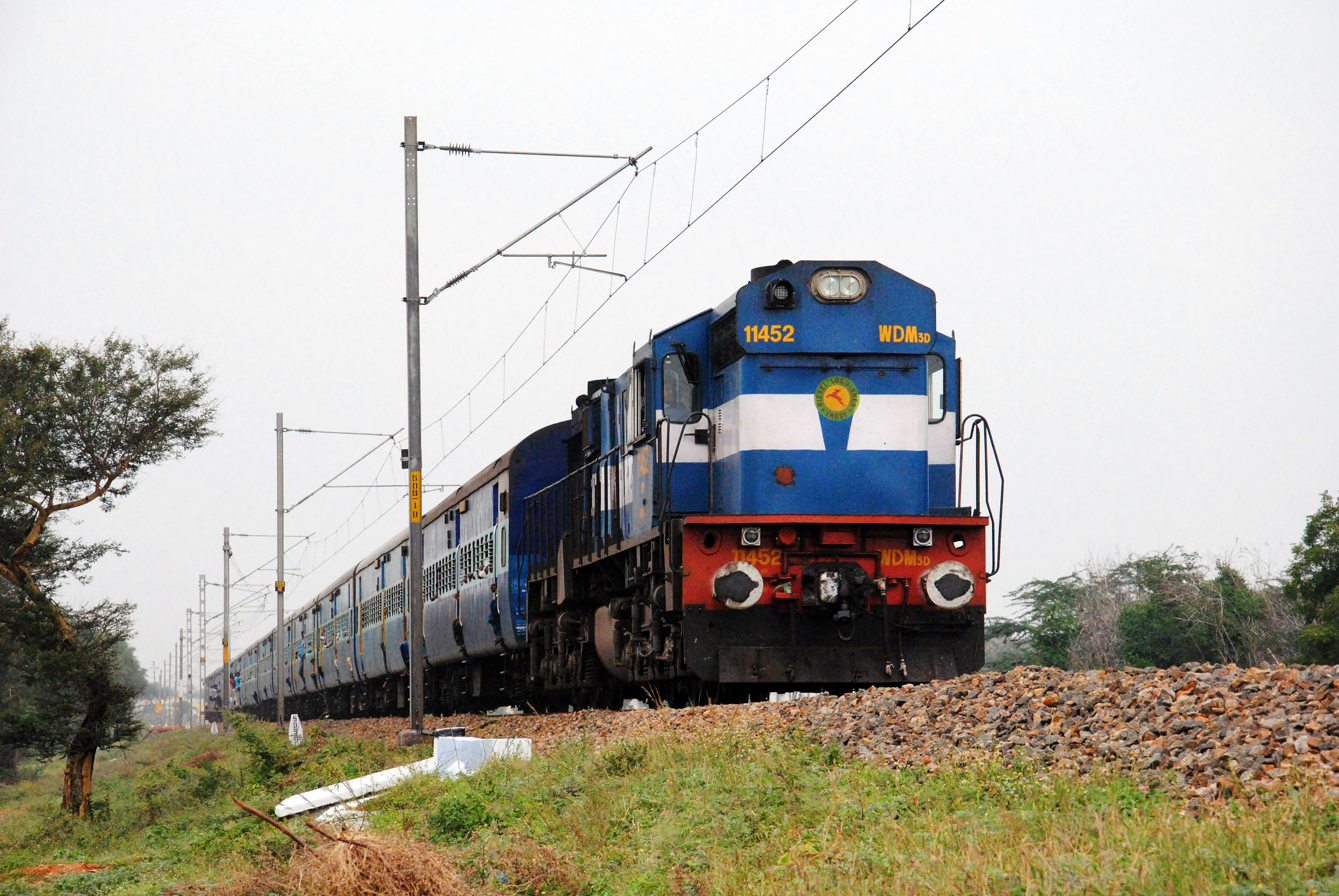
Thoothukudi Railway Station

Thoothukudi railway station is one of the oldest railway stations in India and South Indian Railway began a Madras – Thoothukudi service connecting with the boat to Ceylon in 1899. The station was declared as Model Station in 2007 and several infrastructure developments are in process. There is also another station, known as Tuti-Melur. It has suburban stations such as:

SL no.	Station	Code
1	Tuticorin (Main Railway Station)	TN
2	Tuti-Melur	TME
3	Milavittan	MVN

== Airport ==
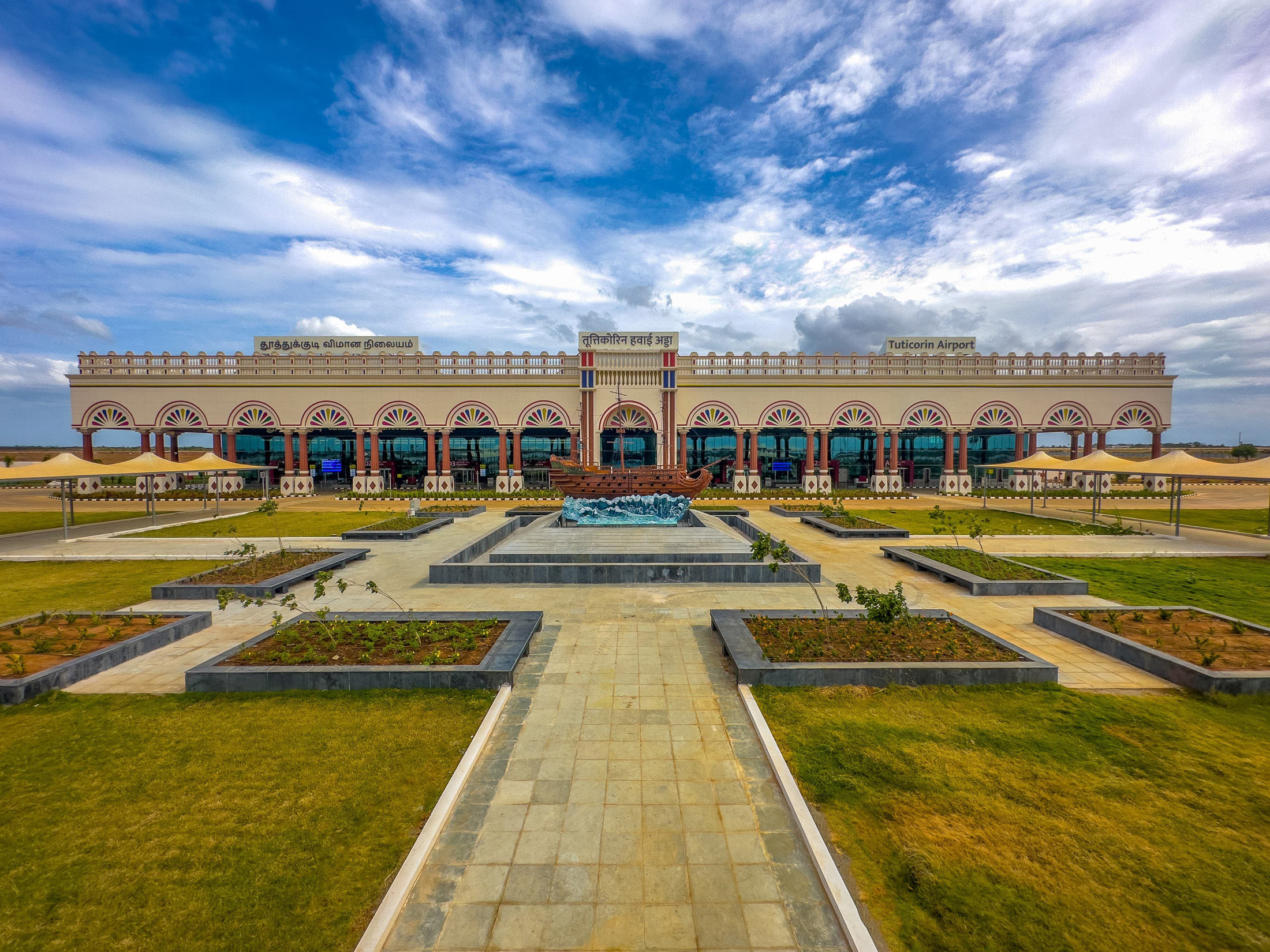
Thoothukudi Airport
One of the domestic airports in India

Thoothukudi Airport (IATA: TCR, ICAO: VOTK) is one of the domestic airports in India serving Thoothukkudi, the sea gateway of the Indian state of Tamil Nadu. It is located at Vagaikulam in Thoothukkudi district, situated 16.1 km (10.0 mi) southwest from the city centre on National Highway 7A. It is owned by the Ministry of Civil Aviation of the Republic of India and operated by the Airports Authority of India. On 13 April 2018, the airport was certified with ISO 9001:2015 quality.

IndiGo is operating 4 direct daily flights to Chennai and 1 direct daily flight to Bengaluru.

The nearest international airport is Thiruvananthapuram International Airport in Kerala, which is about 182 km (113 mi) by road.

Airlines	Destinations
IndiGo	Bengaluru, Chennai

== Seaport ==
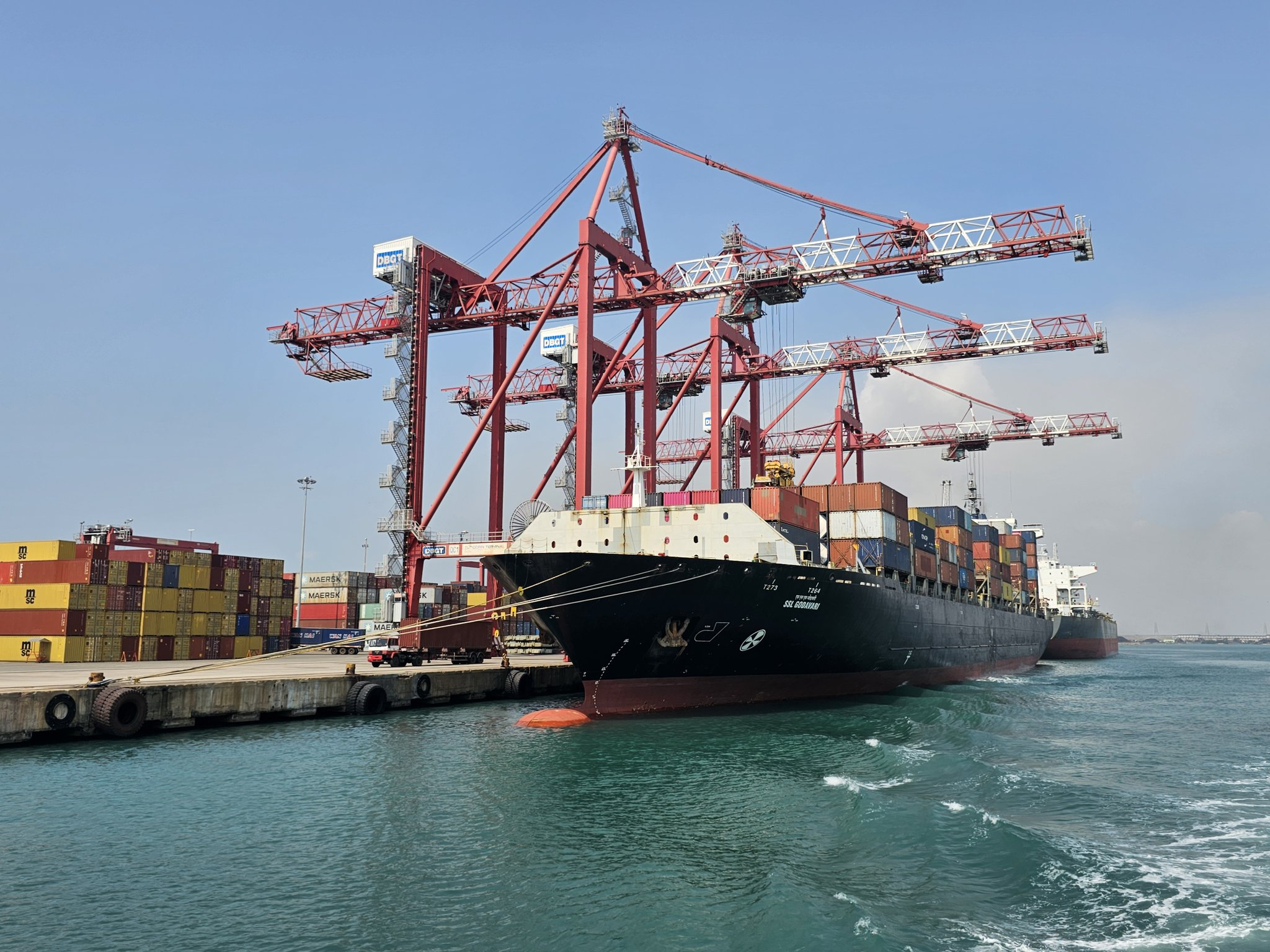
V.O. Chidambaranar Port Authority
One of the major ports in India

V.O. Chidambaranar Port Authority is one of the 12 major ports in India. It was declared to be a major port on 11 July 1974. It is the second largest port in Tamil Nadu and the third largest container terminal in India. V.O. Chidambaranar Port is an artificial port. It is the third international port in Tamil Nadu, and it is the second all-weather port.

As a mark of paying tribute to the legendary freedom fighter V. O. Chidambaranar, who plied the first swadeshi ship from Thoothukkudi to Colombo in 1907, Tuticorin Port Trust was renamed as V.O. Chidambaranar Port Trust. Consequent to the repeal of the Major Port Trust Act, 1963, on 3 November 2021, V.O. Chidambaranar Port Trust was renamed as V.O. Chidambaranar Port Authority. The port is located strategically close to the East-West International sea routes on the southeastern coast of India, and it is located in the Gulf of Mannar, with Sri Lanka in the southeast and the large landmass of India in the west; it is also well sheltered from the fury of storms and cyclone winds.

It is the only port in South India to provide a direct weekly container service to the United States (transit time 22 days). There are regular weekly direct services to Europe (transit time 17 days), China (transit time 10 days) and the Red Sea (transit time 8 days).

== Spaceport ==
The construction of the SSLV Launch Complex (SLC) facilities at Kulasekarapattinam in Thoothukudi district commenced on 5 March 2025 with the groundbreaking ceremony for the realisation of three major facilities. The foundation stone for the complex was laid on 28 February 2024. Subsequently, the site development activities were carried out, and the site is now ready for the commencement of the construction of the Upper Stage Assembly Facilities (UAF-I & UAF-II) for the preparation of the second and third stages of the 3-staged SSLV vehicle along with a Launch Service Building (LSB).

The launch complex planned at Kulasekarapattinam is primarily to address the polar launches of the Small Satellite Launch Vehicle (SSLV) which is envisaged to capture the global launch service market for small satellites up to 500 kg. SSLV development has been completed and in the operational phase, the vehicle is envisaged for production by Indian industry.
