= Arumuganeri =

Arumuganeri Arumuganeri
- Town
- Location in Tamil Nadu, India
- Coordinates: 8.5681°N 78.0937°E
- Country: India
- State: Tamil Nadu
- District: Thoothukudi
- Elevation: 30 m (98 ft)

Population (2001)
  - Total: 24,801

Languages
  - Official: Tamil
- Time zone: UTC+5:30 (IST)

Arumuganeri is a panchayat town at Tiruchendur constituency from Thoothukudi district in the state of Tamil Nadu, India. In ancient times, the town was part of the Kuda Nadu division led by Korkai.

== Geography ==
Arumuganeri is located at 8.5681°N 78.0937°E. It has an average elevation of 30 metres (100 feet).

== Neriyoor ==
In common parlance, the locals and the surrounding people call Arumuganeri as 'Neriyoor' in short. The main advantage of this abbreviation is that the long name Arumuganeri is pronounced 'Neriyoor(tamil form: நேரியூர்)' easily and quickly by people by adding 'oor(that mean : town)' to its last two letters 'Neri'.

== Population ==
As of the 2001 census of India, the Arumuganeri Town Panchayat has a population of 27,266. In 2011, the census reported that 13,368 are males while 13,898 are females.

== Transport ==
The nearest port is V. O. Chidambaranar Port Trust Tuticorin Port.

=== By air ===
The nearest domestic airport is Tuticorin Airport which is around 30 km from Arumuganeri. The nearest International Airport is Madurai Airport which is 170 km from it.

=== By rail ===
The Arumuganeri railway station lies in the Tirunelveli-Tiruchendur line. Chendur Express is the only express train connecting Arumuganeri with Chennai. There are six passenger trains in which two between Tiruchendur and Tirunelveli, two between Tiruchendur and Thoothukudi and two between Tiruchendur and Palani.

=== By road ===
There are regular buses to nearby towns and cities. There are many government and private buses to many parts of the state.

== Gallery ==
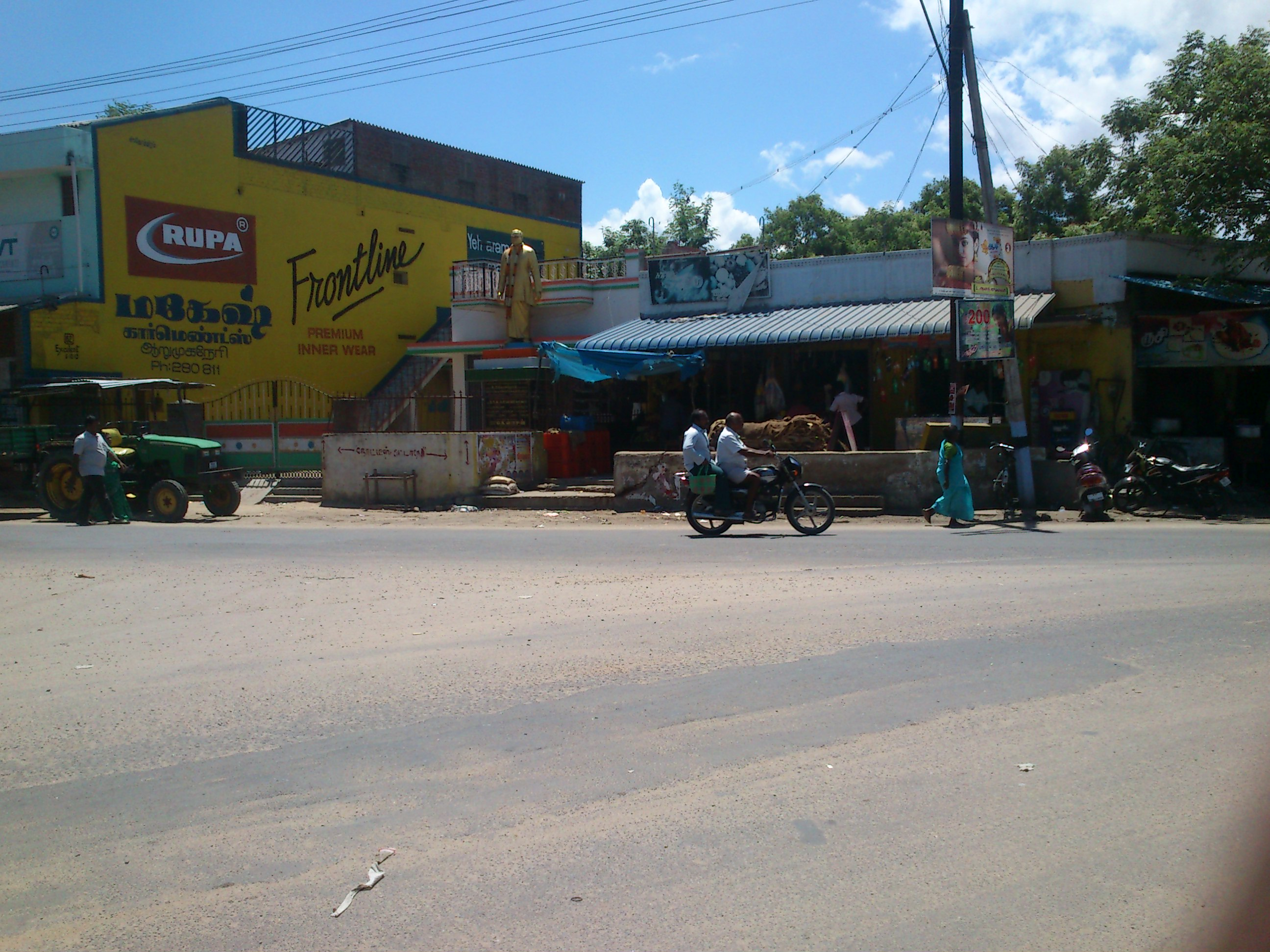
Main bazaar and bus stand

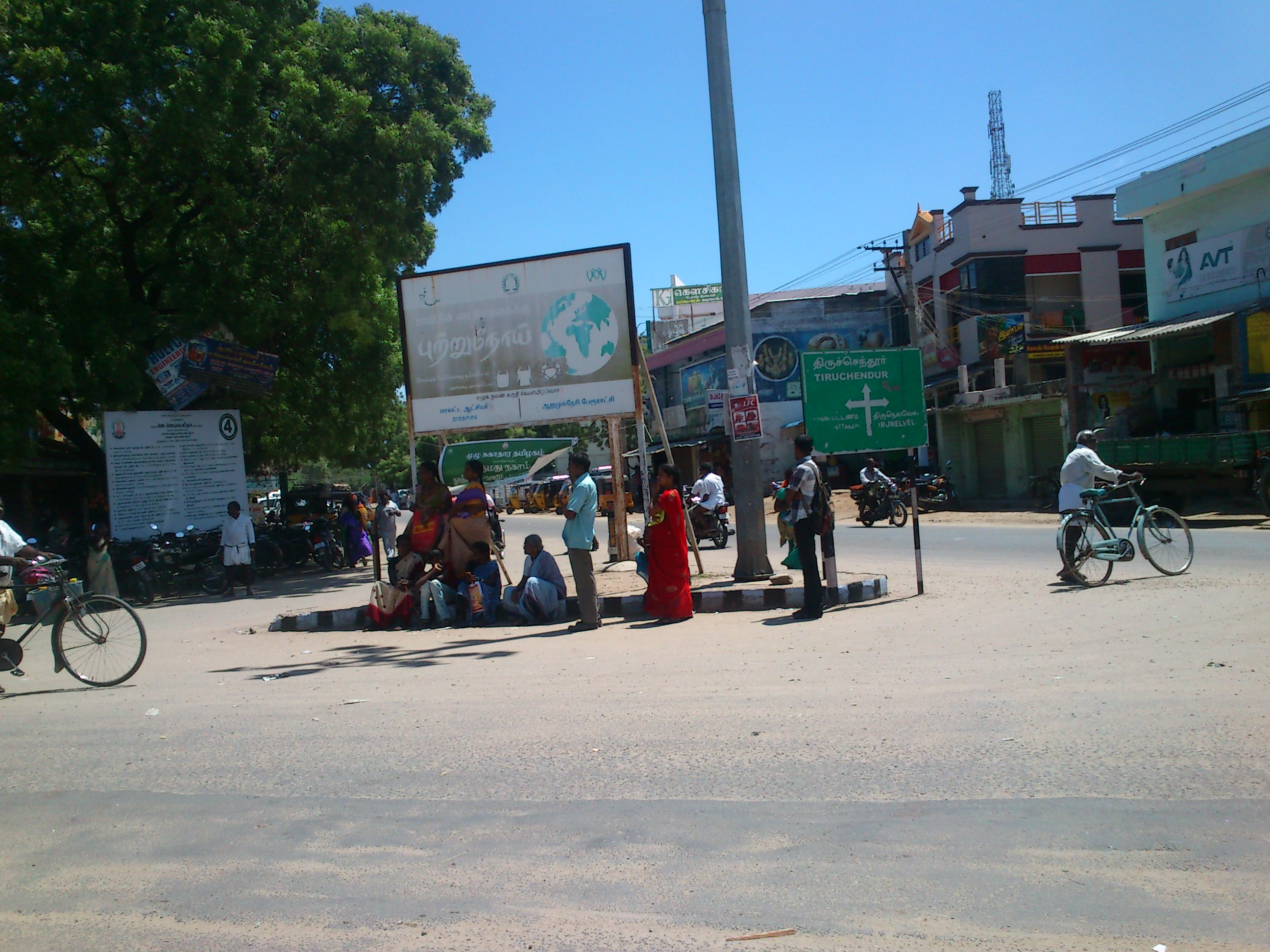
Main bazaar and bus stand

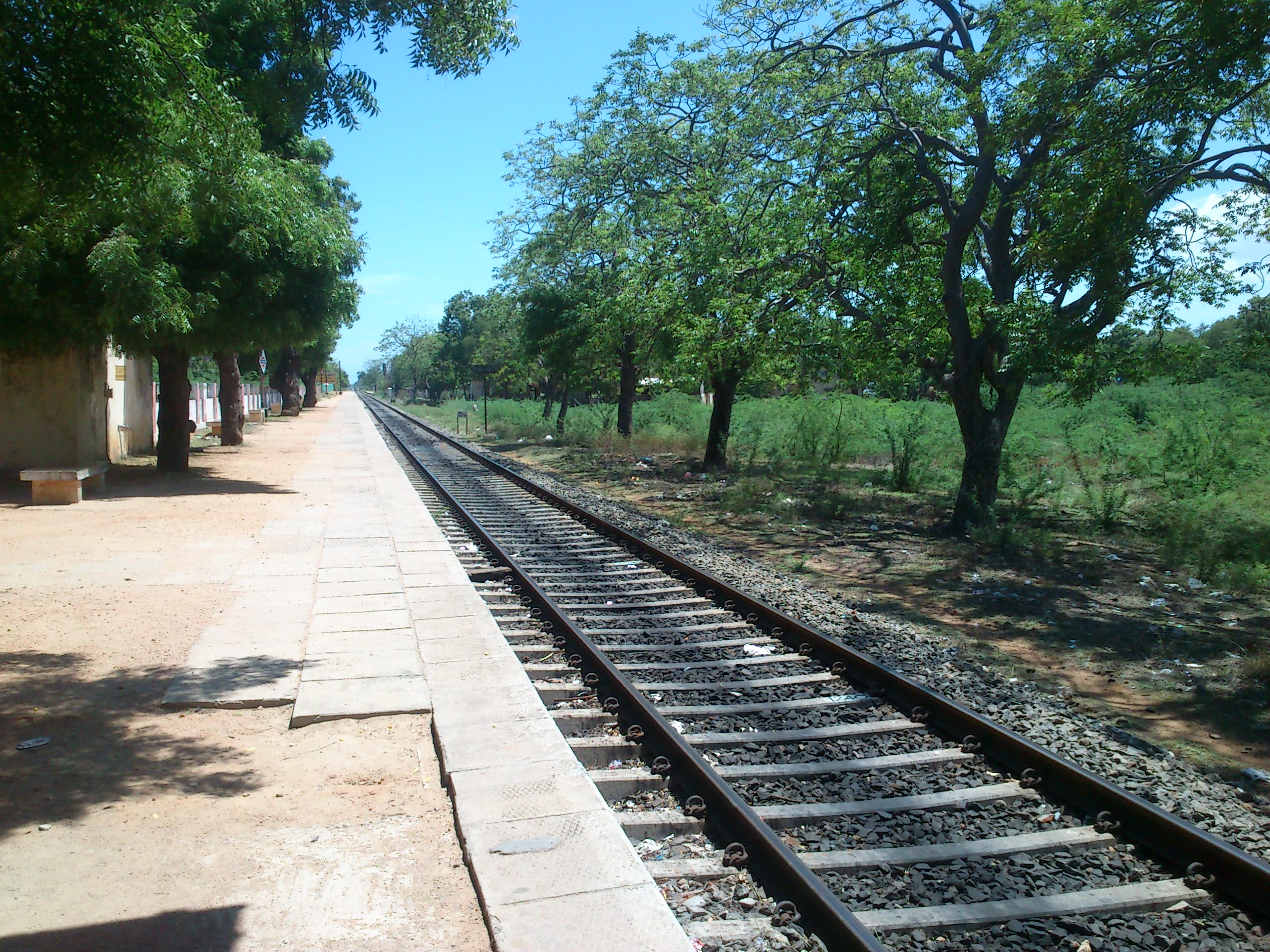
Railway track passing through the middle of Arumuganeri to the coast

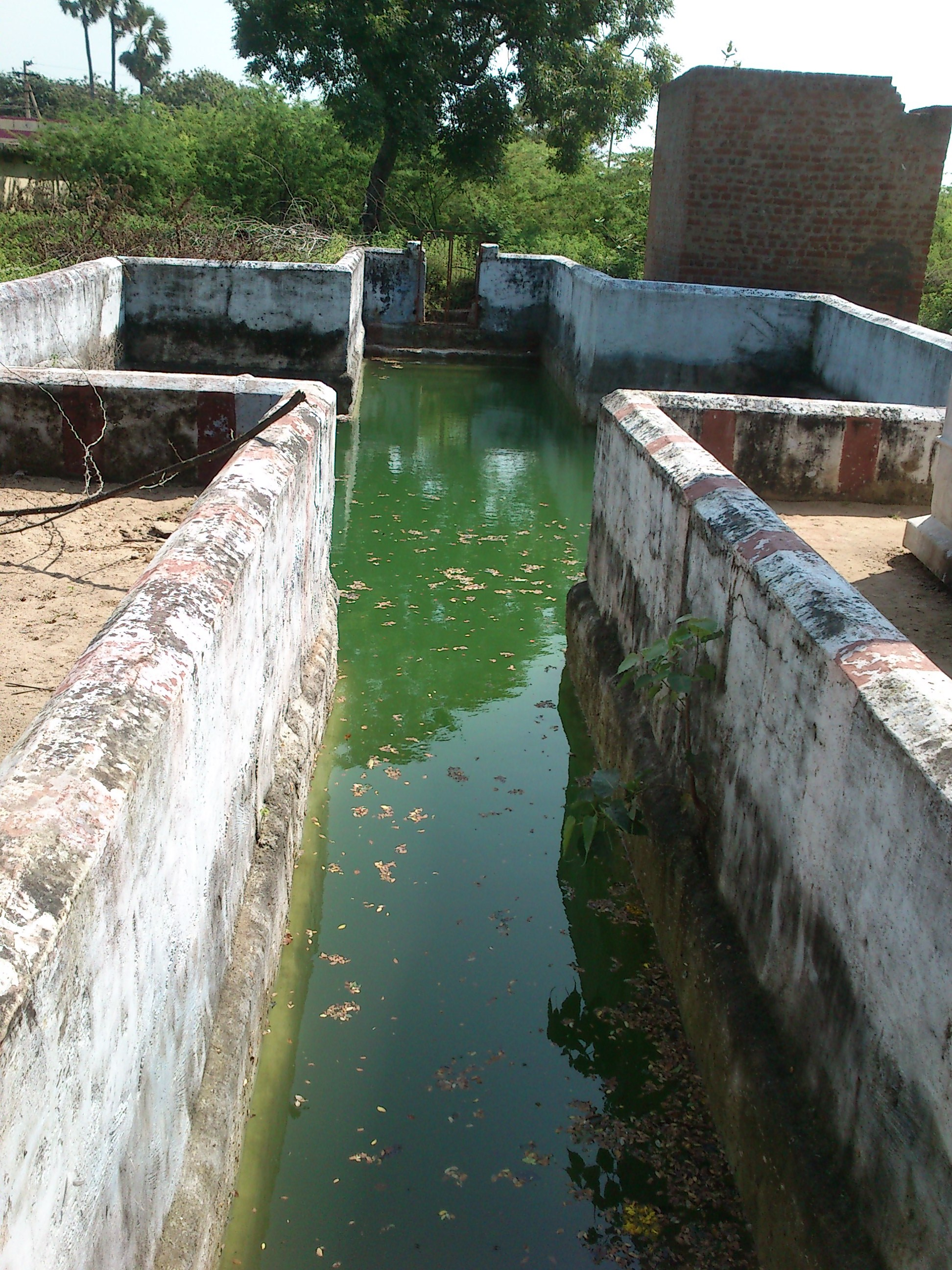
Well utilized for the benefit of the Surangapadai

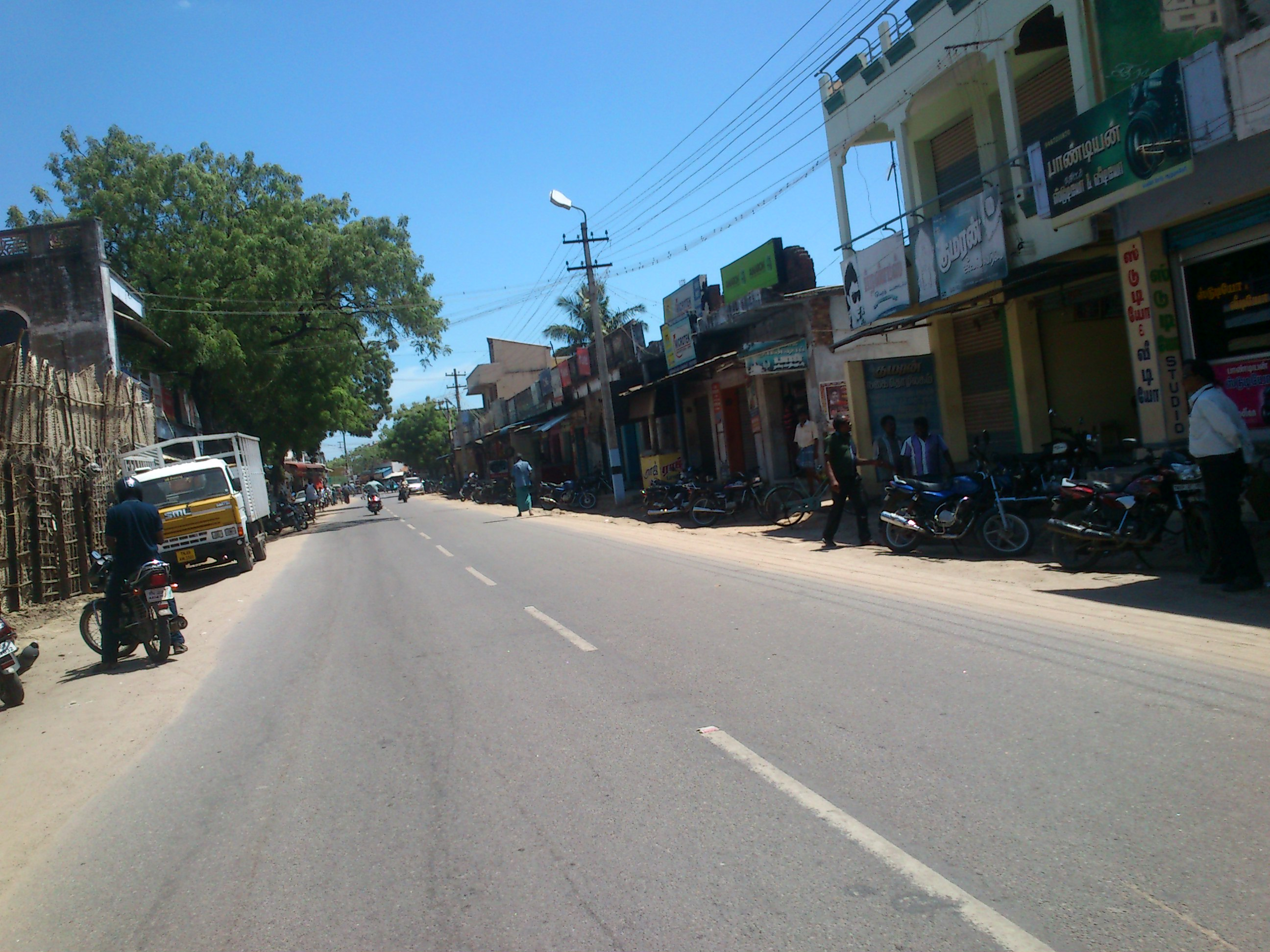
Main road
