= Sasikala =

Sasikala or Shashikala may refer to:

- V. K. Sasikala (born 1957), Indian businesswoman and politician
- Sasikala (actress) (born 1965), Indian film actress
- Sasikala Pushpa (born 1976), Indian politician

== See also ==
- Shashikala (1932–2021), Indian actress
