= Arumuganeri railway station =

Railway station in Tamil Nadu, India

Arumuganeri

General information
- Location: Railway Feeder Road, Arumuganeri, Thoothukudi district, Tamil Nadu
- Coordinates: 8.579354°N 78.092031°E
- Elevation: 7 metres (23 ft)
- System: Indian Railways Station
- Line: Tirunelveli–Tiruchendur branch line
- Platforms: 3
- Connections: Auto rickshaws, bus

Construction
- Structure type: Standard (on ground station)
- Parking: Available
- Accessible: Disabled access

Other information
- Status: Functioning
- Station code: ANY
- Zone(s): Southern Railway zone
- Division(s): Madurai

History
- Opened: 1942; 84 years ago
- Rebuilt: 2008; 18 years ago
Route map
Location
- Location within Tamil Nadu

Arumuganeri railway station (station code:ANY) is an NSG–6 category Indian railway station in Madurai railway division of Southern Railway zone. It is a station in Arumuganeri of Thoothukudi district in the Indian state of Tamil Nadu.

== History ==
The station lies on the Tiruchendur-Thoothukudi state highway. There are many salt fields in the surrounding areas . The main reason for building this station was for freight transport. The salt manufactured were processed in mills, then packed and finally transported. But now salt transportation through goods train has stopped.

== Services ==
Chendur Express is the only direct train from this station to Chennai. There are passenger trains to Tirunelveli, Thoothukudi, Palani & Tiruchendur from Arumuganeri.
