= Thoothukkudi City Municipal Corporation =

Governing body of Thoothukkudi, Tamil Nadu, India

Type
- Type: Municipal Corporation
- Term limits: 5 years

History
- Founded: 5 August 2008; 17 years ago

Leadership
- Mayor: P. Jegan, DMK since 4 March 2022
- Deputy Mayor: S. Jenitta, DMK since 4 March 2022
- Commissioner: S. Priyanka, I.A.S. since 1 September 2025

Structure
- Seats: 60
- Political groups: Government (52): DMK (46); INC (3); CPI (1); CPI(M) (1); IUML (1); Opposition (5): AIADMK (5); Others (3): IND (3)

Elections
- Voting system: First past the post
- Last election: 19 February 2022
- Next election: 2027

Motto
- வையகம் வாழ வாழ்வோம் (Tamil); Let's live life to the fullest

Meeting place
- Thoothukkudi City Municipal Corporation Office, 113, Tamizh Salai, Thoothukkudi – 628002.

Website
- www.thoothukudicorporation.com

The Thoothukkudi City Municipal Corporation (abbr. TCMC; Tamil: தூத்துக்குடி மாநகராட்சி, IAST: Tūttukkuṭi mānakarāṭci) is the governing civic body of Thoothukkudi, the sea gate of the southern Indian state of Tamil Nadu. It was established by the Government of Tamil Nadu under the Thoothukkudi City Municipal Corporation Act, 2008 (Tamil Nadu Act 27 of 2008). The corporation is responsible for the civic infrastructure and administration of the city and some suburbs. The corporation consists of a legislative and an executive body. The corporation consists of a legislative and an executive body, which is headed by the mayor and assisted by a deputy mayor, while the executive body is headed by a commissioner of the corporation. It consists of 60 wards within the city's limits.

The headquarters of the corporation is located near Perunthalaivar Kamarajar Market at Tamizh Salai, Thoothukkudi.

== History ==
Thoothukkudi City Municipal Corporation is one of the 21 municipal corporations in the state of Tamil Nadu. Thoothukkudi was constituted as a municipality as per the Town Improvement Act of 1865 on 1 November 1866. It upgraded the status of municipal corporation on 5 August 2008 after 142 years of being a municipality in view of rapid increase in population and extension of administrative boundaries.

The jurisdiction of Thoothukkudi City Municipal Corporation has been extended in May 2011, to include the areas of the city Corporation, 3 Municipalities, 17 Town Panchayats and 11 Village Panchayats located around the corporation. Consequent to this extension, the total area of the corporation has increased considerably from 13.47 km^{2}. to 90.66 km^{2}. and the numbers of the wards have increased from 51 to 60. The extended Municipal Corporation had a population of 3,72,408 as per 2011 census.

=== Linkages and connectivity ===
It is served by three main roads which radiate to Tiruchendur, Tirunelveli and Madurai. The town is also well connected by two National Highways: NH-138 to Tirunelveli, which it turn connects to NH-44 (Kanniyakumari to Srinagar) and NH-38 to Madurai, the temple-city of Tamil Nadu. The town is also linked with Gulf of Mannar bay.

The town is well connected by rail to other parts of the country with linkage to the V.O. Chidambaranar Port Authority. The total length of national highways covered in this corporation is 21 km (13 mi) and the length of state highways is about 31.73 km (19.72 mi).

=== Topography ===
The town is located at the longitude 78°13′E and latitude 8°45′N. The topography of the town is almost flat Terrain sloping from west to east direction towards the sea.

=== Climate ===
The maximum temperature during summer is 39 °C and during winter it is 32 °C. Monsoon in Thoothukkudi is normally characterized by heavy rains and thunderstorms.

== Structure ==
Zones of Thoothukkudi Municipal Corporation are

- Thoothukkudi North
- Thoothukkudi East
- Thoothukkudi West
- Thoothukkudi South

== Departments ==
Department	Sub-department
Administration	General
Administration	Accounts
Administration	Zone
Engineering	Engineering
Engineering	Head Works
Health	Health
Health	Sanitation
Health	Medical
Revenue	Revenue
Town Planning	Town Planning

== List of mayors ==
No.	Name	Ward number	Term in office			Appointed by	Political party
No.	Name	Ward number	Assumed office	Left office	Time in office	Appointed by	Political party
1	R. Kasthuri Thangam	Steady	5 August 2008	24 October 2011	3 years, 80 days	R. Lakshmi	Dravida Munnetra Kazhagam
2	Sasikala Pushpa	Steady	25 October 2011	23 January 2014	2 years, 90 days	Dinesh Ponraj Oliver	All India Anna Dravida Munnetra Kazhagam
3	A. P. R. Antony Grace	Steady	24 September 2014	24 October 2016	2 years, 30 days	S. Madumathi	All India Anna Dravida Munnetra Kazhagam
4	P. Jegan	20	4 March 2022	Incumbent	4 years, 117 days	T. Charusree	Dravida Munnetra Kazhagam

== List of deputy mayors ==
No.	Name	Ward number	Term in office			Appointed by	Political party	Mayor
No.	Name	Ward number	Assumed office	Left office	Time in office	Appointed by	Political party	Mayor
1	S. Thommai Yesuadiyan	Steady	9 August 2008	24 October 2011	3 years, 76 days	R. Lakshmi	Dravida Munnetra Kazhagam	R. Kasthuri Thangam
2	P. Xavier	Steady	29 October 2011	24 October 2016	4 years, 361 days	Dinesh Ponraj Oliver	All India Anna Dravida Munnetra Kazhagam	Sasikala Pushpa A. P. R. Antony Grace
3	S. Jenitta	46	4 March 2022	Incumbent	4 years, 117 days	T. Charusree	Dravida Munnetra Kazhagam	P. Jegan

== List of commissioners ==
No.	Name	Term in office		
No.	Name	Assumed office	Left office	Time in office
1	R. Lakshmi	5 August 2008	1 September 2009	1 year, 27 days
2	S. Kubendran	2 September 2009	3 January 2011	1 year, 123 days
–	S. A. Rajagopalan	4 January 2011	10 January 2011	6 days
3	M. Seeni Ajmal Khan	10 January 2011	21 January 2011	11 days
4	Dinesh Ponraj Oliver	21 January 2011	6 March 2012	1 year, 45 days
5	S. Madumathi	7 March 2012	7 April 2014	2 years, 31 days
–	S. A. Rajagopalan	7 April 2014	10 April 2014	3 days
6	V. K. Shunmugam	10 April 2014	22 May 2014	42 days
–	S. A. Rajagopalan	22 May 2014	30 May 2014	8 days
(5)	S. Madumathi	30 May 2014	30 June 2015	1 year, 31 days
–	S. A. Rajagopalan	30 June 2015	6 July 2015	6 days
–	S. M. Rakkappan	6 July 2015	8 August 2015	33 days
7	R. Poongodi Arumaikkan	8 August 2015	23 September 2016	1 year, 46 days
8	K. Rajamani	23 September 2016	30 May 2017	249 days
–	A. Lakshman	30 May 2017	5 June 2017	6 days
9	Alby John Varghese	5 June 2017	20 February 2019	1 year, 260 days
–	P. Ruban Suresh Ponniah	21 February 2019	24 February 2019	3 days
10	V. P. Jeyaseelan	25 February 2019	8 February 2021	1 year, 349 days
11	Sharanya Ari	8 February 2021	16 June 2021	128 days
12	T. Charusree	19 June 2021	3 February 2023	1 year, 229 days
13	C. Dinesh Kumar	5 February 2023	12 February 2024	1 year, 7 days
14	L. Madhubalan	15 February 2024	25 June 2025	1 year, 130 days
–	K. Saravana Kumar	26 June 2025	29 June 2025	3 days
15	Banoth Mrugender Lal	30 June 2025	31 August 2025	62 days
16	S. Priyanka	1 September 2025	Incumbent	301 days

== List of councillors ==
DMK (46) AIADMK (5) IND (3) INC (3) CPI (1) CPI(M) (1) IUML (1)
Ward No.	Elected member	Political party	Alliance	Remarks			
1	Elected member	Political party	Alliance	Remarks	P. Gandhimani	Dravida Munnetra Kazhagam	INDIA
2	P. Subbulakshmi	Dravida Munnetra Kazhagam	INDIA				
3	R. Rengasamy	Dravida Munnetra Kazhagam	INDIA				
4	B. Nageswari	Dravida Munnetra Kazhagam	INDIA				
5	A. Antony Prakash Marsalin	Dravida Munnetra Kazhagam	INDIA				
6	K. Jeyaseeli	Dravida Munnetra Kazhagam	INDIA				
7	T. Nirmal Raj	Dravida Munnetra Kazhagam	INDIA	Chairman of North Zone			
8	M. Bhavani	Dravida Munnetra Kazhagam	INDIA				
9	M. Sebastin Sudha	Dravida Munnetra Kazhagam	INDIA				
10	S. Padmavathy	All India Anna Dravida Munnetra Kazhagam	NDA				
11	S. Karpagakani	Indian National Congress	INDIA				
12	S. Deivendran	Dravida Munnetra Kazhagam	INDIA				
13	S. Jackuline Jeya	Dravida Munnetra Kazhagam	INDIA				
14	M. Murugesan	Dravida Munnetra Kazhagam	INDIA				
15	V. Esakkiraja	Dravida Munnetra Kazhagam	INDIA				
16	P. Kannan	Dravida Munnetra Kazhagam	INDIA				
17	T. Ramar	Dravida Munnetra Kazhagam	INDIA				
18	T. Srinivasan	Dravida Munnetra Kazhagam	INDIA				
19	S. Somasundari	Dravida Munnetra Kazhagam	INDIA				
20	P. Jegan	Dravida Munnetra Kazhagam	INDIA	Mayor			
21	M. Jansirani	Dravida Munnetra Kazhagam	INDIA				
22	T. Mageswari	Dravida Munnetra Kazhagam	INDIA				
23	G. Dhanalakshmi	Communist Party of India	INDIA				
24	D. Metlida	Dravida Munnetra Kazhagam	INDIA				
25	P. Edlinda	Indian National Congress	INDIA				
26	E. Maria Geetha	Dravida Munnetra Kazhagam	INDIA				
27	S. Saranya	Dravida Munnetra Kazhagam	INDIA				
28	A. Ramu Ammal	Dravida Munnetra Kazhagam	INDIA				
29	T. Kalaiselvi	Dravida Munnetra Kazhagam	INDIA	Chairman of East Zone			
30	R. Athistamani	Dravida Munnetra Kazhagam	INDIA				
31	S. P. Kanagaraj	Dravida Munnetra Kazhagam	INDIA				
32	A. Kandhasamy	Dravida Munnetra Kazhagam	INDIA				
33	M. Ponnappan	Dravida Munnetra Kazhagam	INDIA				
34	S. Chandrabose	Indian National Congress	INDIA				
35	R. Veerapagu	All India Anna Dravida Munnetra Kazhagam	NDA				
36	R. Vijayalakshmi	Dravida Munnetra Kazhagam	INDIA				
37	A. Papathi	Independent	Steady				
38	Mumtaj	Indian Union Muslim League	INDIA				
39	S. Sureshkumar	Dravida Munnetra Kazhagam	INDIA				
40	J. Ricta	Dravida Munnetra Kazhagam	INDIA				
41	P. Baby Angelin	Dravida Munnetra Kazhagam	INDIA				
42	K. Annalakshmi	Dravida Munnetra Kazhagam	INDIA	Chairman of West Zone			
43	R. Muthumari	Communist Party of India (Marxist)	INDIA				
44	J. Jeyarani	Independent	Steady				
45	P. Ramakrishnan	Dravida Munnetra Kazhagam	INDIA				
46	S. Jenitta	Dravida Munnetra Kazhagam	INDIA	Deputy Mayor			
47	S. Rexline	Dravida Munnetra Kazhagam	INDIA				
48	S. Rajendran	Dravida Munnetra Kazhagam	INDIA				
49	P. Vaithegi	Dravida Munnetra Kazhagam	INDIA				
50	S. Saravanakumar	Dravida Munnetra Kazhagam	INDIA				
51	S. Manthiramoorthy	All India Anna Dravida Munnetra Kazhagam	NDA				
52	G. Vetriselvan	All India Anna Dravida Munnetra Kazhagam	NDA				
53	S. Muthuvel	Dravida Munnetra Kazhagam	INDIA				
54	S. Vijayakumar	Dravida Munnetra Kazhagam	INDIA				
55	M. Rajadurai	Dravida Munnetra Kazhagam	INDIA				
56	C. Suyambu	Dravida Munnetra Kazhagam	INDIA				
57	S. Jeyalakshmi	All India Anna Dravida Munnetra Kazhagam	NDA				
58	D. Patchiraj	Dravida Munnetra Kazhagam	INDIA				
59	S. P. S. Raja	Independent	Steady				
60	A. Balaguruswamy	Dravida Munnetra Kazhagam	INDIA	Chairman of South Zone			

== Thoothukudi Corporation Thooimai Thinam ==
- http://www.thoothukudicorporation.com/thoothukudi-corporation-thooimai-thinam.html
- http://www.thoothukudicorporation.com/thooimai-thoothukudi.html
