= Chennai Egmore–Tuticorin Link Express =

Overview
- Service type: Express
- Locale: Inside Tamilnadu
- First service: 31 July 2013; 13 years ago
- Last service: 2020 April 1
- Current operator: Southern Railway zone

Route
- Termini: Chennai Egmore (MS); Tuticorin (TN)
- Stops: 24
- Distance travelled: 652 km (405 mi)
- Average journey time: 12h 15m
- Service frequency: Daily (Note: Runs seven days in a week for every direction.)
- Train number: 16129/16130
- Line used: Chord Line

On-board services
- Classes: Second Sitting, General Unreserved
- Seating arrangements: Yes
- Sleeping arrangements: No
- Auto-rack arrangements: No
- Catering facilities: On-board catering, E-catering
- Observation facilities: ICF coach, large windows
- Entertainment facilities: No
- Baggage facilities: No
- Other facilities: Below the seats, Enlarged windows, on-board charger sockets.

Technical
- Rolling stock: 2
- Track gauge: 1,676 mm (5 ft 6 in)
- Electrification: Yes
- Operating speed: 53 km/h (33 mph), including halts

The Chennai Egmore–Tuticorin Link Express is an Express train belonging to Southern Railway zone that was running between Chennai Egmore and Tuticorin in India. The train is not being operated and is now permanently cancelled. It is also called Koodal Express or Kudal Express.

== Service ==
The 16129/Chennai Egmore–Tuticorin Link Express has an average speed of 53 km/h and covers 652 km in 12h 15m. The 16130/Tuticorin–Chennai Egmore Link Express has an average speed of 51 km/h and covers 652 km in 12h 45m.

== Route and halts ==
The important halts of the train are:

- Chennai Egmore
- Tambaram
- Viluppuram Junction
- Tiruchchirappalli Junction
- Dindigul Junction
- Madurai Junction
- Virudunagar Junction
- Vanchi Maniyachchi Junction
- Tuticorin

== Coach composition ==
The train had standard ICF rakes with a maximum speed of 110 km/h. The train consists of 6 coaches:

- 4 second sitting
- 1 general unreserved
- 2 seating cum luggage rake

== Traction ==
Both trains are hauled by an Erode Loco Shed-based WAP-4 electric locomotive from Chennai to Tuticorin and vice versa.

== Rake sharing ==
The trains were attached/detached from/to Guruvayur Express at Vanchi Maniyachchi. From Chennai Egmore to Vanchi Maniyachi and vice versa the train had run coupled with Guruvayur Express. A separate loco will haul the train from Vanchi Maniyachi to Tuticorin and vice versa.

== See also ==
- Chennai Egmore railway station
- Tuticorin railway station
- Coimbatore–Tuticorin Link Express
