= Palaruvi Express =

Train in India

Overview
- Service type: Express
- Locale: Kerala & Tamil Nadu
- First service: 20 April 2017; 9 years ago (initial service between Palakkad Jn and Punalur); 9 July 2018; 8 years ago (extended to Tirunelveli Junction); 15 August 2024; 2 years ago (extended to Tuticorin).
- Current operator: Southern Railway

Route
- Termini: Tuticorin (TN); Palakkad Junction (PGT)
- Stops: 40
- Distance travelled: 537 km (334 mi)
- Average journey time: 14 hrs
- Service frequency: Daily
- Train number: 16791 / 16792

On-board services
- Classes: Sleeper Class, General Unreserved, 3AC Class
- Seating arrangements: Yes
- Sleeping arrangements: Yes
- Catering facilities: No
- Observation facilities: Large windows
- Baggage facilities: No
- Other facilities: Below the seats

Technical
- Rolling stock: LHB coach
- Track gauge: 5 ft 6 in (1,676 mm); Broad Gauge
- Operating speed: 35 km/h (22 mph) average including halts.
- Rake maintenance: Tuticorin CDO

The 16791 / 16792 Palaruvi Express is an Intercity express train which runs between Tuticorin in Tamil Nadu and Palakkad Junction in Kerala. The train first introduced between Punalur in Kollam and Palakkad. On 9 July 2018, it was extended up to Tirunelveli Junction and later on 15 August 2024 it was extended till Tuticorin. It is named after the Palaruvi Falls.

== Background ==
The train was introduced on 19 April 2017, providing better connectivity to the Eastern Kollam region with Central Kerala and as a relief for daily commuters, especially office-goers who have been relying on Venad Express.

On 29 May 2022 it became the first train to pass through the doubled track between Ettumanoor-Kottayam-Chingavanam section which made the Thiruvananthapuram-Kottayam-Ernakulam-Mangaluru section completely doubled electrified line.

On 2024 July 28, the Palaruvi Express from Tirunelveli to Palakkad was the first electric train that passed through the recently electrified Sengottai - Kollam railway line.

== Route ==
The service runs from Tuticorin(16791) every night and reaches Palakkad Junction the following afternoon. Prominent stoppages include Tirunelveli Junction, Tenkasi Junction, Punalur,Kundara, Kollam Junction , (Note: The service reverses its rakes to continue the journey.) Kayamkulam Junction, Tiruvalla, Kottayam, Ernakulam Town and Thrissur. On the return journey, the train leaves every evening, traverses the same route and reaches Tuticorin, next morning.

The train reverses its direction at Kollam.

== Coach composition ==
The train has eighteen coaches comprising five sleeper coaches, eleven unreserved general coaches and two luggage rakes. (Note: The coach composition is subject to change.)

Loco	1	2	3	4	5	6	7	8	9	10	11	12	13	14	15	16	17	18
	SLR	GEN	GEN	GEN	GEN	GEN	S1	S2		S4	S5	GEN	GEN	GEN	GEN	GEN	GEN	SLR

Since its introduction in April 2017, the train was running without even a single reservation compartment till September 2019. The train started 4 reservation sleeper compartments.

== Gallery ==
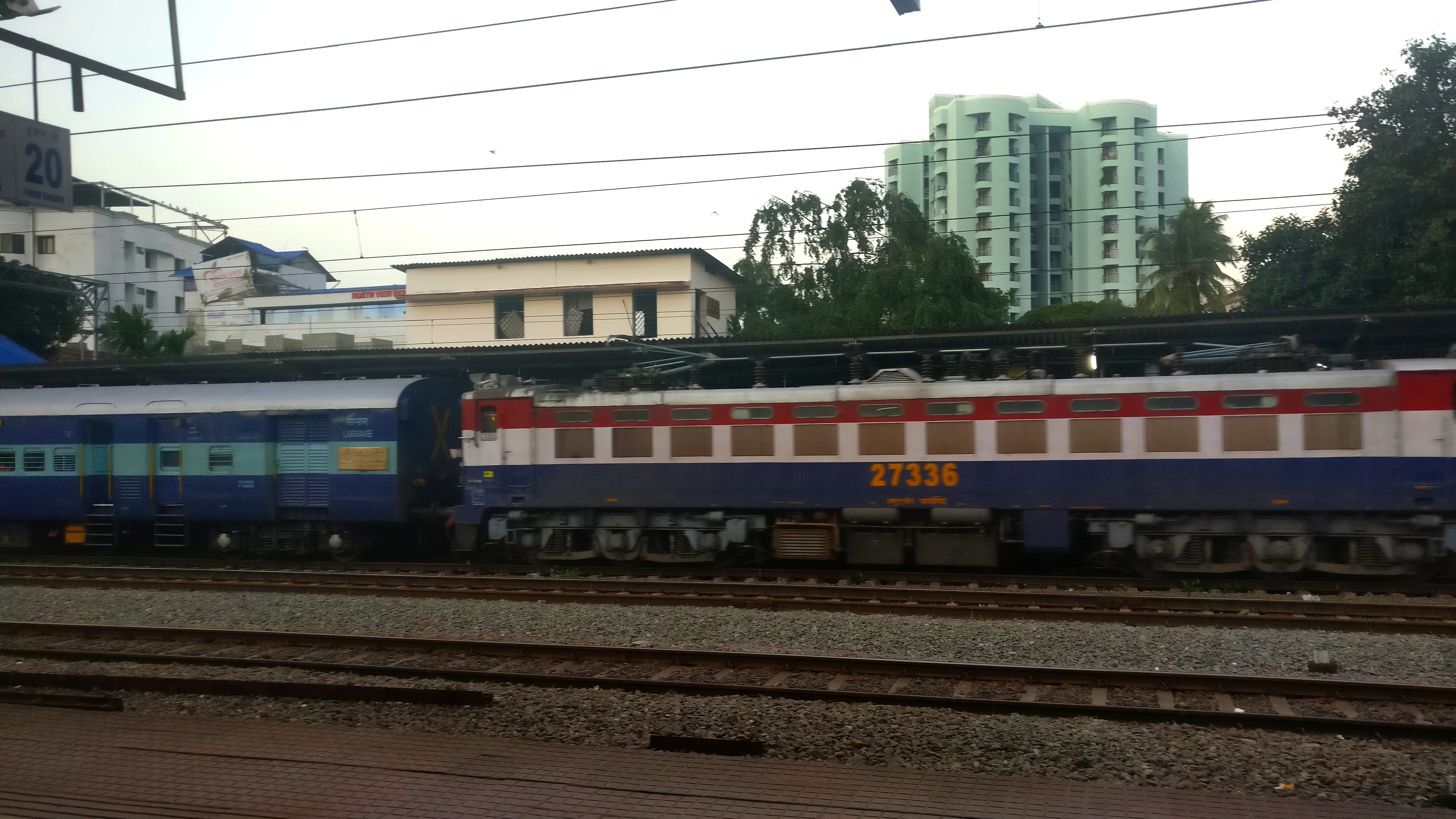
Palaruvii Express at Ernakulam Town

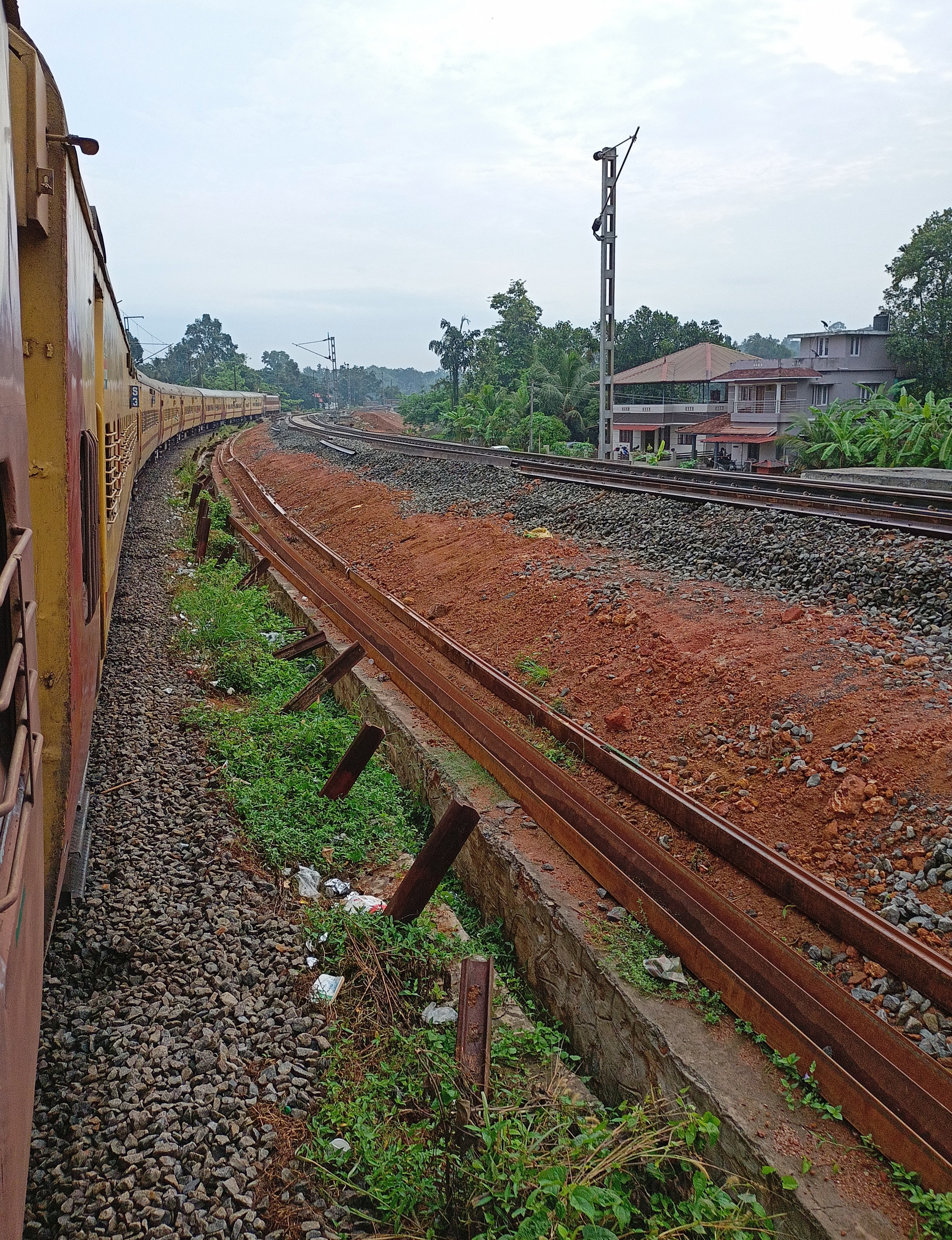
Palaruvi Express at Kottayam

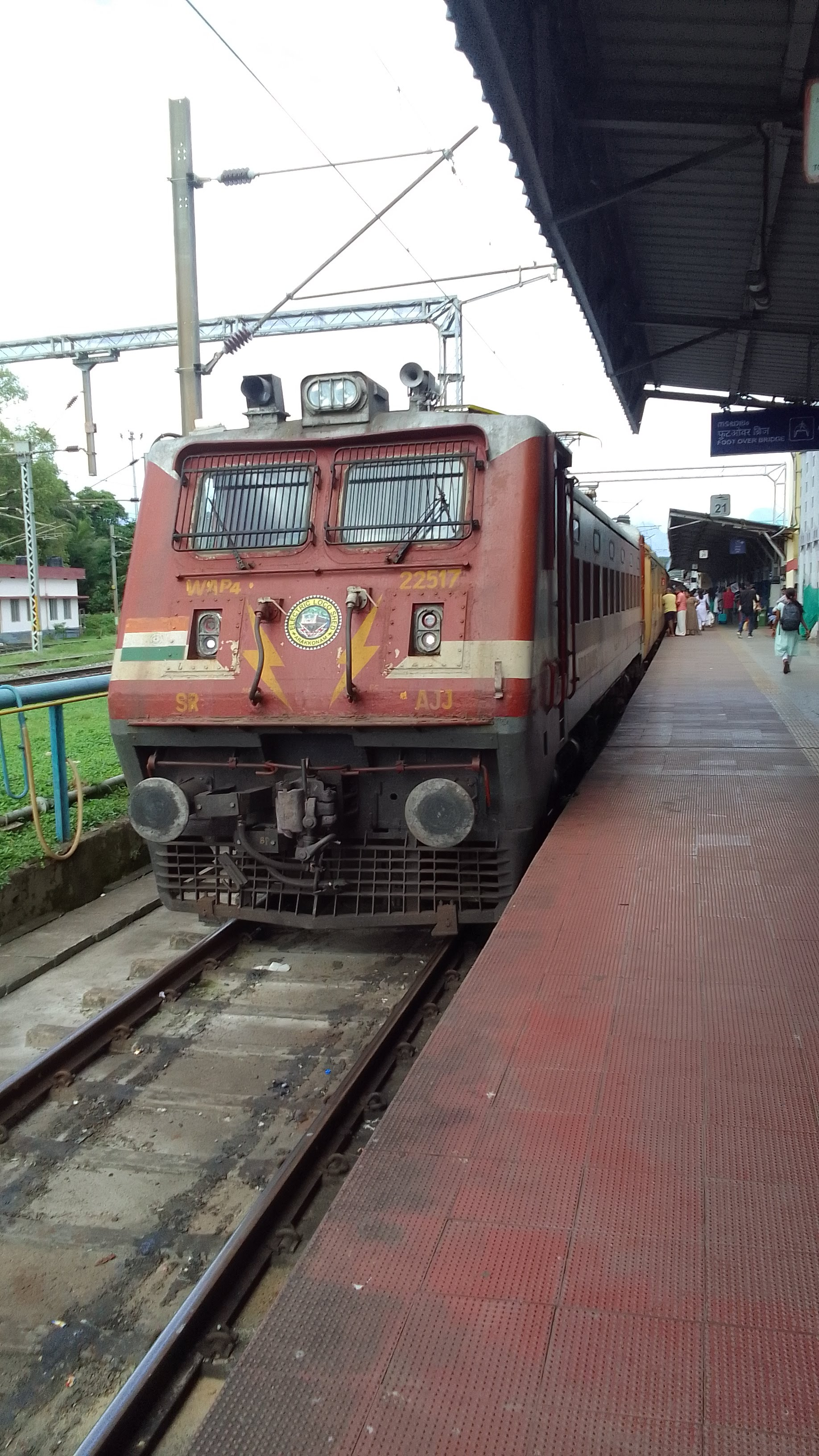
WAP-4 pulling the Palaruvi Express

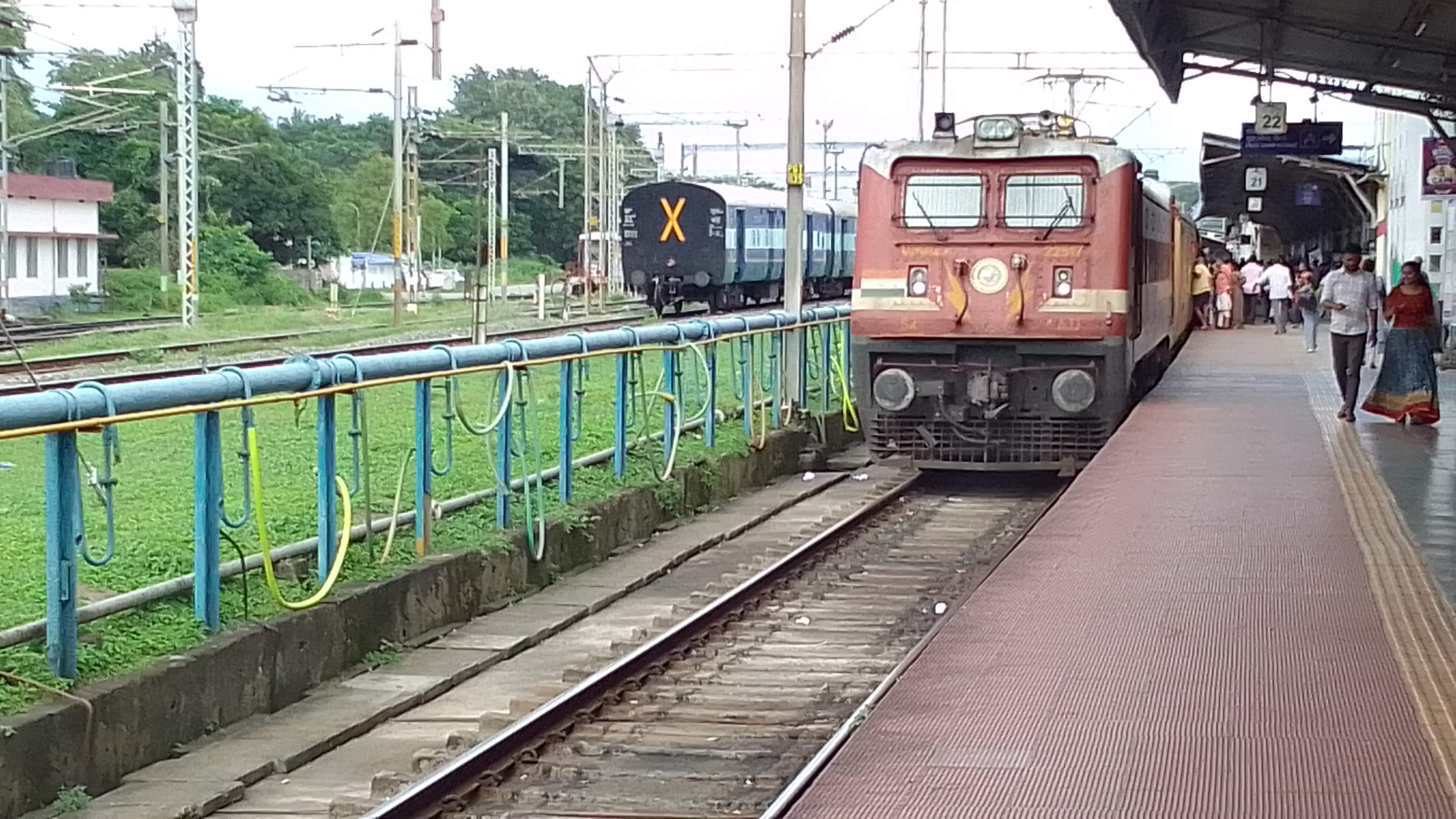
Train at Palakkad Junction

== See also ==
- Venad Express
- Ernakulam–Velankanni Express
- Pearl City Express
- Kollam–Thiruvananthapuram trunk line
- Kollam–Sengottai branch line
- Shoranur–Cochin Harbour section
- Jolarpettai- Shornur line
