= Coimbatore–Tuticorin Link Express =

Daily express train run by Indian Railways

Coimbatore–Thoothukudi Link Express
Overview
- Service type: superfast express
- Locale: Tamil Nadu
- First service: 11 June 2011; 15 years ago
- Last service: 1 January 2019
- Current operator: Southern Railways

Route
- Termini: Coimbatore city Junction; Thoothukudi
- Stops: 14
- Distance travelled: 466 km (290 mi)
- Average journey time: 8 hours 25 minutes
- Service frequency: daily
- Train number: 22669/22670

On-board services
- Classes: Sleeper, A/C Sleeper
- Seating arrangements: Yes
- Sleeping arrangements: Yes
- Auto-rack arrangements: No
- Catering facilities: No
- Observation facilities: No
- Entertainment facilities: No
- Baggage facilities: Yes

Technical
- Rolling stock: ICF Coach & WAP 4/WDP 4B
- Track gauge: 1,676 mm (5 ft 6 in)
- Electrification: Yes
- Operating speed: 47 km/h (29 mph) average with halts

Coimbatore–Tuticorin Link Express (Train Nos 22669/22670) is a daily express train run by Indian Railways between Coimbatore city Junction and Thoothukudi in Tamil Nadu. The train made its inaugural run on 11 June 2011. Now, i.e. from 28.06.2017, it was upgraded as superfast express train.

== Service and schedule ==
The train runs daily covering the total distance of 461 kilometres (286 mi) in approximately 9 hours.

Train number	Station code	Departure station	Departure time	Departure day	Arrival station	Arrival time	Arrival day
22669	TN	Tuticorin	10:35 PM	Daily	Coimbatore	7:20 AM	Daily (next day)
22670	CBE	Coimbatore	7:20 PM	Daily	Tuticorin	3:55 AM	Daily (next day)

== Route and stations ==
This train passes through 14 intermediate stations including Tiruppur, Erode, Karur, Dindigul, Madurai, Virudhunagar, Kovilpatti, and Vanchi Maniyachchi.

== Coach and rake ==
The Coimbatore–Tuticorin express has no rake sharing arrangement. The train is pulled by Erode WAP-4 or Golden Rock WDP-4.
