= National Highway 138 (India) =

National highway in India

National Highway 138
- Thoothukudi - Tirunelveli Highway
- Map of National Highway 138 in red

Route information
- Auxiliary route of NH 38
- Maintained by NHAI
- Length: 54 km (34 mi)

Major junctions
- East end: NH 32 / NH 38 in Tuticorin
- West end: NH 44 in Tirunelveli

Location
- Country: India
- States: Tamil Nadu

Highway system
- Roads in India; Expressways; National; State; Asian
← NH 38	→ NH 338

National Highway 138 is a national highway of India.

== Route ==
This highway connects Palayamkottai in Tirunelveli city to V.O. Chidambaranar Port Authority in Thoothukudi city. This route provides quick transportation of goods from Tirunelveli to V.O. Chidambaranar Port Authority in Thoothukudi. It provides a direct route to the port and is 54 km in length.

Tuticorin Airport in also situated on this highway near Vagaikulam. The airport is situated 26 km from Thoothukudi city and 28 km from Tirunelveli city.
