= Sasikala Pushpa =

Indian politician (born 1976)

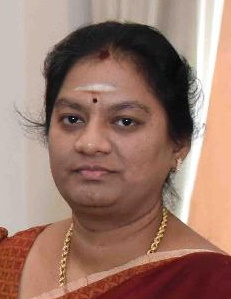

Member of Parliament, Rajya Sabha
- In office 3 April 2014 – 2 April 2020
- Prime Minister: Manmohan Singh; Narendra Modi
- Constituency: Tamil Nadu

Vice President of the Bharatiya Janata Party – Tamil Nadu
- Incumbent
- Assumed office 6 May 2022
- President: K. Annamalai; Nainar Nagenthiran

State Secretary of the AIADMK Women's Wing
- In office 28 May 2013 – 6 January 2016
- General Secretary: J. Jayalalithaa
- Preceded by: S. Gokula Indira
- Succeeded by: S. Gokula Indira

Mayor of Thoothukudi Municipal Corporation
- In office 25 October 2011 – 23 January 2014
- Preceded by: R. Kasthuri Thangam
- Succeeded by: A. P. R. Antony Grace

Personal details
- Born: Sasikala Pushpa Sathankulam, Tamil Nadu, India
- Party: Bharatiya Janata Party (2020–present)
- Other political affiliations: All India Anna Dravida Munnetra Kazhagam (until 2016); Independent (2016–2020)
- Spouse(s): Lingeswaran Thilagan (till 2018); B Ramaswamy (2019-2022)
- Profession: Politician

Sasikala Pushpa is an Indian politician who is the vice president of the Bharatiya Janata Party in Tamil Nadu. She was a member of the Parliament in the Rajya Sabha. She was also a mayor of Thoothukudi Municipal Corporation from 2011 to 2014.

== Political career ==
In August 2016, it was alleged that she had been expelled from the All India Anna Dravida Munnetra Kazhagam (AIADMK) party after an altercation with Dravida Munnetra Kazhagam (DMK) MP Tiruchi Siva at Delhi IGI airport. In July 2017 the Supreme Court found that no expulsion notice had been served and that she had not, in fact been expelled by the party.

In December 2016, AIADMK cadres thrashed expelled AIADMK MP Sasikala Pushpa's husband Lingeswaran Thilagan and their legal representatives when they arrived at the Royapettah AIADMK office to file nomination for the post of General Secretary. Pushpa's husband Lingeswara Thilagan was later arrested.

Sasikala Pushpa Ramaswamy joined BJP on February 2, 2020. She Was Appointed as Vice President of Tamil Nadu BJP.

== Personal life ==
A maid of Sasikala Pushpa on 9 August 2016, alleged that Pushpa, her husband Lingesvara Thilakan, and her son sexually harassed and tortured the maid and her sister. The maid alleged that they threatened to kill her if she told anybody about the abuse. When she tried to escape from their house in Anna Nagar, Pushpa's mother allegedly caught her and shaved her head. The Pudukkottai All Women Police Station registered a case against Sasikala Pushpa and her family based on the complaint. Pushpa and her family filed a joint petition before the Madurai bench of the Madras high court seeking anticipatory bail and claimed it was an act of political vendetta. The maids withdrew their complaint in March 2017.

In March 2018, Sasikala Pushpa married B Ramaswamy in violation of the order of the Madurai Family Court to stay the marriage. The stay was due to a complaint by Ramasamy's previous wife who had not yet officially divorced him.

Ramaswamy filed a complaint against Pushpa in January 2022, alleging that she used their house in Anna Nagar for prostitution. He also alleged that Pushpa tried to attack him and threatened to murder him. JJ Nagar police registered a case against Sasikala Pushpa and two others in February 2022, based on the complaint.
