= Thoothukudi Airport =

Domestic airport in Thoothukudi, India

Thoothukudi Airport Thoothukudi Vaanoorthi Nilaiyam
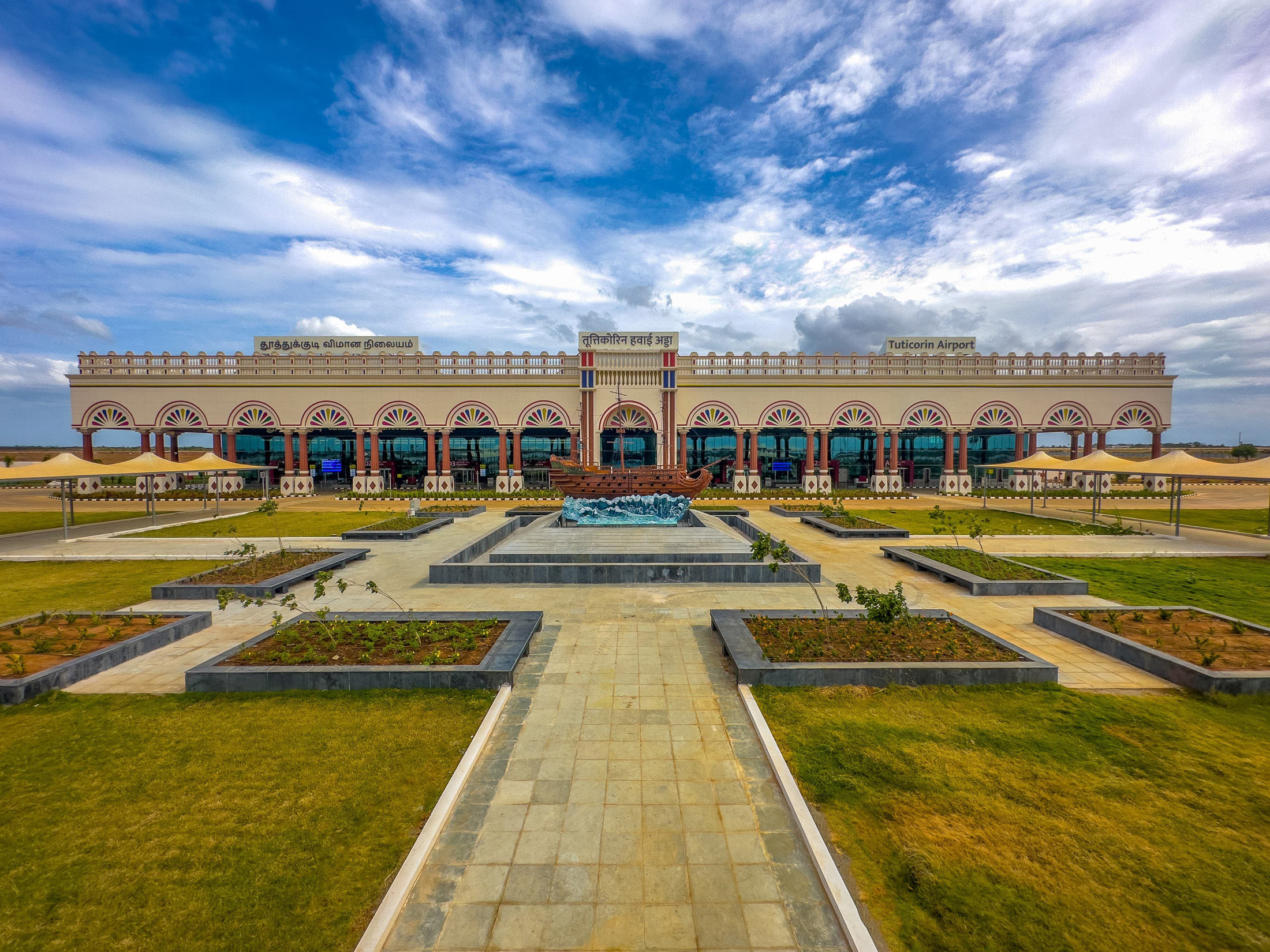
- Facade of the airport
- IATA: TCR; ICAO: VOTK

Summary
- Airport type: Public
- Owner: Ministry of Civil Aviation
- Operator: Airports Authority of India
- Serves: Thoothukudi
- Location: Vagaikulam, Thoothukkudi district, Tamil Nadu, India
- Opened: 30 April 1992; 34 years ago
- Time zone: Indian Standard Time (+5:30)
- Elevation AMSL: 39 m (128 ft)
- Coordinates: 08°43′27″N 078°01′33″E
- Website: Thoothukudi Airport

Map
- Location of airport in Tamil Nadu TCR (India)

Runways
| Direction | Length | | Surface |
| Direction | m | ft | Surface |
|---|---|---|---|
| 10/28 | 3,350 | 10,990 | Asphalt |

Statistics (April 2025 - March 2026)
- Passengers: 2,90,398 (▲26.2%)
- Aircraft movements: 4,366 (▲18.8%)
- Cargo tonnage: 16.6 (▲27%)
- Source: AAI

Thoothukudi Airport (IATA: TCR, ICAO: VOTK), formerly known as Tuticorin Airport, is a domestic airport serving the city of Thoothukudi and its adjoining districts of Thoothukudi, Tirunelveli, Tenkasi and Kanniyakumari in Tamil Nadu, India. It is located along the National Highway 7A at Vagaikulam, about 15.6 km (9.7 mi) west of the city centre. The airport was ISO 9001:2015 quality certified on 13 April 2018.

== History ==
Thoothukudi Airport was inaugurated in 1992, with the first aircraft, belonging to the regional carrier Vayudoot, landing on 13 April. This service was short-lived and operated only for 14 months. Three years later, NEPC Airlines operated a regular service from Chennai to Thoothukudi via Kochi for about six months. A decade later, Air Deccan began flights to the airport on 1 April 2006.

== Facilities ==
The airport had a 1,350 m (4,430 ft) long, and 30 m (98 ft) wide asphalt runway, which was extended to 3,115 m (10,220 ft) length and expanded to 45 m (148 ft) width in 2025. It is equipped with a Cat-I Instrument Landing System. There is a 1,573 m (5,161 ft) long and 23 m (75 ft) wide parallel taxiway, and a 149 m (489 ft) long taxi way linking the main taxiway to the runway. The main apron measuring 191 m × 89 m (627 ft × 292 ft), is capable of accommodating five narrow body aircraft. A separate parking bay measuring 76 m × 91 m (249 ft × 299 ft) can accommodate an additional aircraft, which is linked to the runway by a 244.5 m (802 ft) long taxiway.

In September 2020, the Airports Authority of India (AAI) announced an expansion project that included the expansion of the runway and taxiway, construction of new parking bays, Air Traffic Control (ATC) tower, and terminal building at a total cost of ₹3.81 billion (US$40 million). About 600.97 acres (243.20 ha) of land was earmarked for the expansion of the airport, and an additional 110 acres (45 ha) of land was set aside for the usage of Indian Air Force and the Indian Coastguard. The expansion project was initiated on 25 July 2020. A technical block and a fire station were also constructed as a part of the project. Night landing facilities were established at the airport in 2020 with the first night landing on 3 July 2020. Regular night services from the airport started in March 2026.

The new terminal building covers an area of 17,341 m^{2} (186,660 sq ft), and is capable of handling up to 1,400 passengers per hour. It is equipped with three aerobridges, four entry gates, seven baggage scanners, and 21 check-in counters. Indian prime minister Narendra Modi inaugurated the new terminal building on 26 July 2025.

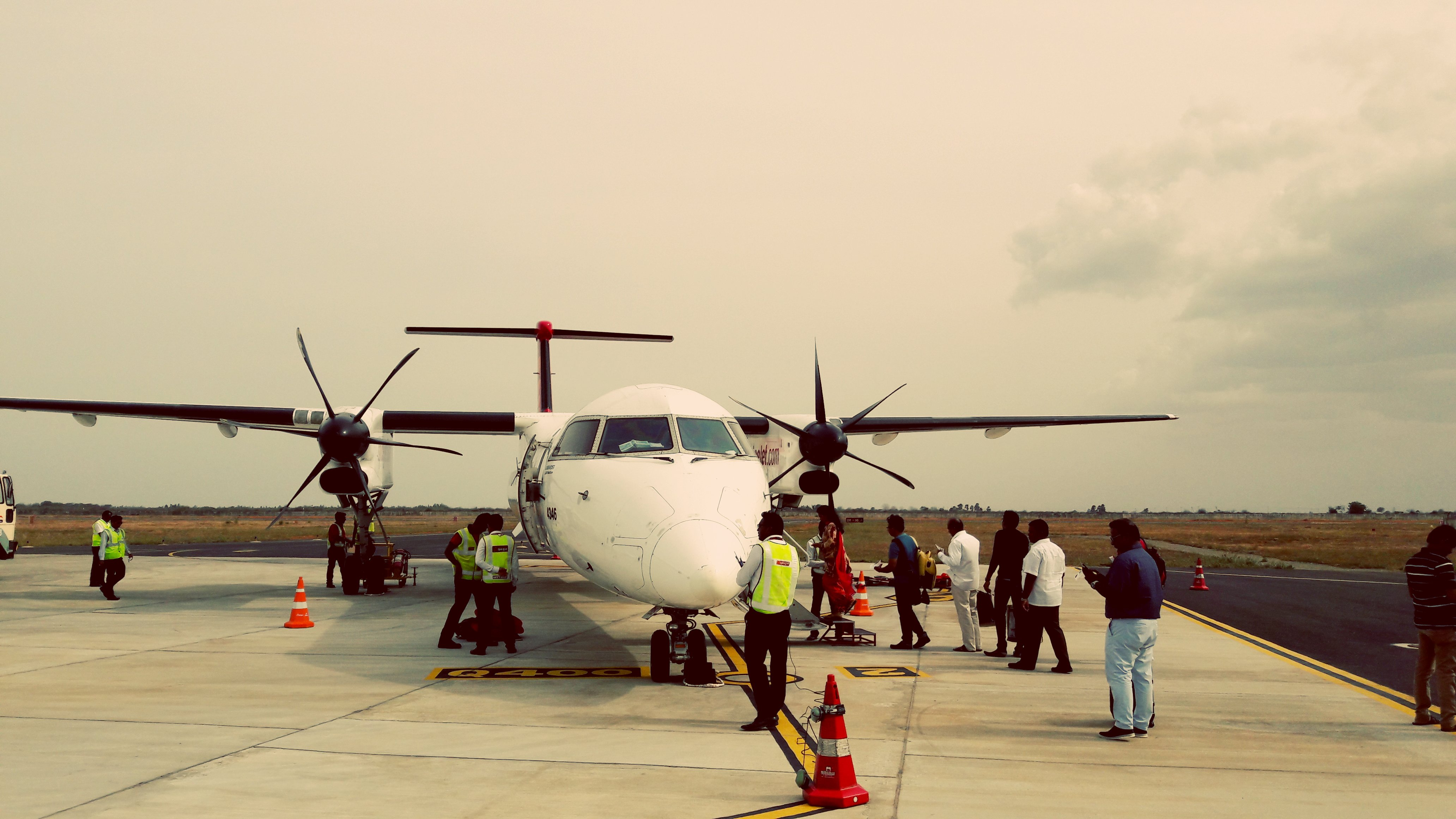
An aircraft parked at the apron

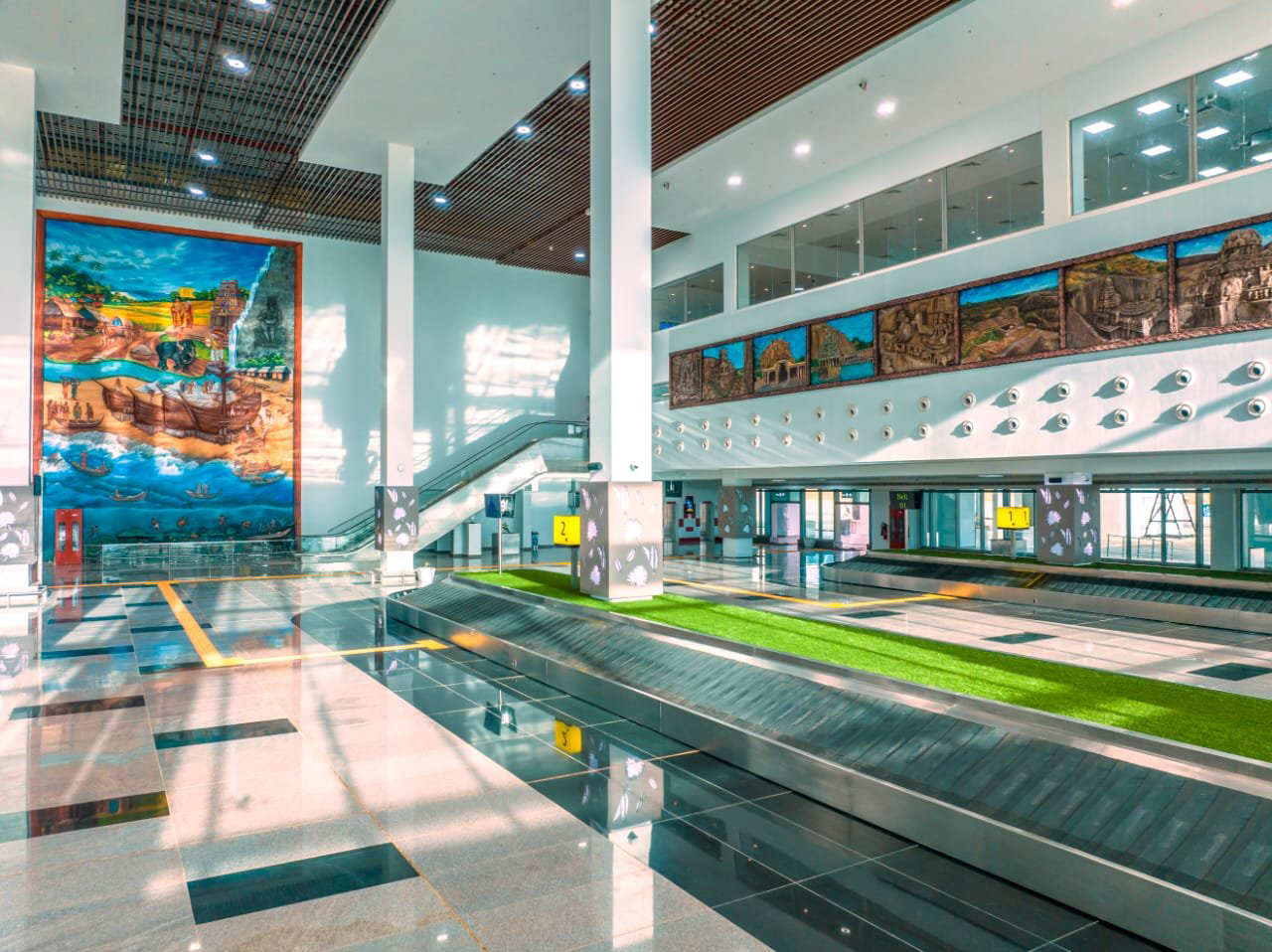
Interior of the new terminal

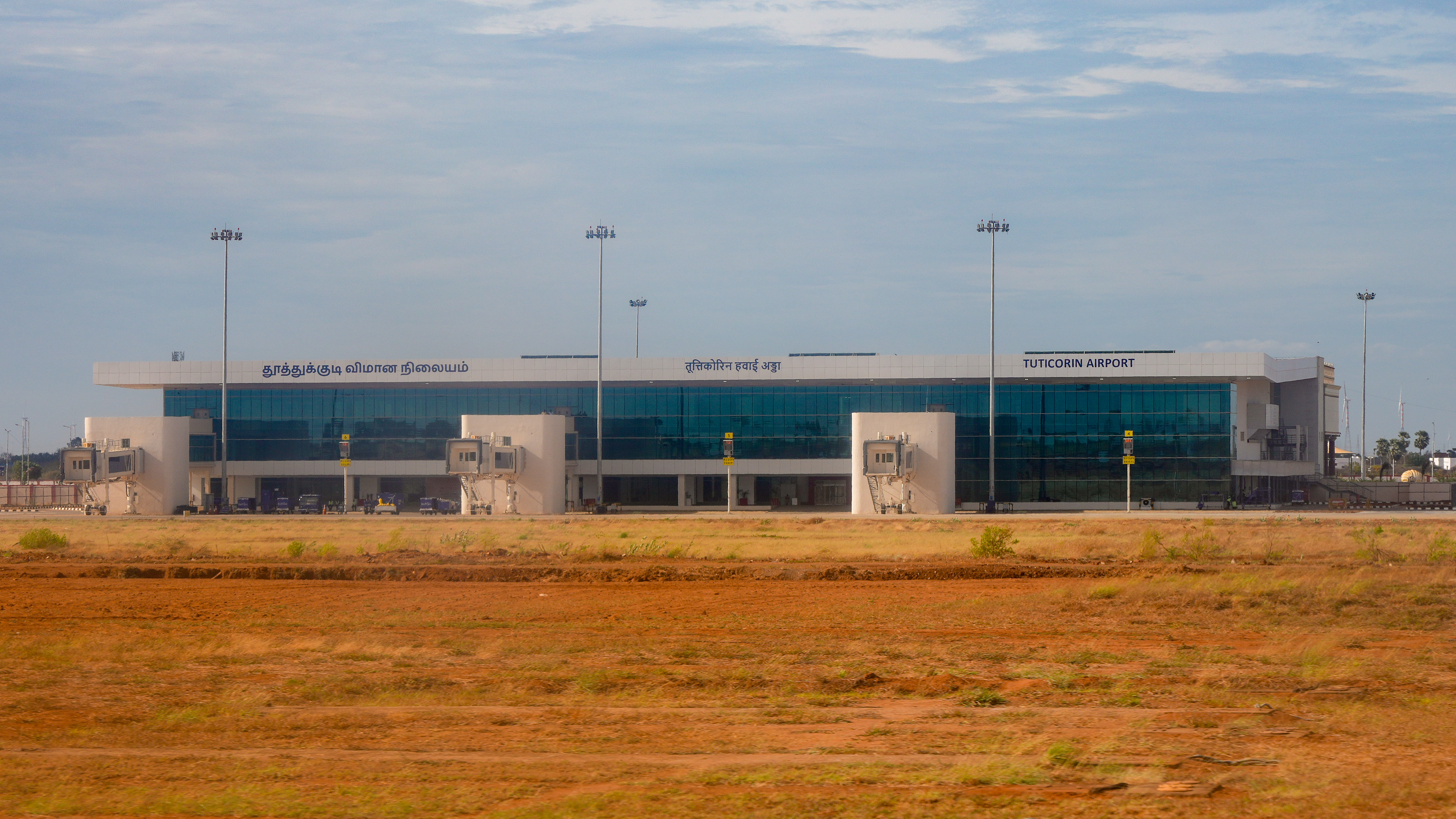
Airside facade of the new terminal

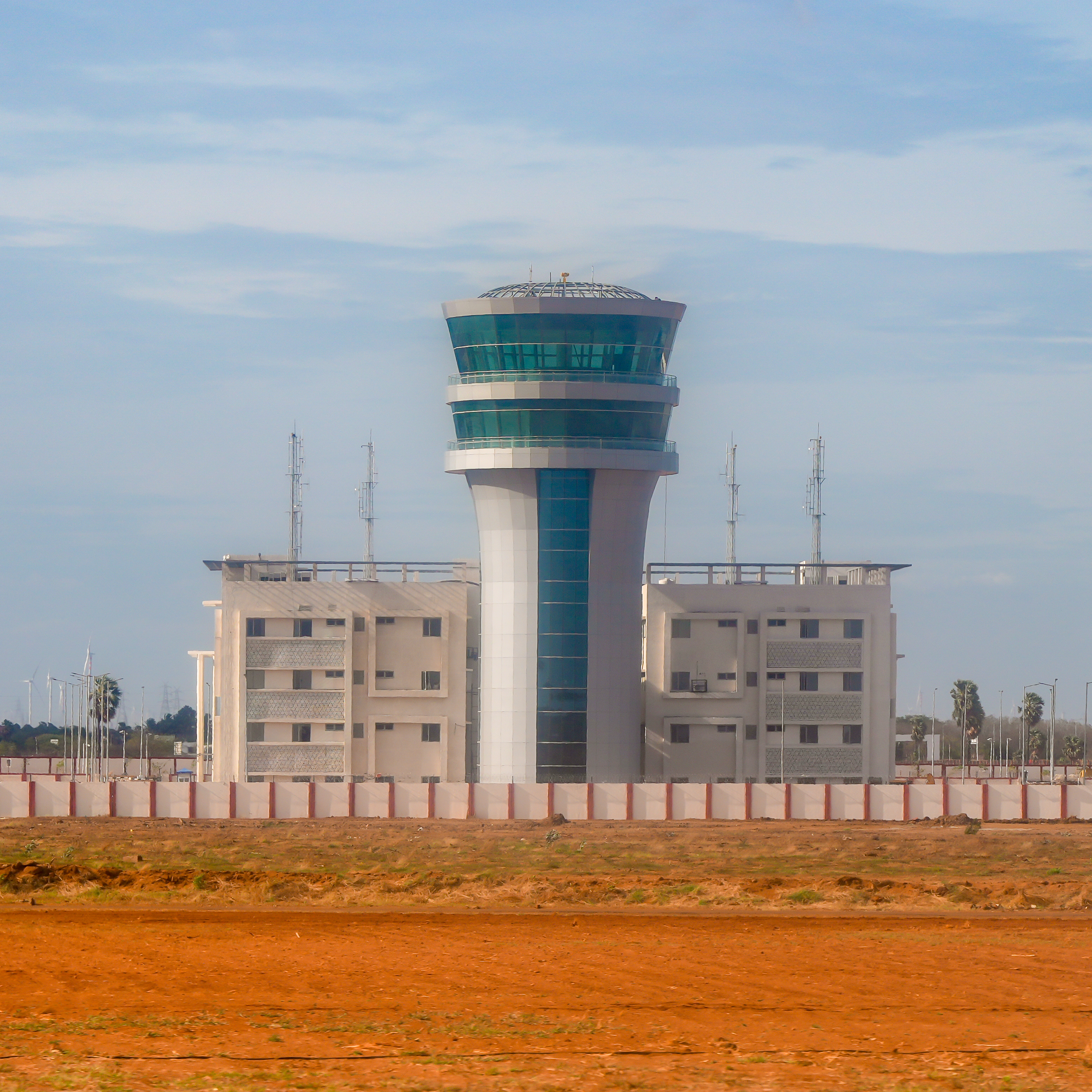
Air Traffic Control tower

== Airlines and destinations ==
| Airlines | Destinations |
|---|---|
| IndiGo | Bengaluru, Chennai |

== See also ==
- Airports in India
- Air transport in India
- List of airlines of India
- Transport in Thoothukudi
- List of airports in Tamil Nadu
- List of busiest airports in India by passenger traffic
