= Kovilpatti railway station =

Railway station in Tamil Nadu, India

Kovilpatti Koovilpati
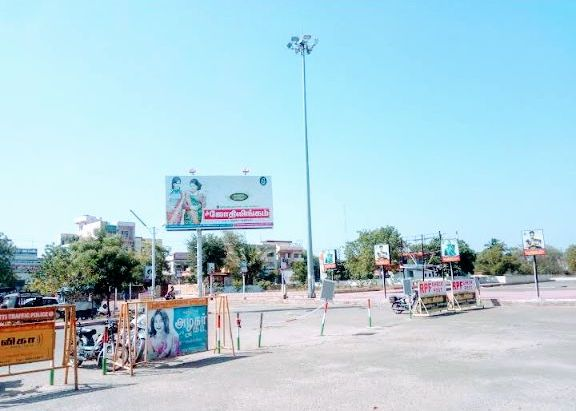
- Main entrance of the station

General information
- Other names: Covilpatti
- Location: Velayuthapuram Main road, Kovilpatti, Thoothukudi district (Tuticorin), Tamil Nadu, India; India
- Coordinates: 9.1826°N 77.8731°E
- Elevation: 90 metres (300 ft)
- System: Indian Railways station
- Owner: Indian Railways
- Operator: Southern Railway Zone
- Line: Virudhunagar Junction - Vanchi Maniyachchi Junction
- Platforms: 3
- Tracks: 4
- Connections: Taxicab stand, Auto rickshaw stand, Frequently Mini Buses

Construction
- Structure type: Standard (on ground)
- Parking: Available
- Accessible: Yes

Other information
- Status: Functioning
- Station code: CVP
- Zone(s): Southern Railway Zone
- Division(s): Madurai

History
- Opened: 1876; 150 years ago
- Rebuilt: 2022; 4 years ago

Passengers
- 2022–23: 873,548 (per year); 2,393 (per day)
Route map
Location
- Location within Tamil Nadu Location within India

Kovilpatti railway station (station code: CVP) is an NSG–3 category Indian railway station in Madurai railway division of Southern Railway zone. It serves Kovilpatti, Thoothukudi City and the surrounding towns and villages in the Kovilpatti region. The station belongs to the Madurai railway division, a part of Southern Railway Zone.This station was first opened on 01.01.1876 along with Madurai junction to Tuticorin section before independence.

== Projects and development ==
It is one of the 73 stations in Tamil Nadu to be named for upgradation under Amrit Bharat Station Scheme of Indian Railways.

A total of ₹ 12.72 crore have been allocated for the renovation work of Kovilpatti railway station under the Amrit Bharat scheme.

== Performance and earnings ==
For the FY 2022–23, the annual earnings of the station was ₹224,378,641 (US$2.3 million) and daily earnings was ₹614,736 (US$6,400). For the same financial year, the annual passenger count was 873,548 and daily count was 2,393. While, the footfall per day was recorded as 4,756.
