= Pearl City Superfast Express =

Indian Express train

Pearl City Express
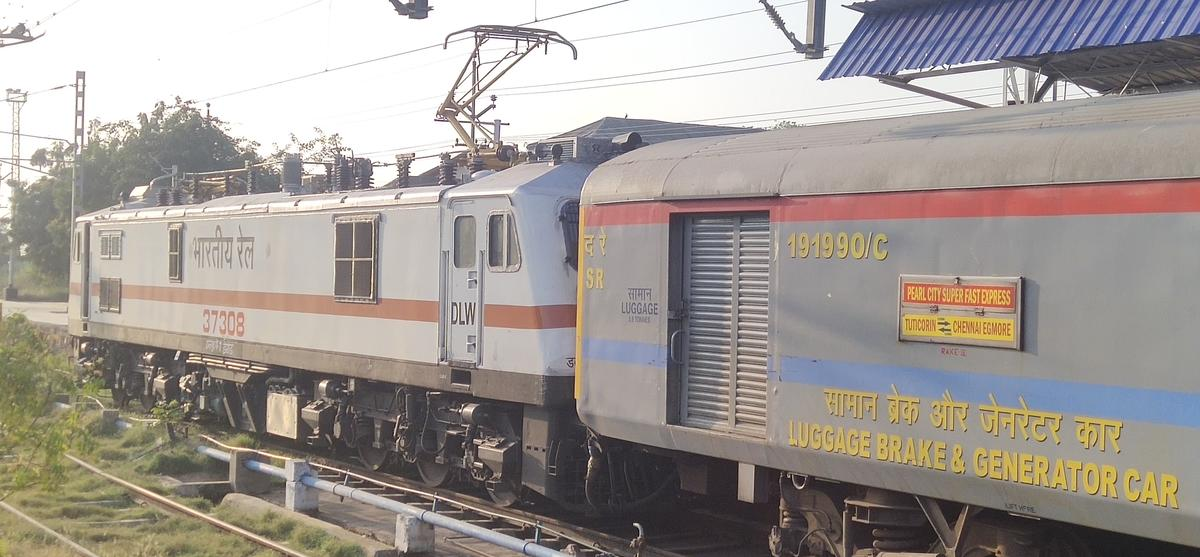
- Pearl City Express with Erode WAP-7 at Tuticorin Railway Station

Overview
- Service type: Superfast Express
- Status: Active
- Locale: Tamil Nadu
- First service: 1 January 1880; 146 years ago
- Current operator: Indian Railways
- Ridership: Superfast Express
- Website: www.indianrailways.gov.in

Route
- Termini: Chennai Egmore (MS); Thoothukudi (TN)
- Stops: 17
- Distance travelled: 652 km (405 mi)
- Average journey time: 11 hours
- Service frequency: Daily
- Train numbers: 12693 (Down); 12694 (Up)
- Lines used: MS - TPJ (Chord Line); TPJ - TN (Main Line)

On-board services
- Classes: 1 1st A/C I Tire (H); 2 2nd A/C II Tire (A); 4 3rd A/C III Tire (B); 9 Sleeper (SL); 3 Unreserved (GS); 2 EOG
- Disabled access: Disabled access
- Seating arrangements: Couchette Car
- Sleeping arrangements: Yes
- Catering facilities: Yes
- Baggage facilities: Overhead racks Baggage carriage
- Other facilities: CCTV Camera in all coaches

Technical
- Rolling stock: ED/WAP-7, Electric Loco Shed, Erode, LHB Coaches
- Track gauge: 1,676 mm (5 ft 6 in)
- Electrification: 25 kV AC, 50 Hz (High Voltage Overhead Electric Traction)
- Operating speed: 73 km/h (45 mph) 130km/h
- Average length: 21 coaches
- Track owner: Indian Railways
- Timetable number: 21/21A
- Rake maintenance: Thoothukudi
Route map
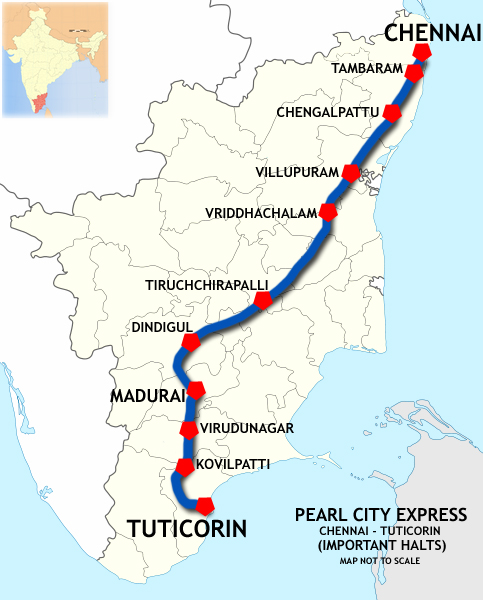
- Pearl City (Muthunagar) Superfast Express (Thoothukudi - Chennai) Route map

The Pearl City Express is an overnight Superfast Express train of the Southern Railway zone of the Indian Railways. The Pearl City (Muthunagar) Superfast Express runs between Thoothukudi and Chennai Egmore.

== Route ==
The main cities and towns connected by this train are Virudunagar, Madurai, Dindigul, Tiruchchirappalli, Vriddhachalam, Villupuram and Chengalpattu The train operates daily and covers a distance of 652 km.

== Rolling stock ==
Pearl City Superfast Express is running end to end with WAP-7 locomotive from Electric Loco Shed, Erode.

== Coach composition ==
The service has all class of coaches in Indian railways like 1 AC I Tire, 2 AC Two-tier coaches, 4 AC Three-tier coaches, 9 Sleeper Coaches, 3 Unreserved and 2 luggage, brake cum generator van.

The Pearl City Express between Chennai Egmore and Thoothukudi has dedicated two independent rakes with primary maintenance at Thoothukudi.

=== Coach composition ===
The train runs consists of 21 carriages:

| Loco | 1 | 2 | 3 | 4 | 5 | 6 | 7 | 8 | 9 | 10 | 11 | 12 | 13 | 14 | 15 | 16 | 17 | 18 | 19 | 20 | 21 |
|---|---|---|---|---|---|---|---|---|---|---|---|---|---|---|---|---|---|---|---|---|---|
| | EOG | UR | UR | S9 | S8 | S7 | S6 | S5 | S4 | S3 | S2 | S1 | B4 | B3 | B2 | B1 | A2 | A1 | H1 | UR | EOG |

== See also ==
- Nellai Express
- Kanniyakumari Express
- Chendur Express
- Pothigai Express
