= Vagaikulam =

- Village
- Vagaikulam, Thoothukkudi, Tamil Nadu, India
- Coordinates: 8°44′10″N 78°00′06″E
- Country: India
- State: Tamil Nadu
- District: Thoothukkudi

Language
  - Official: Tamil
- Time zone: UTC+5:30 (IST)
- PIN: 628102

Vagaikulam is a small village in Thoothukudi district in Tamil Nadu, India. It is in between the cities Tirunelveli and Tuticorin in Tamil Nadu. The distance from Tirunelveli is approximately 28 km, and from Tuticorin is 22 km. Airport of Thoothukudi is in Vagaikulam.

== Airport ==
The village is noted for its domestic airport, which started functioning from April 2006. There is a daily flight service to and from Chennai run by SpiceJet and IndiGo. Spice Jet from and to is being operating the daily service to Bangalore daily. Apart from Chennai, other indigenous routes will also be operational in the near future. The ongoing development to make Tuticorin a Free Trade Port and the increasing number of companies establishing their manufacturing units in Tirunelveli and Tuticroin districts suggests that the airport will have international flights at a future date.

== Location ==
Already the Highway NH-7A run between Tuticorin and Tirunelveli has been widened by two additional lanes. The extension of highways goes up to Kanyakumari and Thiruvananthapuram, Kerala. This is done to manage the increasing amount of cargo movements from Tuticorin port to various locations. It is said that timber logs are carried to far off states like Orissa, West Bengal and other northern states, since the demurrage factor is comparably less in Tuticorin Port. Further the deepening works in port are carried out by a Malaysian company to handle bigger vessels. The area between Tirunelveli and Tuticorin has been increasingly industrialized, and especially Vagaikulam has become an ICD (Inner cargo container terminals) point.
