= V. O. Chidambaranar Port =

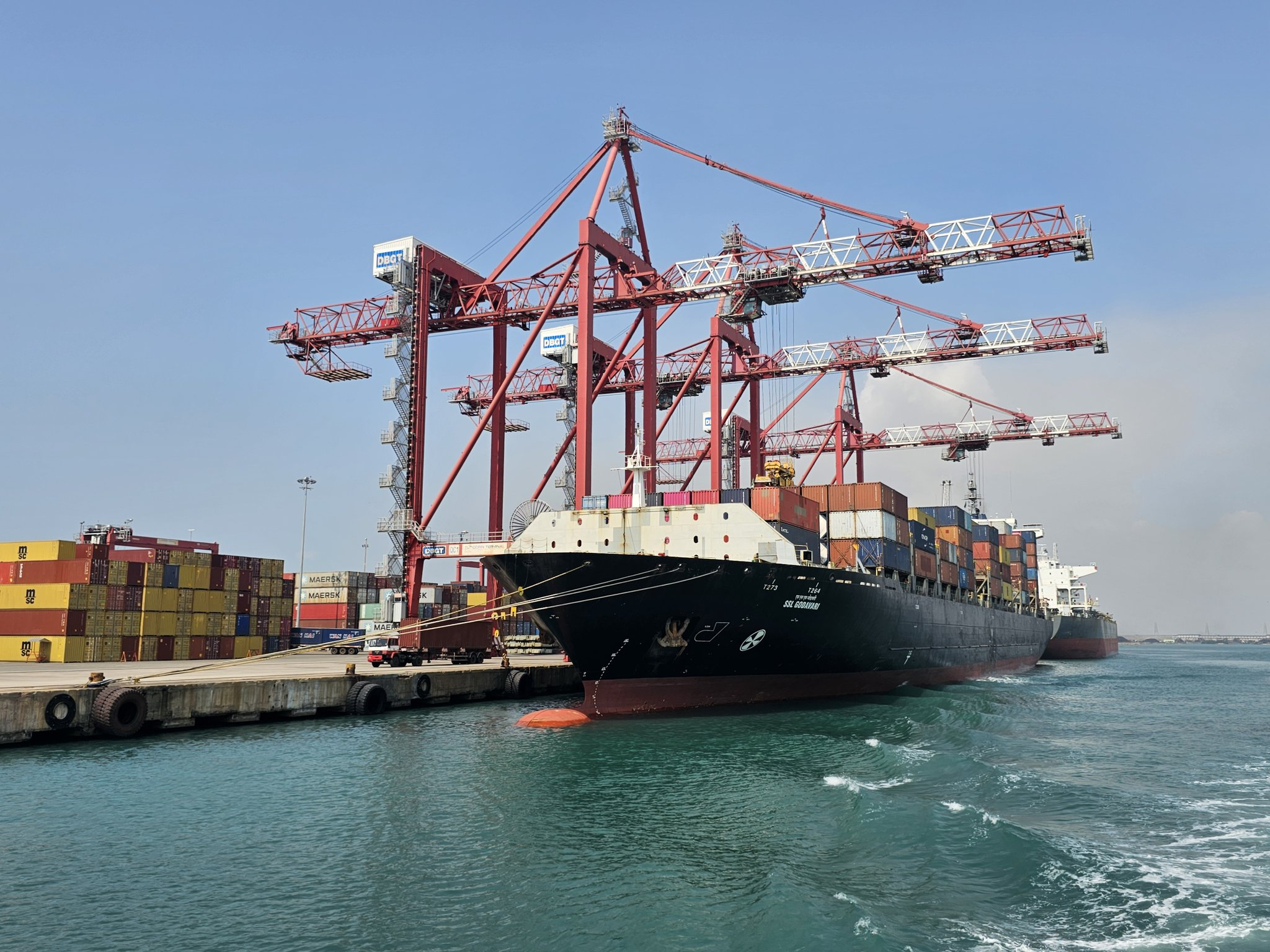
- V.O. Chidambaranar Port
- Interactive map of V. O. Chidambaranar Port

Location
- Country: India
- Location: Thoothukudi, Tamil Nadu
- Coordinates: 8.4730°N 78.1215°E
- UN/LOCODE: INTUT

Details
- Opened: 1974; 52 years ago
- Operated by: V.O. Chidambaranar Port Authority
- Owned by: V.O. Chidambaranar Port Authority, Ministry of Ports, Shipping and Waterways, Government of India
- Type of Harbor: Medium seaport (Artificial)
- Size of harbour: 960 acres (388.8 hectares)
- Land area: 2150 acres (870.75 hectares)
- No. of berths: 13
- No. of wharfs: 7
- No. of piers: 3
- Draft depth: 14.2 metres (47 ft)
- Length of approach channel: 3.80 kilometres (2.36 mi)
- Employees: 476 (2024-23)
- Main trades: Industrial coal, Copper concentrate, Fertiliser, Timber logs, iron ore Major Imports: Coal, Cement, fertilizers, raw fertiliser materials, rock phosphate, petroleum products, petroleum coke, and edible oils Major Exports: General cargo, building materials, liquid cargoes, sugar, granite, limonite ore
- UN/LOCODE: INTUT

Statistics
- Vessel arrivals: 1,524 (2024-23)
- Annual cargo tonnage: 34.119 million (2024–23)
- Annual container volume: 734,274 TEU (2022–23)
- Annual revenue: ▲₹820.49 crore (US$88 million) (2024–23)
- Net income: ▲₹264.79 crore (US$28 million) (2024–23)
- Website https://www.vocport.gov.in/

V. O. Chidambaranar Port is a port in Thoothukudi, Tamil Nadu, and is one of the 13 major ports in India. It was declared to be a major port on 11 July 1974. It is the second largest port in Tamil Nadu and third largest container terminal in India. V.O. Chidambaranar Port is an artificial port. This is the third international port in Tamil Nadu and it is second all-weather port. All V.O. Chidambaranar Port Authority's traffic handling has crossed 10 million tons from 1 April to 13 September 2008, registering a growth rate of 12.08 per cent, surpassing the corresponding previous year handling of 8.96 million tons. It has services to USA, China, Europe, Sri Lanka and Mediterranean countries. The Station Commander, Coast Guard Station Thoothukudi is located at V.O. Chidambaranar Port Authority, Tamil Nadu under the operational and administrative control of the Commander, Coast Guard Region (East), Chennai. The Coast Guard Station V.O. Chidambaranar Port Authority was commissioned on 25 April 1991 by Vice Admiral SW Lakhar, NM, VSM the then Director General Coast Guard. The Station Commander is responsible for Coast Guard operations in this area of jurisdiction in Gulf of Mannar. V.O. Chidambaranar Port Authority Thoothukudi is an ISO 9001:2008, ISO 14001:2004 and International Ship and Port Facility Security (ISPS) Code compliant port.

== History ==
On 8 May 1958, the investigations undertaken by the Tuticorin Port Trust to determine the layout of the port are still in progress.

At the time of Jawaharlal Nehru was the Prime Minister, Kamalapati Tripathi was the Shipping Minister, he started the work of the major port in Tuticorin. Jawaharlal Nehru then said that he was giving this port to the people of Tamil Nadu in the presence of Kamlapati Tripathi and the then Finance Minister T. T. Krishnamachari. Even without the approval of the Cabinet, T. T. Krishnamachari sanctioned Rs. 7 crores. On 1 February 1980 the major Port has been completed. It was completed on Indira Gandhi's intervention when she was the Prime Minister.

To cope with the increasing trade through Thoothukudi, the Government of India sanctioned the construction of an all-weather port at Thoothukudi, which brings the second largest revenue to India. On 11 July 1974, the newly constructed Tuticorin Port was declared as the 10th major port of India. On 1 April 1979, the erstwhile Thoothukudi minor Port and the newly constructed Thoothukudi major port were merged and the V.O. Chidambaranar Port Authority was constituted under the Major Port Trusts Act, 1963. The port is named after V. O. Chidambaram Pillai, the eminent freedom fighter who was well known as Kappalottiya Thamizhan, meaning The Tamilian man who rode the ship.

== Changes over the years ==
- 27 January 2011: The Union Cabinet approved for renaming of Tuticorin Port Trust as V.O. Chidambaranar Port Trust.
- 5 March 2022: As per the notification published in the Gazette of India, dated 31 January 2022, V.O. Chidambaranar Port Trust has been renamed as V.O. Chidambaranar Port Authority.

== Location ==
The V.O. Chidambaranar Port Authority in Thoothukudi is located strategically close to the East-West International sea route on Coromandel Coast. Located in Gulf of Mannar, with Sri Lanka on South East and large Indian Landmass on the West, the Port is well sheltered from storms and cyclone winds. The port is operational round the clock all through the year. This port serves the districts of Tuticorin, Tirunelveli, Kanniyakumari, Tenkasi, Virudhunagar, Madurai, Sivagangai, Ramanathapuram, Theni, Dindigul, Erode, Tirupur, Salem, Namakkal, Karur, Nilgris, Thanjavur, Tiruchirappali and Coimbatore. All these districts in Tamil Nadu are well served by this port. Most of the people select this port is because of its location which lies near to the busiest East-West International shipping sea route of the world, and secondly approaching this port is easier than ports located in chennai because of its road and rail connectivity. It is well connected with highways and express ways and has reduced number of toll booths as well as reduced number of vehicle traffic, so goods can be shipped on time.

== Inner harbour layout ==
The V.O. Chidambaranar Port Authority is an artificial deep sea harbour formed with rubble mound type parallel breakwaters projecting into sea up to 4 km. The Length of North Breakwater is 4,098.66 m, length of South Breakwater is 3,873.37 m and the distance between breakwaters is 1,275 m. The port was designed and executed entirely through indigenous efforts. The harbour basin extends to about 400 hectares of protected water area and is served by an approach channel of 2,400 metres length and 183 metres width.

== Operations ==
The inner harbour consist of 14 berths including two container jetties and three coal and oil jetties. The port handles both containers and cruise ships. The container terminal is currently managed by PSA Sical. The container terminal has 3 quay cranes with 44 m reach and four RTG cranes for stacking the containers. The port also has vast area for storage facilities. It has 5,530,000 Sq m of storage area in its premises. The port also has a passenger terminal for cruise ships. Due to its strategic location in the southern peninsula and assured round-the-clock operations, the port has been the nerve centre of economic activity in south Tamil Nadu. The port currently handles seven per cent of the total container traffic in India and is an important reason for investment in the southern districts of Tamil Nadu. The two container berths in the port are of dimension 370 m length and 12.80 m draught. This limits the port in competing against Colombo port, which has 15 m depth. The Tuticorin Port Trust is investing $1 billion for expansion. This was planned in two phases; the first deepened the harbour from a depth of 10.9 m to the current depth of 12.8 m and the second will increase it to 14.5 m. In addition to expansion of the outer harbour, proposed upgrades include construction of breakwaters and lengthening the approach channel. The port has been upgraded to handle vessels longer than 245 m. The advantages of deploying bigger vessels are that the existing restriction on booking can be eliminated and the transshipment at Colombo port can be reduced. The Tuticorin port has the potential to be an international container transshipment hub given its unique geographical location. Activity at the port has grown at a rate of 17% per year over the last five years. A large portion of the operations in the port has been privatised, including handling at the first container terminal by PSA Sical. A second container terminal has been approved for this port and is in operation. Tuticorin port is becoming a gateway for South India to the US, Europe and the Mediterranean following direct sailings to these regions. Of the total exports from the port, 25% were to Europe, 20% to the US, 20% to East Asia including China, 15% to Colombo, 10% to West Asia and the remainder to the Mediterranean.

With this expansion in place, the capacity of the port would double from the existing 20.55 million tonnes to 40.60 million tonnes of cargo. Once dredging is completed, the port will be able to handle fourth-generation container vessels with a capacity of 5,000 Twenty-foot equivalent units (TEUs) to 6,000 TEUs. Currently, the port can handle container vessels up to 3,000 TEUs capacity. For capacity augmentation, Tuticorin Port has taken up various infrastructural development projects under the National Maritime Development Programme (NMDP). The Port achieved a record of handling 5 lakh TEU's in 2012-2013 surpassing the target fixed by Shipping Ministry. The port on 18 February 2016 surpassed the previous fiscal's traffic of 32.41 million tonnes and this feat was achieved 42 days ahead of the fiscal-end. The port had maintained an impressive cargo growth at 17.18 percent.

A naval base is to be set up under the ambit of Eastern Naval Command to strengthen the surveillance in the Gulf of Mannar and to safeguard any possible aggression in the region. V.O. Chidambaranar Port Authority officials expressed their willingness to allot a 24-acre (97,000 m^{2}) plot on the 'port estate' area for the establishment of the Naval Base.

The port is also helping increase the tourism in the region. A new ferry has been commenced between Thoothukudi and Colombo.

== Outer harbour ==
At present there are 14 berths with capacity of 33.34 million tonnes per annum (MTPA), all situated within two breakwaters in V.O. Chidambaranar Port Authority. The Port which began with the mono commodity of coal for the Thoothukudi Thermal Power Station has diversified and the cargo profile of the Port consists of import cargo, viz. Thermal Coal, Timber Logs, Petroleum Products, LPG and various other bulk, break bulk and containerized cargoes and export cargoes viz. Granite, Salt, Sugar (Raw) Cement in bags, containerized cargo and construction materials. The Port's hinterland comprises southern parts of State of Tamil Nadu, Kerala and also some regions in the State of Karnataka.

The facility available at the Port has propelled industrial growth in the region and is also emerging as power Hub of South India. In order to augment the increased demand of the EXIM trade, the Port is increasing the capacity to 85 million tonnes per annum by 2015–16 by commissioning new 5 berths under PPP mode and upgrading the existing facilities. During Budget speech in Feb 2013, the Hon’ble Union Finance Minister had also announced the Development of Outer Harbour project in V.O. Chidambaranar Port Authority for Rs. 7,500 Crores

As the capacity augmentation in the present harbor has reached the saturation level and to meet the future demands, the Port has proposed to develop an Outer Harbour by extending the present breakwaters. The port has engaged M/s.I – maritime consultancy Pvt Ltd, NaviMumbai for preparation of DPR (Detailed Project Report). The consultant submitted the final DPR in Dec 2013. The total length of breakwater is 9,911 meters with Northern Breakwater to be extended by 4512 meters and Southern Breakwater by 5399 meters, is also to be constructed. The existing channel has to be widened to 300 meters and a new turning circle has to be constructed of 680 meters dia. The total project cost for Phase 1, Phase 2, Phase 3 and Phase 4 is worked out as INR 23431.92 Core. The Number of berths proposed, type of cargo proposed, and period of execution etc. for the four Phases of Projects and Traffic Fore Cast for the Outer Harbour Project as proposed in DPR as follows.

Along with the development of Outer Harbour the surrounding region in an around the port will develop which in turn will lead to over all industrial development of the region as a whole. The Phase 1 expenditure to be borne by the Port inclusive of interest during construction works out to Rs. 7,241.89 Crores. The investment in phase 1 to be borne by the port is towards construction of breakwater (2,464.93 Crores), dredging cost (3,221.33 Crores), roads cost (30.45 Crores) and Port crafts (293.10 Crores) with a total cost of Rs. 6,010 Crores excluding interest during construction (IDC). The phase 1 expenditure to be borne by PPP operator works out to Rs. 4393.71 Crores including IDC. The main investment by the port has to be incurred in Phase-I only, which include for breakwater, dredging & road. The port has to make one time investment for breakwater, Dredging and road in phase 1 itself. About 98% of total investment by port has to be done in phase 1 only and is scheduled from 2019 – 2024. The Project IRR for Phase 1 is 14.6% (without grant) for 30 years with project NPV of -2,510 crores. The consultant also suggested that, for financial viability of the project, the port has to explore the possibility for financing the project through budgetary support or through international institutions for port's investment and for berths etc., it will be through Private Public participation (PPP).

The V.O. Chidambaranar Port Authority at Thoothukudi is poised for further growth with the allocation of Rs. 11,635 crore for the first phase of the Outer Harbour Project in the Union budget 2014–15.

Port Trust Chairman S. Ananda Chandra Bose said the announcement would help in the development of the region. A detailed project report had already been submitted. The project would facilitate the establishment of power stations in Thoothukudi and boost activities on the Thoothukudi-Madurai industrial corridor.

== International service ==
- V.O. Chidambaranar Port Authority is the only port in South India to provide a direct weekly container service to the United States (transit time 22 days).
- There are regular weekly direct services to Europe (transit time 17 days), China (transit time 10 days) and Red Sea Ports (transit time 8 days).

== See also ==
- Transport in India
- List of ports in India
- Sagar Mala project
