= Tuticorin railway station =

Train station serving the city of Thoothukudi, Tamil Nadu, India

Tuticorin Railway Station Tūttukkuṭi Rayil Nilaiyam

General information
- Location: North Raja Street, Keelur, Thoothukudi - 628001, Tamil Nadu, India
- Coordinates: 8.8060°N 78.1553°E
- Elevation: 4 metres (13 ft)
- System: Indian Railways Station
- Owner: Ministry of Railways (India)
- Operator: Indian Railways
- Line: Thoothukudi – Vanchi Maniyachi line
- Platforms: 3 Side platforms
- Tracks: 6
- Connections: Taxi Cab Stand and Auto Rickshaw Stand

Construction
- Structure type: Standard (on ground station)
- Parking: Available
- Cycle facilities: Available
- Accessible: Disabled access

Other information
- Status: Functioning
- Station code: TN
- Zone(s): Southern Railway Zone
- Division(s): Madurai

History
- Opened: 1876; 150 years ago
- Closed: 2023
- Rebuilt: Upgrading
- Former names: Tuticorin Railway Station (until 2018)

Passengers
- 2022–23: 712,374 (per year); 3,623 (per day) ▲900% (-)
- Rank: 5
Route map
Location
- Location within India Location within Tamil Nadu

Tuticorin railway station (station code: TN) is an NSG–3 category Indian railway station in Madurai railway division of Southern Railway zone. The station serves the city of Thoothukudi, located in Thoothukudi district of the Indian state of Tamil Nadu. This station was first opened on 1 January 1876. along with Madurai junction to Tuticorin section before independence.

== Train services ==
Train	Destination(s)
Pearl City Express	Chennai Egmore
Mysuru–Tuticorin Express	Mysuru
Mettupalayam–Tuticorin Express	Mettupalayam
Okha–Tuticorin Vivek Express	Okha
Tuticorin–Kacheguda Express	Kacheguda
Palaruvi Express	Palakkad Junction
Tuticorin-Tirunelveli Passenger	Tirunelveli Junction

== Performance and earnings ==
For the FY 2022–23, the annual earnings of the station was ₹321,265,127 (US$3.4 million) and daily earnings was ₹880,178 (US$9,400). For the same financial year, the annual passenger count was 712,374 and daily count was 1,952. While, the footfall per day was recorded as 3,623.

== Amenities ==
The station has a computerised reservation center, ATMs, water vending machine, dormitories, cloak room and magazine kiosks. Also it has pitline maintenance facility for cleaning and maintenance of rail coaches.

== New Railway lines in proposal ==
1. Madurai-Arupukottai-Tuticorin new BG Line, this 145 kms new stretch is under construction.

2. Karaikudi-Devakottai-Ramanathapuram-Tuticorin new BG line: Reconnaissance Engineering cum Traffic Survey for a new BG line between Karaikkudi and Tuticorin via Devakkottai and Ramanathapuram (214.81 km) was conducted and Survey Report was sent to Railway Board on 30.08.2011. This project was shelved by Railway Board.

== Projects and development ==
It is one of the 75 stations in Tamil Nadu to be named for upgradation under Amrit Bharat Station Scheme of Indian Railways.

12 crore rupees have been allocated for the renovation work of Tuticourin railway station under the Amrit Bharat scheme.
