= Sathankulam taluk =

Sathankulam taluk is a taluk of Thoothukudi district of the Indian state of Tamil Nadu. The headquarters of the taluk is the town of Sathankulam. It was created on 28 July 1979

== Demographics ==
According to the 2011 census, the taluk of Sathankulam had a population of 98,583 with 47,444 males and 51,139 females. There were 1078 women for every 1000 men. The taluk had a literacy rate of 81.18. Child population in the age group below 6 was 4,941 Males and 4,746 Females.

== Firka ==
=== Revenue Blocks ===
- Pallakurichi
- Sathankulam
- SriVenkadeswarapuram

== Villages ==
=== Villages in Sathankulam Taluk ===
Sl No	Village Name
1	Arasoor I
2	Arasoor II
3	Chettiyiruppu
4	Eluvaraimukki
5	Karungadal
6	Kattarimangalam
7	Komaneri
8	Kombankulam
9	Kommadikottai
10	Meerankulam - I
11	Meerankulam - II
12	Mudalur
13	Naduvakkurichi
14	Nedunkulam
15	Padukkapathu
16	Palankulam
17	Pallakuruchi
18	Pannamparai
19	Pidaneri
20	Pudukulam
21	Sasthavinallur
22	Sathankulam (TP)
23	Sattankulam
24	Srivenkateshwarapuram
25	Thatchamozhi
26	Thiruppaniputhantharuvai
