= Christianagaram =

Coordinates: 8°26′N 78°02′E

Christianagaram is a village in Thoothukudi District in Tamil Nadu, India.
