= Athimarapatti =

- village
- Location in Tamil Nadu, India Athimarapatti (India)
- Coordinates: 8°43′47″N 78°7′1″E
- Country: India
- State: Tamil Nadu
- District: Thoothukudi

Population (2001)
  - Total: 17,527

Languages
  - Official: Tamil
- Time zone: UTC+5:30 (IST)

Athimarapatti is a panchayat town in Thoothukudi district, in the state of Tamil Nadu, India. The Thoothukudi district was formally known as Tuticorin and is often referred to as "Pearl City". It's a sea port city that serves the inland cities of Coimbatore, Madurai and Tirunelveli. It is also one of the oldest cities in what is now known as India, having a history dating back to 6th century BCE.

The PIN Code (equivalent of a postal code or zip code) of Athimarapatti is 628005. This PIN is shared with Muthiahpuram and Mullaakadu.

The weather in the state of Tamil Nadu, and subsequent districts is generally hot and humid year round. From October to December of each year the state experiences its rainy reason with heavy rainfall brought on by monsoons resulting in 800mm to 1000mm of rainfall. From January to May the state enters its dry season with an average temperature in the mid thirties and sometimes exceeding forty degrees celsius.

== Demographics ==
As of 2001 India census, Athimarapatti had a population of 17,527. Males constitute 51% of the population and females 49%. Athimarapatti has an average literacy rate of 68%, higher than the national average of 59.5%; with 53% of the males and 47% of females literate. 13% of the population is under 6 years of age.
