= Pandarampatti =

- village
- Location in Tamil Nadu, India Pandarampatti (India)
- Coordinates: 8°49′29″N 78°6′17″E
- Country: India
- State: Tamil Nadu
- District: Thoothukudi

Population
  - Total: 2,000

Languages
  - Official: Tamil
- Time zone: UTC+5:30 (IST)
- Postal code: 628002
- Website: www.chittukkuruvi.com
- TNDTA PRIMARY SCHOOL PANDARAMPATTI THOOTHUKUDI.

Pandarampatti is a village in Thoothukudi District of Tamil Nadu, India. It has a population of around 2000. In the early days agriculture was the mainstay economy, but due to the industrialization of Tuticorin people go to work in Tuticorin Port and other industries around the town.

== Geography ==
Pandarampatti is located 7 km from Tuticorin, it is 8 km from the Bay of Bengal.

=== Common Agricultural Crops ===
- Maize
- Tomato
- Chilly
- Kodo Mille
- Blackgram
- Bulrush / Spiked Millet
- Greengram
