= Kadambur =

- Town
- Location in Tamil Nadu, India
- Coordinates: 8.98°N 77.87°E
- Country: India
- State: Tamil Nadu
- District: Thoothukudi
- Elevation: 84 m (276 ft)

Population (2001)
  - Total: 4,379

Languages
  - Official: Tamil
- Time zone: UTC+5:30 (IST)
- PIN: 628714

Kadambur is a panchayat town in Kayathar taluk of the Thoothukudi district in the Indian state of Tamil Nadu. The temples in and around Kadambur portray the authentic Chola art and architecture. There is also another village with the same name Kadambur in the district of Salem under Gangavalli taluk.

== Geography ==
Kadambur is located at 8.98°N 77.87°E. It has an average elevation of 84 metres (275 feet).

== Demographics ==
As of 2001 India census, Kadambur had a population of 4379. Males constitute 49% of the population and females 51%. Kadambur has an average literacy rate of 68%, higher than the national average of 59.5%: male literacy is 76%, and female literacy is 61%. In Kadambur, 10% of the population is under 6 years of age.

Nearby villages include Kalugasalapuram, Chockalingapuram, Onamaakulam, Kallathikinaru, Malaipatti, Parivillikottai and Kollankinar.

== Utilities ==
=== Hospital ===
- Govt Primary Health Centre
- TN Somasundaram Nadar & Saraswathi Ammamal Memorial Hospital.

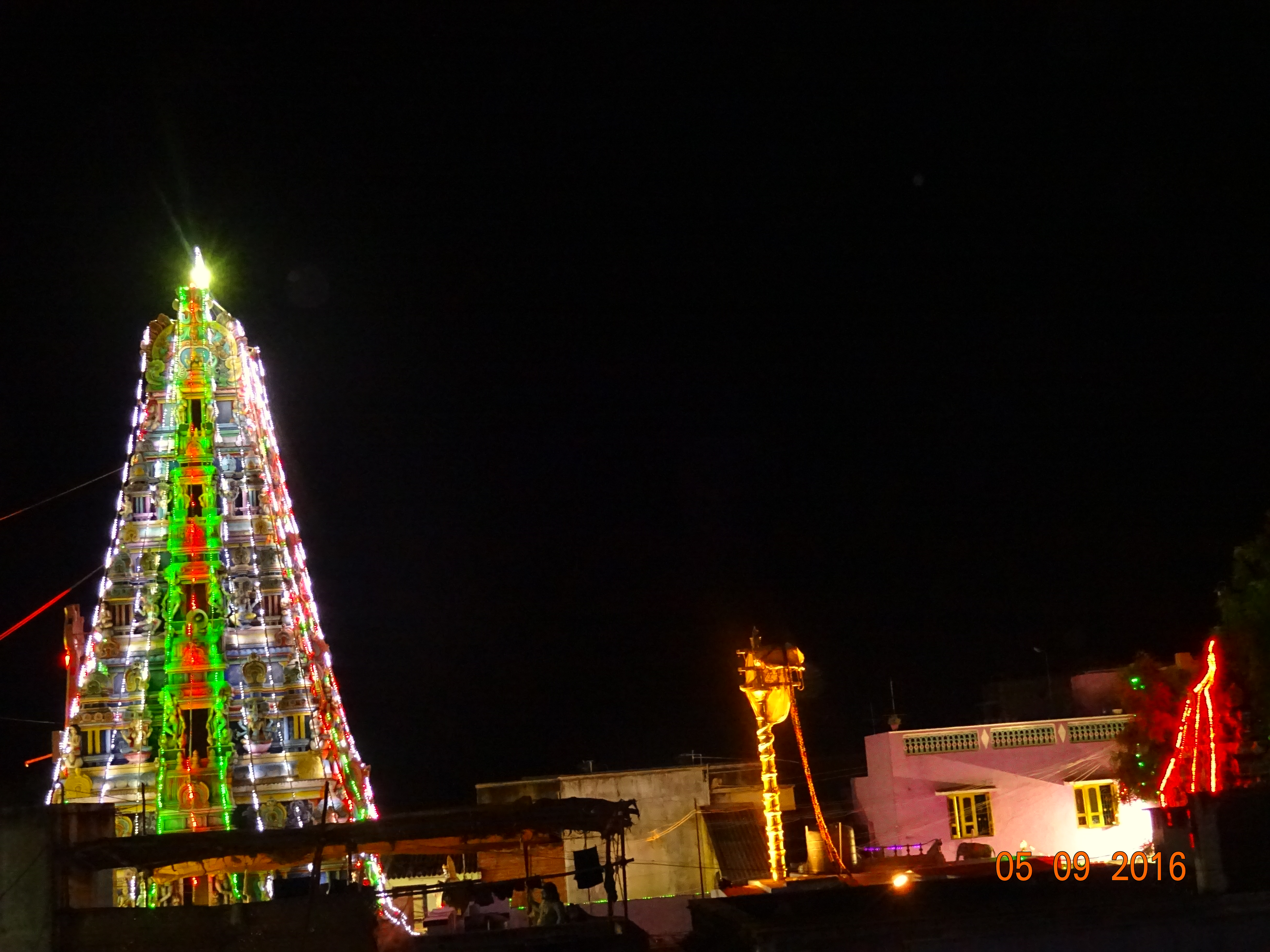

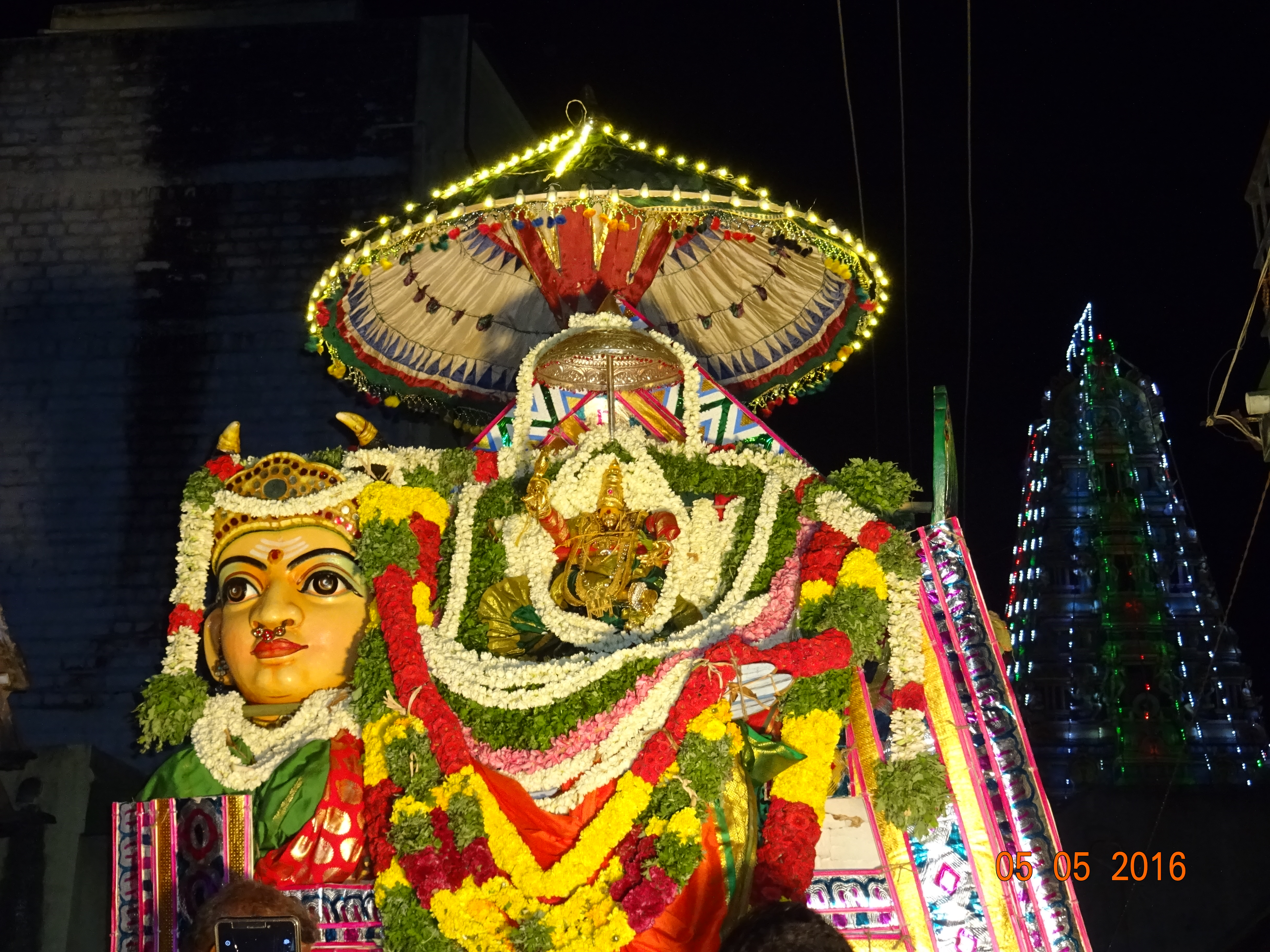

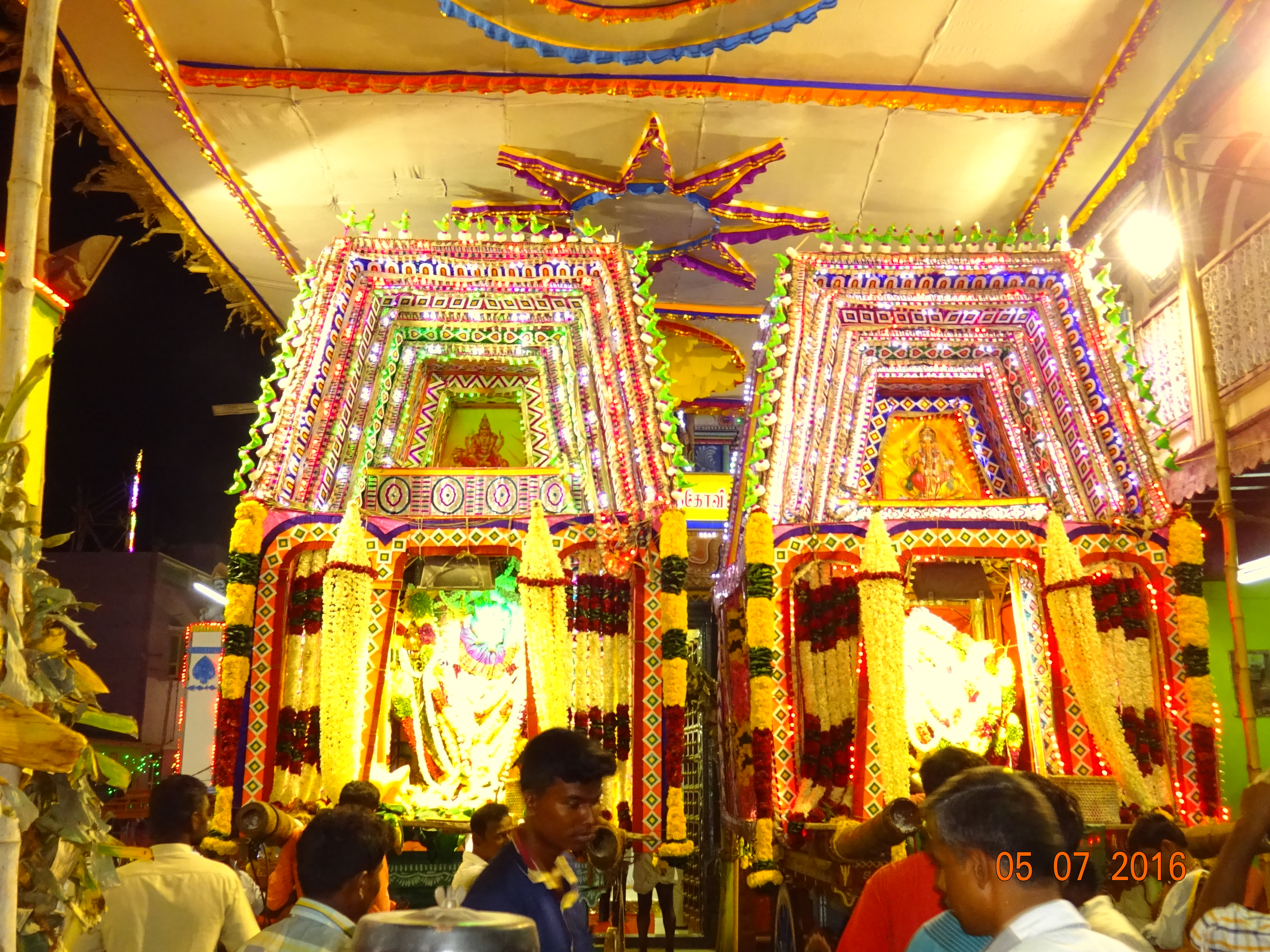

== Transport ==
Kadambur railway station lies in between Kovilpatti and Vanchi Maniyachchi Junction of the Southern Railway Zone of Indian Railways. Tuticorin Airport is the nearest domestic airport. Regular buses run from Kadambur bus station to Tuticorin, Kovilpatti, Idaiseval, and several other places.

Private bus companies running from/to Kadambur include Selva Vinayagar Transport, SSP Transport, Periyaraja Transport, and Veni Transport, Chepparai which links Tirunelveli, Tuticorin, Kovilpatti, Vilathikulam, Pasuvanthanai and other nearby villages.

== Education ==
- Sandrore Middle School (Saraswathi Vidyalaya)
- K.A.R.M.George Middle School
- Hindu Nadar's Higher Secondary School
