= Muttayyapuram =

Muthaiahpuram
- town
- Location in Tamil Nadu, India
- Coordinates: 8°45′11″N 78°09′31″E
- Country: India
- State: Tamil Nadu
- District: Thoothukudi

Population (2001)
  - Total: 30,314

Languages
  - Official: Tamil
- Time zone: UTC+5:30 (IST)

Muthaiahpuram is a panchayat town in Thoothukudi district in the Indian state of Tamil Nadu.

== Demographics ==
As of 2001 India census, Muttayyapuram had a population of 30,314. Males constitute 52% of the population and females 48%. Muttayyapuram has an average literacy rate of 70%, higher than the national average of 59.5%: male literacy is 74%, and female literacy is 66%. In Muttayyapuram, 11% of the population is under 6 years of age.
