= Vallanadu Wildlife Sanctuary =

Protected wildlife area in India

- IUCN category IV (habitat/species management area)
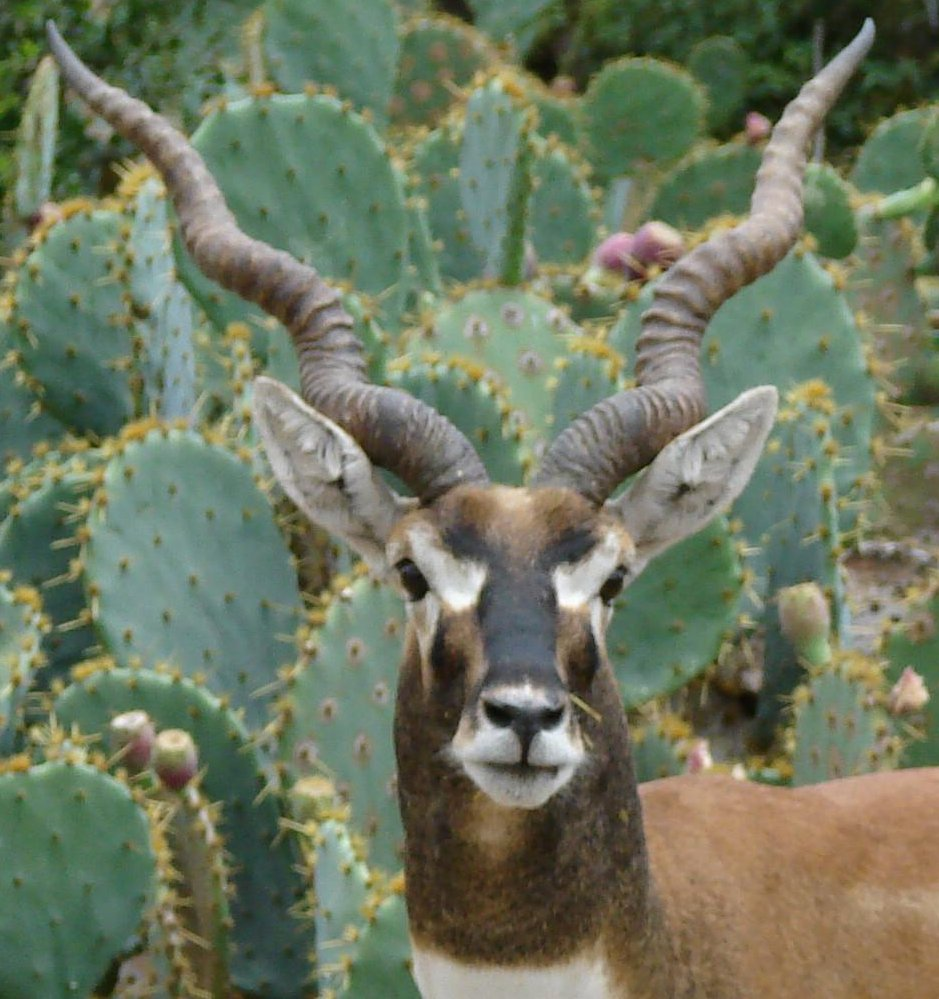
- Blackbuck antelope

- Location within Tamil Nadu Location within India
- Interactive map of Vallanadu Wildlife Sanctuary
- Location: Thoothukudi district, Tamil Nadu, India
- Nearest city: Tirunelveli
- Coordinates: 8°42′9″N 77°53′12″E
- Area: 16.41 square kilometres (6.34 sq mi)
- Governing body: Tamil Nadu Forest Department
- Website: Wild Biodiversity

Vallanadu Wildlife Sanctuary is a protected area of Tamil Nadu in South India created for the protection of blackbuck antelope. Located on an isolated hillock in the eastern ghats section, which is situated near the Vallanadu Village of Srivaikundam Taluk, it is the southernmost place in India where a natural population of blackbuck exists. it is also the southern most hillock of Eastern Ghats.

== Flora ==
The sanctuary is a South Deccan Plateau dry deciduous forest. The thorny hardwood and xerophytes: Dalbergia horrida (see Dalbergia), Dichrostachys cinerea, Vachellia horrida, Acacia planifrons, Albizia amara, Zizyphus sp. and a few Azadirachta indica, Dodonaea viscosa Carissa carandas, Pterolobium hexapetalum, Euphorbia, Acalypha fruticosa and Ocimum tenuiflorum form the undergrowth.

== Fauna ==
Blackbuck, spotted deer, macaque, jungle cat, monkey, wild cat, mongoose, black naped hare, scaly anteater, viper and rat snake live here.

Peafowl, heron, stork, grey partridges, jungle crow, common quails, pied crested cuckoo, crested-hawk eagle, black-winged kite, curlew, lapwing, nightjar, sparrows, horned owl, and nearly 100 other species of birds are found in the area.

The blackbuck population is around 20-40. Thick acacia growth makes it difficult to determine a precise population count. The blackbucks regularly come out of the scrubs and graze in wastelands on the eastern side of the sanctuary.

== Visitor information ==
In 2007 Rs. 7 lakh, earmarked under the Centre's "Development of Sanctuaries" scheme will be spent to repair fencing, increase the height of a watchtower by 14 metres, improve the water supply and erect awareness boards. Also, fruit-yielding tree saplings will be planted to attract more birds.

Nearest airport is at Vagaikulam, Thoothukudi – 22.22 km. Nearest Railway station is Tirunelveli Junction – 16.5 km away.
