= Sayapuram =

Sawyerpuram
- town
- Location in Tamil Nadu, India
- Coordinates: 8°41′N 78°01′E
- Country: India
- State: Tamil Nadu
- District: Thoothukudi

Population (2001)
  - Total: 12,772

Languages
  - Official: Tamil
- Time zone: UTC+5:30 (IST)

Sawyerpuram is a panchayat town in Thoothukudi district in the Indian state of Tamil Nadu.

== Demographics ==
As of 2001 India census, Sawyerpuram had a population of 12,772. Males constitute 49% of the population and females 51%. Sawyerpuram has an average literacy rate of 80%, higher than the national average of 59.5%: male literacy is 82%, and female literacy is 77%. In Sawyerpuram, 11% of the population is under 6 years of age.
