= Iluppaiyurani =

- Town
- Location in Tamil Nadu, India
- Coordinates: 9°11′15″N 77°53′33″E
- Country: India
- State: Tamil Nadu
- District: Thoothukudi

Population (2001)
  - Total: 11,843

Languages
  - Official: Tamil
- Time zone: UTC+5:30 (IST)

Iluppaiyurani is a panchayat town in Thoothukudi district in the Indian state of Tamil Nadu.

== Demographics ==
As of 2001 India census, Iluppaiyurani had a population of 11,843. Males constitute 50% of the population and females 50%. Iluppaiyurani has an average literacy rate of 72%, higher than the national average of 59.5%: male literacy is 78%, and female literacy is 65%. In Iluppaiyurani, 10% of the population is under 6 years of age.
