= Mullakkadu =

Village in Tamil Nadu, India

Coordinates: 8°43′46″N 78°07′16″E

State Highway 176 passing through Mullakadu

Mullakkadu is a village in the Thoothukudi district in the Indian state of Tamil Nadu and is about 8 km from Thoothukudi, near the Indian Ocean.

In 2011, the total population of the village was 2,191. 1,086 were male and 1,105 were female. The literacy rate of Mullakadu was 88.19% (compared to 80.09% for Tamil Nadu).
