= Varandiavel =

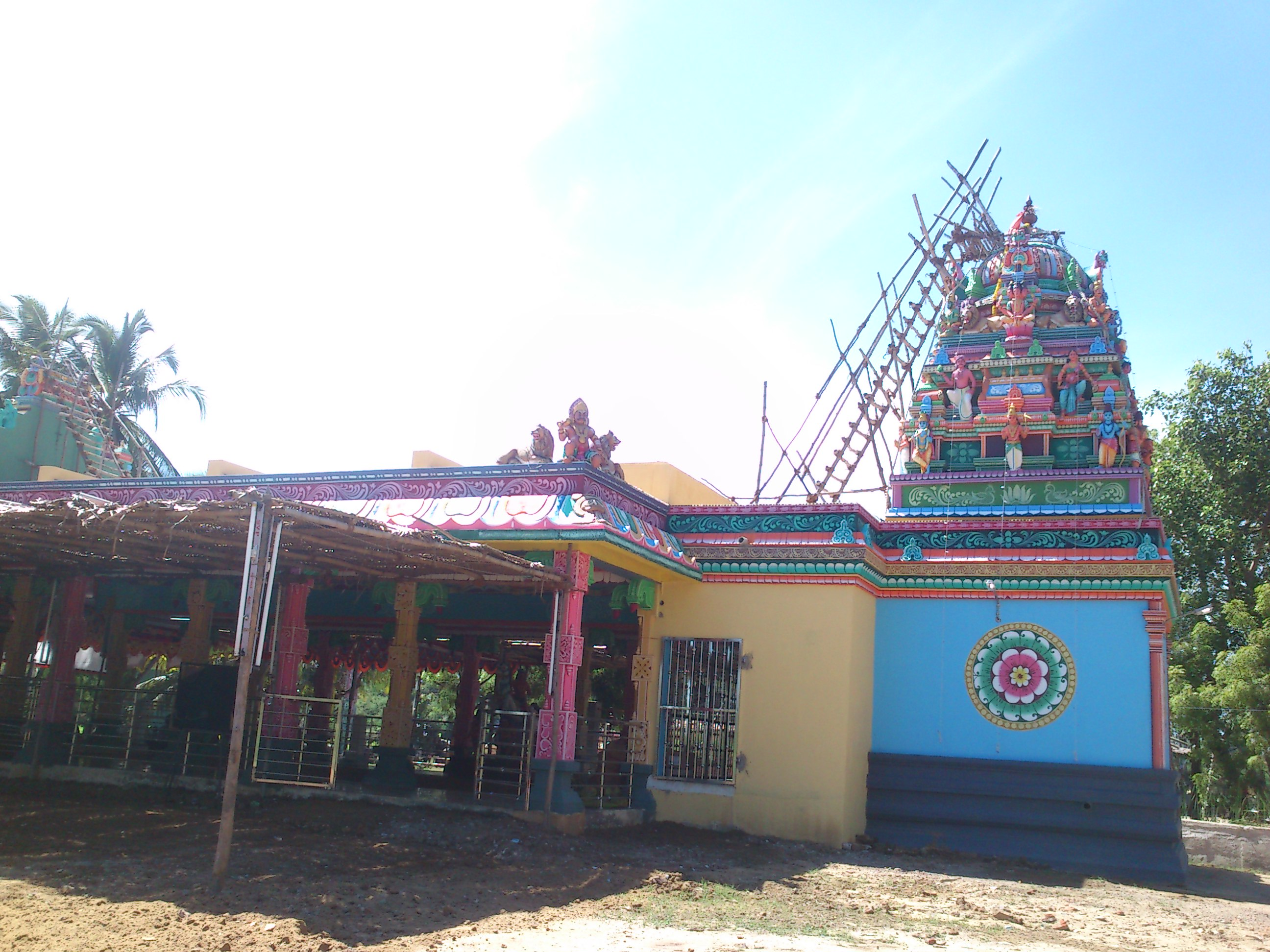
Karmegam temple

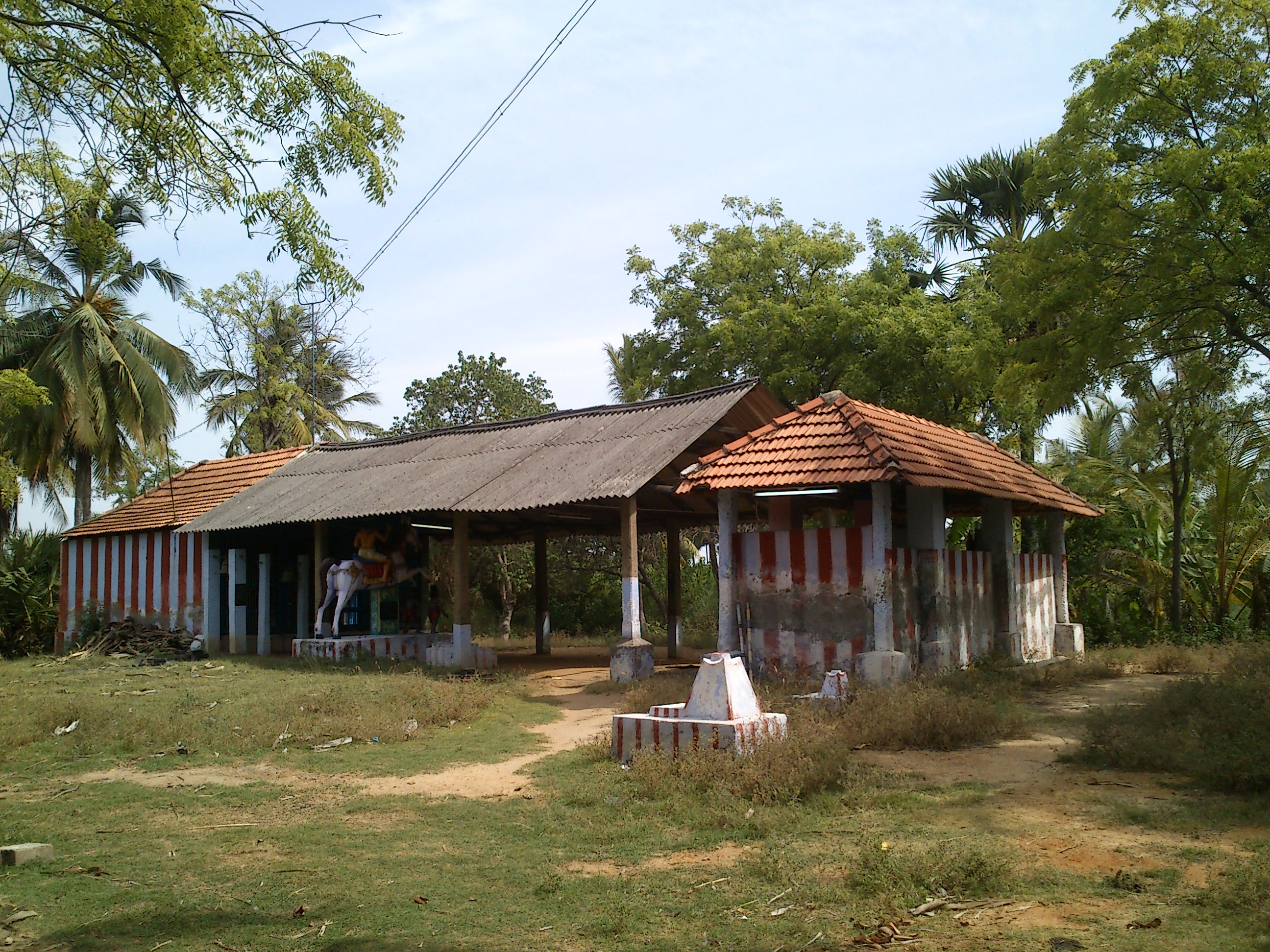
Karmegam Samy (old) Kovil, 2012

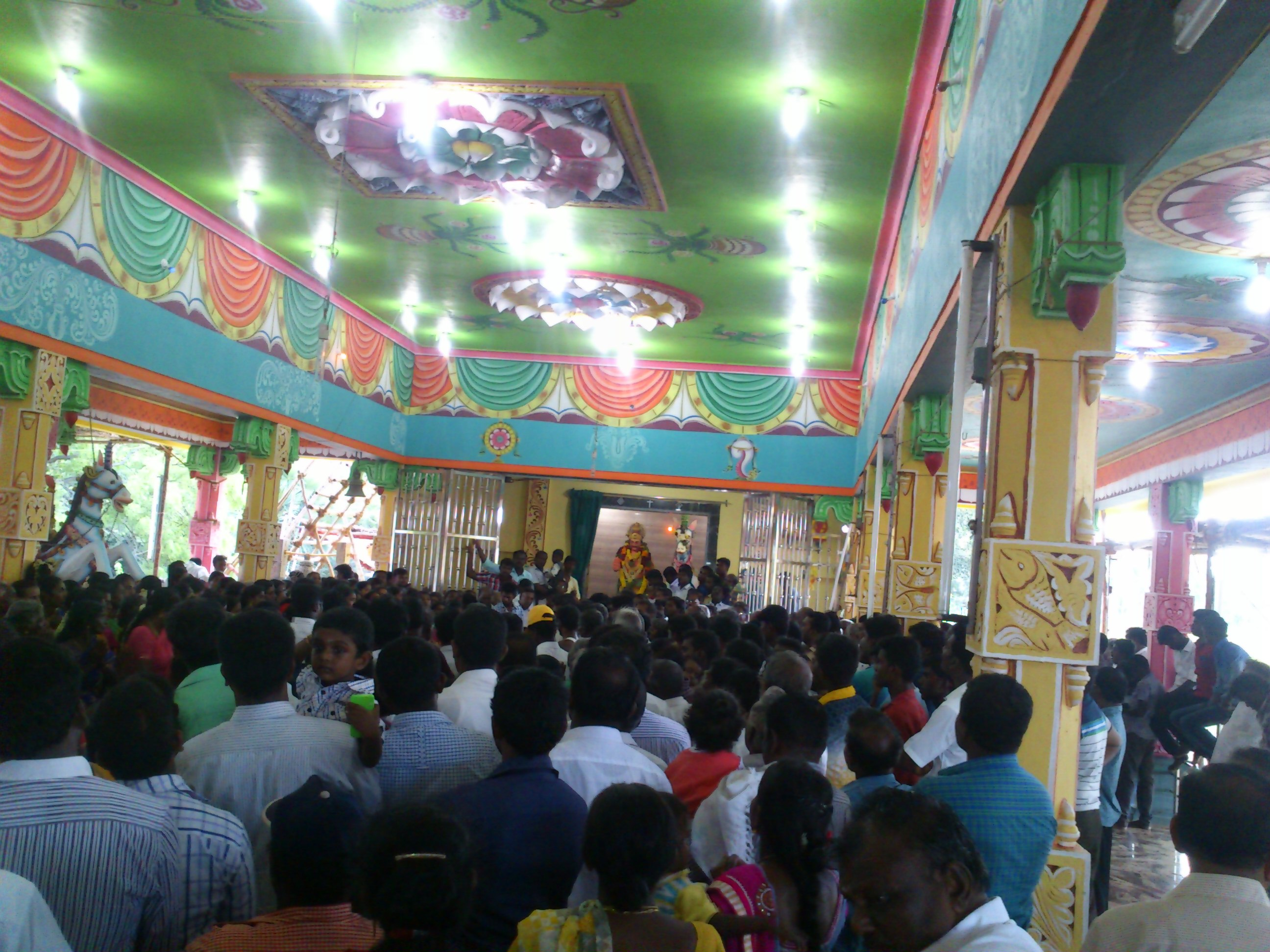
Karmegam Samy Kumbabishekam, 2015

Varandiavel is a panchayat and village in the Thoothukudi district of India.
