= Thenthiruperai =

- Town
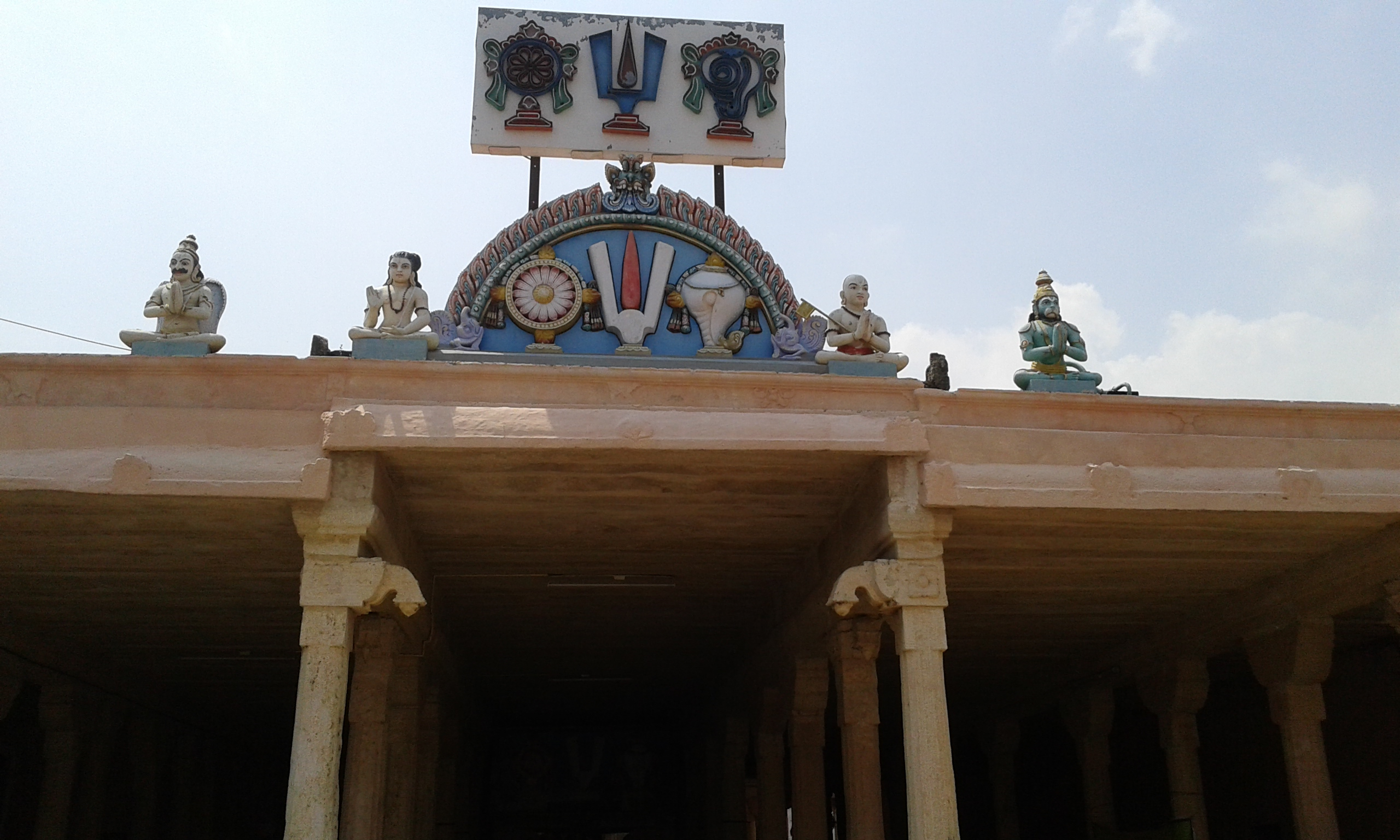

- Location in Tamil Nadu, India
- Coordinates: 8°36′38″N 78°00′05″E
- Country: India
- State: Tamil Nadu
- District: Thoothukudi
- Taluk: Tiruchendur Taluk

Population (2011)
  - Total: 4,934

Languages
  - Official: Tamil
- Time zone: UTC+5:30 (IST)
- PIN: 628623

Thenthiruperai is a panchayat town in Thoothukudi district in the Indian state of Tamil Nadu, 11 km from Tiruvaikuntam and 30 km from Thoothukudi. The village hosts one of the nine Nava Tirupathi temples. It also hosts one of the Navakailasams, Then Thiruperai Sri Kailasanathar Temple, the seventh in the series.

== Demographics ==
- Thenthiruperai had a population of 4,934 as per the 2011 census, out of which 683 are males while 634 are females in the town.
- The population of children aged 0-6 is 158 which is 12.00% of total population of the town.
- The female sex ratio is of 928 against the Tamil Nadu state average of 996. Moreover, the child sex ratio in Thenthiruperai is around 927 compared to Tamil Nadu state average of 943.

Religions in Komaralingam (2011)
Religion	Percent
Hinduism	93.98%
Christianity	5.61%
Buddhism	0.04%
Islam	0.30%
Other or not stated	0.06%

- The literacy rate of the town is 86.80% against the state average of 80.09%. The male literacy is around 91.51% while the female literacy rate is 81.72% .
- The Schedule Caste (SC) constitutes about 79.20% of the population, while the Schedule Tribe (ST) were 0.68% of total population in the town.
- Hindus formed the majority of the population at 93.98% followed by Muslims at 0.30%, Christians at 5.61% and others at 1% as per the 2011 census.

== Administration ==
Thenthiruperai Town Panchayat has total administration over 1,276 houses to which it supplies basic amenities like water and sewerage. It is also authorize to build roads within Town Panchayat limits and impose taxes on properties coming under its jurisdiction.

== Landmarks ==
=== Makara Nedunkuzhaikathar Temple ===
Makara Nedunkuzhai Kannan Temple, is one of the Nava Tirupathi, nine Hindu temples dedicated to Vishnu on the banks of Thamiraparani river.

=== Sri Kailasanathar Temple, Then Thirupperai ===
This is the seventh in the Nava Kailasam temples, which is dedicated to the God Budha (planet Mercury).

== Politics ==
It is part of Tiruchendur Assembly constituency, which comes under the Thoothukkudi Parliamentary constituency.

== See also ==
- Kallamparai
- P. Sri Acharya
