= Mappilaiurani =

- village
- Location in Tamil Nadu, India Mappilaiurani (India)
- Coordinates: 8°50′27″N 78°08′59″E
- Country: India
- State: Tamil Nadu
- District: Thoothukudi

Population (2001)
  - Total: 26,802

Languages
  - Official: Tamil
- Time zone: UTC+5:30 (IST)

Mappilaiurani is a village in Thoothukudi district in the Indian state of Tamil Nadu.

== Demographics ==
As of 2001 India census, Mappilaiurani had a population of 26,802. Males constitute 50% of the population and females 50%. Mappilaiurani has an average literacy rate of 93%, higher than the national average of 59.5%: male literacy is 97%, and female literacy is 89%. In Mappilaiurani, 14% of the population is under 6 years of age.

== Demand for merger with Thoothukudi Corporation ==
This panchayat along with Korampallam was recommended to be included with newly created Thoothukudi Corporation in 2010. But, the proposal was rejected due to the resolution passed by the Thoothukudi City Municipal Council against this. It was later observed that, this decision had disastrous consequences in the development of sub-urban areas of Thoothukudi. Mappillaiyoorani panchayat was the worstly affected area during the 2023 December Floods.The local civic body of Mappillaiurani panchayat cripples badly continuously without sufficient funds at par with urban areas and tax income from its residents and industries. While the 14 wards under this panchayat has differential needs like proper Street management which includes removal of ramps and encroachments, laying of quality roads, parks, Bus terminus at Thalamuthu Nagar and bus stops, solid and liquid waste management, Expansion of Underground Drainage Scheme from Thoothukudi corporation, regular water supply, many of the demands remain unaddressed. This sets a classic example of how irresponsible decision of persons in power can bring catastrophic consequences in urban spatial planning and haphazard agglomeration without sustainable management. This area lacks basic infrastructure, proper planning and storm water drainage network.

People of this panchayat have been continuously demanding to merge this area with Thoothukudi Corporation. Yet, the government is silent.
