= S. M. Abdul Jabbar =

Indian writer (1939–2020)

Sathankulam. M. Abdul Jabbar
- Born: M. Abdul Jabbar; 26 June 1939; Sathankulam, Tamil Nadu, British Raj
- Died: 22 December 2020 (aged 81)
- Occupations: Media personality, writer
- Writing career
- Language: Tamil
- Period: 1951–2020
- Subjects: Literature, philosophy, religion, sports

S. M. Abdul Jabbar (26 June 1939 – 22 December 2020) was a Tamil radio broadcaster, cricket commentator, writer and actor.

== Early life ==
S. M. Abdul Jabbar was born into a middle class Muslim family and grew up in the small town of Sathankulam, presently in Thoothukudi district in the state of Tamil Nadu, India. Having relatives in Sri Lanka, he relocated to Colombo for his higher studies at Zahira College, Colombo. After completing his education he moved back to India due to the tense political situation in Sri Lanka.

== Radio and cricket commentary ==
Born in the Golden Age of Radio, Jabbar became a regular radio listener during his childhood in India and Sri Lanka. He often wrote letters to radio stations about their programs. On one occasion, he wrote a letter to All India Radio that was critical of its Tamil language cricket commentary. The letter was read on air, and he was invited to show his skill by providing Tamil commentary of the Ranji Trophy match between Tamil Nadu and Kerala. The opportunity changed his life.

Abdul Jabbar already had considerable experience anchoring Tamil programs for the Sri Lanka Broadcasting Corporation when he joined the AIR Chennai Tamil commentary team in 1979. He learned substantially from commentating with Tamil radio pioneer and cricket writer V Ramamurthy. The AIR Tamil commentary team covered every test match and one day international played in Chennai, and many of the regional matches. Jabbar's commentary remained popular through the 1990s, with a fan base in Tamil Nadu and Sri Lanka that included LTTE supremo Velupillai Prabhakaran, whom he interviewed in 2002. The AIR Tamil commentary team was disbanded in 2004, after which Abdul Jabbar continued providing Tamil commentary for the television channels ESPN, Neo Sports, Sun TV and Zee.

== Death ==
Abdul Jabbar died on 22 December 2020 due to cardiac arrest. He was 81.
