= Tiruchendur taluk =

Tiruchendur taluk is a taluk of Thoothukudi district of the Indian state of Tamil Nadu. The headquarters of the taluk is the town of Tiruchendur.

== Demographics ==
According to the 2011 census, the taluk of Tiruchendur had a population of 308,892 with 151,137 males and 157,755 females. There were 1044 women for every 1000 men. The taluk had a literacy rate of 81.83. Child population in the age group below 6 was 15,709 Males and 15,095 Females.
