= Vilathikulam taluk =

Taluk of Thoothukudi, Tamil Nadu, India

Coordinates: 9.17°N 78.17°E

Vilathikulam taluk is a taluk of Thoothukudi district of the Indian state of Tamil Nadu. The headquarters of the taluk is the town of Vilathikulam.

== Demographics ==
According to the 2011 census, the taluk of Vilathikulam had a population of 140,199 with 69,847 males and 70,352 females. There were 1007 women for every 1000 men. The taluk had a literacy rate of 72.05. Child population in the age group below 6 was 6,644 Males and 6,387 Females.
