= Ettayapuram taluk =

Ettayapuram taluk is a taluk of Thoothukudi district of the Indian state of Tamil Nadu. The headquarters of the taluk is the town of Ettayapuram.

== Demographics ==
According to the 2011 census, the taluk of Ettayapuram had a population of 74,985 with 36,415 males and 38,570 females. There were 1059 women for every 1000 men. The taluk had a literacy rate of 70.27. Child population in the age group below 6 was 3,432 Males and 3,332 Females.
