= Manimuthar Dam =

Dam in Tamil Nadu, India

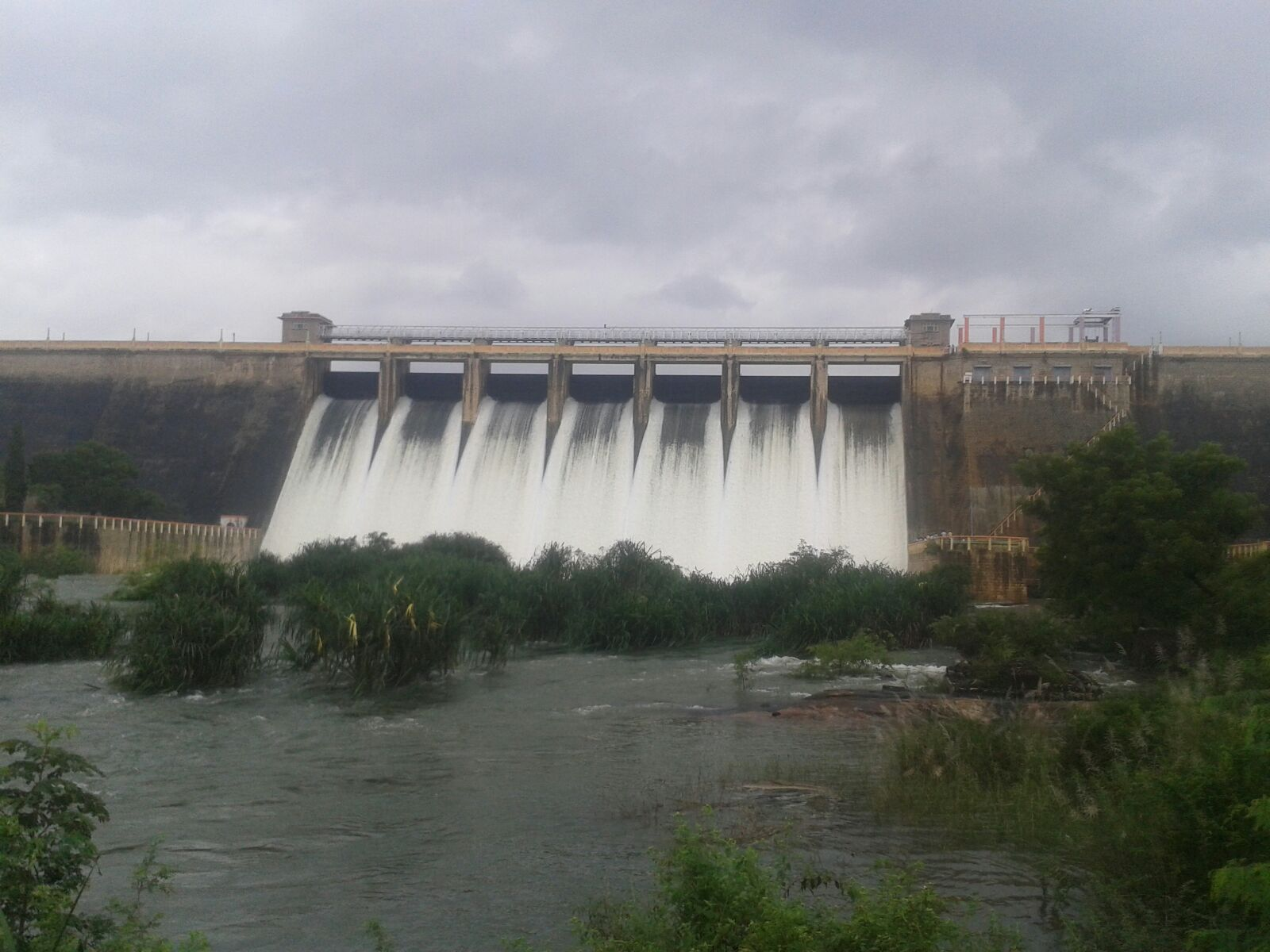

- Location of the Manimuthar Dam in Tamil Nadu
- Country: India
- Location: Manimutharu, Tirunelveli District, Tamil Nadu
- Coordinates: 8.653804°N 77.413418°E
- Purpose: Irrigation
- Opening date: 1958

Dam and spillways
- Type of dam: Gravity dam
- Height: 118 ft (36 m)
- Height (foundation): 150 ft (46 m)
- Length: 9,268 ft (2,825 m)
- Spillways: 7
- Spillway type: Chute

Reservoir
- Creates: Manimuthar reservoir
- Total capacity: 5.51×10^{9} cu ft (126,492 acre⋅ft)

The Manimuthar Dam is located in Manimutharu 50.8 kilometres (31.6 mi) away from Tirunelveli in Tamil Nadu, India. It is the biggest reservoir of the Tirunelveli district. This dam was built in 1958 near Singampatti and Kallidaikurichi, by the then Tamil Nadu Chief Minister K. Kamaraj, and K T Kosalram MP to prevent the drainage of surplus rainwaters with the Bay of Bengal during the rainy season. It can hold water up to 118 feet. The dam's storage capacity is 5,511 million cubic feet (5.5 Tmcft). The total length of the dam is 3 km It irrigated around 65,000 acres of areas in the northern part of the Nanguneri Taluk and Thisayanvilai and southern Veeravanallur, Karispalpatti, which are not irrigated by Pachaiyaaru in Tirunelveli district. The downstream joins River Thamirabarani in Kallidaikurichi after 6 km of its journey.
