= Oothu, Tirunelveli =

- village
- Oothu, Tirunelveli, Tamil Nadu
- Coordinates: 8.5770°N 77.3418°E
- Country: India
- State: Tamil Nadu
- District: Tirunelveli
- Elevation: 1,307.8 m (4,291 ft)

Languages
  - Official: Tamil
  - Speech: Tamil
- Time zone: UTC+5:30 (IST)
- PIN: 627427
- Other towns: Manjolai, Singampatti, Manimutharu, Ambasamudram, Kallidaikurichi

Oothunear Manjolai is a tribal village and hill station in kalakkad mundanthurai tiger reserve in Tirunelveli of Tamil Nadu state in peninsular India. Oothu is one of the viewpoints of Upper Kodaiyar , it's located within the manjolai hill station. It is a vibrant town sourouded by the Oothu tea estate, operated by the Bombay burmah group. The tea estates have been shut down by the Tamil Nadu government and you can't visit without prior permission . They are letting the native plants grown and turning the area back into a forest the tribal residents are still there.

== Location ==
Oothu is located at an altitude of about 1,307.8 metres (4,291 ft) above the mean sea level with the geographic coordinates of (8.5770°N 77.3418°E) in Tirunelveli.

Oothu, Tirunelveli (Tamil Nadu)

== Details ==
Oothu is one of the areas that was affected by December 2023 floods. It is also one of the rainfall recording areas by Meteorological department.
