= Sathankulam block =

Sathankulam block is a revenue block in the Thoothukudi district of Tamil Nadu, India. It has a total of 26 panchayat villages.
