= P. Rajagopal (businessman) =

Indian businessman and convicted Murderer (1947–2019)

Pitchai Rajagopal
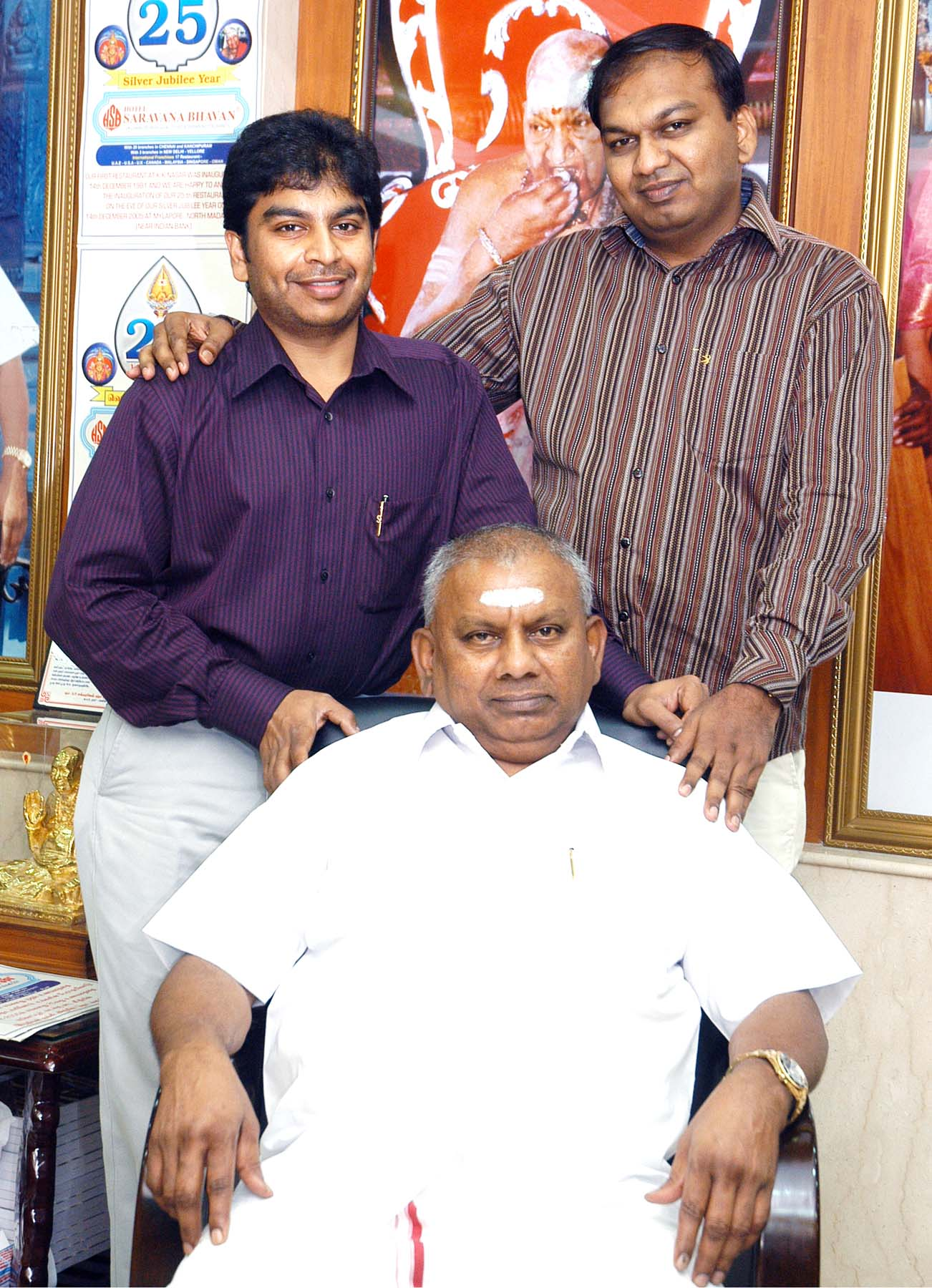
- Rajagopal with his sons in 2010
- Born: 5 August 1947; Punnaiyadi, Madras Presidency, British India
- Died: 18 July 2019 (aged 71); Chennai, India
- Known for: Founder of Saravana Bhavan, Murder of Santhakumar
- Criminal charges: Murder
- Criminal penalty: Life imprisonment
- Children: 2 sons

Pitchai Rajagopal (5 August 1947 – 18 July 2019) was a convicted murderer, and founder of the Saravana Bhavan chain of restaurants based in Chennai, India. Born in rural Tamil Nadu into a farming family, and with little education, Rajagopal built a global restaurant chain.

In later life, he was convicted for a 2001 murder, and began serving a life sentence in July 2019. Several days after his imprisonment, he had a heart attack and died.

== Early life ==
Rajagopal was born in Punnaiyadi, a tiny village now in Tuticorin District, Tamil Nadu, India. His father was an onion seller, and his mother was a homemaker.

== Business ==
In 1973, he moved to Madras and started a general provisions store in K K Nagar. He opened his first restaurant in 1981. By 2019, he had expanded to 111 restaurants in 22 countries, employing about 5,000 people. He built a temple in his village called Punnai Sri Srinivasaperumal Kovil.

== Murder of Santhakumar ==
On the advice of an astrologer, he obsessively tried to take Jeevajothi, the daughter of one of his assistant managers, as his third wife, but she was already married and rejected him. He orchestrated multiple threats, beatings, and exorcisms against her and her family. In 2001, after one attempted murder, he successfully orchestrated the murder of her husband, Prince Santhakumar. Santhakumar was kidnapped and his body was found strangled a few days later in a resort town in the Western Ghats mountain range.

=== Life sentence for murder ===
In 2004, a Chennai court sentenced Rajagopal to 10 years in prison for the murder of Santhakumar. Upon appeal, the Madras High Court upgraded his prison term to a life sentence, upholding the lower court's conviction.

Rajagopal was freed on bail for medical reasons while his case was appealed to the Indian Supreme Court. On 29 March 2019, the Supreme Court of India upheld Rajagopal's murder conviction and life imprisonment. He was ordered to surrender to the authorities by 7 July 2019, which he did on 9 July 2019. The Supreme Court rejected his request for a bail extension on medical grounds as well as his request that his hospitalization be counted towards his prison sentence.

== Death ==
A heart attack struck Rajagopal on 13 July 2019 after he surrendered to serve his life sentence on 9 July 2019. After transferring from Stanley Medical College Hospital to Vijaya Hospital in Chennai, he died of another heart attack on 18 July 2019.
