= V. Pudur =

- Panchayat town
- Nickname: pudur
- Location in Tamil Nadu, India
- Coordinates: 9.29°N 78.14°E
- Country: India
- State: Tamil Nadu
- District: Thoothukudi

Population (2001)
  - Total: 8,037

Languages
  - Official: Tamil
- Time zone: UTC+5:30 (IST)
- PIN: 628905
- Telephone code: 04638
- Vehicle registration: TN69 New TN96

V. Pudur (Vilathikulam Pudur) is a panchayat town in Thoothukudi district in the Indian state of Tamil Nadu.

== Demographics ==
As of 2001 India census, V. Pudur had a population of 8037. Males constitute 50% of the population and females 50%. V. Pudur has an average literacy rate of 69%, higher than the national average of 59.5%: male literacy is 78%, and female literacy is 59%. In V. Pudur, 11% of the population is under 6 years of age.

== Economy ==
Pudur serves as town for the nearby villages and fulfills the needs of the people such as Education, Medical and Agricultural Business. "Census of India 2011 – Village and Town Directory, Tamil Nadu". Office of the Registrar General & Census Commissioner, India. The Economy of this area is primarily based on agriculture and allied activities, as reflected in district-level economic classifications. Some popular match industries such as the Century Match Factory in Pudur and the two spinning mills(JAGATHAMBIKA AND VIJAYALAKSHMI) Own by jayavilass Group, situated near Pudur provides employment opportunities for a sound number of people living here. Industrial Profile of Thoothukudi District (Report). Micro, Small and Medium Enterprises Development Institute (MSME), Government of India. 2018.

Commercial activities in the town is concentrated along major roads such as Anna Salai, Kadalkudi Road and Gandhi Bazaar. .District Survey Report – Thoothukudi. Department of Geology and Mining, Government of Tamil Nadu. 2020. Out of these Anna Salai that runs through the town enclose most of the shops and commercial complexes Such as Alagammal Super Market. Kadalkudi road situated in the east of the town is developing since 2000 that too holds a large number commercial buildings. Gandhi Bazaar was once a popular and busy business area but since the past few years most of the shops were evacuated and moved to Anna Salai and Kadalkudi Road.

== Medical Facilities ==
This town has good Govt. Primary Health Center situated in the Vilathukulam road that serves for poor and needy people. Also there are private Doctors in this town Dr. sathrapathy MBBS, Dr. Thirumal Murugan, Dr.A.Jeyalakshmi Lingaiah D.H.M.S., Dr. Suba Barathi BDS, are well known for their service.

== Agriculture ==
This is a manavari land (land depending on rain). Farmers cultivate their land in rainy season only. Dry Chilly is one of the major agricultural product grown in this region. Kambu, Cholam are also cultivated in large area.

== Transport ==
Pudhur lies on the Arupukottai - Vilathikulam main road and hence served by frequent bus services. The major Towns situated nearby Pudur are Vilathikulam (19 km), Arupukottai (22 km), Sattur (28 km), Kovilpatti (45 km) and Madurai (75 km).

There are direct and frequent bus services from Pudur to Kovilpatti, Thoothukudi, Aruppukottai and Sattur.

Private cabs (Mini bus, Van and Cars) are also available.

== Financial ==
There are well established banks in this town which are the:

- Tamil Nadu State Co-Operative Bank
- Pandian Grama Bank
- Thoothukudi District Co-operative bank
- Tamil Nadu Mercantile Bank (TMB)

An ATM is operated by TMB and the ATM is available in the bank premises in the Anna Salai.

== Entertainment ==
Until a few years ago there were two talkies at pudur named Seetharamu in the Arupukkottai Road and Rathna in the Vadakkunatham road. Both of these theatres were the entertainment spots to the people in pudur and near by villages for more than 2 decades. Both of them were closed and demolished now due to less public interest.

== Education ==
Education is not a burden for the children of Pudur. Well established schools are there in Pudur to educate children. Service is done by

- Govt Higher Secondary School
- Hindu Nadar High School
- Panchayat Union Middle School
- T.D.T.A Primary School
- Sri Krishna Nursery and Primary School
- Government School Kumarachithanpatti
- Mahathma Matriculation School

Also Maharajapuram Seeni Matriculation School at Nagalapuram (the nearby village) Serves with English Medium of Learning.

== Politics ==
Pudur Comes under the Assembly constituency of Vilathikulam and LokSabha constituency of Thoothukudi. Formerly it was in Thirunelveli LokSabha constituency.

Pudur is basically a calm town where there is no communal violence or other major crimes registered in the past 30 years.
