= P. Sri Acharya =

- Born: Pichu Srinivasacharya; 16 April 1886; Thenthiruperai, Thoothukudi District, Tamil Nadu, India
- Died: 28 October 1981 (aged 95)
- Occupations: Journalist, Writer, Scholar
- Known for: Independence Activist
- Parent(s): Pichu Iyengar, Pichu Ammal
- Awards: Sahitya Akademi Award (1965)

Pichu Iyengar Sri Acharya (16 April 1886 – 28 October 1981) was a Sahitya Akademi Award winning Tamil scholar, journalist and writer from Tamil Nadu, India.

== Biography ==
Acharya was born in Thenthiruperai, Thoothukudi District in 1886 to Pichu Iyengar and Pichu Ammal. His full birth name was P. Srinivasacharya, which was later shortened to P. Sri Acharya and further to P. Sri. He was educated at MDT Hindu College, Tirunelveli. He was a friend of the nationalist poet Subramania Bharathi and under his influence become an independence activist. At the insistence of C. Rajagopalachari he started reading Tamil literature and it soon became his primary field of expertise. He also published a journal titled Grama Paribalanam (lit. Administration of Villages) briefly. Later he worked as a journalist for the journal Kumaran. At Kalki Krishnamurthy's invitation he joined Ananda Vikatan. He ended his journalistic career as the editor of Dina Mani. In 1965, he was awarded the Sahitya Akademi Award for Tamil for his biography of Ramanuja. He died in 1981.

== Bibliography ==
=== Alliance Publishers ===
- Arupadai Veedugal (6 Volumes)
- Azhwargal Varalaaru (8 Volumes)
- Divya Prabandha Saaram
- Aruna Girinadhar
- Kandhapurana Kadhaigal
- Naradhar
- Navarathiri Kadhaigal
- Rajarishi Viswamithrar
- Thayumanavar
- Dasavathara Kadhaigal
- Thulli Thirindha Kalathilae
- Avvaiyar
- Moonru Deepangal

=== Kannadasan Publishers ===
(Critical Commentaries)

- Ramanum Muruganum
- Manikkavasagarum Nammazhvarum
- Kabirdasarum Thayumanavarum
- Gandhiyum Leninum
- Gandhiyum Vinobavum
- Andalum Meeravum
- Bharathiyum Tagorum
- Valluvarum Socratesum
- Nandanarum Thirupaanalwarum
- Bharathi: Naan Kandathum Kettadhum

=== Kalaimagal Kariyalayam ===
- Anbu Vazhartha Arivu Payir - Azhwargalum Acharyargalum
- Paadum Bhaktha Manigal (9 Volumes)
- Moovar Erriya Mozhivilakku
- Thonda Kulamae thozhu kulam
- Thuyil Ezhuppiya Thondar
- Adi Soodiya Arasu
- Bhagawanai Valartha Bhakthar

=== Unknown publisher ===
- Thiruppavai
- Thiruvembavai
- Kuzhandhai Valarppu Murai
- Sivanesa Selvar
- Thamizh valarndha Kadhai
- Sri Ramanujar 1964, Sudhesamitran Publishers, Madras.

== See also ==
- List of Sahitya Akademi Award winners for Tamil
- List of Indian writers
- List of Tamil-language writers
