= Kanam, Tamil Nadu =

Kanam
- Panchayat town
- Location in Tamil Nadu, India
- Coordinates: 8.545886°N 78.061964°E
- Country: India
- State: Tamil Nadu
- District: Thoothukudi

Area
  - Total: 4.68 km^{2} (1.81 sq mi)

Population (2011)
  - Total: 3,134
  - Density: 670/km^{2} (1,730/sq mi)

Languages
  - Official: Tamil
- Time zone: UTC+5:30 (IST)
- PIN: 628201
- Telephone code: 04639
- Vehicle registration: TN 69, TN 92

Kanam is a panchayat town in Thoothukudi district in the Indian state of Tamil Nadu.

== Demographics ==
As of 2011 India census, Kanam had a population of 3,134. Males constitute 47.4% of the population and females 52.5%. Kanam has an average literacy rate of 85.05 %, higher than the state average 80.09 % male literacy is 90.25%, and female literacy is 80.40 %. In Kanam, 9.29% of the population is under 6 years of age.

== Landmark ==
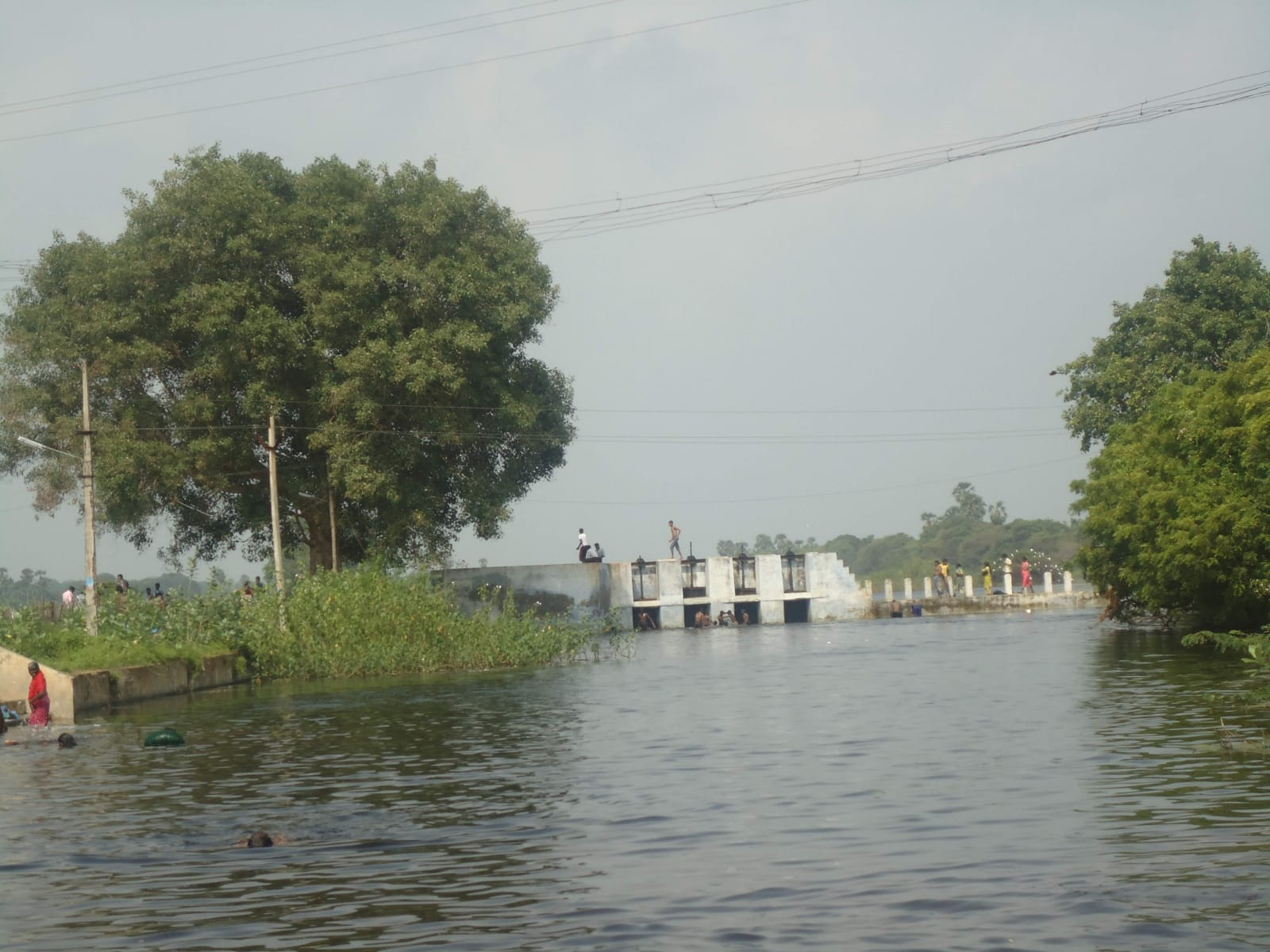

One of the most important place here is the Kanam sluice (மடை), where the local people around the village enjoy fishing, bathing, washing.

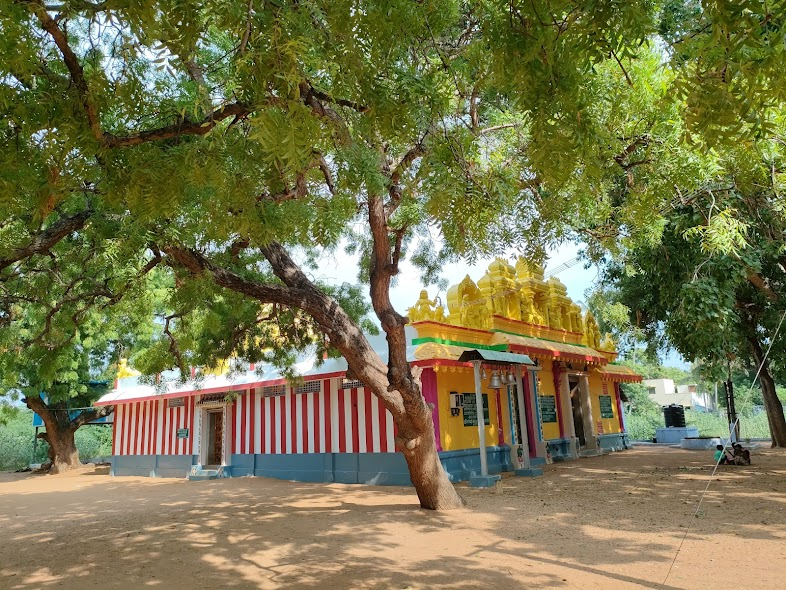

One famous temple, Parvathi amman temple of Vallivilai village, administratively comes under Kanam town.
