= Thoothukudi taluk =

Thoothukudi taluk is a taluk of Thoothukudi district of the Indian state of Tamil Nadu. The headquarters of the taluk is the town of Thoothukudi.

== Demographics ==
According to the 2011 census, the taluk of Thoothukkudi had a population of 476,890 with 238,533 males and 238,357 females. There were 999 women for every 1,000 men. The taluk had a literacy rate of 81.9%. Child population in the age group below 6 years were 25,329 Males and 24,692 Females.
