= Kalugasalapuram =

Kalugasalapuram also known as Kammavar Kottai, is a medium populated village of nayakkar caste (KAMMA) people near kovilpatti in Thoothukudi district in the Indian state of Tamil Nadu.

The village youngsters formed a group named "Krishnadevaraya Kammavar Ilaignar Sangam-22/2016" is famous around tamil nadu which is the backbone of the village. The primary source of income for this village inhabitants comes from agriculture and much of the agricultural land is dependent on the rain, although some of the rich have their own resource for the cultivation like wells, pumps etc.

It falls under Kayathar Union and the nearest town is Kovilpatti. Till 1982, the only means of commuting to this village was through the train which stopped at Kurumalai station from where the villagers used to take a rough path to reach their homes. Of late, buses do ply into the village and pass through Kadambur to make a profitable route for the operators.

This village is a typical example for India where despite inadequate infrastructure like roads, poor electricity, water shortage, a small number of professionals emerged and are doing well in places abroad such as the Middle East, Singapore, USA etc. after completing good education, which is a testimony to the potential of the village which remains only partially tapped. A lot of people are serving the government as top officials.
