= Srivaikuntam taluk =

Srivaikuntam Taluk is a taluk of Thoothukudi district of the Indian state of Tamil Nadu. The headquarters of the taluk is the town of Srivaikuntam.

== Demographics ==
According to the 2011 census, the taluk of Srivaikuntam had a population of 202,905 with 100,296 males and 102,609 females. There were 1023 women for every 1000 men. The taluk had a literacy rate of 76.91. Child population in the age group below 6 was 10,616 males and 10,232 females. Appanad Maravars are living in large numbers in this region along with Yadav in Mukkani, Velur, Karungulam and Nadars in cheraikulam, Athalikulam and Scheduled Caste . Appanad Maravar Villages are Velur Kasba, Velur Adichehanallur, Vallanadu, Tolappanpannai, Singathakurichi, Seydunganallur, Perur, Padmanabhamangalam, Nanalkadu, Muthulangurichi, Muruppanadukovilpattu, Mukkani, Manakkarai, Kongarayankurichi, Karungulam, Kalvay, Kaliyavur, Cherakulam, Alwarkarkulam, Alikkudi, Alanda, Agaram. Appanad Maravars use Pandian as their surname in this region. Tiruvaikuntam Taluka - Thoothukkudi

List of all towns and Villages in Srivaikuntam Taluka of Thoothukkudi district, Tamil Nadu. Complete details of Population, Religion, Literacy and Sex Ratio in tabular format.

1. Town State Population

1 Srivaikuntam Town Panchayat Tamil Nadu 15,847

2 Sayapuram Town Panchayat Tamil Nadu 12,792

3 Eral Town Panchayat Tamil Nadu 9,478

4 Perungulam Town Panchayat Tamil Nadu 7,203

1. Villages Administrative Division Population

1 Agaram 1,924

2 Alanda 2,513

3 Alikkudi 797

4 Alwarkarkulam 1,902

5 Aniyaparanallur 2,843

6 Arampannai 3,132

7 Arumugamangalam 1,189

8 Cherakulam 4,837

9 Chettimallanpatti 336

10 Deivaseyalpuram 819

11 Ellainayakkanpatti 1,682

12 Iruvappapuram 1,753

13 Kaliyavur 2,378

14 Kalvay 3,266

15 Karungulam 6,449

16 Kilavallanadu 1,165

17 Kilpidagai Kasba 1,074

18 Kilpidagai Varadarajapuram 1,318

19 KilpidagaiAppankovil 875

20 Kilputhaneri 1,516

21 Kodungani 27

22 Kongarayankurichi 3,246

23 Korkai 3,986

24 Kottarakkurichi 3,858

25 Manakkarai 3,474

26 Mangalakkurichi 1,248

27 Manjanirkayal 1,143

28 Maramangalam 3,819

29 Meenakshipuram Sekkarakkudi 1,186

30 Mukkani 6,851

31 Murappanadu Pudugramam 1,045

32 Muruppanadukovilpattu 1,566

33 Muthulangurichi 1,066

34 Nallathi 2,874

35 Nanalkadu 619

36 Padmanabhamangalam 2,398

37 Palayakkayal 5,024

38 Parakramapandi 1,597

39 Perur 1,419

40 Poovani 2,914

41 Sekkarakkudi 5,166

42 Seydunganallur 7,708

43 Singathakurichi 2,624

44 Siruthondanallur 4,495

45 Sivagalai 4,087

46 Srimulakkarai 4,363

47 Sriparankusanallur 1,477

48 Tannuthu 555

49 Terkukariseri 1,236

50 Tirupanichettikulam 795

51 Tiruppani Chettiyarpatti 229

52 Tirupuliyangudi 1,128

53 Tolappanpannai 1,611

54 Ulakkudi 759

55 Vadakkukariseri 1,189

56 Vadavallanadu 2,483

57 Valavallan 3,553

58 Vallakulam 3,313

59 Vallanadu 7,160

60 Vallanadu R.F. 4

61 Vasavappapuram 3,812

62 Velur Adichehanallur 1,422

63 Velur Kasba 2,923

64 Vitthalapuram 3,175

65 Vitthalapuram Kovilpattu 1,247
