= Saravanaa Bhavan =

Restaurant chain

- Formerly: Hotel Saravana Bhavan
- Type: Private
- Industry: Restaurant
- Genre: Southern Indian Cuisine
- Founded: 1981; 45 years ago
- Founder: P. Rajagopal
- Headquarters: Chennai, Tamil Nadu, India
- Number of locations: 33 branches in India, 92+ branches In 28 countries
- Area served: India, Singapore, Malaysia, Thailand, Hong Kong, Japan, South Korea, United Arab Emirates, Saudi Arabia, Oman, Qatar, Bahrain, Kuwait, South Africa, Ireland, France, Germany, Netherlands, Belgium, Sweden, Italy, Spain, Poland, Switzerland, United Kingdom, Canada, United States, Australia, and New Zealand.
- Products: Food, Sweets, Bakery, Ice cream
- Services: Fast Food, Take Away, Home Delivery and Outdoor Catering
- Revenue: ▲₹29,782.4 million (US$310 million) (2017)
- Number of employees: 8,700 (in India - 2023)
- Website: saravanabhavan.com (Global); saravanabhavan.co (India); saravanaabhavan.co.uk (UK); saravanaabhavan.us (US); saravanabhavan.ca (Canada); saravanaabhavan.com.au (Australia); saravanaabhavan.se (Sweden)

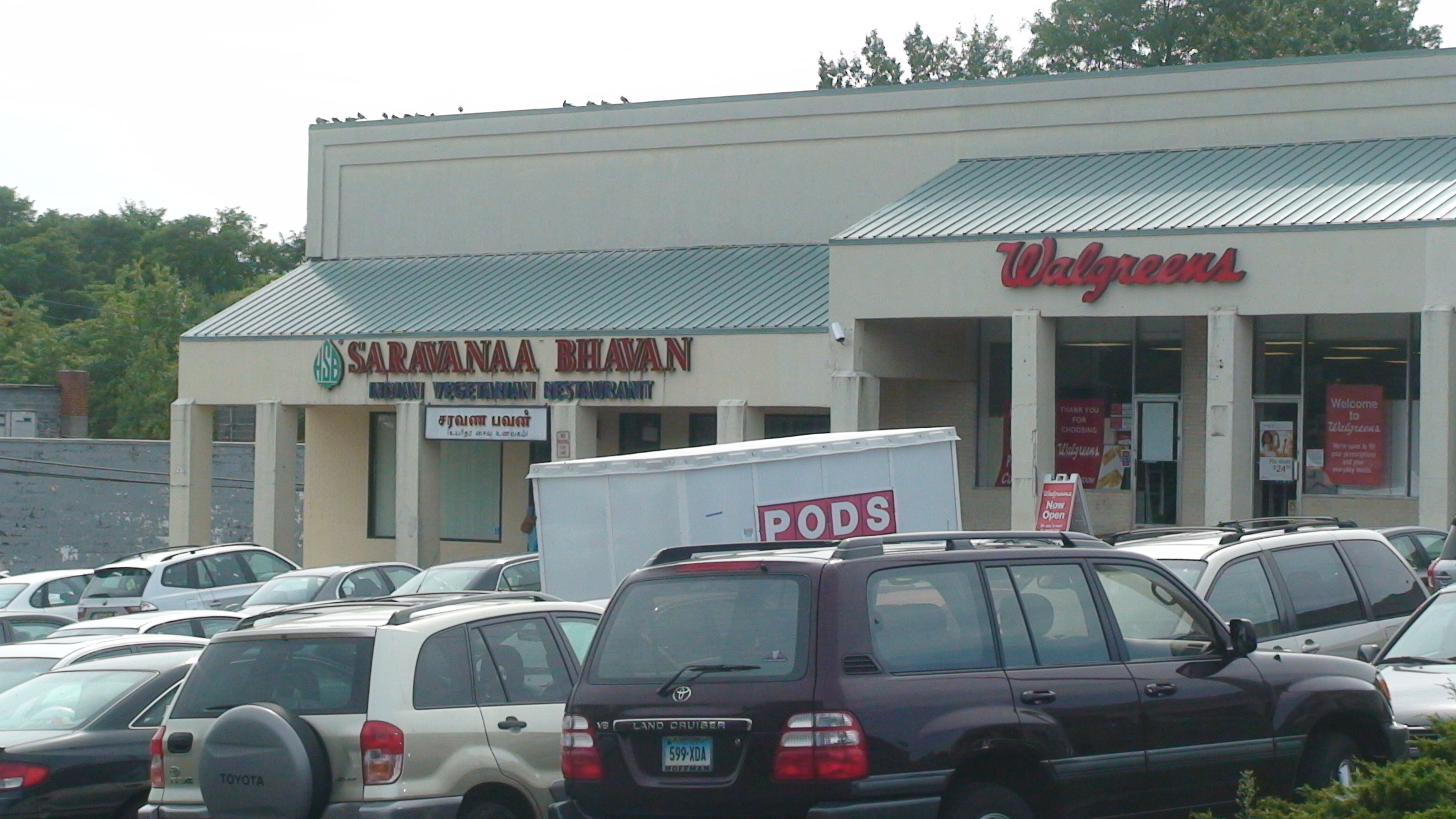
The Saravanaa Bhavan restaurant in Edison, New Jersey, U.S., near New York City, is the largest and busiest branch restaurant outside South India.

Saravanaa Bhavan, previously Hotel Saravana Bhavan, is an Indian restaurant chain based in Chennai, Tamil Nadu, India. The chain serves South Indian cuisine and operates 33 locations in India (24 in Chennai) and 92+ across 28 countries in North America, Asia, the Middle East, Europe, and Oceania.

== History ==
In 1968, P. Rajagopal opened a tiny grocery shop in K. K. Nagar, on the outskirts of Chennai. In 1981, he opened his first restaurant, which initially operated at a huge loss. However, his restaurant quickly became both popular and profitable.

While visiting Singapore in 1992, Rajagopal observed the functioning of multinational fast food restaurants like McDonald's. He used them as a model for his restaurant chains.

By the 1990s, Saravanaa Bhavan had opened multiple restaurant locations throughout Chennai. In 2000, Saravanaa Bhavan opened its first branch outside India, in Dubai, a city with a large number of Indian expatriates.

Currently, Saravanaa Bhavan has multiple overseas locations which are run by franchisees. While the restaurants have gained popularity among non-Indians, they mostly target the South Asian expatriate population. They have been referred to as "canteen-like joints strictly aimed at Indian expatriates missing a taste of home". To save on labor costs, Saravanaa Bhavan sends workers from India to work in their foreign branches.

== Legal Issues ==
In 2004, founder P. Rajagopal was found guilty of the murder of Prince Santhakumar, the husband of a woman who had rejected his marriage proposal.

In 2024, the Indian restaurant chain was alleged to exploit its staff worldwide – including in Germany. In a trial in Hamburg/Germany, even allegations of human trafficking were raised. The Hamburg Regional Court held a trial against two managing directors of the company who were subsequently charged on suspicion of human trafficking, breaching the Working Hours Act and misappropriation of wages.

== See also ==
- Udupi restaurants and hotels
- Vegetarian and Vegan Restaurants in Singapore
- List of vegetarian and vegan restaurants
- Indians in the New York City metropolitan area
