= Sathankulam =

- Town
- Location in Tamil Nadu, India
- Coordinates: 8.45°N 77.93°E
- Country: India
- State: Tamil Nadu
- District: Thoothukudi

Government
  - Type: Town Panchayat

Area
  - Total: 5.2 km^{2} (2.0 sq mi)
- Elevation: 19 m (62 ft)

Population (2011)
  - Total: 22,205
  - Density: 4,300/km^{2} (11,000/sq mi)

Languages
  - Official: Tamil
- Time zone: UTC+5:30 (IST)
- Postal code: 628704
- Vehicle registration: TN-92( TN-69 till Jun17,2015)

Sathankulam is a panchayat town in Thoothukudi district in the Indian state of Tamil Nadu.

== Geography ==
Sathankulam is located in the banks of the Karumeni river at 8.45°N 77.93°E. It has an average elevation of 19 m (62 ft).

== Demographics ==
Total area of Sathankulam town is 5.2 km^{2} . According to the census 2011 the town population is 22,205. population density is 4675/km^{2}. As per the Census of 2011, Sathankulam town had 65.16% Hindus, 32.01% Christians and 2.83% Muslims.

Religion Data - Census 2011 - Sathankulam town
Religion	Percent(%)
Hindu	65.16%
Christian	32.01%
Muslim	2.83%

== Politics ==
Sattankulam assembly constituency is part of Srivaikuntam Assembly constituency & connected with Thoothukudi Lok Sabha constituency.

== Notable people ==
- S. M. Abdul Jabbar, radio broadcaster, cricket commentator, writer, actor
- N. Periasamy Former MLA of Tuticorin Constituency and Former DMK District Secretary
- S. P. Sarguna Pandian, Ex.Tamil Nadu Minister, Ex.Deputy General secretary of DMK
- Sasikala Pushpa, Former Tuticorin corporation Mayor, Former Rajya Sabha MP, Deputy State Leader of BJP Tamil Nadu

== See also ==
- Periyathalai
