= Kallamparai =

Kezhakallamparai
- village
- Nickname: Kallai (கல்லை)
- Location in Tamil Nadu, India Kezhakallamparai (India)
- Coordinates: 8°36′N 78°01′E
- Country: India
- State: Tamil Nadu
- District: Tuticorin

Languages
  - Official: Tamil
- Time zone: UTC+5:30 (IST)
- PIN: 628 623
- Nearest city: Tuticorin
- Lok Sabha constituency: Tuticorin
- Vidhan Sabha constituency: Tiruchendur
- Website: www.kallaijmsc.com

Kallamparai is a small village located in the Tuticorin district of Tamil Nadu, India. It is about 15 kilometres (9.3 mi) west of Tiruchendur and 35 kilometres (22 mi) east of Tirunelveli.

Kallamparai is home to about 120 families, whose main occupation is agriculture.
