= Manimutharu =

- Panchayat town
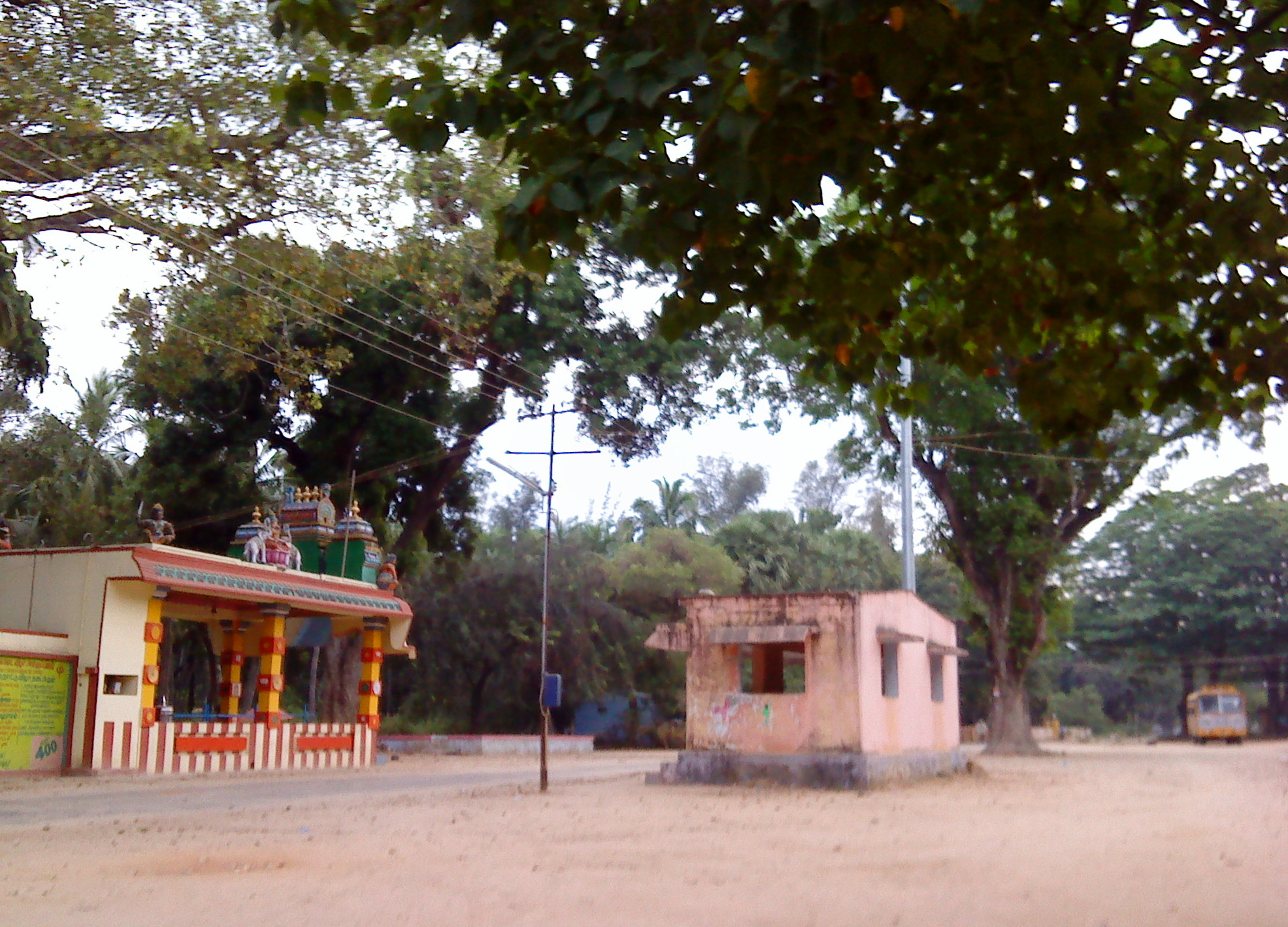
- Manimutharu bus stop

- Location in Tamil Nadu, India
- Coordinates: 8°40′57″N 77°23′15″E
- Country: India
- State: Tamil Nadu
- District: Tirunelveli
- Founder: AMBER

Population (2020)
  - Total: 80,000

Languages
  - Official: Tamil
- Time zone: UTC+5:30 (IST)
- PIN: 627421

Manimutharu is a panchayat town in Tirunelveli district in the Indian state of Tamil Nadu.

== Demographics ==
According to the 2001 Indian census, Manimutharu had a population of 50,000. The female/male ratio was 2:1. Manimutharu had an average literacy rate of 74%, higher than the national average of 59.5%. The literacy rate was equal between males and females. In Manimutharu, 11% of the population was under 6 years of age.

== Villages ==
- Chettimedu
- Aladiyoor
- Ayan Singampatti
- Cash Keeper Thoppu
- Adivaram (Mill Gate)
- Mela Ermalpuram
- Jamin Singampatti
- Korayarkulam
- Manimutharu
- Manjolai (Tea Estate)
- Thirupathiyapuram
- Vempaiyapuram
- Kudhira Mukku
- keela Earmalpuram

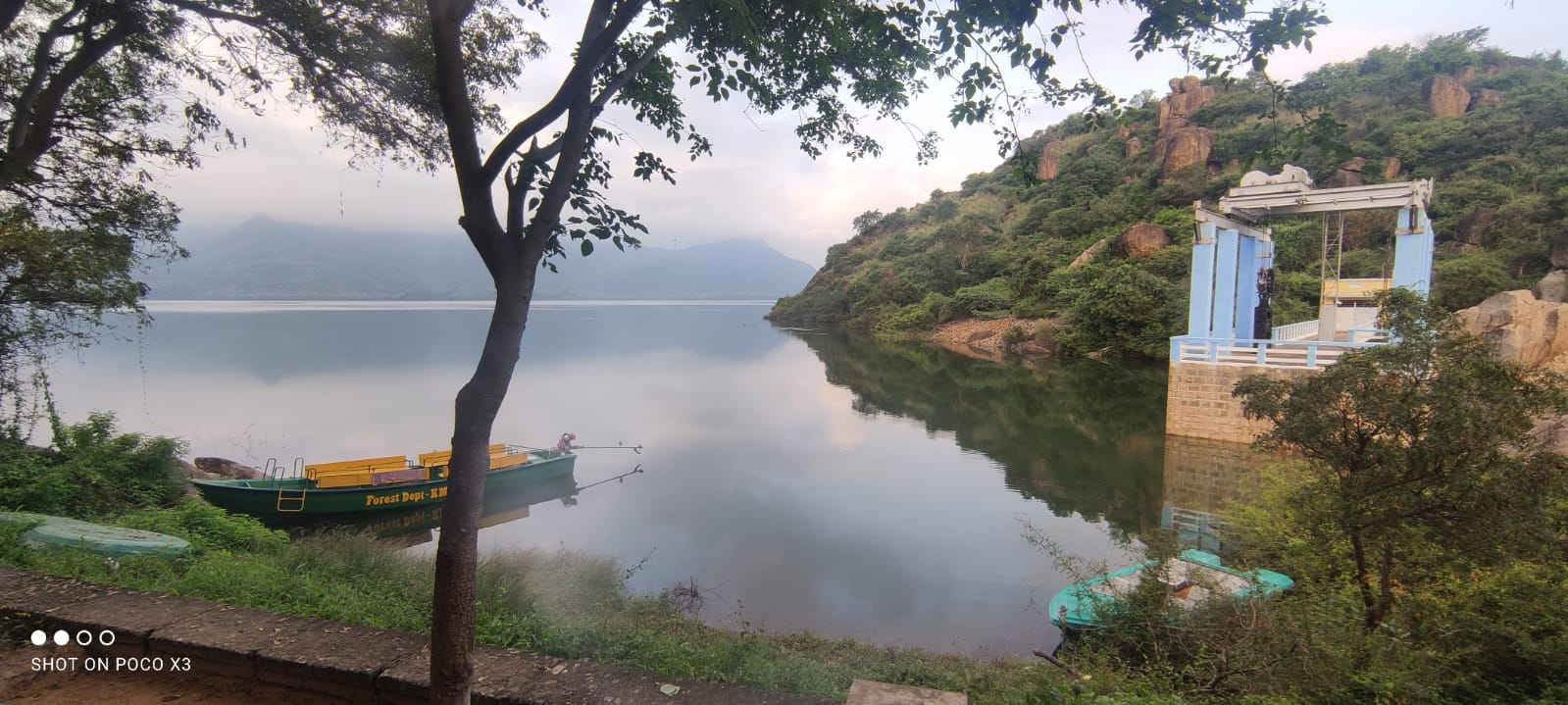
Manimutharu Dam

== Manjolai Hills ==
With elevations ranging from 1,020–1,500 metres (3,350–4,920 ft), the Manjolai area is set deep in the Western Ghats within the Kalakkad Mundanthurai Tiger Reserve in Tirunelveli District. Located on top of the Manimuthar Dam and the Manimuthar waterfalls, the Manjolai area comprises tea plantations and small settlements around them, Upper Kodaiyar Dam and a windy viewpoint called Kuthiravetti.

The tea plantations and the whole of Manjolai estates are operated by the Bombay Burmah Trading Corporation on forest lands leased from the government of Tamil Nadu. The three tea estates within the Manjolai area are Manjolai Estate, Manimutharu Estate and Oothu Estate. The estates are at elevations between 2300 feet and 4200 feet.

== Schools ==
- Saraswathi Isac Primary School, Thirupathiyapuram
- Rich Matriculation Higher Secondary School, Chettimedu
- Ganthi Primary School, Chettimedu
- Government Middle School, Aladiyoor
- Avvaiyar Elementary School, Mela Earmalpuram.
- Manimutharu Higher Secondary School, Manimuthar
- Murugathsa Elementary School, Keela Earmalpuram
