= Thoothukudi district =

Thoothukkudi district
- District of Tamil Nadu
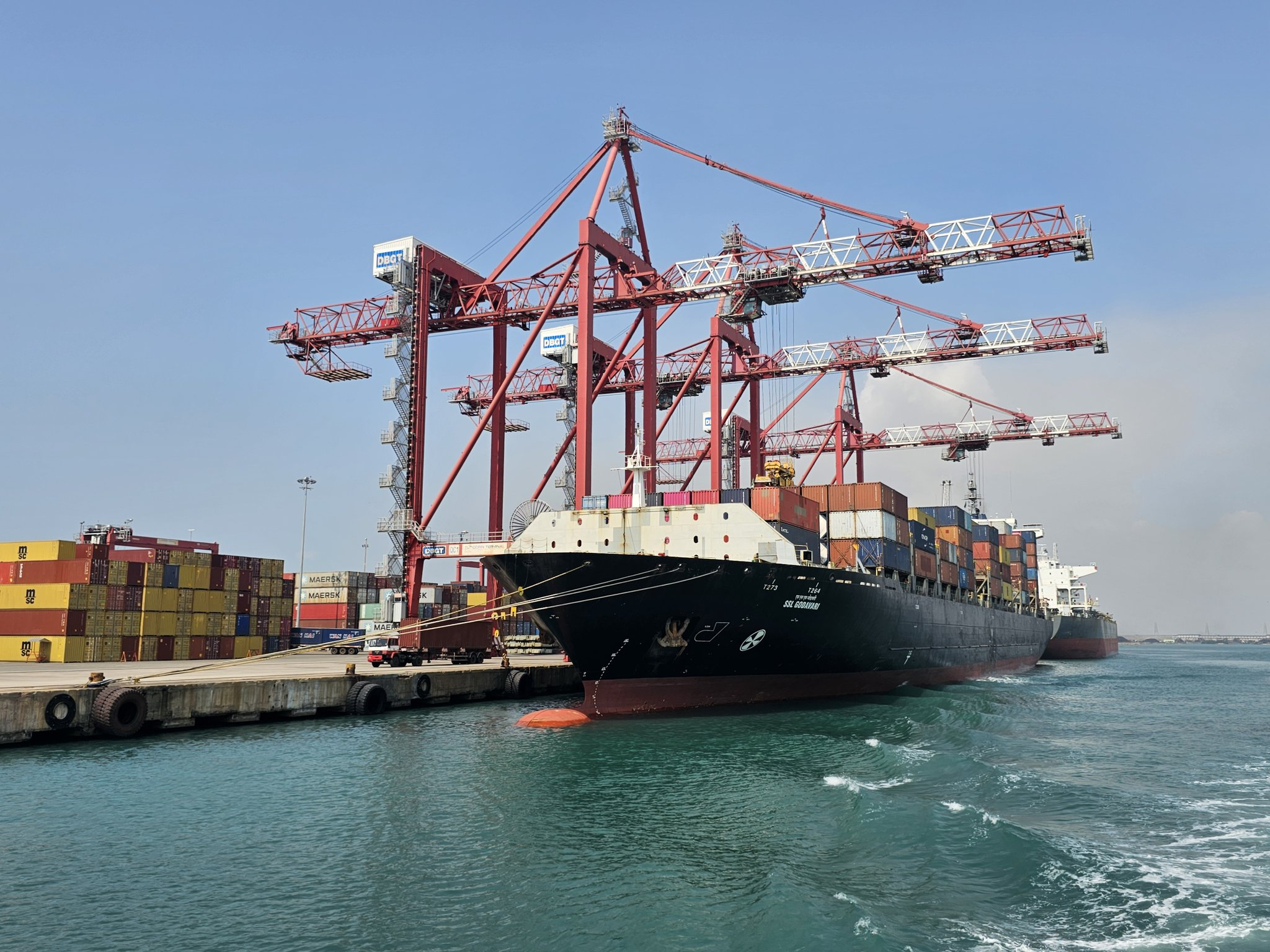
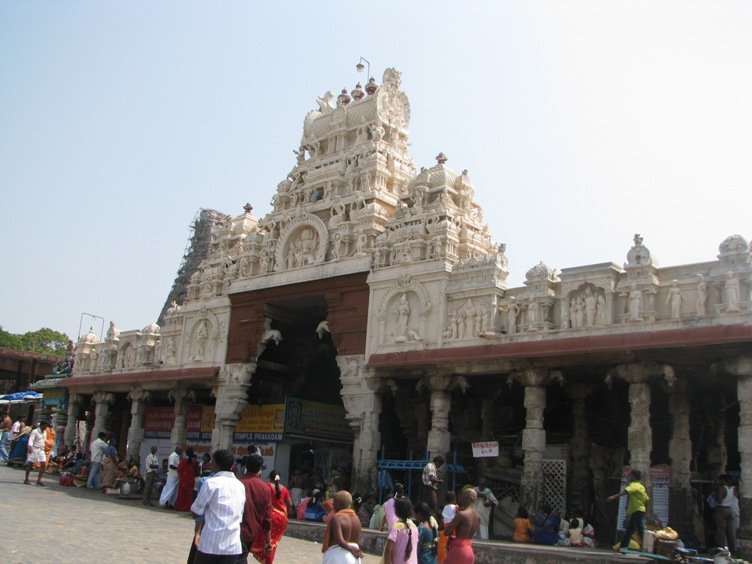
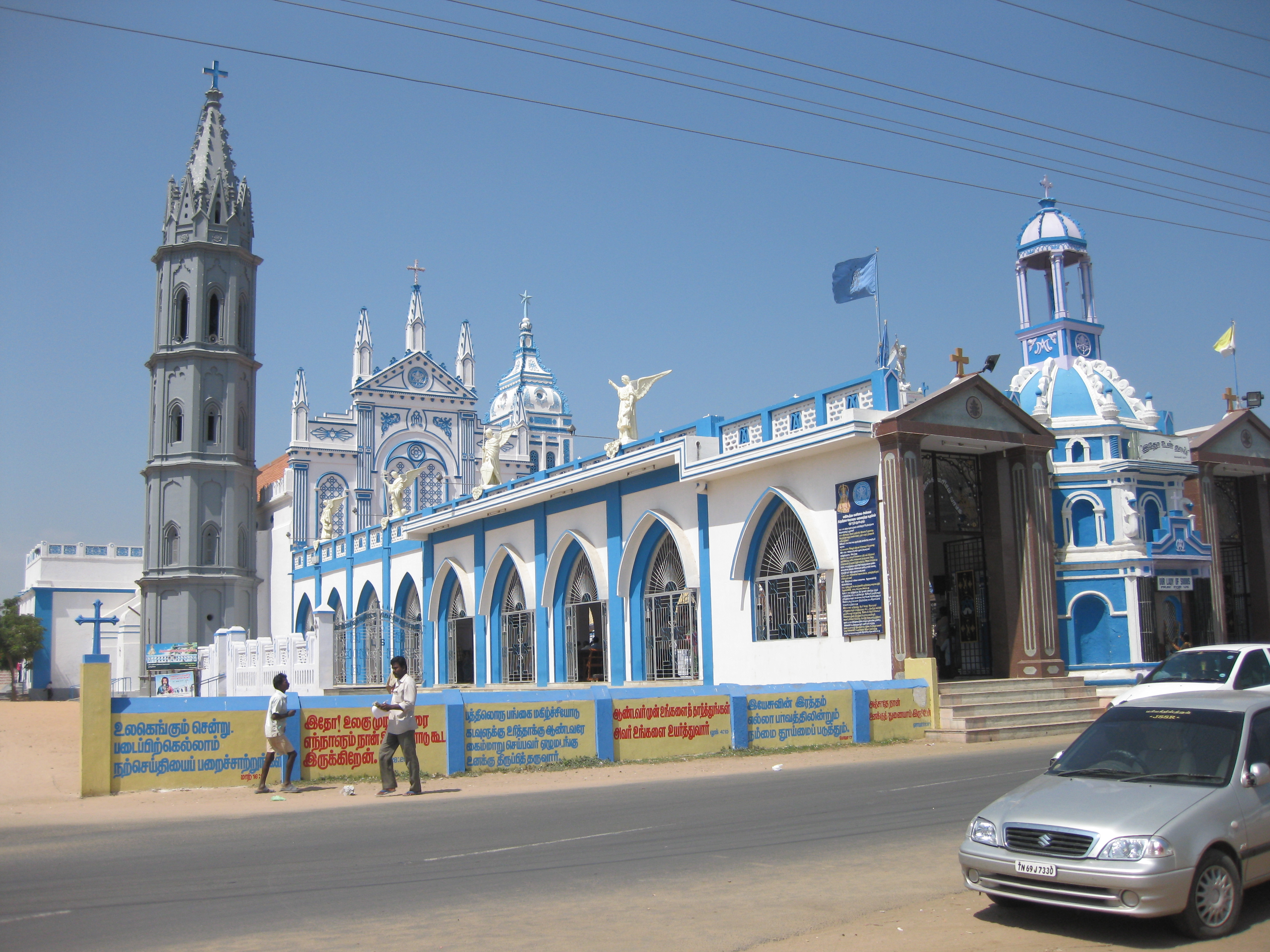
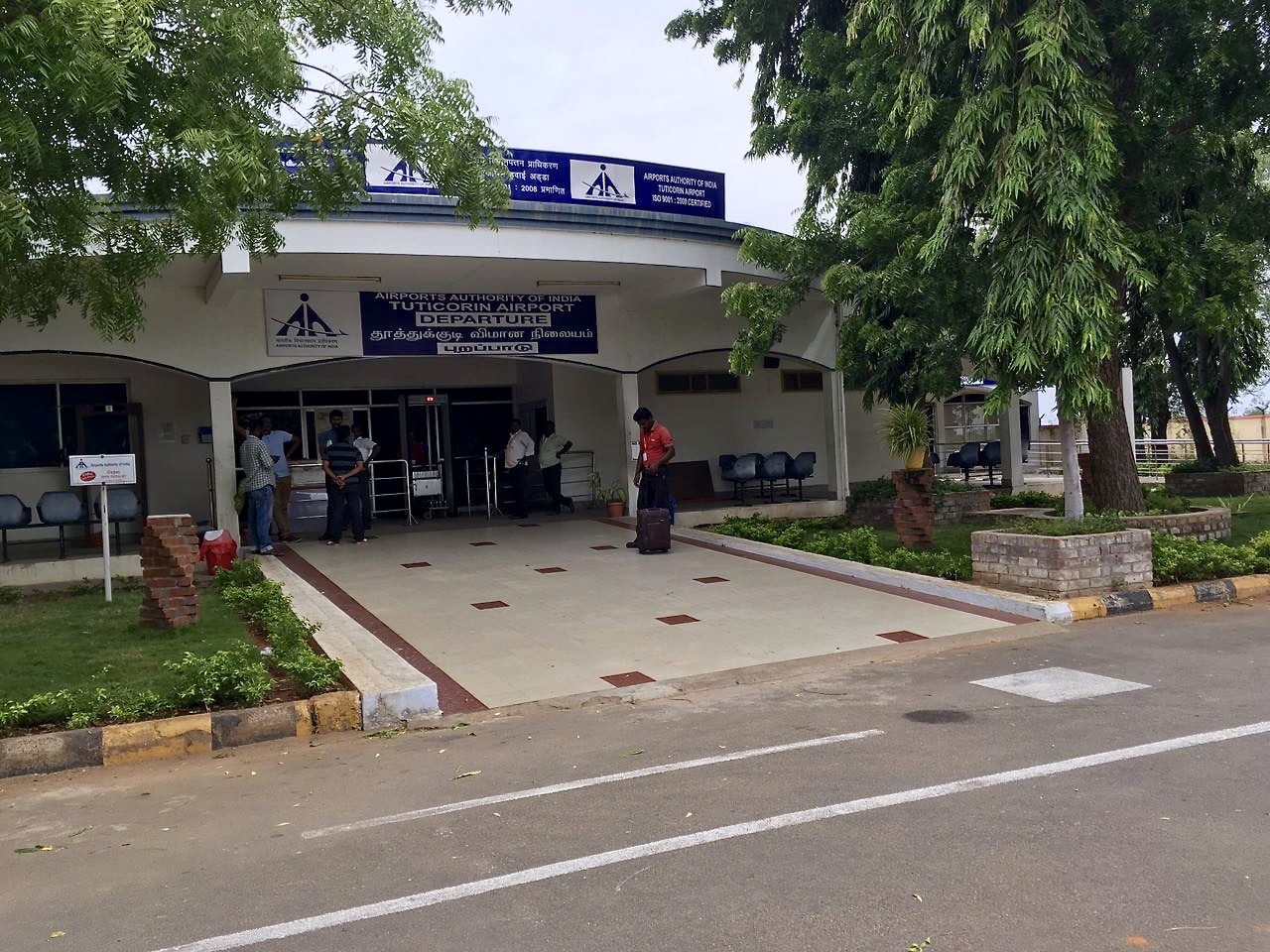
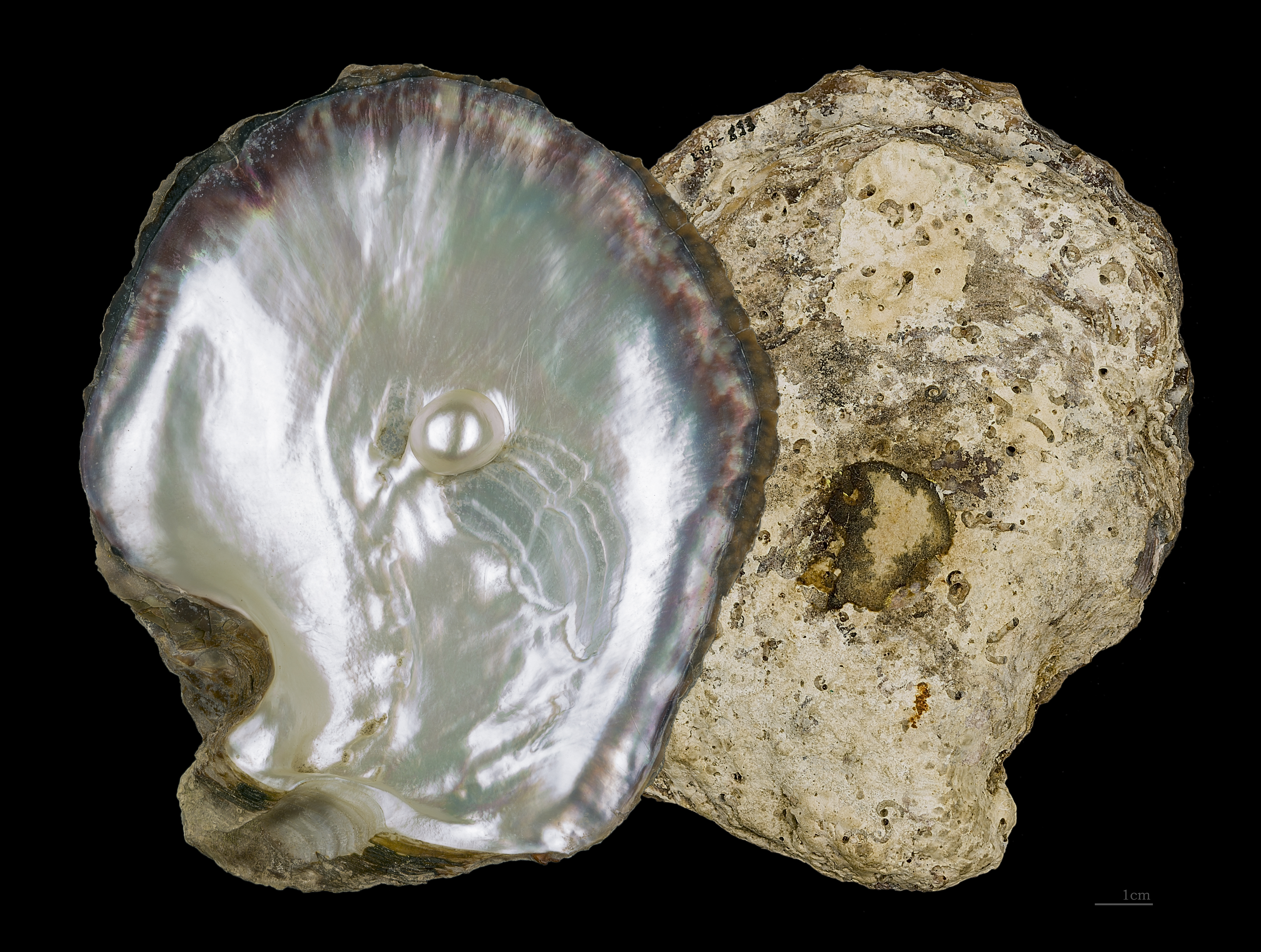
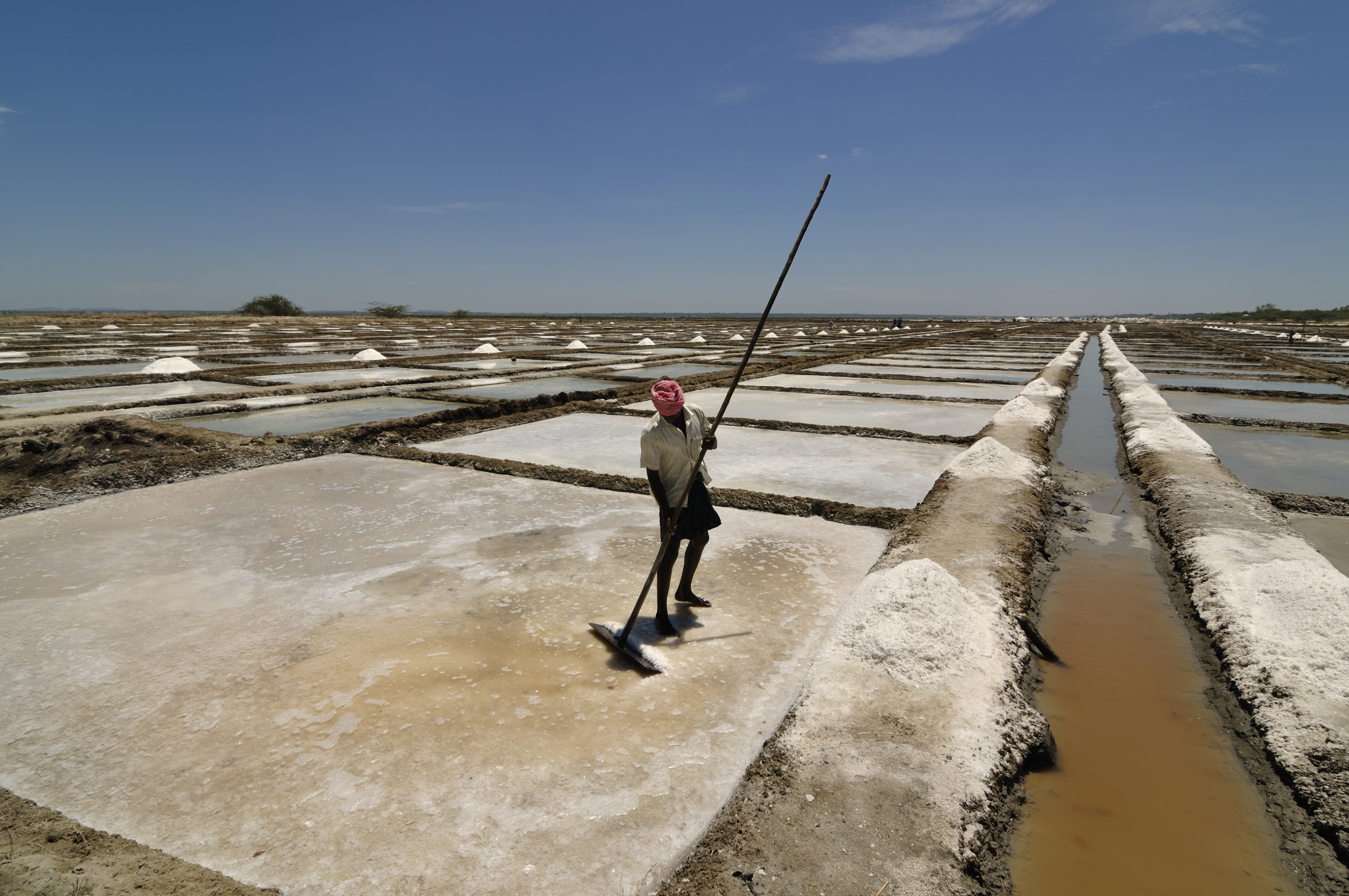
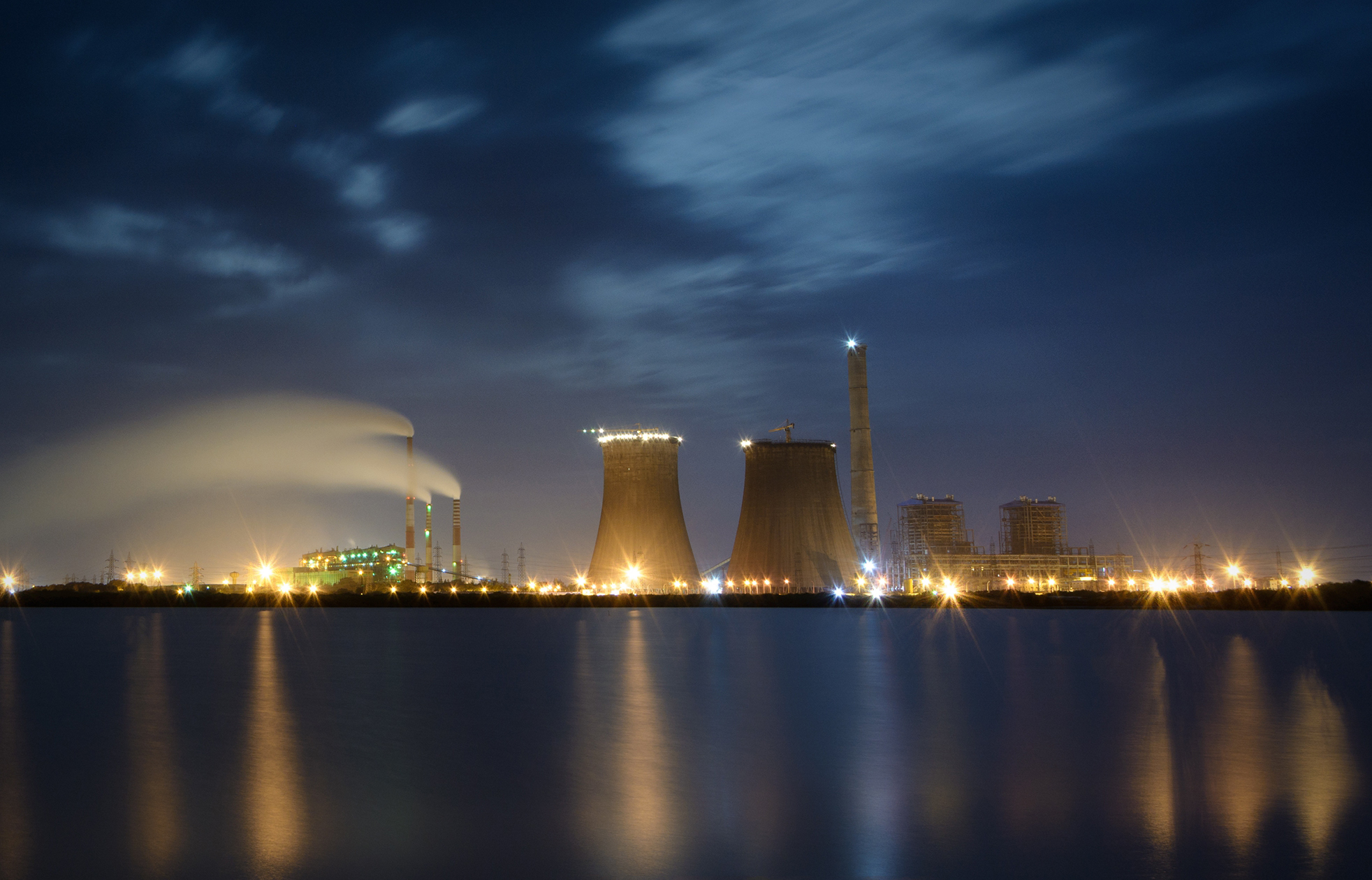
- Clockwise from the top V.O. Chidambaranar Port Authority, Basilica of Our Lady of Snows, Pearl Oyster of Pearl City, Thoothukkudi Thermal Power Station, Salt Pans in Thoothukkudi, Thoothukudi Airport, and Tiruchendur Subramania Swamy Temple
- Thoothukkudi district Location in Tamil Nadu
- Coordinates: 8°54′N 77°59′E
- Country: India
- State: Tamil Nadu
- Established: 20 October 1986; 40 years ago
- Founder: M. G. Ramachandran
- Headquarters: Thoothukkudi
- Talukas: Thoothukkudi, Srivaikuntam, Tiruchendur, Sathankulam, Eral, Kovilpatti, Ettayapuram, Vilathikulam, Ottapidaram, and Kayathar

Government
  - Type: District Administration
  - Body: Thoothukudi District Collectorate
  - District Collector: Vishu Mahajan, I.A.S.
  - Superintendent of Police: Abhishek Gupta, I.P.S.
  - District Revenue Officer: M. Guruchandran
  - Additional Collector and Project Director (DRDA): R. Ishwarya, I.A.S.

Area
  - Total: 4,707 km^{2} (1,817 sq mi)
  - Rank: 8

Population (2011)
  - Total: 1,750,176
  - Rank: 18
  - Density: 372/km^{2} (960/sq mi)

Languages
  - Official: Tamil
- Time zone: UTC+5:30 (IST)
- PIN: 628xxx
- Telephone code: 0461
- ISO 3166 code: ISO 3166-2:IN-TN
- Vehicle registration: TN-69, TN-92, TN-96
- Website: thoothukudi.nic.in

Thoothukkudi district (Tamil: [t̪uːt̪ːukːuɖi]) is one of the 38 districts of Tamil Nadu, a state in India. On 20 October 1986, the government led by M. G. Ramachandran (M.G.R.) bifurcated the Tirunelveli district to create this district. It shares its boundaries with the Tenkasi, Tirunelveli, Ramanathapuram, and Virudhunagar districts, as well as the Gulf of Mannar in the Bay of Bengal. The shape of the district resembles a mini India, being broad in the north and tapering towards the south. Thoothukudi serves as the headquarters and is the largest city in the district.

== Overview ==
=== History ===
On 20 October 1986, a new district carved out of the erstwhile Tirunelveli district in Tamil Nadu. It was named after V. O. Chidambaranar, a prominent national leader from Ottapidaram who played a significant role in the Swadeshi Movement in southern India. Since 1997, this district has also been referred to by the name of its headquarters city, Thoothukkudi, similar to other districts in Tamil Nadu.

=== Origin of the name of the district ===
The origin of the name Thoothukkudi is that, being a coastal town, the people used to tap drinking water by digging small ponds (oothu in Tamil), and Oothukudi, meaning dig pond and drink, became corrupted into Thoothukkudi. Ptolemy refers to this as SosiKorai. Certain scholars postulate that Sosikorai became corrupted into Thoothukkudi. Tuticorin is the anglicised corruption of Thoothukkudi. From 1760 to 1998, the name of the town found in official records was Tuticorin. In 1998, the government of Tamil Nadu directed to call it Thoothukkudi both in Tamil and English.

=== Geography ===
Thoothukkudi district is situated in the south-eastern corner of Tamil Nadu. It is bounded by the districts of Tenkasi on the northwest, Tirunelveli on the southwest, Ramanathapuram on the northeast, Virudhunagar on the north, and the Gulf of Mannar in the Bay of Bengal on the east. The total area of the district is 4,707 km^{2} (1,817 sq mi). Karumalai hillock in Kovilpatti and Vallanadu Hillock of the eastern ghat hillocks are the highest elevation point of the district which has a peak elevation of more than 200 metres from means sea level. Vallanadu Wildlife Sanctuary is one of the protected wildlife sanctuary of the district. Therikadu is a small red dry desert region present in the district which spans over 12,000 acres. this district is fed by Thamirabarani and Vaippar river basins.

=== Water Resources ===
The Thamirabarani River, which rises in Agasthyamalai of the Western Ghats, flows through Srivaikuntam and Tiruchendur taluks and joins the sea at Punnaikayal. Pambayaru and Manimutharu are the chief tributaries of Thamirabarani, which pass through the district. Thamirabarani and Manimutharu are the catchment areas of river basins, which have their place of origin in the Pothigai. The former has a length of 120 km, and the latter has a length of 98 km. Papanasam Dam, Manimuthar Dam, and Eppodumvendran Dam are the major dams built in the district.

== Demographics ==
Historical population
Year	Pop.	±% p.a.
1901	705,534	—
1911	762,625	+0.78%
1921	787,166	+0.32%
1931	840,656	+0.66%
1941	910,729	+0.80%
1951	957,735	+0.50%
1961	1,052,970	+0.95%
1971	1,228,295	+1.55%
1981	1,370,289	+1.10%
1991	1,475,872	+0.75%
2001	1,592,769	+0.77%
2011	1,750,176	+0.95%

Religions in Thoothukudi district (2011)
Religion	Percent
Hinduism	78.50%
Christianity	16.68%
Islam	4.61%
Other or not stated	0.21%

According to a 2011 census, the Thoothukudi district had a population of 1,750,176, with a sex-ratio of 1,023 females for every 1,000 males, much above the national average of 929. A total of 183,763 were under the age of six, constituting 93,605 males and 90,158 females.

Scheduled Castes and Scheduled Tribes accounted for 19.88% and 0.28% of the population, respectively, mostly in Ottapidaram. The average literacy of the district was 77.12%, compared to the national average of 72.99%. 50.10% of the population lived in urban areas. The district had a total of 462,010 households. There were a total of 748,095 workers, comprising 44,633 cultivators, 161,418 main agricultural labourers, 17,872 in house hold industries, 433,524 other workers, 90,648 marginal workers, 3,882 marginal cultivators, 39,226 marginal agricultural labourers, 4,991 marginal workers in household industries and 42,549 other marginal workers.

Languages of Thoothukudi district (2011)
1. Tamil (99.0%)
2. Telugu (0.54%)
3. Others (0.49%)

At the time of the 2011 census, 98.97% of the population spoke Tamil and 0.54% Telugu as their first language.

== Administrative divisions ==
Thoothukudi District is divided into three revenue divisions and ten taluks. There are forty-one revenue firkas and 480 revenue villages.

The district is divided into twelve revenue blocks for rural and urban development. The twelve revenue blocks are Thoothukudi, Tiruchendur, Udangudi, Sathankulam, Thiruvaikundam, Alwarthirunagari, Karunkulam, Ottapidaram, Kovilpatti, Kayathar, Vilathikulam, and Pudur. The district has one municipal corporation: Thoothukudi; three municipalities: Kayalpattinam, Kovilpatti and Tiruchendur; eighteen town panchayats: Alwarthirunagiri, Arumuganeri, Athur, Eral, Ettayapuram, Kadambur, Kalugumalai, Kanam, Kayatharu, Nazerath, Perungulam, Sathankulam, Sayapuram, Srivaikuntam, Thenthiruperai, Udangudi, V. Pudur and Vilathikulam and 403 panchayat villages.

== Administrative Setup ==
=== Revenue Administration ===
Revenue
Divisions	Taluks	Firkas	No. of Villages
Thoothukkudi	Thoothukkudi	Keelathattapparai	33
Thoothukkudi	Thoothukkudi	Mudivaithanendal	33
Thoothukkudi	Thoothukkudi	Pudukottai	33
Thoothukkudi	Thoothukkudi	Thoothukkudi	33
Thoothukkudi	Srivaikuntam	Deivaseyalpuram	46
Thoothukkudi	Srivaikuntam	Seydunganallur	46
Thoothukkudi	Srivaikuntam	Srivaikuntam	46
Thoothukkudi	Srivaikuntam	Vallanadu	46
Tiruchendur	Tiruchendur	Authoor	36
Tiruchendur	Tiruchendur	Tiruchendur	36
Tiruchendur	Tiruchendur	Udangudi	36
Tiruchendur	Sathankulam	Pallakurichi	25
Tiruchendur	Sathankulam	Sathankulam	25
Tiruchendur	Sathankulam	Srivenkateshwarapuram	25
Tiruchendur	Eral	Alwarthirunagiri	45
Tiruchendur	Eral	Arumugamangalam	45
Tiruchendur	Eral	Perungulam	45
Kovilpatti	Kovilpatti	Ilayarasanendal	33
Kovilpatti	Kovilpatti	Kalugumalai	33
Kovilpatti	Kovilpatti	Kovilpatti	33
Kovilpatti	Ettayapuram	Cholapuram	56
Kovilpatti	Ettayapuram	Ettayapuram	56
Kovilpatti	Ettayapuram	Kadalaiyur	56
Kovilpatti	Ettayapuram	Muthulapuram	56
Kovilpatti	Ettayapuram	Padarnthapuli	56
Kovilpatti	Vilathikulam	Kadalkudi	89
Kovilpatti	Vilathikulam	Kulathur	89
Kovilpatti	Vilathikulam	Pudur	89
Kovilpatti	Vilathikulam	Sivagnanapuram	89
Kovilpatti	Vilathikulam	Vembar	89
Kovilpatti	Vilathikulam	Vilathikulam	89
Kovilpatti	Ottapidaram	Eppodumvendran	63
Kovilpatti	Ottapidaram	Maniyachi	63
Kovilpatti	Ottapidaram	Ottapidaram	63
Kovilpatti	Ottapidaram	Parivillikottai	63
Kovilpatti	Ottapidaram	Pasuvanthanai	63
Kovilpatti	Ottapidaram	Vedanatham	63
Kovilpatti	Kayathar	Chettikurichi	54
Kovilpatti	Kayathar	Kadambur	54
Kovilpatti	Kayathar	Kamanayakkanpatti	54
Kovilpatti	Kayathar	Kayathar	54

=== Local Bodies Administration ===
Municipal Corporation (1)
No.	Name	Date of formation	No. of wards
1	Thoothukkudi City Municipal Corporation	5 August 2008	60
Municipality (3)
No.	Name	Date of formation	No. of wards
1	Kayalpattinam Municipality	11 June 2004	18
2	Kovilpatti Municipality	28 May 1998	36
3	Tiruchendur Municipality	11 September 2021	27
Town Panchayat (18)
Alwarthirunagari, Arumuganeri, Authoor, Eral, Ettayapuram, Kadambur, Kalugumalai, Kanam, Kayathar, Nazareth, Perungulam, Sathankulam, Sawyerpuram, Srivaikuntam, Thenthiruperai, Udangudi, V. Pudur, Vilathikulam

== Elected Representatives ==
=== Lok Sabha Constituency ===
No.	Constituency number	Constituency name	Reserved for	Elected member	Political party	Alliance
1	36	Thoothukkudi	General	Kanimozhi Rajathi Karunanidhi	Dravida Munnetra Kazhagam	None

=== Tamil Nadu Legislative Assembly Constituencies ===
No.	Name	Reserved for	Elected member	Party	Alliance
213	Vilathikulam	General	G. V. Markandayan	DMK	SPA
214	Thoothukkudi	General	A. Srinath	TVK	TVK+
215	Tiruchendur	General	Anitha R. Radhakrishnan	DMK	SPA
216	Srivaikuntam	General	G. Saravanan	TVK	TVK+
217	Ottapidaram	SC	P. Mathanraja	TVK	TVK+
218	Kovilpatti	General	K. Karunanithi	DMK	SPA

== Economy ==
The V. O. Chidambaranar Port contributes majorly to the economy of the district besides providing employment. Thoothukudi hosts industries such as SPIC, Thoothukudi alkaline chemicals, DCW zirconium plant and numerous salt packing companies. Many coal based power plants are at various stages of commissioning. Kovilpatti consists of many small sized industry especially match stick industries.

=== Agriculture ===
Paddy is the most cultivated crop in most of the villages like Uzhakkudi, Vallanadu, Aarumugamangalam, Palayakayal, Thiruvaikundam, Sattankulam and Tiruchendur taluks. Cumbu, Cholam, Kuthiraivali and other pulses are raised in the dry tracts of Kovilpatti, Vilathikulam, Nagalapuram Ottapidaram, and Thoothukudi taluks. Cotton is cultivated in Kovilpatti, Ottapidaram and Thoothukudi Taluks. Groundnut cultivation is undertaken in Kovilpatti, Tiruchendur, and Sattankulam taluks. Groundnut cake is being used as manure and cattle feed. Nagalapuram makes its economy to be solely dependent agriculture. Sugarcane and Plantain (Banana) are cultivated on a large scale along the stretch of Uzhakkudi. Banana and Beetel cultivation is more prominent in villages like Aarumugamanagalam and Yeral. Also vegetables like tomato, chillies, brinjal, lady's finger, beans are cultivated in village of Uzhakkudi. Summers are made use to cultivate cotton on a smaller scale. Main business of this area is dry chilly, cholam, cumbu, wood charcoal, etc. With 35% share, the district is the top producer of Cumbu in Tamil Nadu. Palmyrah trees are grown mostly in Tiruchendur, Srivaikundam, Sattankulam and Vilathikulam taluks. Jaggery is produced from palmyrah juice; the production of jaggery is the main occupation of the people of Tiruchendur and Sattankulam taluks. Banana and other vegetables are raised in Srivaikundam and Tiruchendur taluks.

=== Salt production ===
The district constitutes 70 percent of the total salt production of Tamil Nadu and 30 percent of that of India. Tamil Nadu is the second largest producer of salt in India next to Gujarat.

=== Transport ===
National Highway 45B, 7A and State Highways SH-32,33,40,44,75,76,77,93,176 connect to other parts of the State. Government buses connect the district with other parts of state. Thoothukudi and Kovilpatti railway station are the major stations of Indian Railways. V.O. Chidambaranar Port Authority in the district was declared as the tenth major seaport in India also provides container services. Thoothukudi Airport is situated at Vaigaikulam and currently has flights to and from Chennai and Bengaluru.

=== Spaceport ===
The Government of India is to set up a new Rocket launch pad near Kulasekaranpattinam in Thoothukudi district. The Indian Space Research Organisation (ISRO) has begun work on its second Rocket launching pad or Spaceport, which will be Kulasekaranpattinam, Thoothukudi in Tamil Nadu. Like the Sriharikota spaceport in the Satish Dhawan Space Centre, Thoothukudi was selected as a spaceport due to its nearness to the equator. "A rocket launch site should be on the east coast and near the equator. And Thoothukudi district satisfies that condition", a former ISRO official stated.

=== Education ===
There are numerous educational institutions, colleges, schools providing education. The Agricultural College and Research Institute, Killikulam was established in 1984–85 as the third constituent College of Tamil Nadu Agricultural University.

== Notable people ==
Name	Description
Anitha R. Radhakrishnan	Former Minister for Fisheries – Fishermen Welfare and Animal Husbandry of Tamil Nadu
Appukutty	Film Actor
Bayilvan Ranganathan	Film Actor
Beela Venkatesan	Former Principal Secretary for Energy of Tamil Nadu
Charle	Film Actor
Cottalango Leon	Indian-American Engineer
Cruz Fernandez	Father of Modern Thoothukkudi
D. Selvaraj	Founder of Oorvasi Detergent Soap
Deepa Shankar	Film Actress
Dinesh Karthik	Former Cricketer
Hari	Film Director
J. J. Christdoss	Former Anglican Bishop of Tinnevelly
J. Jayasingh Thiyagaraj Natterjee	Former Member of Parliament of the Republic of India
J. Kanakaraj	Former Judge
J. P. Chandrababu	Film Actor
Jaguar Thangam	Film Stunt Choreographer
Jeswin Aldrin	Athlete
John Vijay	Film Actor
K. P. Kandasamy	Founder of Dinakaran
K. T. Kosalram	Freedom Fighter
Kaali Venkat	Film Actor
Kadambur C. Raju	Former Minister for Information and Publicity of Tamil Nadu
Kadambur M. R. Janarthanan	Former Minister of State for Personnel, Public Grievances and Pensions of the Republic of India
Ki. Rajanarayanan	Writer
Ku. Alagirisami	Writer
Kumaraguruparar	Poet
M. H. Jawahirullah	Founder of the Manithaneya Makkal Katchi
Maveeran Alagumuthu Kone	Freedom Fighter
Mari Selvaraj	Film Director
Naveen Raja Jacob	Volleyball player
Oomaithurai	Poligar
P. Geetha Jeevan	Former Minister for Social Welfare and Women Empowerment of Tamil Nadu
P. Rajagopal	Founder of Saravanaa Bhavan
P. Sri Acharya	Scholar
Poomani	Writer
R. Dhanuskodi Athithan	Former Minister of State for Youth Affairs and Sports of the Republic of India
R. Nallakannu	Former State Secretary of the Communist Party of India
Rajendran	Film Actor
Redin Kingsley	Film Actor
S. M. Abdul Jabbar	Cricket Commentator
S. N. Rajendran	Former Minister for Environmental Pollution Control of Tamil Nadu
S. P. Adithanar	Former Speaker of the Tamil Nadu Legislative Assembly
S. P. Shunmuganathan	Former Minister for Milk and Dairy Development of Tamil Nadu
S. R. Jeyadurai	Former Member of Parliament of the Republic of India
S. T. Chellapandian	Former Minister for Labour of Tamil Nadu
Sasikala Pushpa	Former Member of Parliament of the Republic of India
Shenbaga	Film Actress
Shiv Nadar	Founder of HCLTech
Sivanthi Adithan	Former Chairman of Dina Thanthi
Stunt Silva	Film Actor
Subramania Bharati	Freedom Fighter
T. P. Muthulakshmi	Film Actress
T. S. Balaiah	Film Actor
Thengai Srinivasan	Film Actor
Umaru Pulavar	Poet
V. O. Chidambaram	Freedom Fighter
V. Radhika Selvi	Former Minister of State for Home Affairs of the Republic of India
Vanchinathan	Freedom Fighter
Veeran Sundaralingam	Freedom Fighter
Veerapandiya Kattabomman	Freedom Fighter

== See also ==
- Thoothukudi Airport
- Thoothukudi massacre
- V. O. Chidambaranar Port
- List of districts of Tamil Nadu
- Custodial death of P Jayaraj and Bennicks
