= Church Missionary Society in India =

Missionary Society in India

Church Missionary Society
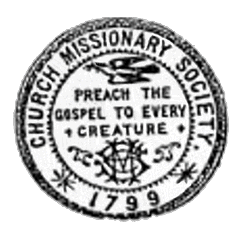
- CMS logo
- Abbreviation: CMS
- Formation: 12 April 1799
- Founder: Clapham Sect
- Type: Evangelical Anglicanism; Ecumenism; Protestant missionary British Commonwealth

The Church Missionary Society in India was a branch organisation established by the Church Missionary Society (CMS), which was founded in Britain in 1799 under the name the Society for Missions to Africa and the East, as a mission society working with the Anglican Communion, other Protestants, and Orthodox Christians around the world. In 1812, the British organization was renamed the Church Missionary Society.

In 1814 the CMS began sending missionaries to India and established mission stations at Chennai (Madras) and Bengal, then in 1816 at Travancore. The mission stations were extended across India in the following years. The work among women was mainly left to the Church of England Zenana Missionary Society and the Zenana Bible and Medical Mission.

== The CMS in India ==
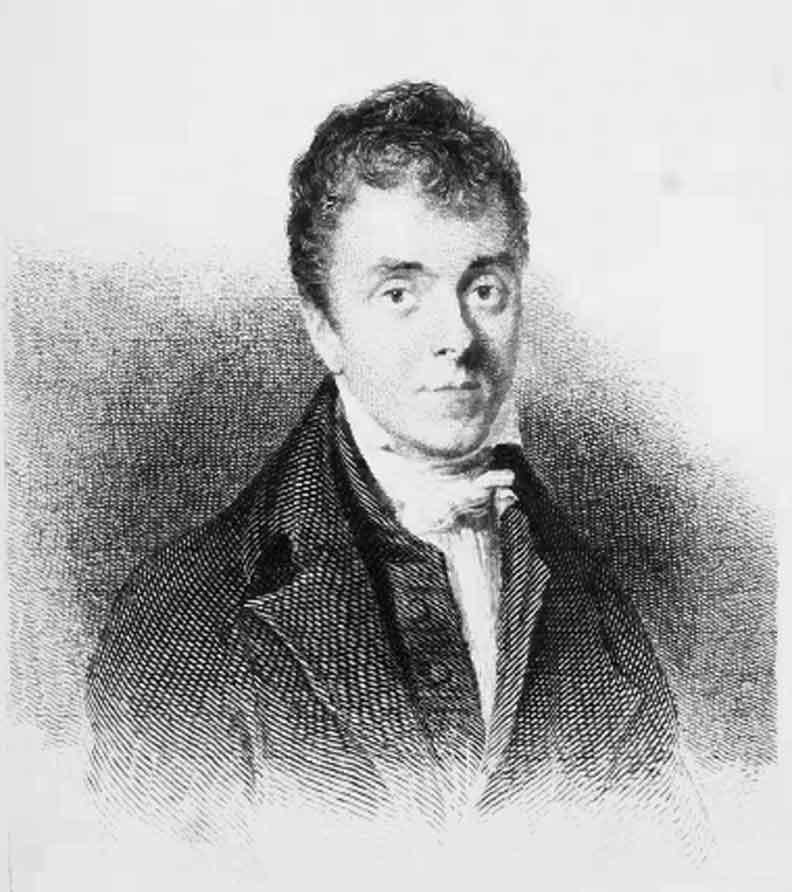
Henry Martyn, missionary to India and Persia

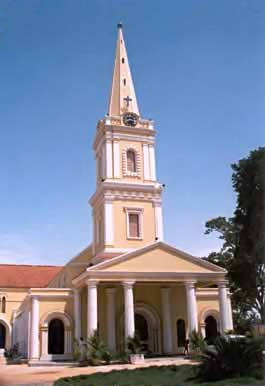
Holy Trinity Cathedral, Palayamkottai, Tirunelveli - Built by Rev. Charles Rhenius

The East India Company controlled access to India and only allowed its chaplains to work among the European communities. The Reverend Henry Martyn wanted to offer his services to the Church Missionary Society, however a financial disaster in Cornwall deprived him and his unmarried sister of the income their father had left for them. It was necessary for Martyn to earn an income that would support his sister as well as himself. He accordingly obtained a chaplaincy under the East India Company and left for India on 5 July 1805. William Wilberforce campaigned for the revision of the charter of the East India Company to permit missionaries to work in India. When the Charter Bill was passed in 1813 the CMS had missionaries ready for the India mission. The Revd Charles Rhenius and the Revd John Christian Schnarre were the first CMS missionaries to arrive at India and were sent to work at Chennai (Madras). Charles Rhenius later worked in Tirunelveli (Tinnevelly).

The CMS sent 7 missionaries to India in 1814-1816: two were placed at Chennai (Madras), two at Bengal and three at Travancore (1816). The Indian missions were extended in the following years to a number of locations including Agra, Meerut district, Varanasi (Benares), Mumbai (Bombay) (1820), Tirunelveli (Tinnevelly) (1820) and Kolkata (Calcutta) (1822).

New mission stations were later established in the Telugu Country (1841) and at Lahore in the Punjab region (1852).

While the Revolt of 1857 resulted in damage to the missions in the North West Provinces, after the revolt the CMS expanded its missions to Oudh, Allahabad, the Santhal people (1858), and to Kashmir (1865).

In 1899, B. Baring-Gould and his daughter Elizabeth oversaw the missions in India and China supporting the development of additional hospitals and schools. Their work describe the balance between westernized education and medical care versus Christian conversion.

== Kolkata (Calcutta) ==
The CMS mission in Calcutta was started in 1822. The first CMS school was opened at Kidderpore, a suburb of Calcutta, in 1816; and the first girls’ school in 1822, by Miss M. A. Cooke, at Calcutta. Reginald Heber, the Bishop of Calcutta (1823–1826) supported the work of the CMS mission.

The Revd James Long joined the mission in 1840. Edward Stuart served in India from 1850 to 1874. He was the Secretary of the Church Missionary Society at Calcutta. He also served at Agra and at Jalalpur.

== Agra ==
Valpy French arrived in India in 1851. He was sent to Agra, where he founded the St. John's College, Agra in 1853.

== Lahore ==
The CMS mission in Lahore started in 1852. The Revd H. U. Weitbrecht was sent to India in 1875 to be the Vice Principal of St. John's Divinity College, Lahore. Valpy French became the first Bishop of Lahore in 1877.

== Mission in Kerala ==
The contribution made by the society in creating and maintaining educational institutions in Kerala, the most literate state in India, is significant. Many colleges and schools in Kerala and Tamil Nadu still have CMS in their names. Among the oldest in modern India, the CMS College Kottayam is regarded a pioneer in popularising secondary education in southern India, whose famous alumni include former Indian President K. R. Narayanan, career diplomats K.P.S. Menon and K. M. Panikkar as well as scientist E. C. George Sudarshan.

The Revd Benjamin Bailey was appointed to the Kottayam mission in the Indian state of Kerala in 1816 and in 1821 he established a printing press. Benjamin Bailey translated the complete Bible to Malayalam language. He also authored the first printed Malayalam-English Dictionary. He is considered as the father of Malayalam printing.

== CMS activities in the 20th Century ==
The CMS continued to send missionaries to India, including Frank Lake in 1937.

== See also ==
- Protestantism in India
- Christianity in India
- List of Protestant missionaries in India
- History of Christian missions
