= List of Protestant missionaries in India =

Several mission societies, including the Baptist Missionary Society, Society for Promoting Christian Knowledge, London Missionary Society, Basel Mission, Church MIssion Society, Society for the Propagation of the Gospel in Foreign Parts, Zenana missions, Medical Mission, American Missionary Association, Danish Missionary Society, and American Methodist Episcopal Mission, have contributed for the progressive Christian community in India. These missionaries have made a vast contributions in the districts of Tinnevelly and Travancore, which covers most of southern India Kerala. These missions were mostly influenced under the direct control of the Church of England.

The following is an incomplete list of protestant missionaries in India.

== Missionaries ==
- John Anderson – Missionary from Church of Scotland – Founder – Madras Christian College
- Elizabeth Baring-Gould
- B. Baring-Gould – CMS Missionary
- Graham Basanti – female missionary at Jeypore Evangelical Lutheran Church
- Paul Olaf Bodding - Norwegian missionary
- Paul Wilson Brand - medical missionary
- Edith Mary Brown - creator of the Christian Medical College Ludhiana
- Nathan Brown - missionary to India and Japan
- Robert Caldwell - missionary and linguist
- Eliza Caldwell – wife of Robert Caldwell, and Daughter of Rev. Charles Mault
- William Carey - Particular Baptist who founded the Serampore College and the Serampore University
- Amy Carmichael - missionary with the Church of England Zenana Missionary Society
- Alexander Duff - Free Church of Scotland missionary
- Cynthia Farrar - one of first unmarried women missionaries. Worked as an educator.
- Anthony Norris Groves - missionary to India and Baghdad
- Hermann Gundert – German linguist and Basel missionary to India
- Reginald Heber – Bishop of Calcutta
- John Christian Frederick Heyer - missionary to Andhra Pradesh
- Sam Higginbottom - missionary to Allahabad
- Henry Constantine Huxtable – SPG missionary at Sawyerpuram and Christianagaram
- John Nelson Hyde - missionary in the Punjab
- Lyman Jewett - Baptist missionary in Ongole, Andhra Pradesh
- E. Stanley Jones - Methodist missionary
- Samuel H. Kellogg – translator of Hindi Bible
- Eugen Liebendörfer – German physician and Basel missionary to India
- James Long – Church Missionary Society missionary
- Arthur Margoschis – Nazareth, Tamil Nadu – SPG missionary
- Joshua Marshman - Baptist missionary in Bengal
- Samuel Martin - Presbyterian missionary in the Punjab
- Henry Martyn – Church Missionary Society missionary
- William Miller – Missionary from Church of Scotland – Madras Christian College
- Donald McGavran - third generation missionary
- Julia Lore McGrew - medical missionary of the Woman's Foreign Missionary Society of the Methodist Episcopal Church
- Volbrecht Nagel – German missionary to the Malabar coast
- James Edward Lesslie Newbigin – Ordained in Church of Scotland; affiliated with the United Reformed Church; served in the Church of South India
- Robert Turlington Noble – Founder of Noble College, Machilipatnam
- Peter Percival – Wesleyan Methodist Mission
- George Pettitt – Church Missionary Society missionary
- J. Waskom Pickett - American Methodist missionary to Lucknow
- Jessie Kelp Pigott - in Allahabad and Delhi (1887–9)
- Hopestill Pillow – Zenana Missionary to India
- Heinrich Plütschau - German Lutheran missionary to Tharangambadi
- George Uglow Pope - Anglican missionary to Tamil Nadu
- Charles Frederick Reeve - commenced the non-denominational Poona and Indian Village Mission in 1893
- C. T. E. Rhenius – first Church Missionary Society missionary
- William Tobias Ringeltaube, (1770-1816) – LMS Missionary to south Travancore (first Missionary to South Travancore, 1806)
- Bishop Edward Sargent – Church Missionary Society missionary
- Benjamin Schultze – translated the Bible into Tamil, the New Testament into Telugu and part of Genesis into Dakkhini
- Christian Friedrich Schwarz – German S.P.C.K. Missionary
- Ida S. Scudder - third generation medical missionary, founder of the Christian Medical College Vellore
- Scudder family – family of medical missionaries
- Lars Olsen Skrefsrud - Norwegian Lutheran missionary
- George Trevor Spencer (Wikisource) – Lord Bishop of Madras
- Graham Staines - Australian missionary murdered in India
- William Arthur Stanton – American Baptist Missionary in South Indian town of Kurnool of Andhra Pradesh.
- J.M. Strachan – Medical Mission at Nazareth, Tamil Nadu – SPG missionary – Bishop of Rangoon
- Alfred Sturge - Baptist missionary
- Ralph T. Templin - Methodist missionary and activist
- H. U. Weitbrecht – Church Missionary Society missionary, author of "The Revision of the Urdu New Testament"
- William Ward - Baptist missionary
- Charlotte White – first unmarried American woman missionary
- Joyce M. Woollard - missionary to Bangalore
- Bartholomäus Ziegenbalg - German Lutheran missionary to Tharangambadi

== See also ==
- List of Roman Catholic missionaries in India
- Mission (Christian)
- Christianity in India
