= Woollard (disambiguation) =

Woollard is a village in Somerset, England.

Woollard may also refer to:

== People ==
- Alison Woollard (born 1968), British geneticist
- Chad Woollard (born 1979), Canadian ice hockey player
- Frank George Woollard (1883–1957), British mechanical engineer
- Gary Woollard, New Zealand rugby league player
- Herbert Henry Woollard (1889–1939), Australian academic
- Janet Woollard (born 1955), Australian politician
- Joan Elizabeth Woollard (1916–2008), British artist
- Joanne Woollard (died 2015), British art director
- Joyce M. Woollard (1923–1997), British missionary in India
- William Woollard (born 1939), British television producer
- Bob Woollard (born 1940), American basketball player
- Denise Woollard (born 1940s), Canadian Alberta politician
- John Woollard (1880–1965), Australian rules footballer

== Other uses ==
- Mount Woollard, in Antarctica

== See also ==
- Woollard v. Gallagher, a United States lawsuit
