= Bible translations into Hindi and Urdu =

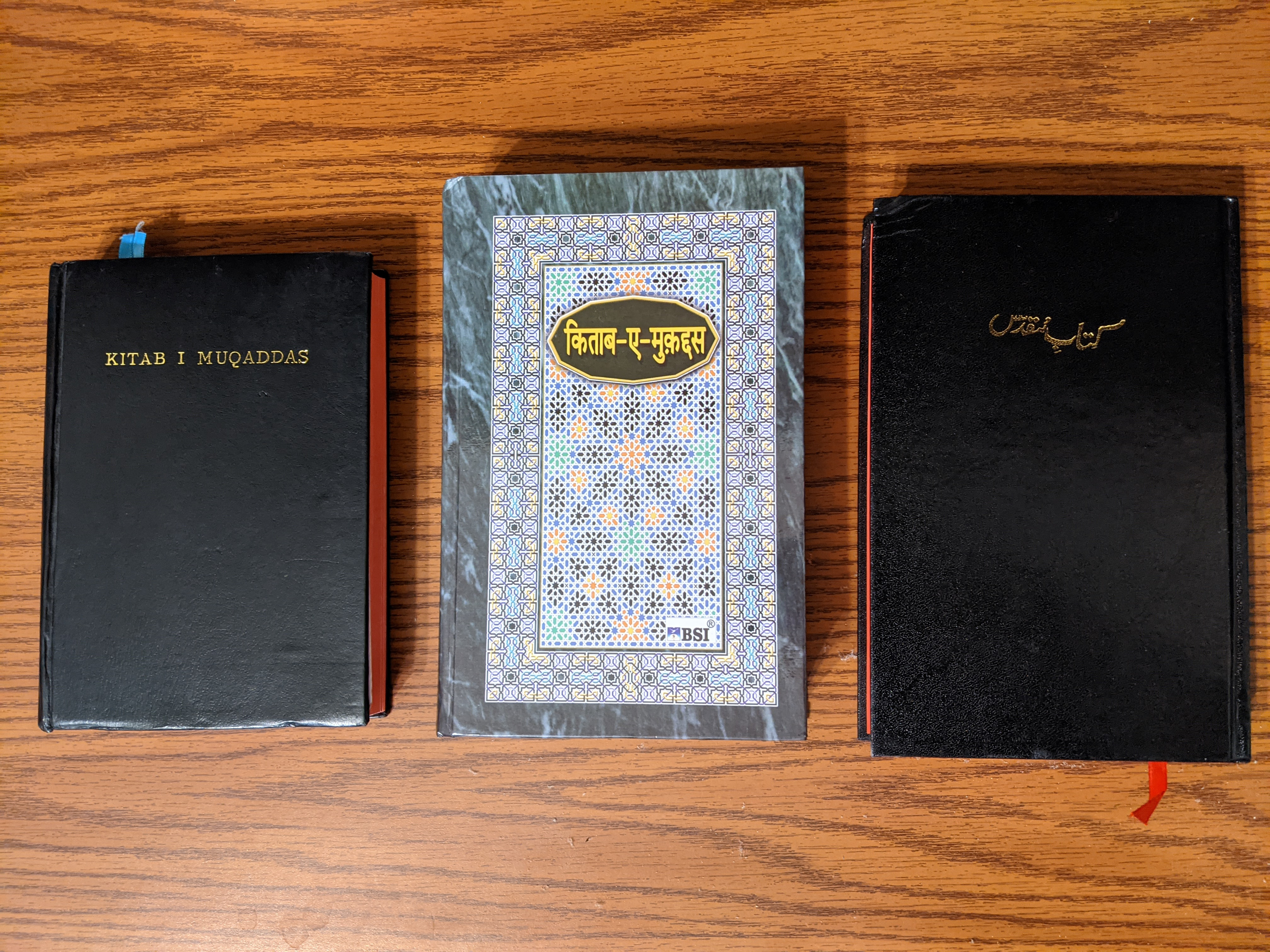
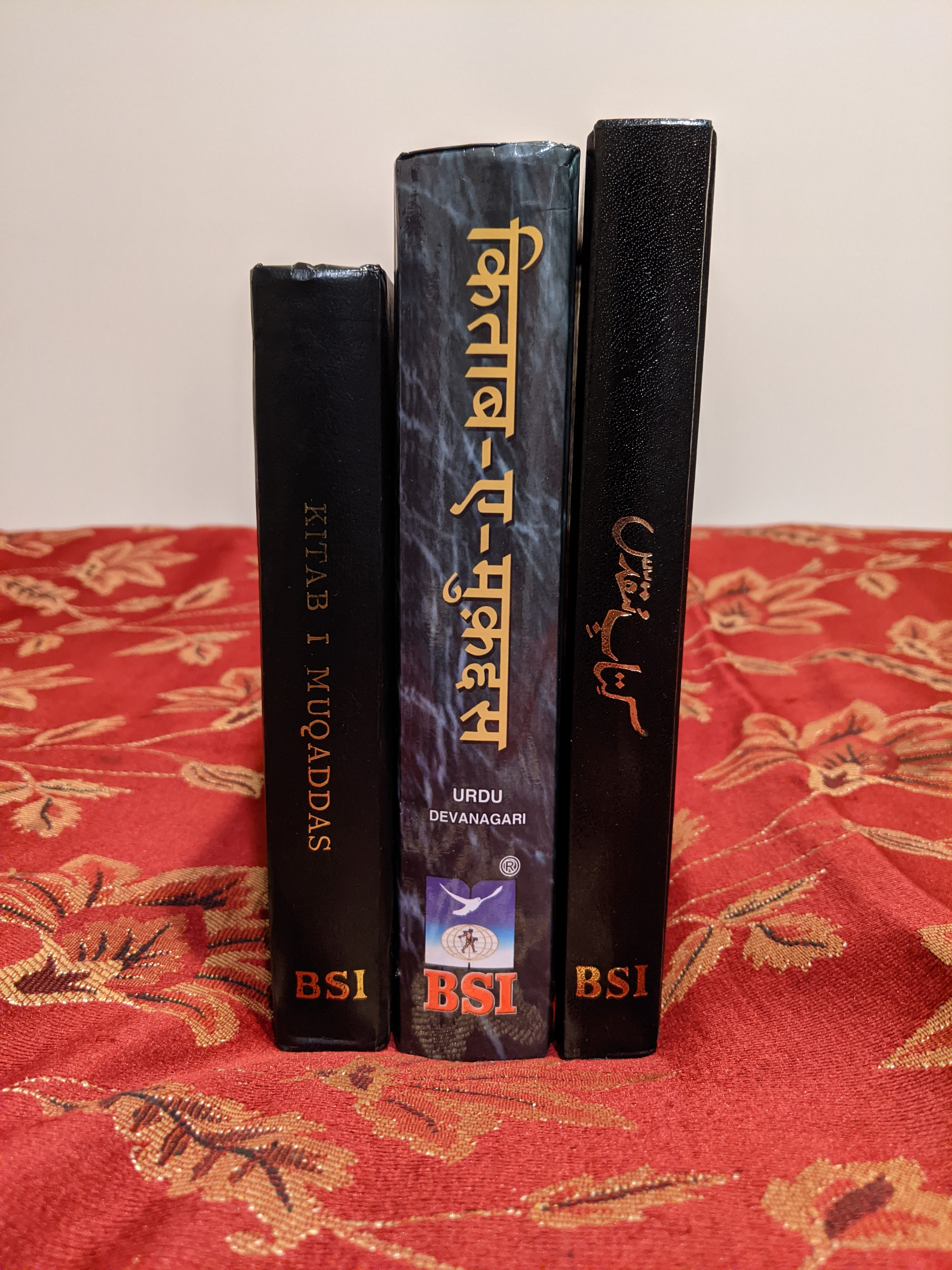
Urdu copies of the Bible in Roman, Devanagari, and Nastaliq scripts (published by the Bible Society of India).

The modern Hindi and Urdu standards are highly mutually intelligible in colloquial form, but use different scripts when written, and have less mutual intelligibility in literary forms. The history of Bible translations into Hindi and Urdu is closely linked, with the early translators of the Hindustani language simply producing the same version with different scripts: Devanagari and Nastaliq, as well as their romanisations.

The Hindustani translations of the Bible produced by Benjamin Schultze and Henry Martyn became the basis for subsequent versions published by various scholars.

== History ==
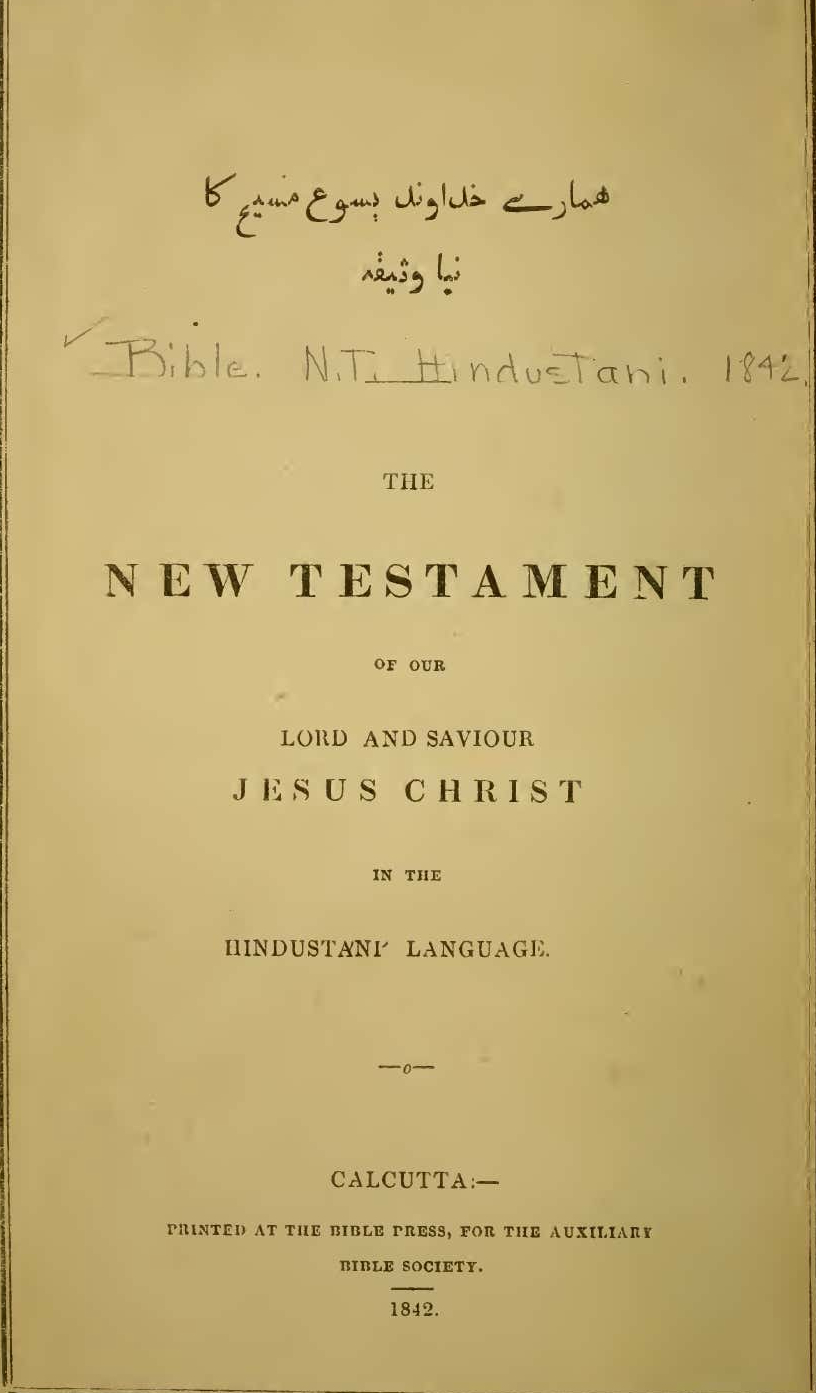
New testament cover page of Hindustani language published in 1842

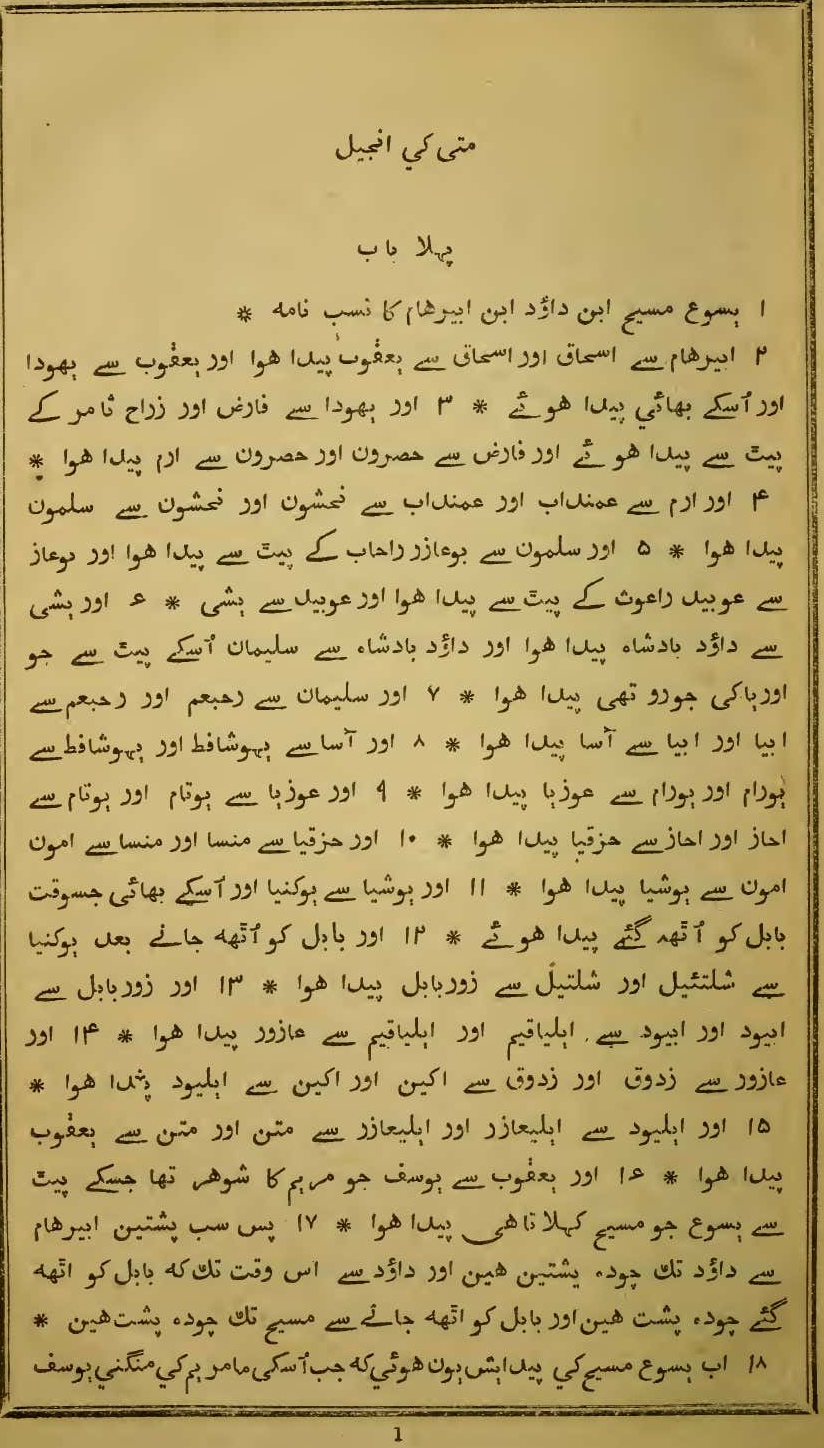
First chapter of Gospel of Matthew in Hindustani language

Early Hindustani Bible translations were undertaken by Winfried Ketlar, Benjamin Schultze and Casiano Baligati in the 17th and 18th centuries. The first translation of part of the Bible in Hindi, Genesis, was made in manuscript by Benjamin Schultze (1689–1760), a German missionary, who arrived in India to establish an English mission in 1726 and worked on completing Bartholomäus Ziegenbalg's Bible translations into Tamil and then Bible translations into Telugu. His translation of parts of Genesis was published in Halle in 1745 along with a grammar of the local Hindi language he had encountered in Madras. Henry Martyn printed the New Testament in the Urdu script in 1814. Both versions produced by Benjamin Schultze and Henry Martyn became the basis for subsequent versions translated by various scholars, including William Bowley, John Chamberlain, John Thompson, William Yachts, Leslie Parson, F.E. Schneider and William Hooper.

Additionally, in 1805, Bible translators at the College of Fort William began to translate the Bible in various Indian languages, including Hindustani. Both New Testament and Old Testament have been translated into Hindustani and were published in 1819, 1842 and 1867 respectively from Kolkata and Madras in Nastaliq and Latin script.

== Contemporary translations ==
=== Hindi ===
As with Bible translations into Bengali (his own work), and into Odia, Sanskrit, Marathi, and Assamese (with the aid of local scholars) an important early stage of the Hindi Bible rests with the work of William Carey in Serampore. Though this had to be revised by John Parsons of Monghyr. Carey attracted also the interest of Henry Martyn, later of Persia, to Hindi. Presbyterian Samuel H. Kellogg who taught at the seminary in Allahabad headed three translators working on translation of the Old Testament into Hindi, including William Hooper, of the Church Missionary Society, and Joseph Arthur Lambert. Kellogg's Hindi Grammar (1876, 1893) is still consulted today. However, 18 years after Kellogg's death in 1899, Edwin Greaves of the London Missionary Society, and author of a Grammar of Modern Hindi (1896, 1908, 1921), in 1917 signalled his concerns about the adequacy of Hindi Bible translations in his Report on Protestant Hindi Christian literature.

In collaboration with Church centric bible translation, Free Bibles India has published a Hindi translation online.

In 2016, the New World Translation of the Holy Scriptures was released by Jehovah's Witnesses as a complete Bible translation in Hindi. This replaced the earlier partial translation comprising only the New Testament.

=== Urdu ===
The New Testament was first translated into the Deccani dialect of Hindi-Urdu by Benjamin Shultze of the Danish Mission in 1745. Robert Cotton Mather printed new editions at Mirzapur in 1870.

The first complete Bible was first published in northern Urdu in 1843 - translated by Henry Martyn.

The Revised Version (URD) Kitab-e-Muqaddas of 1943 was published by both the Bible Society of India and the Pakistan Bible Society. It was translated from the original Hebrew, Aramaic and Greek. Minor revisions were published in 1955, 1989, 1998 and 2005. In India it is available in the Nastaʿlīq, Devanagari and Roman Urdu scripts. In Pakistan it was published in the Nastaʿlīq script only.

The Revised Version was adapted for Catholics, with changes in vocabulary and the addition of deuterocanonical books. It was published by the Pakistan Bible Society for the Catholic Bible Commission Pakistan in 1958 under the title Kalam-e-Muqaddas. The New Testament was revised in 2010. The Old Testament and deutero-canonical books are still in preparation.

Using the semantic-equivalence principles behind the Good News Bible in English, a Common Language Urdu New Testament was prepared under the Eugene Glassman in the 1970s. However, in the face of much opposition from the Christian community within Pakistan, the project was dropped. It was however published by the Bible Society of India.

In 2003-2004 the Easy-to-Read version (ERV-UR) Muqaddas Baibal was published by the World Bible Translation Center (now Bible League). This was based on the Easy to Read version in English.

In 2004 the Bible was made available online, but in PDF or image format only, due to the difficulties of typesetting the Nastaʿlīq script. In 2009 a Unicode version was made available, beginning with the New Testament. The complete Bible online in Unicode is also available.

The International Bible Society (now known as Biblica) published the New Testament of the New Urdu Bible Version (NUBV) in 2009. This is based on their 1983 revision of New International Version (NIV) in English. It was published in India only, not in Pakistan.

In 2011 the Urdu Geo Version was published by Geolink Resources LLC. This is a completely new translation from the original languages. This uses modern, understandable Urdu. It includes more vocabulary that is easily understood by a Muslim readership.

The Urdu Contemporary Version (UCV) Urdu Hamasar Tarjama of the New Testament was published by Biblica in 2015. The Old Testament is still in preparation.

In collaboration with Church-Centric Bible Translation, Free Bibles India has published the Indian Revised Version (IRV) in the Devanagari script online in 2019.

Henry Martyn's translation - with corrections from the King James Version of 1611 was published by the Holy Bible Foundation in 2016.

In 2015, the New Testament of the New World Translation of the Holy Scriptures was released in Urdu (Nastaʿlīq script) by Jehovah's Witnesses.

A Commentary on the Glorious Gospel - (Volume 1) Tafseer-e-Injeel-e-Jaleel (Jild-e-Awal) was published in 2019 by the Institute of Eastern Studies and Research. It contains only Matthew, Mark, Luke, John, Acts and Revelation. This was produced in literary Urdu by Islamic scholars. It includes the original Greek text of Codex Sinaiticus in the older uncial script, an Urdu word-for-word interlinear translation and an idiomatic translation. There are also some notes and commentary. The word Commentary in its title relates to the Islamic theology which maintains that only the text in the original language can be given the name of the book (e.g. Torah), any "translation" is in fact a commentary.

== Comparison ==
| Translation | John 3:16 |
|---|---|
| Original Greek in the uncial script of the oldest manuscripts (adapted to font available) | ΟΥΤWC ΓΑΡ ΗΓΑΠΗCΕΝ Ο ΘΕΟC ΤΟΝ ΚΟCΜΟΝ WCΤΕ ΤΟΝ ΥΙΟΝ ΑΥΤΟΥ ΤΟΝ ΜΟΝΟΓΕΝΗ ΕΔWΚΕΝ ΙΝΑ ΠΑC Ο ΠΙCΤΕΥWΝ ΕΙC ΑΥΤΟΝ ΜΗ ΑΠΟΛΗΤΑΙ ΑΛΛ ΕΧΗ ΖWΗΝ ΑΙWΝΙΟΝ |
| Original Greek in minuscule script | Οὕτως γὰρ ἠγάπησεν ὁ θεὸς τὸν κόσμον ὥστε τὸν ⸀υἱὸν τὸν μονογενῆ ἔδωκεν, ἵνα πᾶς ὁ πιστεύων εἰς αὐτὸν μὴ ἀπόληται ἀλλὰ ἔχῃ ζωὴν αἰώνιον. |
| Henry Martyn's translation | کیونکہ خدا نے جہان کو ایسا پیار کیاھی، کہ اُس نےاپنااِکلوتا بیٹا بخشا تاکہ جو کوئی اُس اِیمان لاوے ہلاک نہ ہوے، بلکہ ہمیشہ کی زندگی پاوے۔ |
| Revised Version (URD) | کیونکہ خُدا نے دُنیا سے اَیسی مُحبّت رکھّی کہ اُس نے اپنا اِکلَوتا بیٹا بخش دِیا تاکہ جو کوئی اُس پر اِیمان لائے ہلاک نہ ہو بلکہ ہمیشہ کی زِندگی پائے۔ |
| Common Language (CL) (here identical to URD, apart from 'erab) | کیونکہ خُدا نے دُنیا سے ایسی محبت رکھی کہ اُس نے اپنا اِکلَوتا بیٹا بخش دیا تاکہ جو کوئی اُس پر ایمان لائے ہلاک نہ ہو بلکہ ہمیشہ کی زندگی پائے۔ |
| Easy to read version (UR-ERV) | ہاں! خدا نے دنیا سے محبت رکھی ہے اسی لئے اس نے اسکو اپنا بیٹا دیاہے ۔ خدا نے اپنا بیٹا دیا تا کہ ہر آدمی جو اس پر ایمان لا ئے جو کھوتا نہیں مگر ہمیشہ کی زندگی پاتا ہے ۔ |
| New Urdu Bible Version (NUBV) | کیونکہ خُدا نے دُنیا سے اِس قدر محبّت کی کہ اپنا اکلوتا بیٹا بخش دِیا تاکہ جو کوئی اُس پر اِیمان لائے ہلاک نہ ہو بلکہ ہمیشہ کی زندگی پائے۔ |
| Urdu Geo Version (UGV) | کیونکہ اللہ نے دنیا سے اِتنی محبت رکھی کہ اُس نے اپنے اکلوتے فرزند کو بخش دیا، تاکہ جو بھی اُس پر ایمان لائے ہلاک نہ ہو بلکہ ابدی زندگی پائے۔ |
| Urdu Contemporary Version (UCV) | کیونکہ خُدا نے دُنیا سے اِس قدر مَحَبّت کی کہ اَپنا اِکلوتا بیٹا بَخش دیا تاکہ جو کویٔی بیٹے پر ایمان لایٔے ہلاک نہ ہو بَلکہ اَبدی زندگی پایٔے۔ |
| Tafseer-e-Injil-e-Jaleel | کیون کہ اللہ نے دنیا سے ایسا پیار کیاکہ (اُس نے) لا ثانی لاڈلا (بھیجا) تاکہ ہر شخص جو اُس پر اٰیمان لائے ہلاک نہ ہو، بلکہ اُسے ابدی زندگی ملے۔ |
| New World Translation (Jehovah's Witnesses) | کیونکہ خدا کو دُنیا سے اِتنی محبت ہے کہ اُس نے اپنا اِکلوتا بیٹا دے دیا تاکہ جو کوئی اُس پر ایمان ظاہر کرے، وہ ہلاک نہ ہو بلکہ ہمیشہ کی زندگی پائے۔ |
| Hindi Bible online | क्योंकि परमेश्वर ने जगत से ऐसा प्रेम रखा कि उस ने अपना एकलौता पुत्र दे दिया, ताकि जो कोई उस पर विश्वास करे, वह नाश न हो, परन्तु अनन्त जीवन पाए। (In Nastaliq: کیونکہ پرمیشور نے جگت سے ایسا پریم رکھا کہ اُس نے اپنا ایکلوتا پُترہ دے دیا، تاکہ جو کوئی اُس پر وِشواس کرے، وہ ناش نہ ہو، پرنت اݨت جیون پائےء۔) |
