= Bible translations into Tamil =

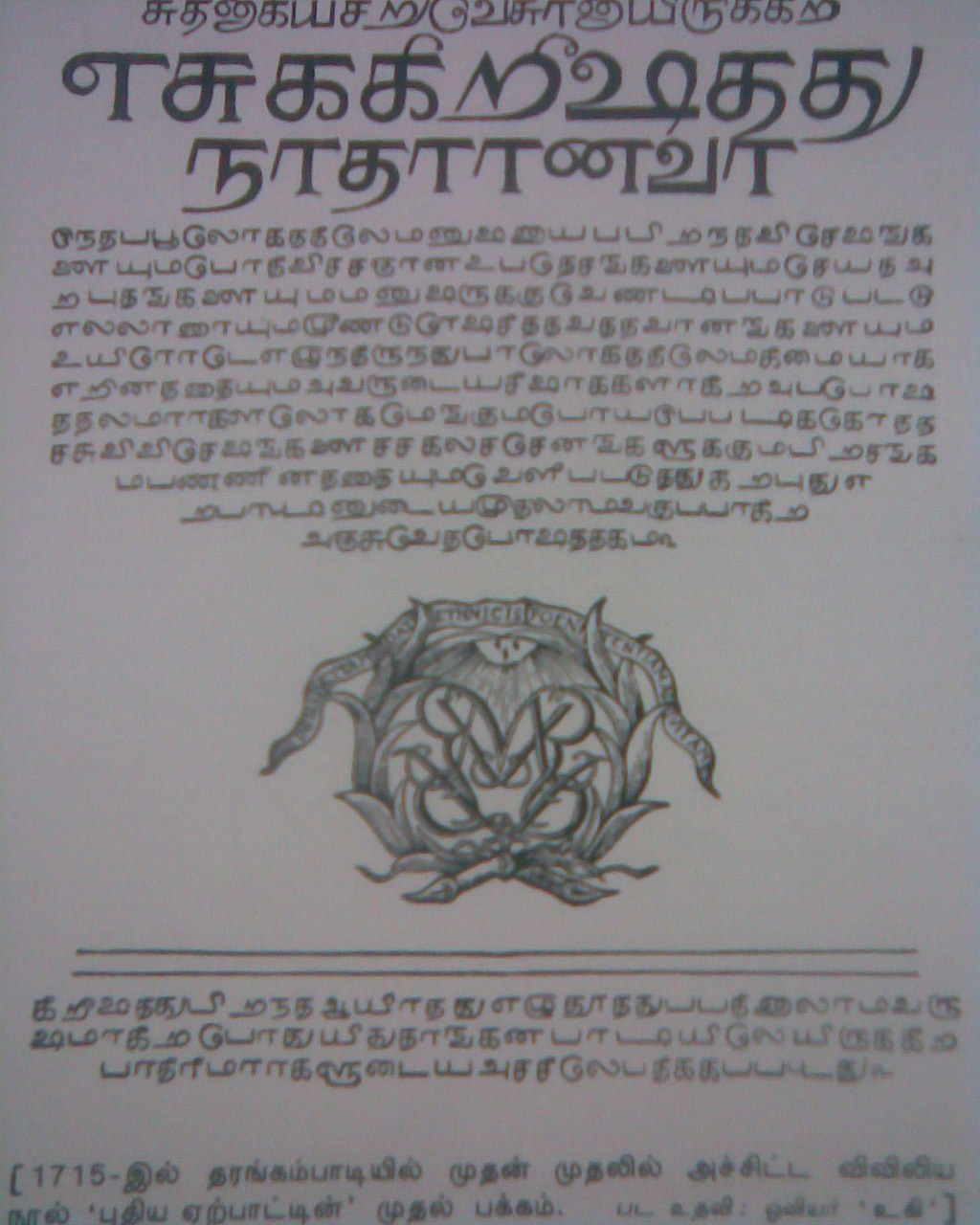
Tamil Bible printed in 1715 at Tharangambadi

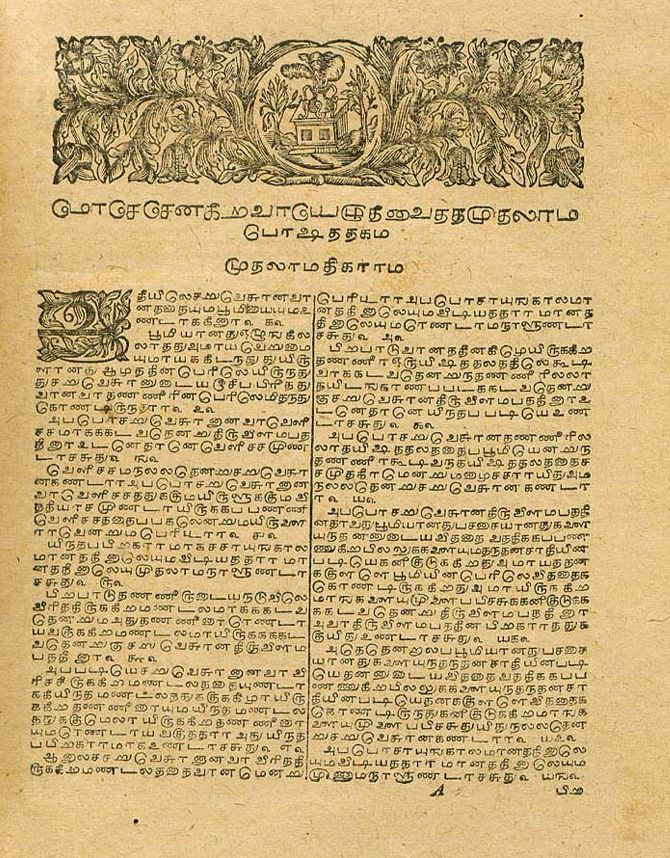
A page of Genesis in Ziegenbalg & Fabricius's version, 1723

The history of Bible translations into the Tamil language commences with the arrival of Bartholomäus Ziegenbalg at Tranquebar in 1706.Johann Philipp Fabricius, a German, revised Ziegenbalg's and others work to produce the standard Tamil version. Seventy years after Fabricius, at the invitation of Peter Percival a Saiva scholar, Arumuka Navalar, produced a "tentative" translation, which is known as the "Navalar version," and was largely rejected by Tamil Protestants.

== Beginning of Bible translation ==
The history of Bible translation into Tamil begins with the arrival of Bartholomäus Ziegenbalg (German missionary) at the Danish settlement of Tranquebar in 1706. He had a remarkable gift for languages and he was tireless in diligence and made rapid progress. He had completed the translation of the New Testament within five years of his arrival in the Tamil area; it was published in 1714, and by 1719, the year of his death, he had finished the Old Testament up to the Book of Ruth. The remaining work was completed by another German missionary, Benjamin Schultze, and published in Tranquebar in 1728. Philip Fabricius, also a German, spent twenty four years on the translation of the Bible which was published in 1777.

The British and Foreign Bible Society was established in the 19th century. The translation of scripture in several Indian languages in association with William Carey began to emerge. Even in the Tamil area Dr. Buchanan reported in his memorable journey in 1806 that there was a 'great cry for Bibles'. People followed him crying,

We don't want bread or money from you, but we want the Word of God.

The first project of the Bible Society in Tamil was given to C. T. E. Rhenius (born 1790), a German, who had come to work under the Church Missionary Society at Tirunelveli. He brought out the New Testament in 1833. In 1840 the Bible Society published its first edition of the whole Bible in Tamil: the Old Testament consisting of the translation of Fabricius and the New Testament that of Rhenius.

The Jaffna translation called the Tentative Version was brought out in 1850. Since the Jaffna version had failed to gain general acceptance another version was called for; and after prolonged negotiations, a revision committee representative of several missions working in South India, with Dr. Henry Bower as chief translator, was appointed in 1857. The New Testament was published in 1863 and the Old Testament in 1868; but the renderings of the Bower Committee aroused grave dissatisfaction in north Ceylon and a conference of delegates from both sides was called. A mutually accepted version of the whole Bible called the Union Version, because of the representative character of those who had produced it, was published in 1871. In effect it displaced all previous versions and won its way into the affection of all Churches in India and Ceylon. The Lutheran Church continued to use the Fabricius version.

== Translations ==
=== Bible Society of India ===
Bible society of India produced the translation widely used by Protestants in Tamil Nadu.

=== Free Bibles India ===
In collaboration with Church centric bible translation, Free Bibles India has published a Tamil translation online.

=== New World Translation ===
In 2016, the New World Translation of the Holy Scriptures was released by Jehovah's Witnesses as a complete Bible translation in Tamil. This replaced the earlier partial translation comprising only the New Testament. It was published online with mobile versions released through JW Library application in App stores.

== Current status ==
The Tamil Bible is undergoing first re-editing with archaic renderings being replaced with modern equivalent. The work is almost complete and computer keying-in of the text will be taken up shortly. A fresh Common Language translation of the Tamil Bible was brought out in the year 1995. The same has been in circulation now though not widely distributed. This text is undergoing revision for correcting mistakes including typographical errors.
