= Anbinnagaram =

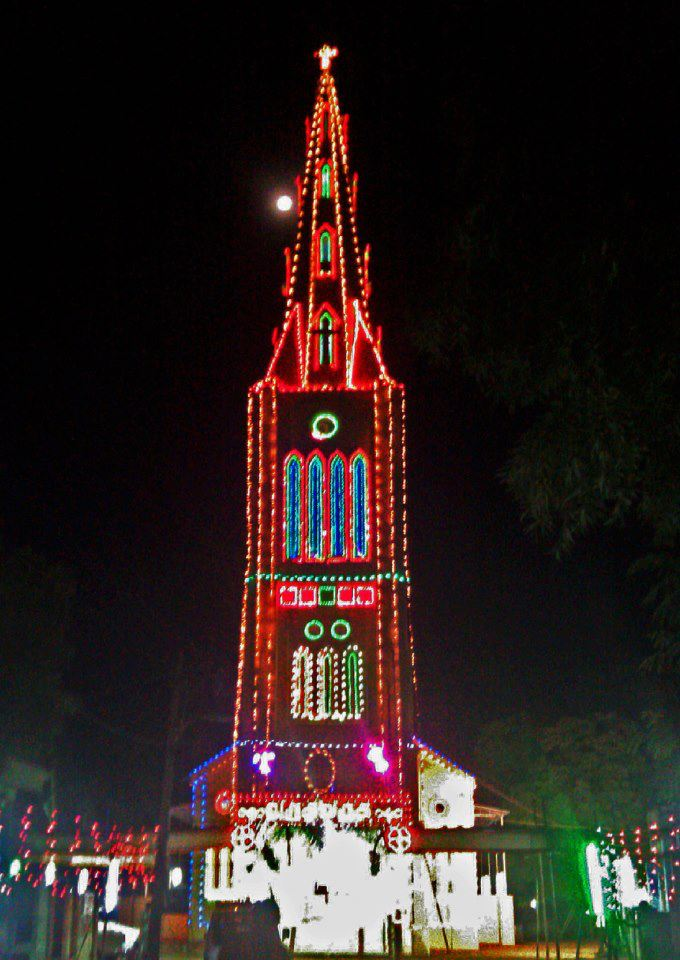
Christ Church, Anbinnagaram

Anbinnagaram is a small village of Tuticorin district in Sattankulam Taluk, South Indian state of Tamil Nadu. The village postal code (pincode) is 628702.

Established by Rev. C. T. E. Rhenius (The Apostle of Tirunelveli). One small river named 'Karumeni aaru' passes through the east side of this village.

== History ==
During the 18th century, Christian missionaries in Tirunelveli region had witnessed persecution of converts coinciding with the Polygar War, by clubmen from the state of Ramanathapuram. To protect the new converts, Sundaranandam David, a disciple of Rev. C. F. Schwartz, established a Christian satellite village - called Mudhalur, meaning First Village - near Sathankulam, which served as a refuge for local Christians. Following the Mudalur pattern, Rev. Charles Rhenius started several Christian satellite villages, including Neduvilai (later known as Megnanapuram), Idayankulam, Asirvathapuram, Nallur, Surandai, Nallammaalpuram (Idaichivilai), Anbinnagaram, and several other small villages.
