= Benjamin Schultze =

German missionary and orientalist

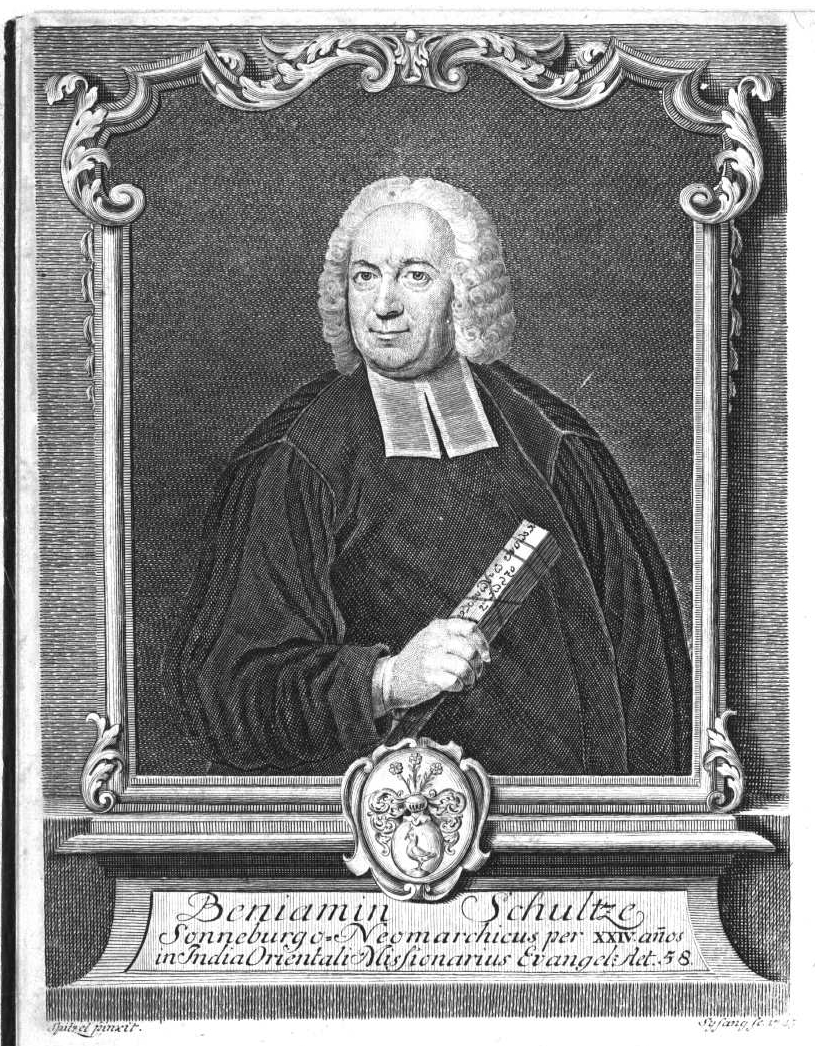

Benjamin Schultze (1689–1760) was a Christian missionary of the Danish-Halle Mission in South India who established the first Christian mission in Madras.

== Biography ==
Born in Sonnenburg in Brandenburg, Benjamin Schultze studied at Halle, then was sent in 1719 as a missionary of the Danish mission of Tranquebar. He moved to Madras in 1726 and was supported by the Society for Promoting Christian Knowledge in London, thus becoming the first member of what came to be known as the English mission. He, along with Peter Maleiappen (1700–1739), worked on the translation of the Bible into Tamil. The Biographical Dictionary of Christian Missions records that he completed Ziegenbelg's translation of the Bible into Tamil (first printed in 1728) and continued with a New Testament in Telugu. He also first translated part of Genesis into the southern form of Hindi or Hindustani (Dakkhini), which was printed at Halle in Arabic characters in 1745, followed by Psalms, Gospels, and Epistles.

He returned to Halle in 1743 where he undertook the direction of the orphanage of the Foundation Francke.

== Works ==
He left, among other works:

- Grammatica telugica , a grammar of Telugu (1728, published in 1984).
- Orientalisch- und occidentalischer Sprachmeister (Leipzig, 1738), containing 100 alphabets, polyglot tables, number names and Sunday prayer in 200 languages or dialects.
- Grammatica hindostanica , a grammar of the Hindustani (Halle, 1745).

== See also ==
- Bible translations into Hindi and Urdu
- Bible translations into Tamil
- List of Protestant missionaries in India
