= John Parsons (missionary) =

John Parsons (1817–1869) was an English Baptist missionary to India and reviser of William Carey's Hindi Bible. He came to India with his wife Jane, whom he married in 1840, to join his brother George and his wife, Sophia at Monghyr. George's health, however, had been poor in the country and he died a week prior to their arrival in November. Sophia Parsons returned, permanently, to England in 1842. Parsons died at Monghyr in 1869.
