= List of Catholic missionaries in India =

The following list refer to list of Roman Catholic missionaries in India.

== Early missionaries ==
- Thomas the Apostle
- St. Francis Xavier
- Giacomo Fenicio
- Roberto de Nobili
- John Marignolli

== Roman Catholic missionaries ==
These include:

- Jordan Catala
- Giovanni de' Marignolli alias John De Marignolli
- Roberto de Nobili
- St. Francis Xavier (1506–52)
- Matheus de Castro (1594–1677)
- Thomas de Castro (d. 1684)
- Ephrem de Nevers (d. 1695)
- John de Brito (d. 1647–1693)
- Joseph Vaz (1651–1711)
- Costantino Giuseppe Beschi (1680–1747)
- Mother Teresa (1910–1997)
- Mary Glowrey (1887-1957)
- Jim Borst (1932-2018)

== See also ==
- List of Protestant missionaries in India
- Mission (Christian)
- Christianity in India
