= Samuel Martin (missionary) =

American 19th-century Presbyterian missionary

Samuel Martin (1825–1910) was an American Presbyterian missionary in Punjab from 1866 to 1910. Martin played a pivotal role in establishing Martinpur, a predominantly Christian village in today's Punjab.

== Life ==
Samuel and Lydia Martin, Midwesterners with agricultural roots, travelled to India, joining a cohort of Presbyterian missionaries. They settled in Punjab Province (British India) and now within modern-day Pakistan. Martin lived with his family for several years in Sialkot. He played an important role in converting disadvantaged people in society, especially those considered untouchables, but also Hindu, and Muslim landowners. (Note: During the colonial period, particularly in Punjab, various Christian missions, such as the United Presbyterian Mission, the Church of Scotland, and the Church Mission Society, actively pursued strategies of mass conversion, embedding their evangelical efforts within broader socio-cultural and institutional frameworks of the time.)

He was the first to baptise someone from this group and is said to have baptised several thousand of people around Narowal. Beyond evangelism, Martin also took an active interest in supporting the resettlement and integration of these new converts into society.

Following Lydia’s death in 1886, Samuel, undeterred, carried forward their shared vision, continuing the mission alongside his children with quiet perseverance and enduring commitment.

== Establishment of Martinpur ==
In 1898, Martin purchased land near a canal, later known as Martinpur. He selected 72 families from various parts of Punjab to settle in this new village, creating a community centred around Christian values and education. Martinpur quickly developed as a significant centre for the Christian population in the region.

== Contributions ==
Martin started the Christian Boys High School in Martinpur. Even though the school faced challenges, it was returned to the Presbyterian Education Board in 1998. Since then, the school has improved and has seen more students join and perform well in their studies. Over the years, the Christian Boys High School has educated more than 14,000 boys.

His two daughters, Emma Josephine Martin and Mary Rachel Martin, who were raised in Punjab, later made significant contributions to the field of education. Emma Josephine held leadership roles in advancing women's education, led the girls' school in Pathankot, she also taught at the prestigious Kinnaird College for Women in Lahore.

Samuel Martin was also known for his contributions to the development of Urdu metrical psalms, supporting efforts to make Christian liturgy more accessible to local congregations.
