= Henry Bower =

Reverend Henry Bower (1812–1885) was an Anglo-Indian missionary of the Society of the Propagation of the Gospel who was known for his scholarship over Tamil.

== Early life ==
Bower was born in 1812 in an Anglo-Indian family in Madras. He was educated at the Vepery (formerly Veperi) seminary. After completing his schooling, he was employed as a catechist by the Wesleyan Missionary Society. In 1838, he was appointed Assistant Missionary in the Madras mission.

Bower was ordained deacon in 1843 and priest in 1845. Bower preached at Tanjore from 1844 to 1846, Vediarpuram from 1846 to 1857, Madras from 1857 to 1875 and 1878 to 1884 and Kumbakonam from 1875 to 1878.

== Writings ==
At an early stage in his life, Bower attained mastery over Tamil. He was the principal Tamil examiner of the University of Madras. Bower translated Tom Butler's anthology, Pearson on the Creed, a Biblical and Theological Dictionary, Lectures on the Moral Law, the History of Christianity in India, and other works into Tamil. He revised the Tamil Bible with the assistance of E. Sundaram Pillai, an Indian Christian.

== Death ==
Bower retired in 1884 and was given a pension. He died in 1885 at Palayamkottai (formerly Palayankottah).
