= Megnanapuram =

Megnanapuram Neduvillai Meignanapuram
- Village Panchayat
- Megnanapuram
- Location in Tamil Nadu, India Megnanapuram (India)
- Coordinates: 8°28′N 77°59′E
- Country: India
- State: Tamil Nadu
- District: Thoothukudi
- Founder: C. T. E. Rhenius

Area
  - Total: 4.7964 km^{2} (1.8519 sq mi)
  - Density: 535/km^{2} (1,390/sq mi)

Languages
  - Official: Tamil
- Time zone: UTC+5:30 (IST)
- PIN: 628210
- Vehicle registration: TN 92, TN 69
- Nearest city: Tiruchendur
- Lok Sabha constituency: Thoothukudi
- Avg. Summer Temperature: 41 °C (106 °F)
- Avg. winter temperature: 28 °C (82 °F)

Megnanapuram (Neduvilai) lies in the southern side of Thoothukudi District, at about 10 km east of Sathankulam and 11 km south of Nazareth. This village is also known as Meignanapuram. Udangudi is the nearest town. The nearest railway is Nazareth Railway Station. It is served by Thoothukudi Airport. By road, it is accessible from Tirunelveli (41 km north-west), Thoothukudi and Nagercoil.

== Demographics ==
According to 2011 Census of India, information the location code or village code of Megnanapuram village is 642581. Megnanapuram village is located in Tiruchendur Taluk of Thoothukudi District in Tamil Nadu, India. It is situated 15 km away from sub-district headquarter Tiruchendur and 65 km away from district headquarter Thoothukudi. As per 2009 stats, Megnanapuram is the gram panchayat of Megnanapuram village.

The total geographical area of village is 479.64 hectares. Megnanapuram has a total population of 2,502 peoples. There are about 649 houses in Megnanapuram village. Udankudi is nearest town to Megnanapuram.

=== Population ===
Census Parameter	Census Data
Total Population	2502
Total No of Houses	649
Female Population %	52.4 % ( 1311)
Total Literacy rate %	86.3 % ( 2160)
Female Literacy rate	44.9 % ( 1124)
Scheduled Tribes Population %	0.0 % ( 0)
Scheduled Caste Population %	3.6 % ( 90)
Working Population %	34.7 %
Child(0 -6) Population by 2011	231
Girl Child(0 -6) Population % by 2011	47.2 % ( 109)

== History ==
Megnanapuram is a village which came under the influence of Rev. C. T. E. Rhenius. On 7 March 1830, Rhenius changed the name of the village "Neduvilai" into "Meignanapuram" (True Wisdom). Rev. John Thomas took the village to his heart and designed the church, which is a must for any visitor to Tirunelveli. The imposing steeple, 192 ft high, was added in 1868, the coping stone being fixed by Lord Napier. Rev. John Thomas was buried in a corner of the church. Every year, in the month of January's last Thursday, the "Asana Pandigai" is celebrated. The Village people celebrate the Church Festival in the memory of Apostle St. Paul. At this time, relatives of the villagers and visitors attend this, used exceeding one lakh people of attendance. Mass amounts of food is prepared and served at the time. The Rev. C. T. E. Rhenius Chapel which is located in Elliott Tuxford Girls Higher Secondary School was renovated in 2019. This renovation helped the chapel reflect the English age old beauty along with a new age touch.

== Economy ==
Agriculture is the major source of livelihood for the people here. The west ayacut irrigation (Sadaneri Kalvai) is the only source of irrigation.

As education is very accessible, the generations of Teachers are living in Megnanapuram. Most of them were working in Government Aided Schools.

People from this village have been working in every tires of Government Departments in State Government and Union Government as well.

In this village, one can get the professionals like IT Professionals, Building Construction, Music Professions, Choir, Orchestra, Event Management, Driving, Cooking, and Electrical Works.

It has The Meg Park residential A/C rooms hotel with party hall for quality stay and functional gathering.

== Education ==
Megnanapuram has separate Government Aided Institutions, Primary Schools and Higher Secondary Schools for boys and girls. An English Nursery School for both gender and also a Teacher Education College for Girls in the name of Rev. John Thomas. Along with a Private Trust based Higher Secondary School.

=== Primary Schools ===
- TDTA Boys Primary School
- TDTA Girls Primary School
- Eliott Tuxford Nursery and Primary School (English School)

=== Government Aided Higher Secondary School ===
- Ambrose Higher Secondary School (Boys)
- Elliot Tuxford Girls Higher Secondary School (Girls)

=== Trust Based School ===
- Esther Santham Higher Secondary School

=== College ===
- Rev. John Thomas College of Education for Girls

== Sports ==
Megnanapuram is mainly known for its Sporting Gene. It's producing generations of sports players in all sports and games. Here, Kabaddi, Volleyball, Ball Badminton, Football, Cycling, Cricket clubs are present. The primary sports Club which is very famous is Rev. John Thomas Kabaddi Club. It produces lot of national Kabaddi players all over India. 1995 Arjuna Awardee P. Ganesan also a part this club, who is the friend of below mentioned J. Ravi Sundar.

Some of the Famous Kabaddi Players are,

- Mr. J Jeyapaul
- Mr. I. Devapitchai Asirvatham, TNSTC
- Mr. J. Ravi Sundar, TNEB
- Mr. J. Ganesan, ICF
- Mr. D. Vinoth Paulyas, India Post

=== List of Sports Clubs ===
Most of the Sports Clubs are in the Name of Rev. John Thomas.

- Rev. John Thomas Kabaddi Club
- Rev. John Thomas Volleyball Club
- Rev. John Thomas Ball Badminton Club
- Rev. John Thomas Football Club
- Rev. John Thomas Cricket Club
- Rev. John Thomas Cycling Club
- Walsh Sports Club (Athletics & Marathon)
