= H. U. Weitbrecht =

British Anglican missionary

- Born: Herbert Udny Weitbrecht Stanton; 24 January 1851; London, England
- Died: 30 May 1937 (aged 86)
- Education: University of Tübingen (Ph.D)
- Occupation: Anglican missionary
- Known for: Church Missionary Society in India
- Spouse: Ellen Louise Stanton (m. 1876; died 1884)
- Parents: Johann Jakob Weitbrecht (aka John James Weitbrecht) (father); Martha Edwards (mother)

Herbert Udny Weitbrecht Stanton (/ˈwɪdni/; 24 January 1851 – 30 May 1937) was a British Anglican missionary. He was born to the German missionary, Johann Jakob Weitbrecht, and his wife, Martha Edwards, in London, England. His father was working in India at the time of his birth, and known in English as John James Weitbrecht.

Weitbrecht's wife's maiden name was Stanton; this could be the reason he added it to his own name later in life, possibly to please her family.

== Church Missionary Society Career ==
He received his Ph.D. from the University of Tübingen in 1873. A few years later at age 25 he joined the Church Missionary Society. In 1874 he was ordained as a deacon, and then as a priest the following year by the Bishop of Chester. When he offered himself for ministry in the Church Missionary Society, he was sent to India to be the Vice Principal of St. John's Divinity College in Lahore. From this time on he spent 35 years in Central Panjab (see Punjab region).

In 1879 and 1880 he was the acting secretary of Punjab Corresponding Committee for CMS. Eight years later he became the examining Chaplain to the Bishop of Lahore. He was also appointed honorary Canon of Lahore. He was also appointed the Chief Reviser of the Urdu New Testament during the 1890s when a fresh translation was being prepared.

== Central Board of Study for preparation of Missionaries ==
In 1911 Weitbrecht resigned from the CMS and was appointed to the secretaryship of the Central Board of Study for preparation of Missionaries. Two years later as the secretary he published A Bibliography for Missionary Students. While on the board he was also a member of the Candidates Committee. Weitbrecht was appointed the director of Mildmay Institutions in 1915. The next year he was appointed as James Long Lecturer on Islam. A number of his articles have also been published in the Church Missionary Intelligencer.

== Family life ==
When Herbert was born his father was still in India so he was not there for the birth. In 1876, he married Ellen Louise Stanton. They were married for 8 years before she died at Bury St. Edmunds on 18 January 1884. Weitbrecht's daughter, Winifred Margaret Weitbrecht, married an education missionary in the Punjab, Arthur Cecil Clarke.

== Writings ==
Weitbrecht published A Bibliography for Missionary Students in 1913. In 1914, Weitbrecht was invited to take up literary work at home that mostly included works on the Mohammedan controversy. His first work was Raymond Lull and Six Centuries of Islam was published in 1915. Ramon Llull is described by Weitbrecht as the one man in the Middle Ages that gave his live to preaching Christ to the Moslems out of love and with much knowledge.

Two major works were published in 1919, The Teaching of the Qur'an and The Gospel According to St. Matthew. Weitbrecht's writings have also been published in many journals and compiled works. S.M. Zwemer published articles by Weitbrecht in two of his books, the first The Mohammedan World of Today 1906 contains Weitbrecht's "The New Islam in India," referring to the movement founded by Sir Syed Ahmed Khan of Aligarh. Weitbrecht analyzed this "New Islam" in detail and its impact in India and on the Christian community there. Zwemer's book Islam and Missions published in 1911 contains "Reform Movements in India" by Weitbrecht. He also played a major part in translating Modern Doubt and Christian Belief by Theodore Christlieb who is also Weitbrecht's brother-in-law, from German to English.

- Modern Doubt and Christian Belief: A Series of Apologetic Lectures Addressed to Earnest Seekers After Truth, together with Theodor Christlieb and Thomas Luck Kingsbury (Hrsg), T & T Clark, 1877
- A Descriptive Catalogue of Urdu Christian Literature: With a Review of the Same and a Supplementary Catalogue of Christian Publications in the Other Languages of the Panjab, Religious tract society, 1886
- The Urdu New Testament : a history of its language and its versions, British and Foreign Bible Society, London, 1900
- Zwemer, S.M. and E.M. Wherry. The Mohammedan World of Today 1906. New York: The Young People's Missionary Movement, 1906.
- A bibliography for missionary students, Anderson and Ferrier, Edinburgh 1913
- Raymond Lull and Six Centuries of Islam, Society for Promoting Christian Knowledge, London 1915, new Edition by Biblobazaar, 2009 ISBN 1-113-13687-1
- The Gospel According to St. Matthew, Society for Promoting Christian Knowledge, London 1919, new Edition by BiblioBazaar 2009 ISBN 1-117-45613-7
- The Teaching of the Qur’an with an Account of Its Growth and a Subjekt Index, 1919, new Edition by NabuPress, 2009 ISBN 978-1-151-44591-9
- Selections from the Qur’an, Übersetzung von John Medows Rodwell, Society for Promoting Christian Knowledge, London 1922, Neuauflage bei Kessinger Publishing, 2010 ISBN 978-1-120-86582-3
- Texts for Students, 1922, new Edition by NabuPress, 2012 ISBN 978-1-276-24361-2
