= Joyce M. Woollard =

English missionary in India

Sister Joyce M. Woollard
- Church: Church of South India

Personal details
- Born: 1923
- Died: 1997 (aged 73–74)
- Denomination: Protestantism

Sister Joyce Mansfield Woollard (1923–1997) was a missionary who served with the London Missionary Society / C.W.M. in the Anglican Diocese of Coimbatore of the Church of South India from 1948 and at Vishranthi Nilayam, Bangalore from 1988.

== Biography ==
Sister Woollard came to India on November 12, 1948. She was in the language school in 1949. She joined the order of sisters when it was started in 1952 as a Probationer, in St. Mark's Cathedral, Bangalore.

She worked in villages around Kodumudi and Erode, travelling by bicycle. She maintained the contacts made during the evangelistic work in the villages, later when she worked in various capacities in Erode and Salem, Tamil Nadu.

She was the convener of the Women’s Work Committee, the Hostel and Boarding Homes Committee, and the Creche Committee. She was the correspondent of Elementary Schools in Erode, Hobart School in Salem, and Senior Citizens' Homes in Athur, Thoothukudi. She was a member of the Diocesan Executive Committee, Secretary and Treasurer of the Women's Fellowship of Coimbatore Diocese and of the Order for Women.

After retirement, she came to Vishranthi Nilayam as the warden in service of the order and the Mother House of the order for women. She died in 1997.
