= Baring Baring-Gould =

Christian missionary to the Far East

The Reverend Baring Baring-Gould
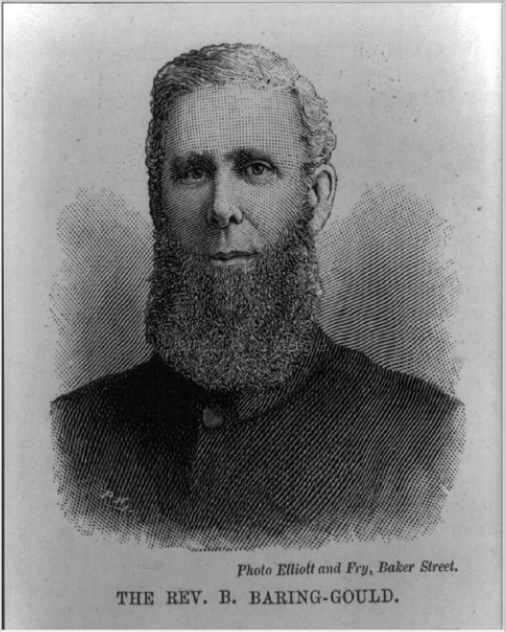
- The Rev. B. Baring-Gould in 1895

Personal details
- Born: 1842
- Died: 1917 (aged 74–75)
- Denomination: Anglican
- Children: Elizabeth Baring-Gould
- Occupation: Missionary(Education, Medical, Religion)
- Education: Corpus Christi College, Cambridge

Baring Baring-Gould was a late 19th and early 20th century Anglican missionary who is known for his work in China and India overseeing and reporting on all sites. He began his missionary work in the UK working for the Church Mission Society (CMS) straight out of schooling. Traveling abroad for the first time in 1899, Baring-Gould was sent to oversee the progress of missions across the “Far East” (India, China, Japan) and report his findings back to the CMS. Appointed as the CMS secretary of Far East and India missions, Baring-Gould's daughter, Edith Baring-Gould, accompanied her father on these missions and recorded their findings and opinions. Deeply rooted in the CMS organization, Baring-Gould was a key member to organizational and especially faith related aspects of mission projects.

== Early life and education ==
Baring-Gould was born in 1842 and died at the age of 74 in 1917. Through the CMS, he worked alongside his daughter, Edith Baring-Gould, for many years. Baring-Gould graduated Corpus Christi College at Cambridge in 1865 and immediately began his work with the CMS.

== Mission ==
=== Work with the CMS ===
In 1869, Baring-Gould was appointed incumbent reverend of All Saints’ church in Sidmouth, U.K. and in 1878 transferred to St. Michael and All Angels church in Blackheath, U.K. After 10 years at Blackheath, he joined the staff of CMS in Salisbury Square.

=== Call ===
Baring-Gould's calling to missionary work was driven from religious Christian affiliations. Baring-Gould described his internal conflict between prioritizing education or promoting Christianity. Baring-Gould celebrated colleges opening in various Chinese cities as evidence of the progress of westernizing the education system in China. Baring-Gould weighed the impact of taking over these colleges and making them institutions that promoted Christianity rather than allowing them to exist independently in China (still utilizing the Westernized education systems that were enforced by the CMS missionaries). Baring-Gould's desire to create sustainable institutions for westernized education in China contrasted with his personal interest in spreading Christianity. Although he regularly proposed sending Christian missionaries to teach at these newly established schools and colleges to promote Christianity among Chinese students, Baring-Gould understood the importance of implementing sustainable institutions that could exist without foreign aid and personnel.

=== Journey and service ===
==== Edith Baring-Gould's journals ====
Baring-Gould's missionary work is understood through the writings of his daughter and fellow missionary, Edith Baring-Gould (widely known as E.B.G.). She documented their missionary experience in Japan through a series of journal articles, describing Japanese culture and norms through the eyes of a westernized Christian. Edith Baring-Gould was introduced to missionary work when young through her father's participation in the CMS. They shared very similar values in terms of the place Christianity held in missionary work. As an appointed secretary of the India and Far East CMS sponsored missions, her accounts of these missions (on which she traveled to support her father's work) a good sense of their thoughts and opinions regarding the importance of Christianity in their work.

==== India ====
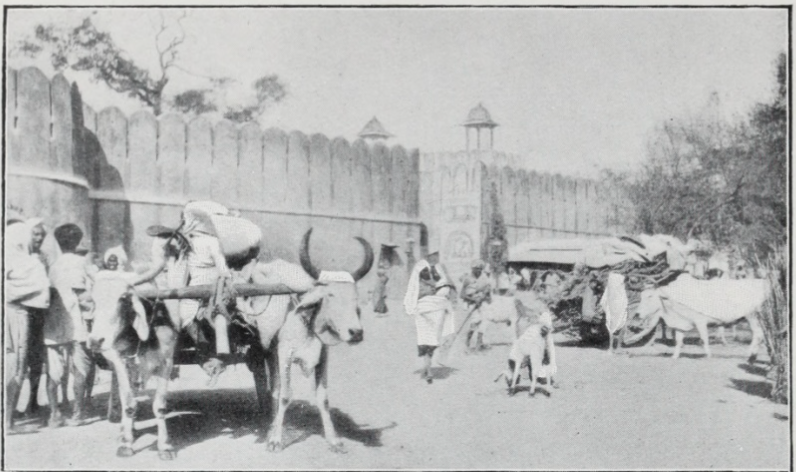
Jeypore Wall, Rajputana, India

Baring-Gould's first mission focused heavily on India, contemplating his efforts to cause a mass conversion to Christianity. On December 6, 1899, Baring-Gould (along with his daughter, Edith Baring-Gould) left with other missionaries for India. He arrived in Bombay on December 16, 1899, and spent a few weeks traveling to different CMS sponsored mission locations. The Baring-Goulds' purpose in India was not specific to one mission project but instead related to many projects in the region.

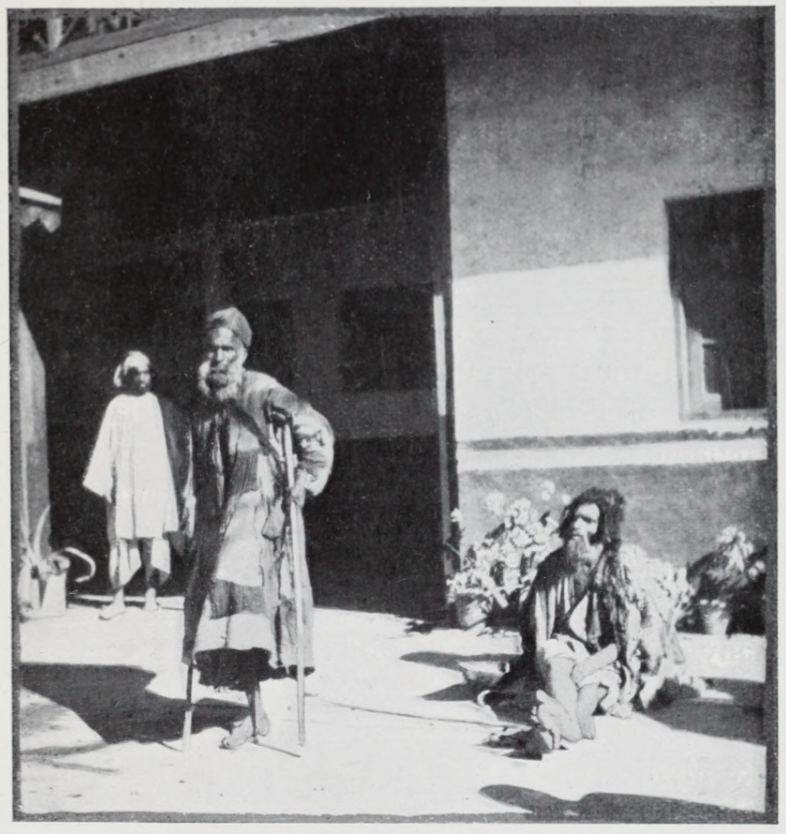
Outpatients at Hospital in India -- photo taken by Edith Baring-Gould

During their time in India, the Baring-Goulds reported on projects such as the Robert Money School in Bombay as well as other schools and churches in Jeypore (the capital of the Native State of Rajputana). In her recount of their travels in India, Edith Baring-Gould focused on their time in Jandiala, overseeing the CMS medical mission piloted by an Indian Christian doctor who opened a small hospital. Edith Baring-Gould described the physical condition of the patients, from a multitude of diseases to blindness, and everything in between. However, instead of focusing on the physical aid that the hospital provided (which she admits was beneficial to physical health), E.B.G. chose to describe the healing of souls due to exposure to Christianity. Baring-Gould expressed his belief that it is more of a blessing to help the patients understand the healing process of God and the Bible than to help their physical state.

==== China ====
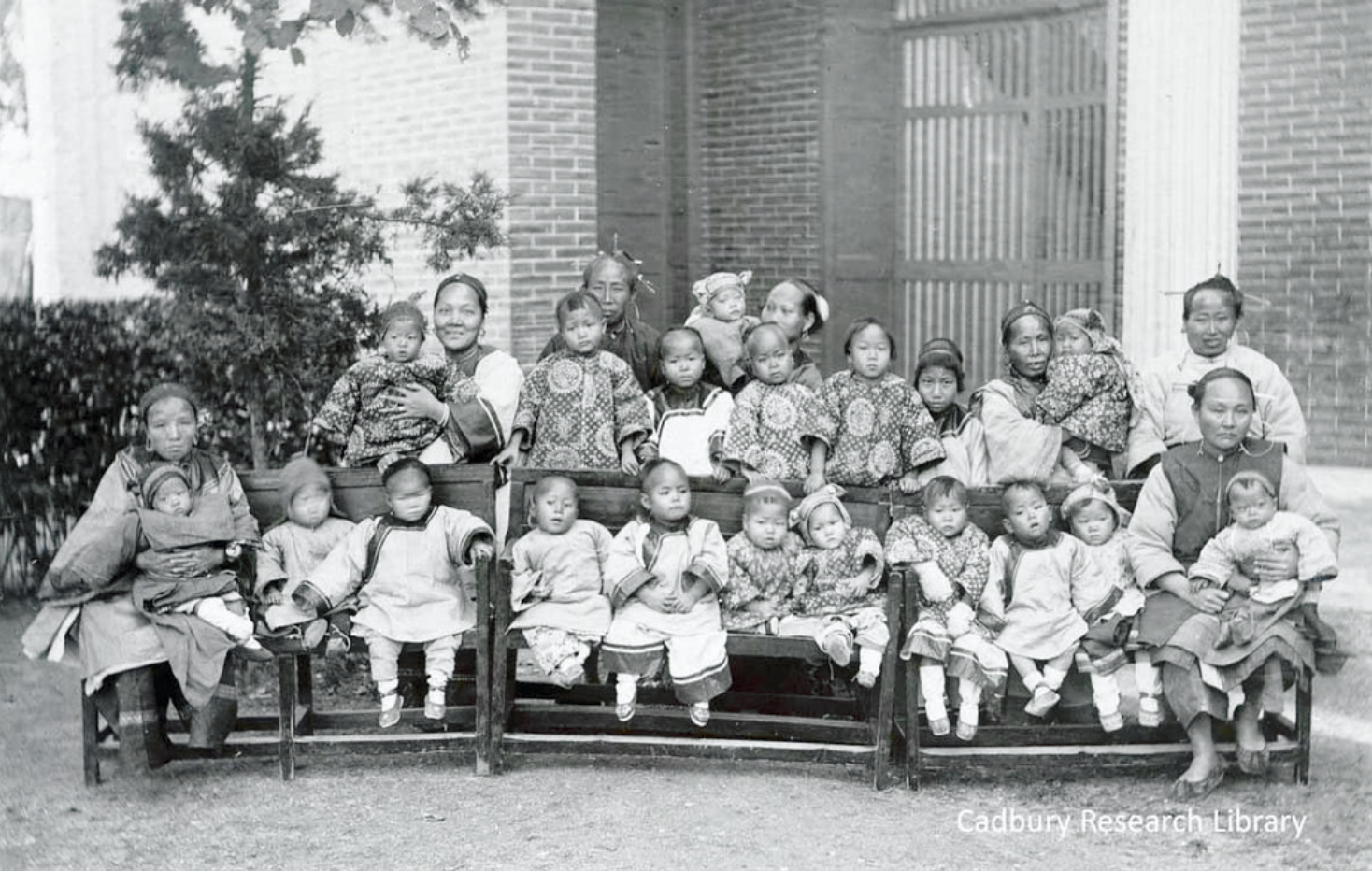
Women and Children Photographed by Edith Baring-Gould during the time she spent doing missionary work in China with Baring Baring-Gould

After his time in India, Baring-Gould visited missions worldwide on behalf of the CMS. He quickly became a crucial figure among the CMS staff and acquired a secretary position focusing on various significant mission projects. He also journeyed to China to oversee a massive effort to westernize education systems in China. During his time in China, Baring-Gould documented his cultural observations, missionary efforts, and personal opinions. The article “The Position in the Far East” focused on the education reform efforts of missionaries in China. Convinced that Chinese populations were in desperate need of a westernized education system, Baring-Gould argued that westernized education was in fact eagerly sought after in the place of the already existing education that focused on the teachings of Confucius. Baring-Gould described the missionaries’ efforts to obtain the Chinese Government's support for their endeavors by illustrating the system in which Chinese governors pledged to open preparatory schools in their respective provincial capitals. The missionaries encouraged the government to enforce laws that all boys older than eight years of age were required to attend school. Baring-Gould commented that the implementation of a westernized education system was so well received by Chinese populations that families began wanting their daughters to attend school and men became more interested in marrying women who were considered educated from the western system.
