= Holy Trinity Cathedral, Palayamkottai =

Holy Trinity Cathedral
- தூய திரித்துவ பேராலயம்
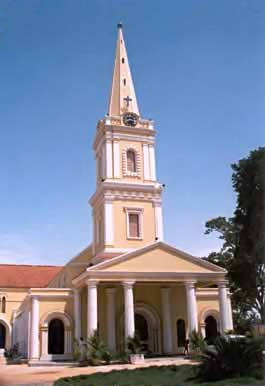
- Holy Trinity Cathedral
- 8.726513°N 77.727067°E
- Location: Palayamkottai
- Country: India

Architecture
- Architect: C. T. E. Rhenius
- Architectural type: UK 1820s
- Completed: 1826

Administration
- District: Tirunelveli, Tamil Nadu

Holy Trinity Cathedral is the cathedral church of Tirunelveli Diocese under Church of South India. Marvellous Church Crafted with the help of God.

== Bishops of the CSI Tirunelveli Diocese ==
- Samuel Morley 1896–1903
- Arthur A Williams 1905–1914
- Harry M Waller 1915–1923
- Norman H Tubbs 1923–1928
- Frederick J Western 1929–1938
- Stephen C Neill 1939–1944 (Founder of Bishopric – CSI Tirunelveli Diocese)
- George T Selwyn 1945–1952
- Augustine G Jebaraj 1953–1970 (First Indian bishop – CSI Tirunelveli Diocese)
- Thomas S Garrett 1971–1974
- S Daniel Abraham 1975–1984
- Jason S Dharmaraj 1985–1999
- Jeyapaul David 1999–2009
- JJ Christhudoss 2009–2021
- ARGST Barnabas 2021 - Till now

== Images ==
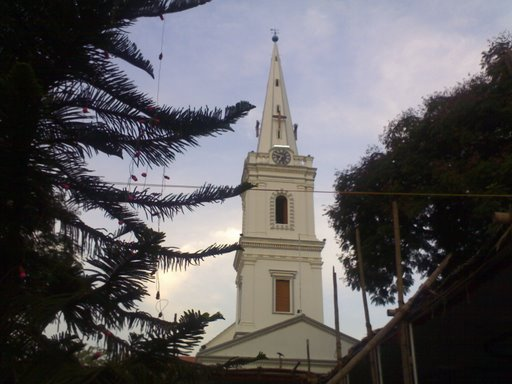
Steeple

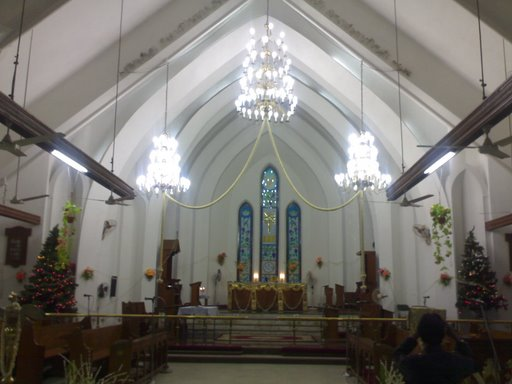
High Altar

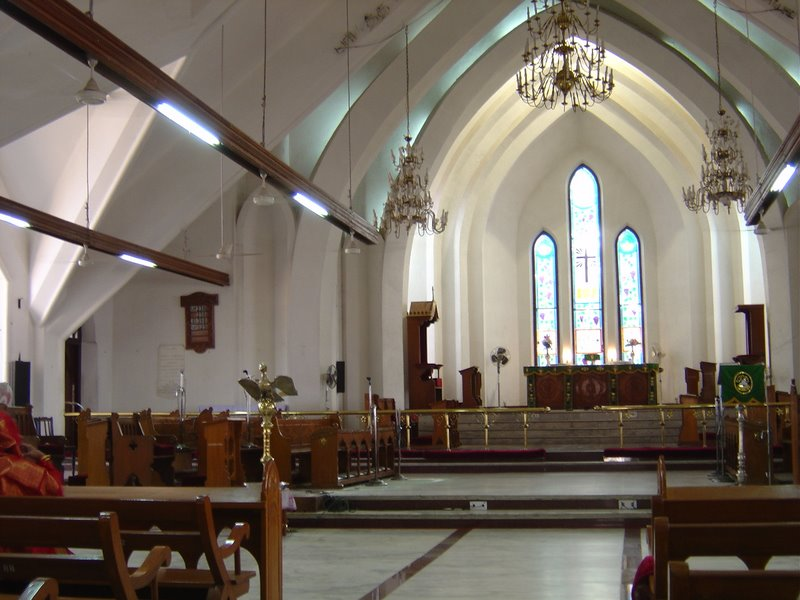
Interior

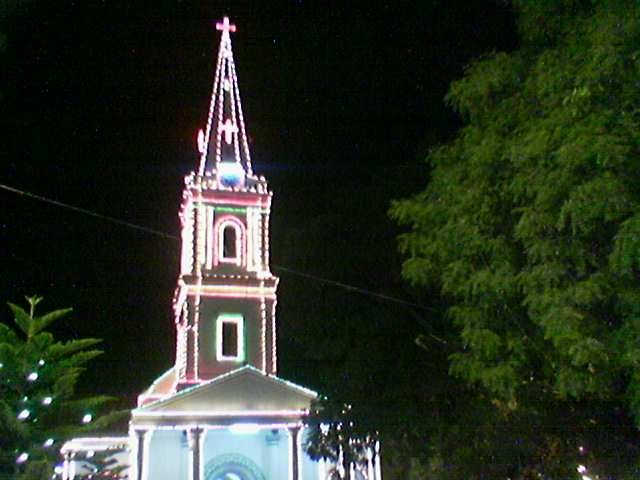
Decorated in lights

== See also ==
- Church of South India
- Tirunelveli Diocese of the Church of South India

== Notes ==
R Joseph served as the senior pastor of Holy Trinity cathedral from 1987 to 1992. A Dhanapaul Devaraj serving as Cathechist from 2010
