= C. T. E. Rhenius =

German-born missionary (1790–1838)

Charles Theophilus Ewald Rhenius (5 November 1790 – 5 June 1838) was a German-born missionary of the Church Mission Society (CMS). He was the first CMS missionary to arrive at India. For his missionary work in the Tirunelveli district he came to be known as the "Apostle of Tirunelveli". He was involved in the attempt to revise the Fabricius version of the Tamil Bible and also published a Tamil grammar book. Rhenius split from the Anglican Church in 1830 and started his own congregation. Rhenius' work was recognized in 1980 by the Reverend Daniel Abraham, the then Church of South India (CSI) bishop of Tirunelveli diocese. Rhenius's work was given official recognition by the Anglican Communion during the Tirunelveli diocese bicentenary celebration in 1980, in which, all the bishops, including Anglican bishop Stephen Neill and all the presbyters took an oath in front of the tomb of Rev Rhenius to follow the path of the resting soul, regard to evangelism.

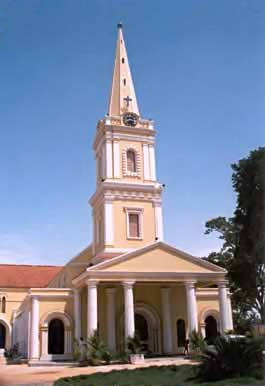
Holy Trinity Cathedral, Palayamkottai, Tirunelveli - Built by Rev. C.T.E. Rhenius

== Early life ==
Charles Rhenius was the second son of Otto Gottlieb Nikolaus Rhenius, an officer in the Prussian army. When Charles was six years old, his father died. Charles left school when he was fourteen and went to work in his uncle’s office. After he had worked for three years another uncle called him to come and live with him. This uncle was a rich landowner. There were many missionary magazines in his uncle’s house. As he read these, Charles felt God was calling him to go overseas as a missionary. Though his uncle was unhappy about his decision, he accepted it. But his aunt tried to get him to change his mind. Charles had to struggle in prayer to overcome the temptation. As his uncle had no children, he planned to leave all his property to Charles. Rhenius went to Berlin to study theology at the first German missionary college of Johannes Jaenicke. When he left home he did not dare to tell his family of his final plans. When his suspicious mother Catharina Dorothea Schiemann, implored him not to go overseas, Rhenius replied "Dear mother, what am I to do if the Lord should so order it?. After a year at the seminary Charles Rhenius was ordained as a Lutheran presbyter.

== With the Church Mission Society ==
In the early 19th century, the Church Mission Society was looking for missionaries for Dr John’s Schools of the Danish Mission at Tharangambadi in India. Among those who came forward, Rhenius and Schnarre were selected and given orientation on mission skills for 18 months in England. In 1813, the British parliament passed a new Act. This Act allowed missionaries freedom to enter India. Both could get a berth on a ship only in February 1814. At the last minute his family tried to stop Rhenius going to India. His brother appealed to him by writing that their mother was weeping for him. CMS arranged a farewell meeting for him that was attended by more than 2,000 people.

Rhenius's journey to India was eventful: he experienced a fire aboard the ship and it was almost wrecked near Maldives. They reached safely Madras, only to learn that Dr John, under whose aegis they had planned to work as missionaries, was dead. Rhenius and Schnarre managed to stay for two weeks with the chaplain of the British East India Company in Madras. Then they went to Tharangambadi to learn the Tamil language.

== Missionary work in Madras ==
After five months of language training, Rhenius was asked to come back to Madras, as CMS had decided to engage him in their own mission called Mission in Madras, instead of helping the Danish Mission at Tharangambadi. The Madras Governor gave permission to work in the Black Town of Madras. They rented a house belonging to a Hindu. This facilitated to study the Hindu scriptures and he visited the Kanchipuram temple as well. Through his studies, Rhenius came to believe that Hindus had once believed in one supreme god and the current polytheism was a later development. He fashioned his proselytizing method according to the belief - by appealing Hindus to go back to monotheism and the worship of Jesus Christ. He started a school in the Black Town, Madras. When the Hindus in Kanchipuram invited him to start a school, he agreed. After starting several schools in Madras, he extended his missionary work to Palmaner and Vandavasi, where he was exposed to the religious doctrines of Jainism. During his travel he recorded in his diary that the caste Hindus did not allow him to enter their house and on one occasion he had to spend the night in a cow shed.

In 1815, the Bible Society in Calcutta decided to revise the Johann Phillip Fabricius version of the Tamil Bible. Rhenius was asked to help with the revision. Assisted by a Munshi he set to work on the revision. On his travels Rhenius had talked with many Hindus. He found that very often they could not understand the Bible translation of Fabricius. Further a conversation with a Brahmin showed what great care was needed in translating the idiomatic expressions. They were discussing Matthew 3:7, "you snakes..". The Brahmin had taken the words literally - he thought the people had really turned into snakes. This made Rhenius realize that a revision of the Bible was not sufficient - a new translation was necessary. He began a new translation of the New Testament. When he showed his translation to his Hindu friends, they had said that they could understand his translation. He wrote down some principles of translation. Thous his ideas on translation were not accepted in his time, they are similar to the current ones followed by the Bible Society. On 5 November 1817, a group of Protestants, Roman Catholics and Hindus met in Madras and formed the Tamil Bible Association. Rhenius also wrote a work of Tamil grammar titled "A Grammar of the Tamil Language: With Appendix", which was published by the American Mission Press at Madras in 1859.

== Family ==
On 7 March 1816, Rhenius married 15 year old, Anna Wilhelmina Van Someren, at Fort St. George, Madras. The daughter of merchant, T.C. Van Someren Vryenes, and his wife Susanna Emilia. Charles and Anna had fourteen children together, including his eldest son, the Rev. Joshua Rhenius (1818 - 1878), who compiled a memoir of his father, published in 1841. Anna outlived her husband by 36 years, dying in Bangalore in 1874.

== Missionary work in Tirunelveli ==
In 1816, the historian, the Reverend James Hough, was the chaplain to the English garrison in the Palayamkottai fort and cantonment. He was interested in village ministry and wrote to the CMS asking for a missionary. By this time, the differences of opinion between Rhenius and the Madras Committee of the CMS had grown greatly. Rhenius was at the point of resigning and going home. However, the CMS did not want to lose a skilled missionary and suggested that he could go to Palayamkottai to assist Hough. Rhenius arrived in Tirunelveli on 7 July 1820. The first CMS congregation in Palayamkottai (present day Holy Trinity Cathedral, Palayamkottai) came into existence on 10 March 1822 and adjutant (current venue of Cathedral Higher Secondary School, Palayamkottai) to the CMS Church, Murugankuruchi, Rhenius started the Palamcottah Preparandi Institution. In 1824, he purchased valuable property to the north of the High Road in Palayamkottai (current venue of the Bishop Sergeant Training School, Palayamkottai) from his Hindu friend and philanthropist, Vengu Mudaliar, for a confessional price of just Rs. 750.00 and shifted the Preparandi School to the newly acquired campus. Operating from Palayamkottai, Rhenius covered a number of villages all over the Tirunelveli district, which include the current Thoothukudi district and part of Ramnathapuram district and planted small congregations. Solaikudiyiruppu is one of the oasis villages in the sandy dunes of Kudiramozhi Theri. When Rhenius visited Solaikudiyiruppu, the Mukandar of Solaikudiyiruppu Village was Velu Muthu Nadar. Rhenius shared the gospel to Velu Muthu who was baptisied as "Vedha Muthu". Vedha Muthu, accepted Jesus Christ as Saviour and he was the first Protestant Christian in the Megnanapuram Circle.

=== Villages of refuge ===
During the 18th century, Christian missionaries had witnessed persecution of converts coinciding with the Polygar Wars, by clubmen from the state of Ramanathapuram. To protect the new converts, Sundaranandam David, a disciple of Rev. C. F. Schwartz, established a Christian satellite village - called Mudalur, meaning First Village - near Sathankulam, which served as a refuge for local Christians. Following the Mudalur pattern, Rhenius started several Christian satellite villages, including Neduvilai (later known as Megnanapuram) (1825), Idayankulam (1827), Asirvathapuram (1828), Nallur (1832) and Surandai (1833). In 1827, Rhenius created a settlement for the Christians of Puliakurichi in a village he purchased with money donated by a Prussian nobleman, Count Dohna of Scholodin, and named it after him as Dohnavur. The village later became the place where Amy Carmichael founded the Dohnavur Fellowship to protect women rescued from prostitution.

== Split from the CMS ==
In 1832, Rev. Rhenius wrote to the Madras Corresponding Committee of the CMS that an urgent need for more trained and ordained catechists, pastors, and teachers had prompted him to provide special training for some of the most promising young men, seven of whom he had ordained. Until now, precedents going back to Thanjavur and Tranquebar had been followed, whereby the local missionary enjoyed considerable autonomy in such matters. But the CMS Committee was now of the opinion that, although many Indians might have previously received ‘Lutheran orders’, the time for a change had arrived. Daniel Wilson, the new Bishop of Calcutta, indicated that loyalty to the Church of England required that workers under the CMS should henceforth be ordained, if at all, only according to the Church of England rites and not according to those of the Lutherans. Rhenius and his colleague, Bernard Schmidt, replied that their newly trained workers, as catechists, pastors, and teachers, had conscientious objections to following this new instruction.

At about the same time, Rhenius wrote to the new Bishop of Calcutta welcoming him to India and extending to him an invitation to visit Palaiyamkottai as soon as possible. His reports, having dwelt at length on mass conversions then taking place, stressed the need for pastors to watch over new Christians and the recent ordination of seven promising young men. The reply he received, indirectly, declared that his actions were invalid and reprimanded him for violating the apostolic succession. Having waited in vain for the Archdeacon to publish his long dormant review, Rev. Rhenius published the review himself.

No mention was made of a second pamphlet that Rhenius had published at the very same time, entitled Union of Christians, an Address to all Christians, especially to all Ministers of the Gospel. He had attempted to bring about harmony among missionaries of different backgrounds. Instead publication of the first pamphlet provoked a drastic response. The conflict between the Anglican Diocese of Calcutta and Rhenius reached a low point after six catechists of Rhenius' choice refused to be ordained at Madras by the Anglican Bishop John Matthias Turner of Calcutta. A letter of dismissal was delivered to Rhenius by two CMS officers, informing him that his connection with the CMS was at an end and that, since the ‘territory’ in which he had been working belonged to the CMS, he should forthwith depart from Tirunelveli. He handed over all his belongings to Rev. John Tucker; along with his German colleagues he left for Thoothukudi, hired a boat and sailed to Madras. From there Rhenius traveled to Arcot, where he planned to start his own mission.

About the circumstances of his original appointment, Rhenius wrote at length:

When my fellow-labourer [Schnarre] and I were sent out to India, now twentyone years ago, no question was ever put to us on the subject of conformity to the Church of England nor have I received a single application from the Society to conform. I never concealed my sentiments and mode of proceeding I never promised to submit to the English bishops, not even to observe the Church of England forms. No such promise was even asked of me. The Committee of the Society, at that early period, did not even expect that German clergymen should conform to the Church of England.

Several catechists from Tirunelveli appealed to him to return, and Rhenius decided to do so. There, in reduced circumstances, both in Suveshipuram (‘Town of Salvation’) where a house was established in his honour, and in Tirunelveli itself where houses were made available to him, he tried to carry on his work. Money for his support came from all over India and from Europe. In Palayamkottai, the supporters of Rev. Rhenius stopped going to the CMS Church and started a prayer hall (The Present Chinna Koil - "St. John Church" ) for their worship at Aadaikalapuram. Similar splits happened in all the places, where Rhenius had planted churches, including Solaikudiyiruppu. Efforts to reconcile Rhenius and the CMS failed.

== Publications ==
Rhenius wrote several books and translations including;

- An Essay on the Principles of Translating the Holy Scriptures (1820)
- A Grammar of the Tamil Language (1846)
- Summary of a Body of Divinity: In the Tamil Language

== Death and legacy ==
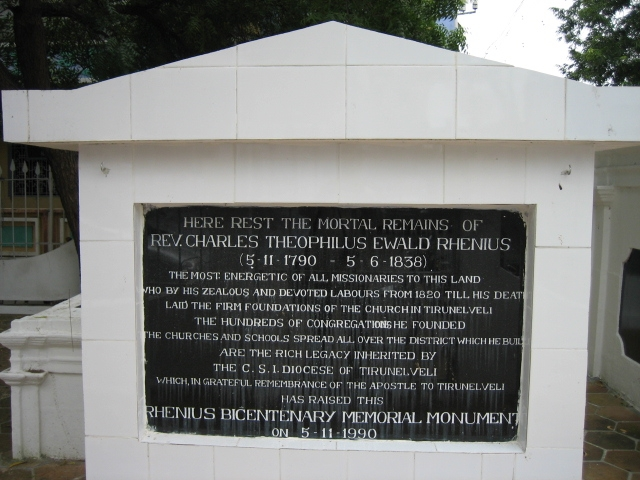
Tomb of Rev. C T E Rhenius at Adaikalapuram, Tirunelveli

Rhenius' health began to fail under the tension and strain caused by the division in the churches. He wanted every one to have a copy of the Bible in the language they could understand. On 5 June 1838, he signed notes to be sent to people in Palayamkottai. In these notes, he asked for subscriptions to the Madras Auxiliary of the Bible Society. On the same evening at 7:30 pm Rhenius died. He was 48 years old at the time of his death. He was buried at Adaikalapuram, Palayamkottai. Rhenius's missionary work was recognized by the Tirunelveli Diocese of the Church of South India (CSI) during the diocese's bicentenary Celebrations in 1978. Rhenius tomb is currently being maintained by the Diocese. During his 15 years in Tirunelveli, Rhenius had set up as many as 371 congregations. His contemporary, the Jewish missionary Dr Wolf, who stayed with Rhenius for a week during September 1833 regarded him as the greatest missionary who had appeared since St. Paul.
