= Thoothukudi =

- City
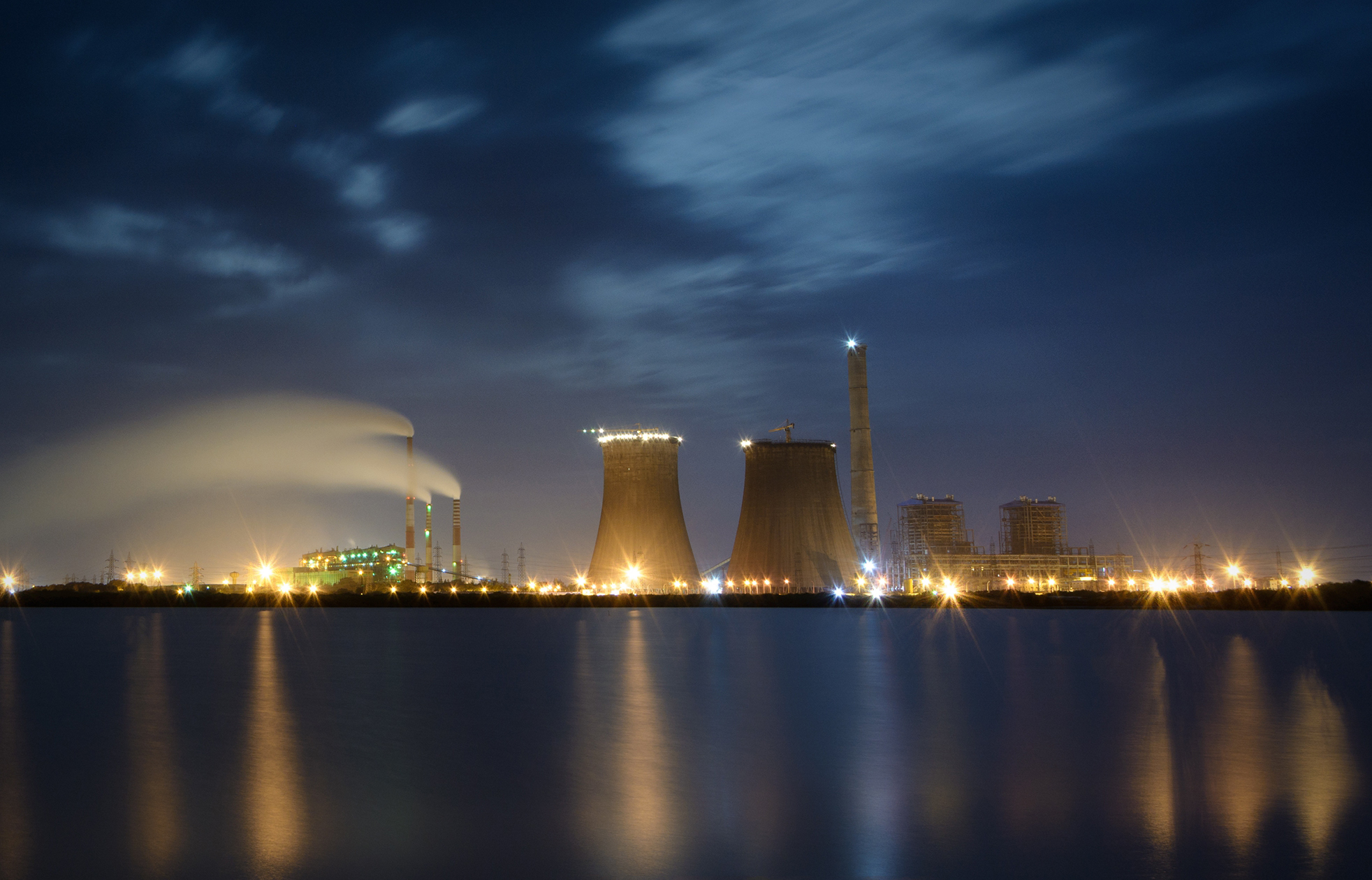
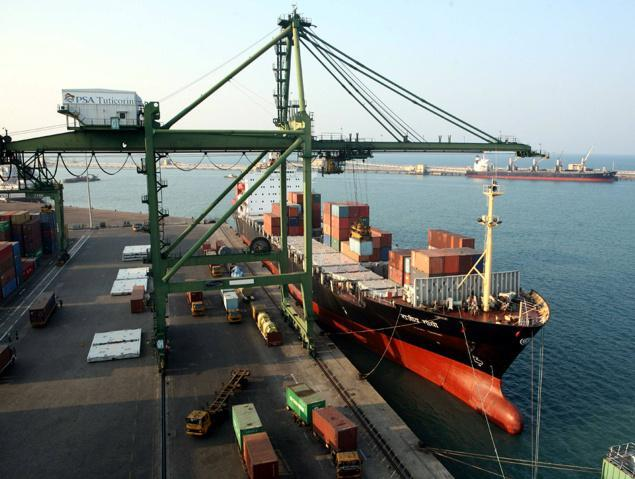
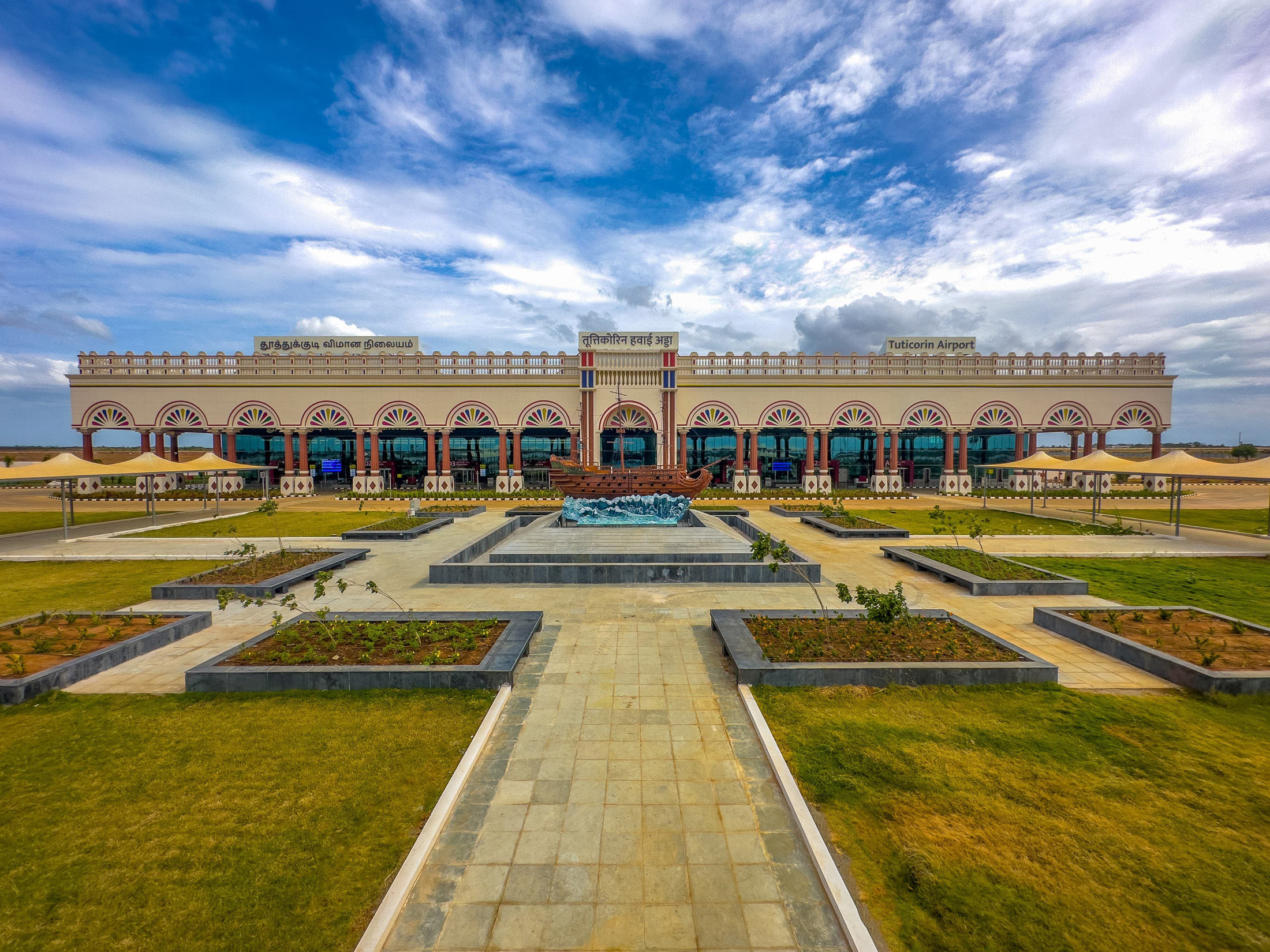
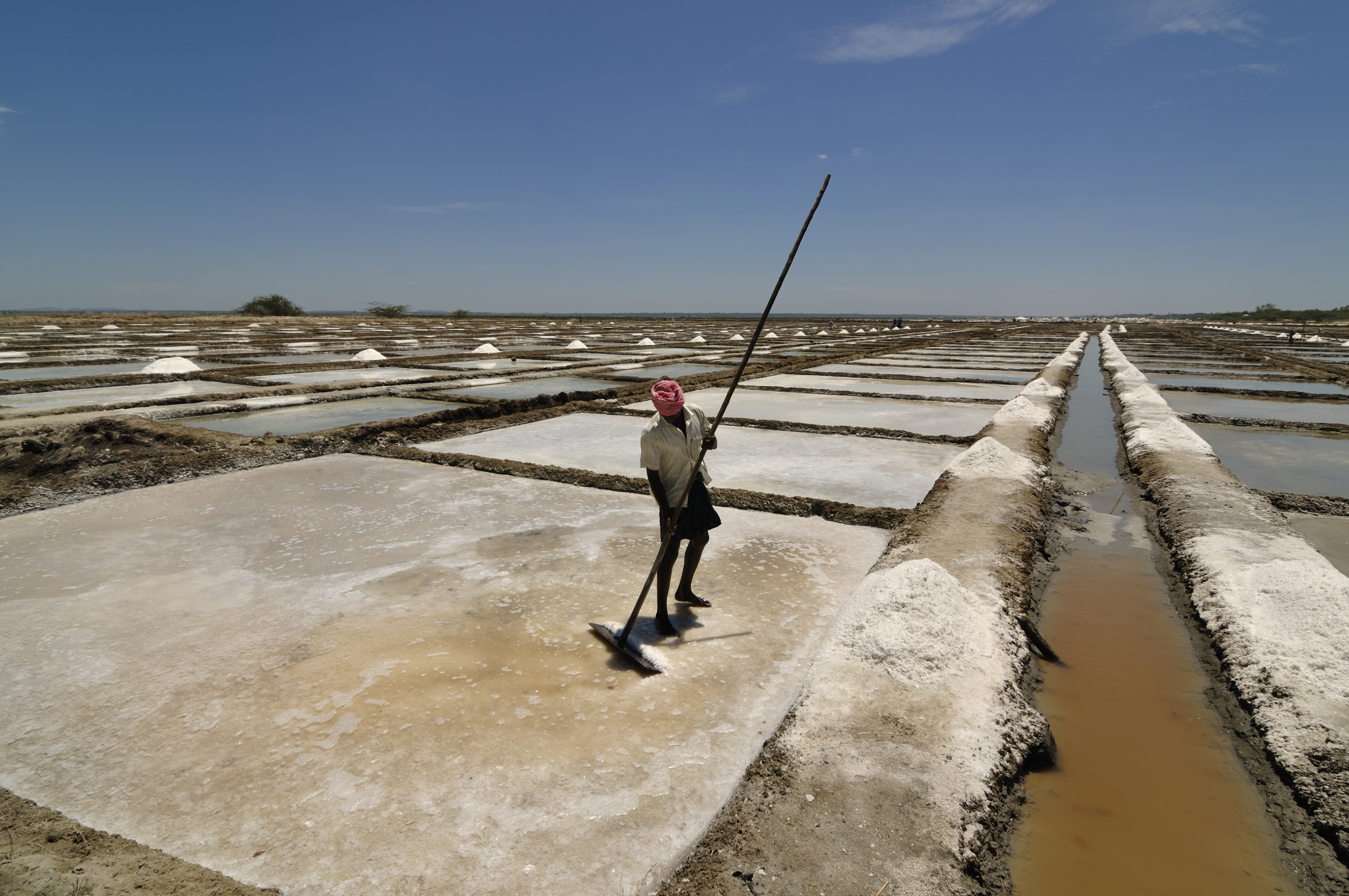
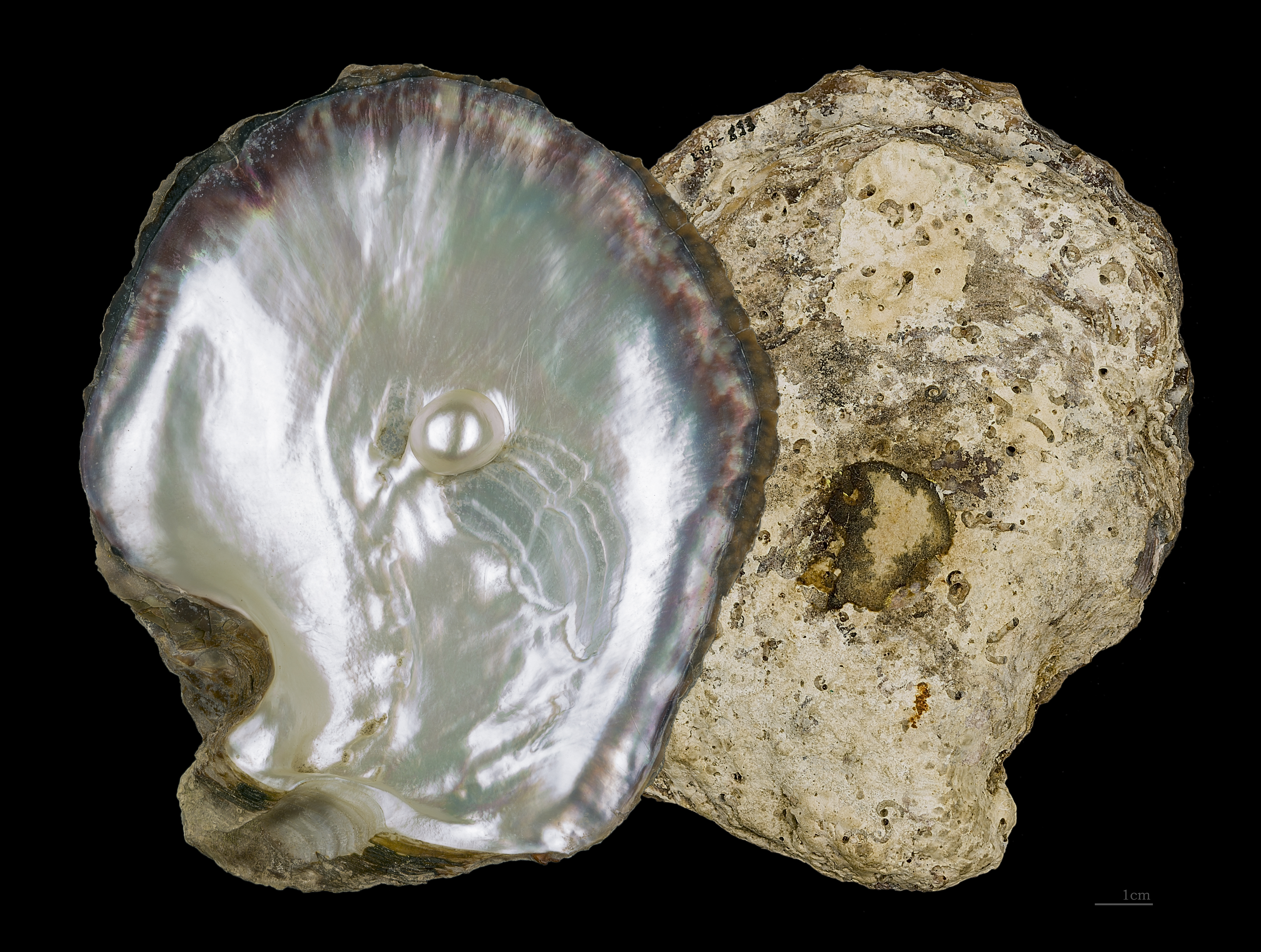
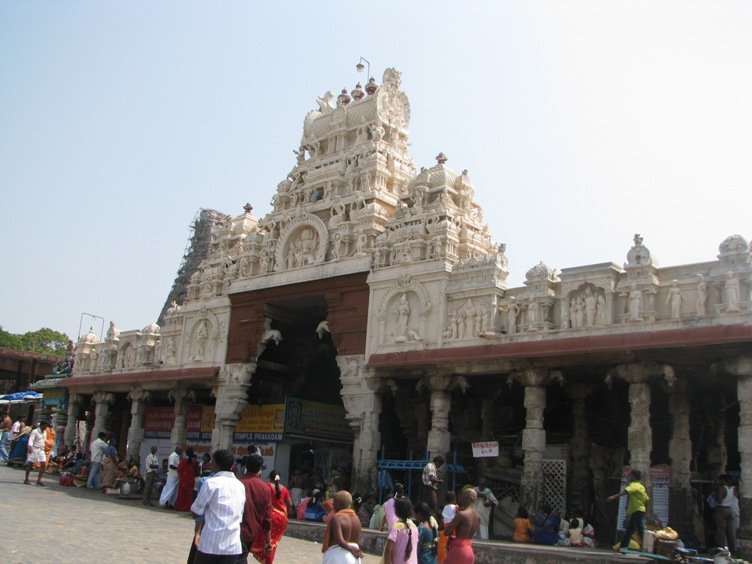
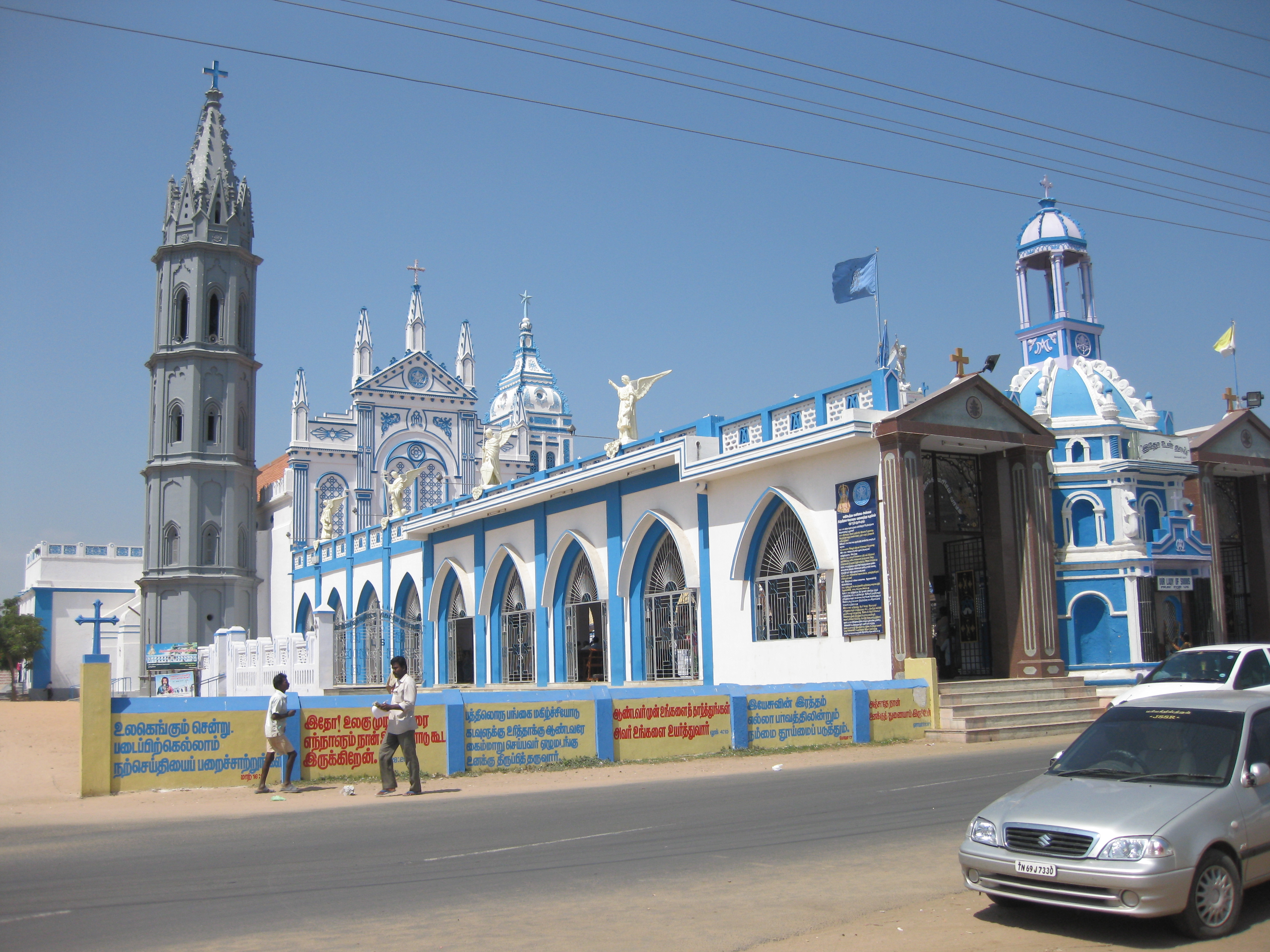
- Clockwise from the top Thoothukkudi Thermal Power Station, Tuticorin Airport, Pearl Oyster of Pearl City, Our Lady Of Snows Church, Tiruchendur Subramaniya Swamy Temple, Salt Pans in Thoothukudi and V.O. Chidambaranar Port Authority
- Nicknames: Pearl City, Salt Capital of Tamil Nadu and Sea Gateway of Tamil Nadu.
- Thoothukudi, Tamil Nadu Thoothukudi (India)
- Coordinates: 8°48′20″N 78°08′42″E
- Country: India
- State: Tamil Nadu
- District: Thoothukkudi
- Former name: Tuticorin
- Region: Pandya Nadu
- Named for: Macaroon, Parotta, Pearl and Salt

Government
  - Type: Municipal corporation
  - Body: Thoothukkudi City Municipal Corporation
  - Mayor: N. Jegan Periyasamy
  - Corporation Commissioner: S. Priyanka, I.A.S.
  - Lok Sabha Constituency: Thoothukkudi
  - State Assembly Constituency: Thoothukkudi

Area
  - Metro: 90.663 km^{2} (35.005 sq mi)
  - Rank: 10
- Elevation: 29 m (95 ft)

Population (2024)
  - City: 500,000
  - Rank: 10th in Tamil Nadu
  - Metro: 411,628
- Demonym: Thoothukudian

Languages
  - Official: Tamil
- Time zone: UTC+5:30 (IST)
- PIN: 628 0xx
- Telephone code: +91-461
- Vehicle registration: TN-69, TN-92, TN-96
- Literacy: 92.10
- Climate: BSh (Köppen)
- Coastline: 40 kilometres (25 mi)
- Website: thoothukudi.nic.in www.thoothukudicorporation.com

Thoothukudi (Tamil: [t̪uːt̪ːukːuɖi], formerly called Tuticorin) is a port industrial city in Thoothukudi district in the Indian state of Tamil Nadu. It lies on the Coromandel Coast of the Bay of Bengal. The city is capital and headquarters of the district. According to the Confederation of Indian Industry, Thoothukudi has the second highest Human Development Index in Tamil Nadu, next to Chennai. Thoothukudi City serves as the headquarters of Tamilnad Mercantile Bank Limited, one of the leading private sector banks in India. Major educational establishments in the city include the Government Thoothukudi Medical College, Fisheries College and Research Institute, Tamil Nadu Maritime Academy, V.O. Chidambaram College, Kamaraj College, Anna University (Thoothukudi Campus), and Government Polytechnic College. The V.O. Chidambaranar Port Authority is one of the major ports in India. Thoothukudi is an emerging energy and industrial hub of South India.

Thoothukudi is known as "Pearl City" due to the pearl fishing carried out in the town. It is a commercial seaport that serves the inland cities of southern India and is one of the sea gateways of Tamil Nadu. It is also one of the major seaports in India, with a history dating back to the 6th century CE. The city is believed to be of significant antiquity and has been ruled, at different times, by the Early Pandyas, Medieval Cholas, Later Cholas, Later Pandyas, Ma'bar Sultanate, Tirunelveli Sultanate, Vijayanagar Empire, Madurai Nayaks, Chanda Sahib, Carnatic kingdom, Portuguese, Dutch, and the British. Thoothukudi was settled by the Portuguese, Dutch, and later the British East India Company.

The city is administered by the Thoothukudi Municipal Corporation, which covers an area of 353.07 km^{2} (136.32 sq mi) and had a population of 500,000 in 2024.The urban agglomeration had a population of 526,000 as of 2011. The majority of the people of the city are employed in salt pans, sea-borne trading, fishing, and tourism.

The 21 islands between Thoothukudi and Rameswaram shores in the Gulf of Mannar are noted as the first Marine Biosphere Reserve of India and have around 3600 species of flora and fauna. This protected area is called the Gulf of Mannar Marine National Park. Our Lady of the Snows Basilica festival is celebrated annually in August. This and the Shiva temple festivals, including Adi Amavasai, Sasti, and Chittirai chariot festivals, are the major festivals of the area. Roadways are the major mode of transport to Thoothukudi, while the city also has rail, air, and sea transport.

== History ==
Thoothukudi is also known by the name 'Pearl City'. It is also called the "Sea Gateway of Tamil Nadu." Thoothukudi is part of the Pearl Fishery Coast and is known for its pearl fishing and shipbuilding industries.

The ancient town of Korkai, near present-day Thoothukudi, has been a center for maritime trade and pearl fishing for more than 2000 years. Ptolemy's geography refers to Korkai as a center of pearl fishing while describing commercial relations between western India and Alexandria, the chief eastern emporium of the Roman Empire. The Periplus says that the Pandyan Empire extended from Comari towards the north, including Korkai, where the pearl fisheries were. Eventually, the Vijayanagara Empire took over Thoothukudi. Conducted trade with the Portuguese. The Empire split into Nayak kingdoms, which were overthrown by the Nawab of Arcot. The Nawab eventually ceded the land to the British in 1801.

In the 16th century, the Portuguese established ports in Thoothukudi, which they called Tuticorim, and the Dutch occupied these ports in the 17th century as evidenced by Pagoda coins. During the 18th century the British overpowered and occupied the town. Being a port town, the town received attention from the rulers for improving their trade, and so it was brought to Municipal status in 1866. Rao Bahadur Cruz Fernandez and J. L. P. Roche Victoria as the chairmen of municipal corporation made significant contributions, laying the foundations for a modern Thoothukudi.

On 20 October 1986, a new district, carved out of the erstwhile Tirunelveli district was born in Tamil Nadu and named after V. O. Chidambaranar, a prominent national leader hailing from Ottapidaram who led the Swadeshi Movement in the south. Since 1997, the district has been named after its headquarters town, Thoothukudi.

Thoothukudi became the citadel of freedom struggles in the early of the 20th century.

=== History of the ports ===
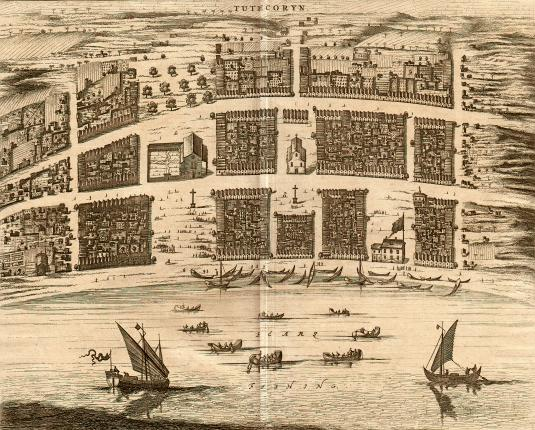
View of the Dutch port in Thoothukudi, in 1752

The major harbour of Thoothukudi is well known as a pearl diving and fishing centre. It is one of the oldest seaports in the world and was the seaport of the Pandyan kingdom after Korkai, near Palayakayal. It was later taken over by the Portuguese in 1548, captured by the Dutch in 1658, and ceded to the British in 1825. The lighthouse built in 1842 marked the beginning of the history of harbour development in the city. Thoothukudi was established as a Municipality in 1866 with J.M.B. Roche Victoria as its first chairman.

It attained the status of corporation on 5 August 2008, after 142 years of being a municipality. Thoothukudi Corporation is divided into 60 wards after its expansion in 2011, and these wards comprise four zones—i.e., East, West, North, and South. East zone has 14–16 and 19–33 wards; West zone has 34–47 wards; North zone has 1–13 and 17, 18 wards; and South zone has 48–60 wards.

The minor port of the Thoothukudi anchorage port with lighter-age facilities has had flourishing traffic for over a century. The first wooden jetty at this port was commissioned in 1864. This port was used for the export of salt, cotton yarn, senna leaves, palmyrah stalks, palmyrah fibers, dry fish, country drugs, and other goods to neighboring countries and for the import of coal, cotton, copra, pulses, and grains. The minor port of Thoothukudi has the distinction of being the intermediate port, handling the highest traffic tonnage of over 1 million per year.

== Geography and climate ==
Thoothukudi is a port town situated in the Gulf of Mannar, about 125 km (78 mi) north of KanyaKumari, and its environs form part of the coastal belt, which forms a continuous stretch of flat country relieved here and there by small rock outcrops. The region surrounding Thoothukudi is liberally dotted with rain-fed tanks. The red soil found on the southern side of Thoothukudi town is composed of quartz and variable quantities of fine red dry dust. The port is an all-weather one. The bay formed by Hare Island, Devils Point, and the main land gives ample protection to the lighters from monsoonal weather. The beach of Thoothukudi is characterized by a calm breeze and very low waves, giving the image of a big river.

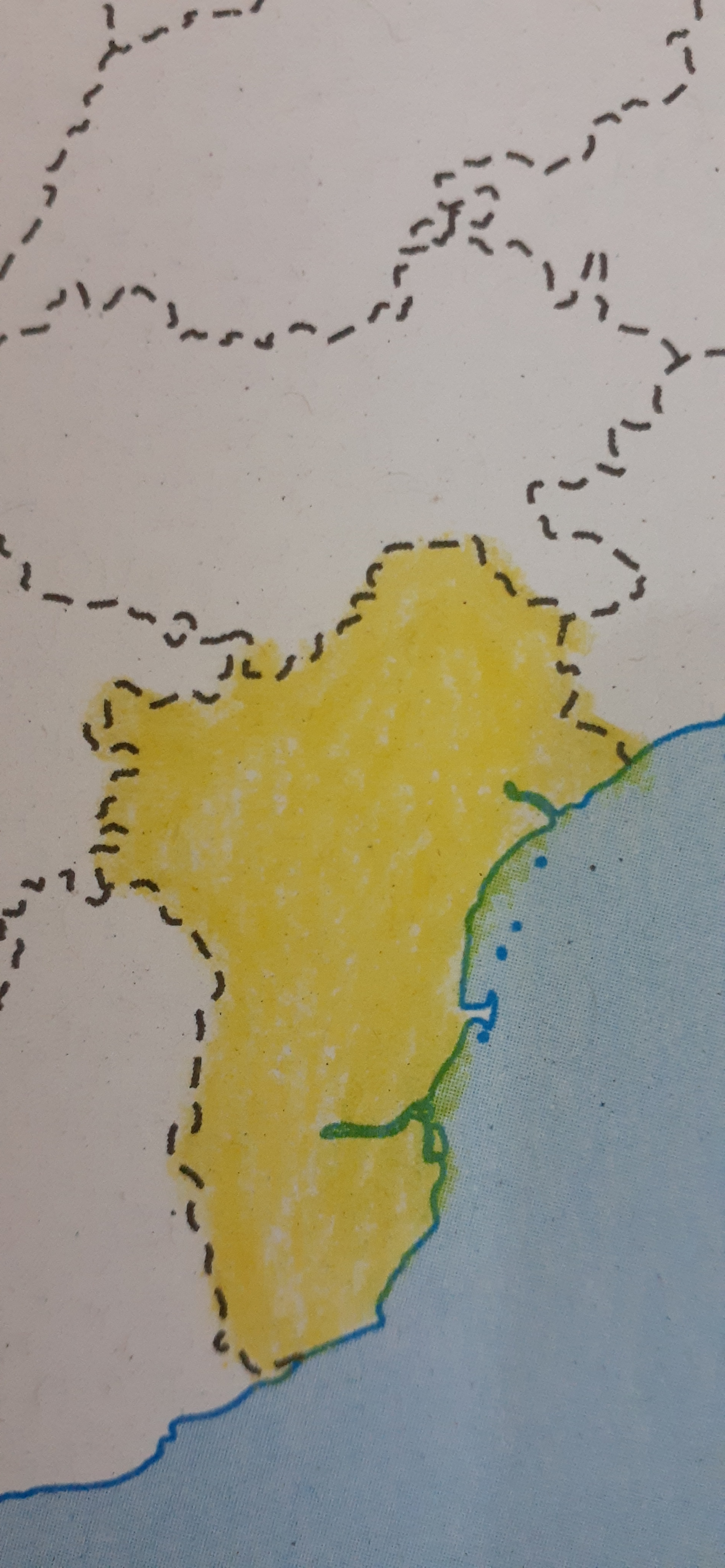
Thoothukudi (Thoothukudi)

Thoothukudi is located at 8.7642°N 78.1348°E. Thoothukudi is located in South India, on the Gulf of Mannar, about 604 kilometres (375 miles) south of Chennai and 125 kilometres (78 miles) north of Kanyakumari. The hinterlands of the port of the city are connected to the districts of Madurai, Tirunelveli, Ramanathapuram, and Tiruchirapalli. The city mostly has flat terrain and is roughly divided into two by the Buckle Channel. Being in a coastal region, the soil is mostly clay and sandy, and the water table varies between 1 and 4 m (3.3 and 13.1 ft) below ground level. The city has loose soil with thorny shrubs in the north and salt pans in the south.

It is located about 590 kilometres (367 miles) southeast of Chennai, 190 kilometres (118 miles) northeast of Thiruvananthapuram, and 580 kilometres (360 miles) southeast of Bangalore.

Thoothukudi experiences a tropical savanna climate (Köppen As) characterized by sweltering summers, hot winters, and occasional heavy rain during the northeast monsoon. Summer extends from March to June, when the climate is very humid. Thoothukudi registers a maximum temperature of 39 °C (102 °F) and a minimum temperature of 32 °C (90 °F). The city receives adequate rainfall only during the months of October and November. The city receives around 444 mm (17.5 in) rainfall from the northeast monsoon, 117.7 mm (4.63 in) during the summer, 74.6 mm (2.9 inches) during the winter, and 63.1 mm (2.5 inches) during the south-west monsoon season. The coolest month is January, and the hottest months are from May to June. The city has very high humidity being in the coastal sector.

The 21 islands between Thoothukudi and Rameswaram shores in the Gulf of Mannar are notified as the first Marine Biosphere Reserve of India. About 36,000 species of flora and fauna exist in the region, which is covered with mangroves, sandy shores, and sea grass beds that are conducive to turtle nesting. The region around the Thoothukudi shores is home to rare marine flora and fauna. Coral reefs and pearl oysters are some of the exotic species, while algae, reef fish, holothurians, shrimps, lobsters, crabs, and Mollusca are very common. Out of the 600 recorded varieties of fish in the region, 72 are found to be commercially important. The thermal discharge from the thermal plants and excessive brine runoff from the salt pans impact the flora and fauna in the region to a large extent.

Climate data for Thoothukudi (1991–2020, extremes 1955–2020)
Month	Jan	Feb	Mar	Apr	May	Jun	Jul	Aug	Sep	Oct	Nov	Dec	Year
Record high °C (°F)	33.3 (91.9)	35.8 (96.4)	38.5 (101.3)	39.1 (102.4)	41.1 (106.0)	40.5 (104.9)	39.8 (103.6)	39.3 (102.7)	39.7 (103.5)	38.6 (101.5)	35.3 (95.5)	33.8 (92.8)	41.1 (106.0)
Mean daily maximum °C (°F)	30.0 (86.0)	30.7 (87.3)	32.2 (90.0)	33.5 (92.3)	34.6 (94.3)	35.9 (96.6)	35.9 (96.6)	35.3 (95.5)	34.4 (93.9)	32.5 (90.5)	30.4 (86.7)	29.8 (85.6)	32.9 (91.2)
Mean daily minimum °C (°F)	22.1 (71.8)	22.8 (73.0)	24.4 (75.9)	25.8 (78.4)	26.4 (79.5)	26.3 (79.3)	26.2 (79.2)	26.0 (78.8)	25.6 (78.1)	24.6 (76.3)	23.5 (74.3)	22.6 (72.7)	24.7 (76.5)
Record low °C (°F)	15.3 (59.5)	16.5 (61.7)	15.6 (60.1)	19.9 (67.8)	21.1 (70.0)	21.3 (70.3)	20.4 (68.7)	20.7 (69.3)	20.0 (68.0)	17.7 (63.9)	16.7 (62.1)	15.6 (60.1)	15.3 (59.5)
Average rainfall mm (inches)	18.5 (0.73)	36.2 (1.43)	39.9 (1.57)	42.6 (1.68)	22.8 (0.90)	3.7 (0.15)	4.2 (0.17)	7.8 (0.31)	18.6 (0.73)	168.3 (6.63)	210.0 (8.27)	109.9 (4.33)	682.4 (26.87)
Average rainy days	1.5	1.6	1.7	2.5	1.4	0.4	0.3	0.5	1.1	6.8	9.9	5.1	32.7
Average relative humidity (%) (at 17:30 IST)	76	76	76	79	74	65	64	68	72	78	81	79	74
Source: India Meteorological Department

Thoothukudi has been ranked 29th best “National Clean Air City” under (Category 3 population under 3 lakhs cities) in India.

== Demographics ==
Historical population
Year	Pop.	±%
1961	124,230	—
1971	159,506	+28.4%
1981	180,832	+13.4%
1991	199,654	+10.4%
2001	320,270	+60.4%
2011	411,628	+28.5%
Sources: 1961–2001; 2011

Thoothukudi was a port town during the period of Portuguese, Dutch and British in the 16th–19th centuries. The city expanded after 1907 due to the presence of public establishments. Residential and industrial growth was maximum around Palayamkottai and Ettaiyapuram roads between 1907 and 1930.

Religion in Thoothukudi City (2011)
Religion	Percent
Hindus	64.97%
Christians	30.14%
Muslims	4.74%
Other or not stated	0.15%

According to 2011 census, Thoothukudi city had a population of 237,830 with a sex-ratio of 1,010 females for every 1,000 males, much above the national average of 929. Thoothukudi had an average literacy rate of 92.10% with male literacy being 94.84%, and female literacy being 89.37%.

A total of 24,959 were under the age of six, constituting 12,684 males and 12,275 females. Scheduled Castes and Scheduled Tribes accounted for 7.42% and 0.1% of the population, respectively. The city had a total of 60,714 households. There were a total of 83,669 workers: 114 cultivators, 154 main agricultural labourers, 1,498 in house hold industries, 77,420 other workers, 4,483 marginal workers, 69 marginal cultivators, 25 marginal agricultural labourers, 280 marginal workers in household industries and 4,109 other marginal workers.

At the time of the 2011 census, Thoothukudi urban agglomeration had a population of 411,628. A total of 42,756 of the population was under 6 years of age.

Tamil is the predominant language in the city and is spoken by almost 99% of the population. The dialect is the Thoothukudi Tamil which is related to Nellai Tamil. English is also widely spoken.

In Thoothukudi Municipal Corporation 65% of the population are Hindus, 30% Christians and 5% Muslims. In the urban agglomeration overall, 71% are Hindus, 25% Christians and 4% Muslims.

== Economy ==
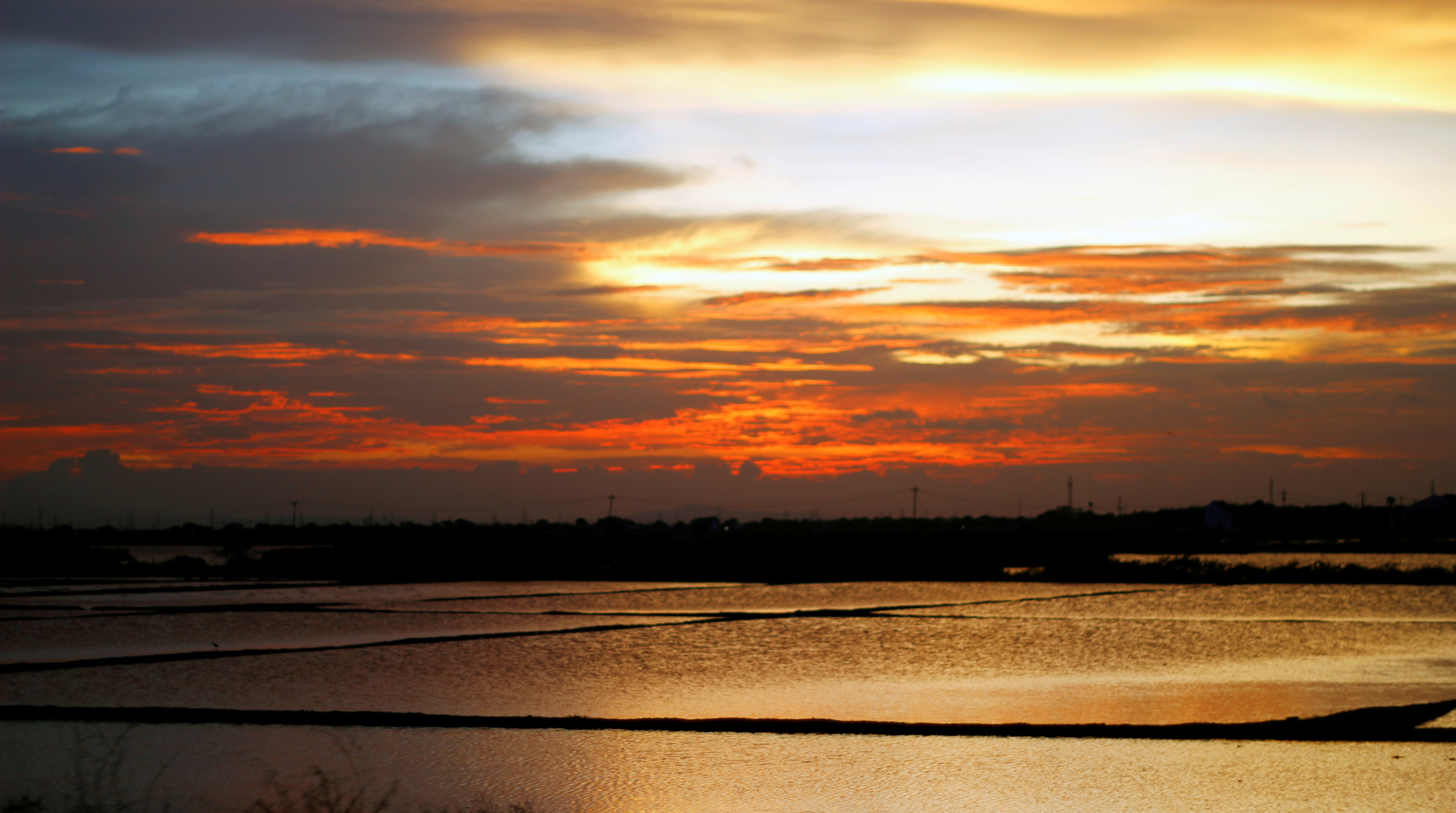
Salt pans near Thoothukudi

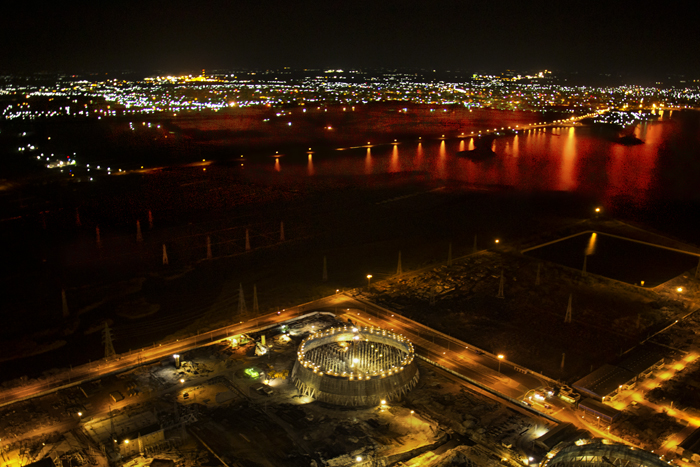
Night Scapes of Pearl City

Salt pans in and around the city contribute majorly to the economy of the city. The salt pans produce 1.2 million tonnes of salt every year, contributing to 90% of the salt produced in the state and 50% needed by the chemical industries of the state. Late industrialist & philanthropist S.K.S.C.Nadarajan who was the head in various commerce & manufacturers forum established the first manufacturing unit of Iodized salt in Thoothukudi, It was the first manufacturing unit of Iodized salt in South India.

The other major industries are shipping, fishing, agricultural, power and chemical industries. Fishing is one of the largest contributor to the local economy. Thoothukudi Fishing Harbor is one of the oldest and largest harbors in Tamil Nadu.

The Thoothukudi Thermal Power Station has five 210 MW generators. The first generator was commissioned in July 1979 and the newly built thermal power plant of 1000 MW by NLC and TANGEDCO, the NTPL Thermal Power Station. In addition to this there are several private power plants like Ind-Barath Thermal Power Limited, Coastal Energen Private Limited, Sterlite Industries Captive power plant. Thoothukudi Spinning Mills Ltd, Southern Petrochemical Industries Corporation, Thoothukudi Alkali Chemicals and Fertilizers Limited, Heavy Water Board Plant, Venus Home Appliances, S.K.S.C.Nadarajan & Bror. - Salt manufacturer, P. S. S. Krishnamurthi Exports Private Limited, Madura Coats Private Limited, DCW Limited, Kilburn Chemicals Ltd, Nila Sea foods, Diamond Sea foods.

Maris Associates, VVD Coconut oil mill, AVM oil mill, Ramesh flowers, Agsar Paints and KSPS Salts are some of the small scale and large scale industries in the city. Thoothukudi is the headquarters city of leading private sector bank Tamilnad Mercantile Bank Limited located. It is one of the fastest growing banks in India during the period of 2007–2012. Its total business is worth 360 billion. The bank targets a Total Business of 500 Billion INR in 2014–15. The city also has a research institute set up by Central Marine Fisheries Research Institute and a Spices laboratory set up by Spices Board of India.

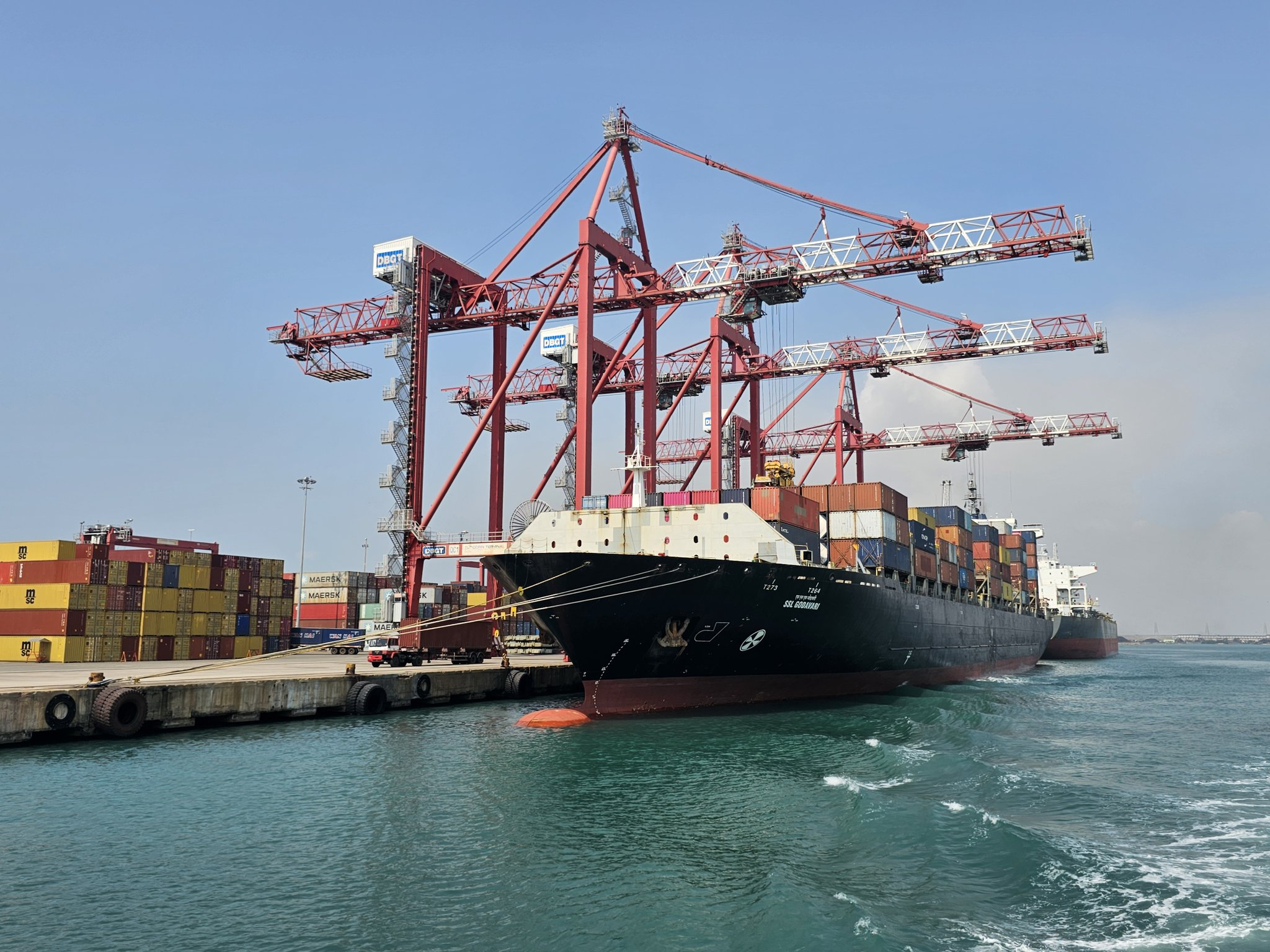
V.O. Chidambaranar Port Authority

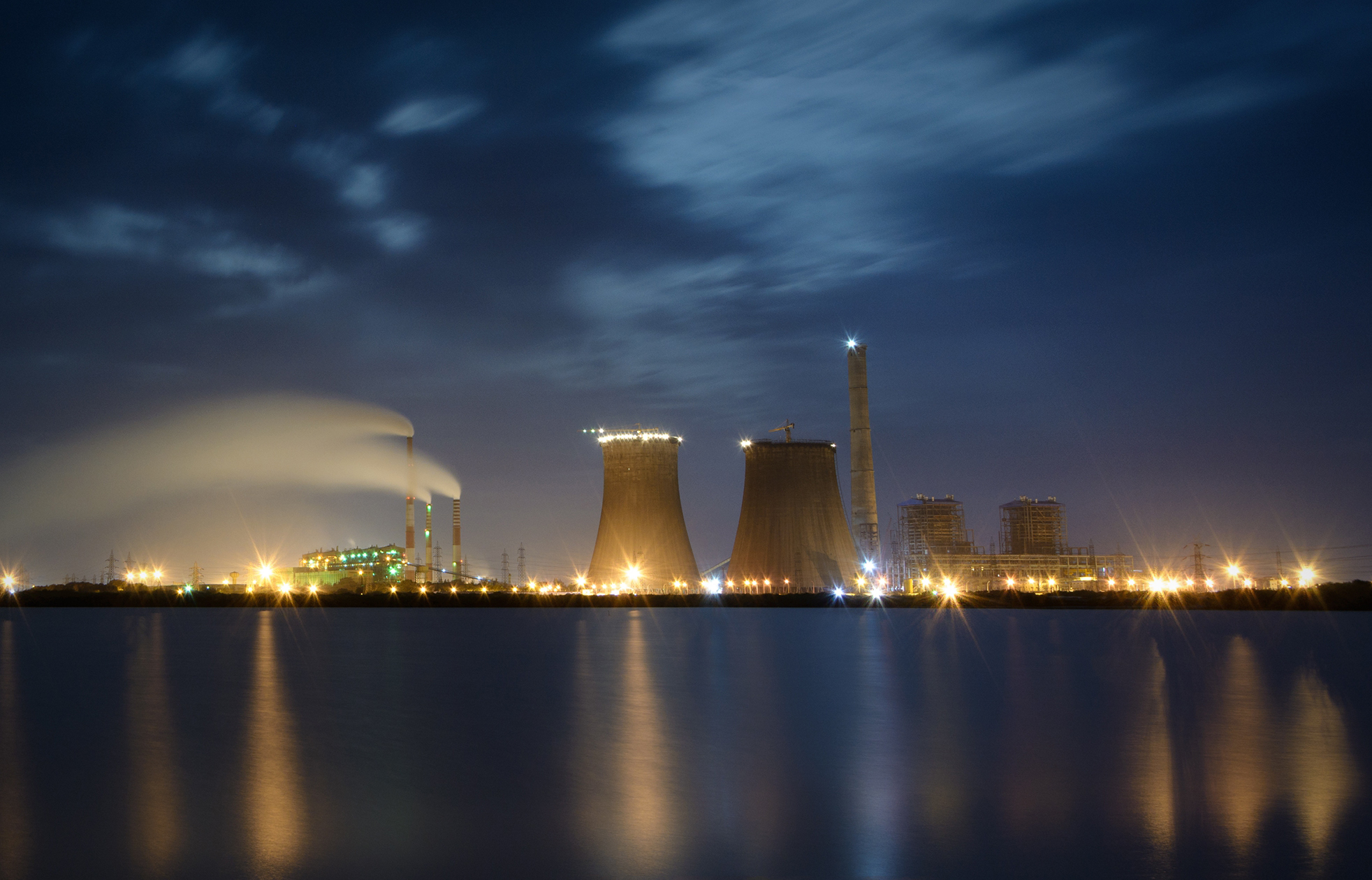
Thoothukudi Thermal Power Station at Night

Thoothukudi also has a State Industries Promotion Corporation of Tamil Nadu Industrial Estate and SIDCO's Industrial Estate which comprises several Small scale and Medium scale Industries. To cope with the increasing trade through Thoothukudi, the Government of India sanctioned the construction of an all-weather port at Thoothukudi. On 11 July 1974, the newly constructed V.O. Chidambaranar Port Authority was declared the tenth major port in India, second only to JN Port (Mumbai) in size. Thoothukudi is an artificial port. During the union budget of 2014–2015, the Central government sanctioned an 11,500 crore Outer Harbour Development Program for Thoothukudi port which is expected to give a push to the export-import sector in southern Tamil Nadu. The project would commence in 2015 and be completed by 2020. The DPR for Outer Harbour was released recently by the Union Shipping Minister. As a port city, almost all major logistics companies (such as St John Freight Systems) have set up office in Thoothukudi. The port also has a dedicated container terminal operated by PSA International. The port recently commenced the operation of 2nd Container Terminal by ABG (DBGIT) Pvt Ltd. The port handled 0.5 million TEU's in 2013–2014 to become third largest container port among Major Ports of India. The port is also a significant port due to the fact that it is located close to East-West International Sea Route. The port has direct cargo and container vessel connectivity to all major ports in the world like Colombo, Singapore, JNPT (Mumbai), Mundra, Jebel Ali, Salalah, Rotterdam, Karachi, Hong Kong and much more. This is the third international port in Tamil Nadu and its second all-weather port. The port also helps to increase the tourism in the region. A new ferry has been commenced between Thoothukudi and Colombo. The Station Commander, Indian Coast Guard Station Thoothukudi is located at Thoothukudi, Tamil Nadu under the operational and administrative control of the Commander, Coast Guard Region (East), Chennai. The Coast Guard Station Thoothukudi was commissioned on April 25, 1991, by Vice Admiral SW Lakhar, NM, VSM and then Director General Coast Guard. The Station Commander is responsible for Coast Guard operations in this area of jurisdiction in Gulf of Mannar.

Thoothukudi is the end point of the proposed Madurai-Thoothukudi Industrial Corridor. The study for this Corridor was completed by the Government of Tamil Nadu recently. The Corridor would consist of four manufacturing regions, one agri-business region, two business investment regions, a special tourism zone, one rural tourism hub and one knowledge hub. The government estimates that this Corridor would attract 1,900,000 crore industrial investment over a period of 10 years. The State Government recently formed a Special Purpose Vehicle (SPV) for Speedy implementation of the Project. The upcoming new railway line from Madurai to Thoothukudi via Aruppukotai, Ettayapuram would serve as the backbone for the development of this corridor. Indian Railways Ministry also completed survey of East Coast Railway Route from Karaikudi to Kanyakumari via Tuticorin is also waiting for approvals, currently the project is shelved by Railway Board.

== Entertainment and leisure ==
Thoothukudi has All India Radio Station which Carries AIR External Services (AM 1053 KHz) for South Asia in English, Sinhala and Tamil (1053 kHz). FM Radio Stations in Thoothukudi City include Suryan FM (93.5 MHz), Hello FM (106.4 MHz). Thoothukudi is the landing point for the first undersea cable of BSNL connecting Thoothukudi with Colombo.

The city has Tharuvai Multi Purpose Stadium which is maintained by Sports Development Authority of Tamil Nadu. Thoothukudi Gymkhana Club has two Synthetic Turf Tennis courts, Thoothukudi is the only other place after Chennai in Tamil Nadu to have this modern facility. Thoothukudi is known for its bakery items especially Macaroon. It is a light, baked confection including ingredients like almonds, coconuts and nuts. Thoothukkudi macaroon is slightly different from European macaroons since it contains cashew as a main ingredient.

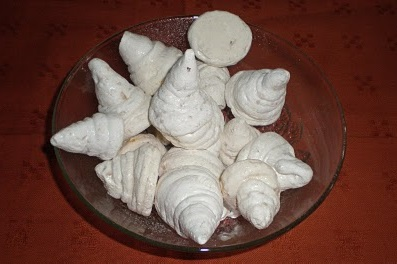
Thoothukkudi Macroons

The Shankara Rameshwarar Udanurai Pagampriya Temple, Vaikundapathi Perumal Temple and Jamia Mosque in the centre of the town and the Our Lady of Snows Basilica in Kadarkarai Salai are the major religious attractions in the city. The church attracts lot of visitors around the country and is one of catholic pilgrimage centers in India dedicated to Virgin Mary. The church festival celebrated yearly during last week of July and first week of August, The Shiva temple festivals like Adi Amavasai, Sasti and Chittirai chariot festivals are the major festivals of the land.

Bharat Ratna Puratchi Thalaivar M.G.R. Park and Rajaji Park in Tamizh Salai, Nehruji Beach Park and Roche Park in Kadarkarai Salai, M.G.R. Park in Kamarajar Salai, Sankara Narayanan Park in Tooveypuram, Kakkan Park in Boltenpuram and State Bank Colony Park are the attracting corporation parks in the city.

Harbor Beach in Jawaharlal Nehru Salai and Muthu Nagar Beach in Kadarkarai Salai are the major beaches in the city. There are numerous islands located close to the city namely Hare Island (accessible by road), Nalla Thanni Island which attracts lot of visitors during weekends and festival seasons. The creek opposite to Roche Park has an eco-park with Kayaking facilities that operates everyday from 6 AM to 6 PM. There are a variety of water sports activities in Muthu Nagar beach which includes Jet skiing, Water scooters, Wind surfing, Paddle surfing, Bump rides, Banana boat ride, Fishing, Snorkeling and Scuba diving.

Cleopatra Multiplex, KSPS Ganapathy Kalaiarangam, Perison Plaza Multiscreen, Sathya Theatre, and Sri Balakrishna Talkies are the movie theaters in the city for movie entertainment.

== Transport ==
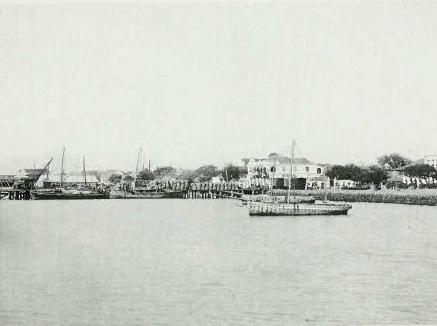
Port of Thoothukudi during the Madras Presidency, c.a. 1913

Thoothukudi has an extensive transport network and is well-connected to other major cities by road, rail, air and sea. The corporation maintains a total length of 428.54 km (266.28 mi). The city has 37.665 km (23.404 mi) concrete roads, 329.041 km (204.457 mi) black topped surface roads, 56.592 km (35.165 mi) water bound macadam roads and 5.242 km (3.257 mi) earthen roads. The major roads within the city are Tamizh Salai connecting NH-138, Ettayapuram Salai connecting NH-38, Ramanathapuram Salai connecting SH-49, Tiruchendur Salai connecting SH-176, V.O. Chidambaranar Salai and Victoria Extension Road. The highway V.O.C. Salai outside the city connects the Port Authority, Thermal Power Station, SPIC industry and NH-38. The city has two bus termini: Perarignar Anna Bus Terminus in Meenakshipuram Pradhana Salai and Thoothukkudi New Bus Terminus in Ettayapuram Salai. About 700 buses are operated from these two bus stands to local and intercity destinations.

The Tamil Nadu State Transport Corporation operates daily services connecting various cities to Thoothukudi. A new regional headquarters of TNSTC is being established in Thoothukudi which enables better transportation by government buses. The corporation operates a computerised reservation centre in the bus stand of the city. The State Express Transport Corporation operates long-distance buses connecting the city to important cities like Bengaluru, Chennai, Vellore, Nagapattinam and Kanniyakumari. Thoothukudi being a harbour city has lot of container truck transport. As of 2008, the number of container trucks entering the city is 1000. The expansion of ECR from Thoothukudi to Kanniyakumari via Tiruchendur and Koodankulam at a cost of 2.57 billion sanctioned and is in progress.

Thoothukudi Railway Station is one of the oldest and popular railway stations in India. It is one of few stations in Southern Tamil Nadu to have Pitline facility for Cleaning and Maintenance of Rail Coaches facilitating the operation of Long distance Trains from Thoothukudi. The line between Madurai and Thoothukudi was opened in 1874. The lines connecting to Thoothukudi is being electrified recently. Thoothukudi has direct daily rail connectivity to Chennai, Mysore, Coimbatore, Okha, Tirunelveli. Vivek Express which connects Thoothukudi with Okha. Pearl City Express which connects Thoothukudi with Chennai Egmore Station is one of the Prestigious Trains of Southern Railway. An 8 Coach Link Train to Guruvayur Express has been introduced recently which connects Thoothukudi with Chennai during daytime. South Indian Railway began a Madras – Thoothukudi service connecting with the boat to Ceylon in 1899. The station was declared a Model Station in 2007 and several infrastructure developments are in process. There is also halt-railway station, known as Tuti-Melur.

Thoothukudi Airport is at Vagaikulam, 14 km (9 mi) from the heart of the city. It has flights to Bengaluru and Chennai operated by IndiGo, it operate daily four services to Chennai and one trip to Bengaluru. The State Government and Airport Authority of India plans to extend the runway and modernise the airport to handle to more traffic and bigger aircraft. The land acquisition process is completed and AAI is ready to start the expansion works. A new Terminal has been planned and the runway is to expanded to facilitate the movement of Airbus A320 and Boeing 737s. There was also a proposal in 2009 for a greenfield airport. Madurai Airport is the nearest customs airport with daily international connections to Colombo and Dubai. Thiruvananthapuram International Airport in Kerala is the nearest international airport located at a distance of about 200 km (124 mi).

V.O. Chidambaranar Port Authority is an artificial deep-sea harbour. It is one of the major ports in India. A luxury ferry liner, the Scotia Prince, was operating a ferry service to Colombo, Sri Lanka. Ferry services between the two countries have been revived after more than 20 years.

== Municipal administration and politics ==
The Thoothukudi municipality was established in 1866 during the British Raj. It was elevated to a municipal corporation on 5 August 2008, which expanded its area to 90.663 km^{2} (35.005 sq mi) within the city limits. The municipal corporation is divided into four zones: North, East, West, and South. It encompasses 60 wards, each represented by an elected councilor. The corporation's functions are divided into six departments: general administration and personnel, engineering, revenue, public health, city planning, and information technology (IT). Each department operates under the authority of a municipal commissioner, who serves as the executive head. Legislative powers are held by a body composed of 60 members, with one representative from each of the 60 wards.

=== Municipal corporation officials ===
Elected members

Election	Position	Name	Political party	Term in office		
Election	Position	Name	Political party	Assumed office	Left office	Time in office
2022	Mayor	P. Jegan	Dravida Munnetra Kazhagam	4 March 2022	Incumbent	4 years, 263 days
2022	Deputy Mayor	S. Jenitta	Dravida Munnetra Kazhagam	4 March 2022	Incumbent	4 years, 263 days

==== List of members of parliament ====
Thoothukkudi is part of the Thoothukkudi Lok Sabha constituency, which elects a representative to the Lok Sabha every five years. Since the 2009 elections, the assembly seat has been won by the Dravida Munnetra Kazhagam (DMK) three times: in 2009, 2019, and 2024. The All India Anna Dravida Munnetra Kazhagam (AIADMK) secured the seat once in the 2014 election.

No.	Name	Term of office		Lok Sabha (Election)	Political party
No.	Name	Assumed office	Left office	Lok Sabha (Election)	Political party
1	S. R. Jeyadurai	1 June 2009	18 May 2014	15th (2009)	Dravida Munnetra Kazhagam
2	J. Jayasingh Thiyagaraj Natterjee	4 June 2014	24 May 2019	16th (2014)	All India Anna Dravida Munnetra Kazhagam
3	Kanimozhi Rajathi Karunanidhi	18 June 2019	5 June 2024	17th (2019)	Dravida Munnetra Kazhagam
3	Kanimozhi Rajathi Karunanidhi	25 June 2024	Incumbent	18th (2024)	Dravida Munnetra Kazhagam

==== List of members of the legislative assembly ====
Thoothukkudi is part of the Thoothukkudi Assembly constituency, which elects a representative to the Tamil Nadu Legislative Assembly every five years. From the 1952 elections, the assembly seat was won by the Indian National Congress (INC) three times: in 1952, 1957, and 1960. The Dravida Munnetra Kazhagam (DMK) secured victories seven times in the elections of 1967, 1971, 1989, 1996, 2006, 2016, and 2021. The All India Anna Dravida Munnetra Kazhagam (AIADMK) won the seat six times, in the elections of 1977, 1980, 1984, 1991, 2001, and 2011. The Tamilaga Vettri Kazhagam (TVK) won the seat once in the 2026 election.

No.	Name	Term of office		Assembly (Election)	Political party
No.	Name	Assumed office	Left office	Assembly (Election)	Political party
1	J. L. P. Roche Victoria	3 May 1952	31 March 1957	1st (1952)	Indian National Congress
2	P. P. M. T. Ponnusamy	29 April 1957	24 April 1958	2nd (1957)	Indian National Congress
3	A. Samuel	3 September 1958	29 July 1959	2nd (1957)	Indian National Congress
4	R. J. Sundar Singh	10 March 1960	1 March 1962	2nd (1957)	Indian National Congress
5	S. Ponnusamy	29 March 1962	28 February 1967	3rd (1962)	Indian National Congress
6	M. S. Sivasami	15 March 1967	5 January 1971	4th (1967)	Dravida Munnetra Kazhagam
7	K. R. Ramalingam	22 March 1971	31 January 1976	5th (1971)	Dravida Munnetra Kazhagam
8	N. Dhanasekaran	4 July 1977	17 February 1980	6th (1977)	All India Anna Dravida Munnetra Kazhagam
9	S. N. Rajendran	19 June 1980	15 November 1984	7th (1980)	All India Anna Dravida Munnetra Kazhagam
9	S. N. Rajendran	25 February 1985	30 January 1988	8th (1984)	All India Anna Dravida Munnetra Kazhagam
10	N. Periasamy	6 February 1989	30 January 1991	9th (1989)	Dravida Munnetra Kazhagam
11	V. P. R. Ramesh	1 July 1991	13 May 1996	10th (1991)	All India Anna Dravida Munnetra Kazhagam
(10)	N. Periasamy	22 May 1996	14 May 2001	11th (1996)	Dravida Munnetra Kazhagam
12	S. Rajammal	22 May 2001	12 May 2006	12th (2001)	All India Anna Dravida Munnetra Kazhagam
13	P. Geetha Jeevan	17 May 2006	14 May 2011	13th (2006)	Dravida Munnetra Kazhagam
14	S. T. Chellapandian	23 May 2011	21 May 2016	14th (2011)	All India Anna Dravida Munnetra Kazhagam
(13)	P. Geetha Jeevan	25 May 2016	3 May 2021	15th (2016)	Dravida Munnetra Kazhagam
(13)	P. Geetha Jeevan	11 May 2021	5 May 2026	16th (2021)	Dravida Munnetra Kazhagam
15	A. Srinath	11 May 2026	Incumbent	17th (2026)	Tamilaga Vettri Kazhagam

== Education and utility services ==
There are 31 schools in Thoothukudi city, of which 10 are operated by the municipal corporation. There are 31 high schools and higher secondary schools, one of which is a government school. Tuticorin has high literacy rates and lower literacy rate gap between males and females. There are five arts and science colleges, three polytechnics in the city. It also has a Fisheries college in the outskirts affiliated to Tamil Nadu Dr. J. Jayalalithaa Fisheries University, Nagapattinam. There is one government and many private Engineering college affiliated to Anna University in the city and arts colleges on Tamizh Salai and Tiruchendur road. There is also a Government Medical college and Hospital. The colleges are affiliated to the Manonmaniam Sundaranar University in Tirunelveli. There are three Industrial Training Institutes (ITI) and about 50 computer training centres also. The city has Government Medical College Hospital and new ESI Hospital is being constructed at the Bypass road.

Electricity supply to the city is regulated and distributed by the Tamil Nadu Electricity Board (TNEB). Usage of Plastic polythene bags is banned inside corporation limits. Thoothukudi is the headquarters of the Thoothukudi region of TNEB that has four divisions. The city along with its suburbs forms the Thoothukudi Electricity Distribution Circle. A Chief Distribution engineer is stationed at the regional headquarters. Water supply is provided by the Thoothukudi City Corporation from the Tamirabarani with 8 overhead tanks. In the period 2010–2011, a total of 21 million litres of water was supplied everyday for households in the city.

About 96 metric tonnes of solid waste are collected from the city every day by door-to-door collection and subsequently the source segregation and dumping is carried out by the sanitary department of the Thoothukudi Municipal corporation. The coverage of solid waste management had efficiency of 94% as of 2011. The underground drainage system was constituted in 1984 and covers only certain zones of the corporation area. The remaining sewerage system for disposal of sullage is through septic tanks and public conveniences. The corporation maintains a total of 69.47 kilometres (43.17 mi) of storm water drains. The corporation operates five health posts throughout the city. Apart from these, there are various private hospitals and clinics that take care of the health care needs of the citizens.

Thoothukudi comes under the Thoothukudi Telecom District of the Bharat Sanchar Nigam Limited (BSNL), India's state-owned telecom and internet services provider. Both Global System for Mobile Communications (GSM) and Code division multiple access (CDMA) mobile services are available. Apart from telecom, BSNL also provides broadband internet service. Thoothukudi is one of the few cities in India where BSNL's Caller Line Identification (CLI) based internet service Netone is available.

== Environmental Issues ==
Air Pollution is the major environmental challenge faced by Thoothukudi while water and noise pollution are environmental issues too. Thoothukudi is the only city from the state of Tamil Nadu to be listed as one of the Non-attainment cities by Ministry of Environment primarily on the basis of excess PM10 under the National Ambient Air Quality Monitoring Program (NAMP) for the period 2011 - 2015.

The city has a lot of red industries as a result of which the PM10 — tiny airborne particles seven times finer than human hair–exceeds national standards (60 micrograms per cubic metre, or μg/m^{3}) by around 200 per cent. Indian Standards for PM10 is three times higher than WHO standards for PM10 particles which is 20 micrograms per cubic metre. Environmentalists blame public and private coal-fired thermal power plants, copper smelter and chemical industries for polluting the air quality of Thoothukudi.

A 2010 study published in the Journal of Ecobiotechnology cites Industrial pollution in Thoothukudi as a major cause for various health issues. Respondents of the study had various health issues like skin diseases, eye irritation, asthma, allergy, respiratory problems, cancer and hypertension. The study also observed that Industrial disposals and other chemical contaminates that enter waterways through agricultural runoff, storm water drains, and industrial discharges may persist in the environment for long periods and be transported by water or air over long distances. They disturbed the function of the endocrine system, resulting in reproductive, developmental, and behavioral problems. The endocrine disrupters reduced the fertility and increased the occurrence of still births, birth defects, and hormonally dependent Cancers such as breast, testicular, and prostate cancers. The effects on the developing nervous system can include impaired mental and psychomotor development, as well as cognitive impairment and behavior abnormalities. Studies like these led the people of Thoothukudi to protest for the closing of the Sterlite plant in May 2018. On the 22nd of that month, the police opened fire on protestors killing 13 and injuring 102. The plant was soon closed.

== Research Institutes/Centres ==
There are many central and state government research institutes/centres also situated inside and outskirt of Thoothukudi city. Those are: Fisheries College and Research Institute (FCRI) outside on Harbour bybass road, Thoothukudi Research Centre of The Central Marine Fisheries Research Institute (CMFRI) on the Beach road, Suganthi Devadason Marine Research Institute (SDMRI) on Beach road, Outreach Centre of CSIR-Central Electrochemical Research Institute (CERI) in new harbour area, Thoothukudi and Sub-Regional office of The Marine Products Export Development Authority (MPEDA) in Millerpuram.

== See also ==
- Thoothukudi Airport
- Thoothukudi massacre
- Tuticorin Railway Station
- Tuti-Melur Railway Station
- Perarignar Anna Bus Terminus
- V.O. Chidambaranar Port Authority
