= Ponnusami =

Ponnusami could be both a given name and a middle name. Notable people with the name include:

- C. P. Radhakrishnan (born 1957), Indian politician
- Ponnusami Nadar (died 1968), Indian politician
