= P. Geetha Jeevan =

Indian politician (born 1970)

Minister for Social Welfare and Women Empowerment
- In office 7 May 2021 – 5 May 2026
- Chief Minister: M. K. Stalin
- Preceded by: V. Saroja
- Constituency: Thoothukkudi
- In office 20 May 2008 – 14 May 2011
- Chief Minister: M. Karunanidhi
- Preceded by: Poongothai Aladi Aruna
- Succeeded by: Selvi Ramajayam
- Constituency: Thoothukkudi

Minister for Social Welfare
- In office 13 May 2006 – 19 May 2008
- Chief Minister: M. Karunanidhi
- Preceded by: P. V. Damodaran
- Succeeded by: Pongalur N. Palanisamy
- Constituency: Thoothukkudi

Member of the Tamil Nadu Legislative Assembly
- In office 25 May 2016 – 5 May 2026
- Chief Minister: J. Jayalalithaa; O. Panneerselvam; Edappadi K. Palaniswami; M. K. Stalin
- Preceded by: S. T. Chellapandian
- Succeeded by: Srinath
- Constituency: Thoothukkudi
- In office 17 May 2006 – 14 May 2011
- Chief Minister: M. Karunanidhi
- Preceded by: S. Rajammal
- Succeeded by: S. T. Chellapandian
- Constituency: Thoothukkudi

Member of Panchayat
- In office 2001–2006
- Constituency: Thoothukudi District Panchayat

Chairperson of Panchayat
- In office 1996–2001
- Constituency: Thoothukudi District Panchayat

Personal details
- Born: Periasamy Geetha Jeevan; 6 May 1970 (age 56) Thoothukudi, Tamil Nadu, India
- Party: Dravida Munnetra Kazhagam
- Spouse: Jeevan Jacob
- Relations: N. Periasamy Nadar(father)
- Children: Jeena Ebi Sundari, Dr. Maghil John Santhosh
- Occupation: Politician
- Website: P. GEETHA JEEVAN

Periasamy Geetha Jeevan (born 6 May 1970) is an Indian politician serving as the current Minister for Social Welfare and Women Empowerment of Tamil Nadu. She is a Member of the Legislative Assembly, representing Thoothukkudi constituency in the Tamil Nadu Legislative Assembly. She also formerly served as the Minister for Animal Husbandry of Tamil Nadu.

== Early life and education ==
Geetha Jeevan was born in Thoothukudi, Tamil Nadu, India, on 6 May 1970 and is the daughter of N. Periasamy Nadar, himself a former Thoothukkudi constituency MLA. She holds a master's degree in commerce awarded by A.P.C. Mahalakshmi College for Women, Thoothukudi, having previously attended Geetha Matriculation Higher Secondary School in the city.

== Political career ==
Geetha Jeevan was a member and chairperson of Thoothukudi district panchayat between 1996 and 2006. In 2006 she became an MLA representing the Thoothukkudi constituency in the Tamil Nadu Legislative Assembly. She was given the Social Welfare ministry portfolio after Poongothai Aladi Aruna was implicated in a telephone controversy.

In the 2011 Tamil Nadu state election, she was defeated by S. T. Chellapandian of the AIADMK. In the 2016 and 2021 elections, she was consecutively elected as an MLA from her constituency and became Minister for Social Welfare and Women Empowerment in the ministry headed by Chief Minister of Tamil Nadu M. K. Stalin, the third son of the former chief minister M. Karunanidhi.
