= Kamaraj College =

College in Thoothukudi, India

- Motto: Knowledge Service Honour
- Type: Arts & Science College
- Established: 1966
- Accreditation: A+ Grade by NAAC
- Affiliations: Manonmaniam Sundaranar University
- President: Ilango Vetrivel
- Vice-president: A. Nadarajan
- Principal: Dr. K. Bhanumathi, Principal
- Founder Patron: A.M.M.S. Ganesan
- Location: Thoothukudi, Tamil Nadu, India
- Campus: Urban
- Website: kamarajcollege.ac.in

Kamaraj College is one of the oldest arts and science colleges in Tamil Nadu, having been established in the southern port city of Thoothukkudi by various Hindu charitable organizations in the year 1966. The college has been named after the former chief minister of Tamil Nadu K. Kamaraj.

The college is run by the Tuticorin Educational Society, which also runs a Matriculation School and a women's college within the lush green campus. The campus covers an area of 50 acres and has a student strength of 5,000.

The college and society were founded by the late industrialist, Sri. AMMS Ganesa Nadar, managing director, The Tuticorin Spinning Mills Ltd, and Hindu Charitable organizations including Karapettai Hindu Nadar Sangam, for the noble purpose of upliftment of the Hindu community.

The institution offers a variety of courses in business, commerce, arts and science with special courses on e-commerce, shipping & logistics, forensic science, visual communication, sports science, artificial intelligence and data science.

A total of 12 courses are offered under the govt-aided stream, with 35 courses offered under the self-financed stream. Together, there are 31 under-graduate courses, 16 post-graduate programs, and 10 research centers for doctoral studies.

The college is affiliated to Manonmaniam Sundaranar University, Tirunelveli, and is accredited with A+ grade by NAAC, with a CGPA of 3.31. The courses BCA, BBA, MBA & MCA offered by the college, is approved by the AITCE, New Delhi.

== Departments ==
=== Arts & Humanities ===
- Tamil
- English
- History
- Criminology

=== Commerce ===
- Commerce
- Business
- Economics

=== Science ===
- Computer Science
- Mathematics
- Microbiology
- Chemistry
- Physics
- Zoology
- Botany
- Visual Communication
- Physical Education

== Major Events during the Academic Year ==
1. Academic Events

Various International, National and State-level Conferences, Seminars, Workshops and Exhibitions are organized by the respective departments. About 200 such programs are held every year in the college.

2. Celebrations

The college celebrates Independence Day, Republic Day, Pongal Day, Women's Day and Kamarajar's Birthday in a grand manner. Mini-cultural programs are generally held during these events celebrating the local tradition and culture

3. Sporting & Cultural Events

Three major Sporting and Cultural events are organized by the college every year.

Thamarabarani Trophy and Founder's Day Trophy are inter-departmental competitions held in odd and even semesters respectively. All 24 departments of the college participate in these competitions

Over 30 colleges and schools from all over Tamil Nadu participate in the annual Pongalovium Trophy inter-collegiate cum inter-school sports-cultural festival organized by the college

== Campus Placement ==
Campus Placement is an important avenue for career development of the students. About 250 students are placed via campus recruitment in the college. A wide range of reputed companies, from large Banking & Finance companies to ITES firms, Publishing companies to Core Manufacturing firms, visit the college every year for their requirements

== Entrepreneurship Development ==
A Business Incubation Centre has been established to assist the students to develop their entrepreneurial traits and enable them to become entrepreneurs straight out of college. The center is supported by the Faculty, Management and Alumni of the Institution. The centre, located within the college premises, provides working space, meeting rooms and secretarial services and add-on support like legal services, technology and IP related services.

== Infrastructure ==
Kamaraj College has been developed and is fully established with five Academic Blocks.

- Swami Vivekananda Block (Aided Courses)
- AMMS Ganesan Nadar Block (Aided Courses)
- Golden Jubilee Block (SF Courses)
- C.V. Raman Block (SF Courses)
- Bharathiyar Block (SF Courses)

The academic buildings house the Lecture Halls, laboratories and Seminar Halls

The other campus buildings include:

- Admin Block
- Auditorium
- Marine Research Centre
- Canteen
- Boys Hostel Building
- Girls Hostel Building

The Admin building houses the Central Library, Business Incubation Centre, Research Centre, Alumni Centre, Chess Club, Principal's Office and Society Conference Hall. Marine Research Centre has interesting live sea-water animals on display.

The campus has various sporting facilities including a full-size Foot-ball Ground, Basket-ball Court, Kabaddi Ground and Kho-Kho ground.

Apart from the above, there is also a Matriculation School and a dedicated Women's College within the 50-acre campus

== Affiliations & Accreditations ==
The college is affiliated with Manonmanium Sundaranar University, Tirunelveli for its UG, PG, and PhD Programs. The professional MCA program offered by the institution is approved by AICTE, Delhi. The college is recognized by the University Grants Commission.

== Alumni ==
All students passing out of Kamaraj College automatically become members of their respective Department Alumni Association. The college has a thriving Alumni body. An Annual Alumni Meet is held every October in a grand manner at the college campus with various events and competitions. Alumni members extend their support in Student Placement and Business Incubation activities
