= J. L. P. Roche Victoria =

Indian politician

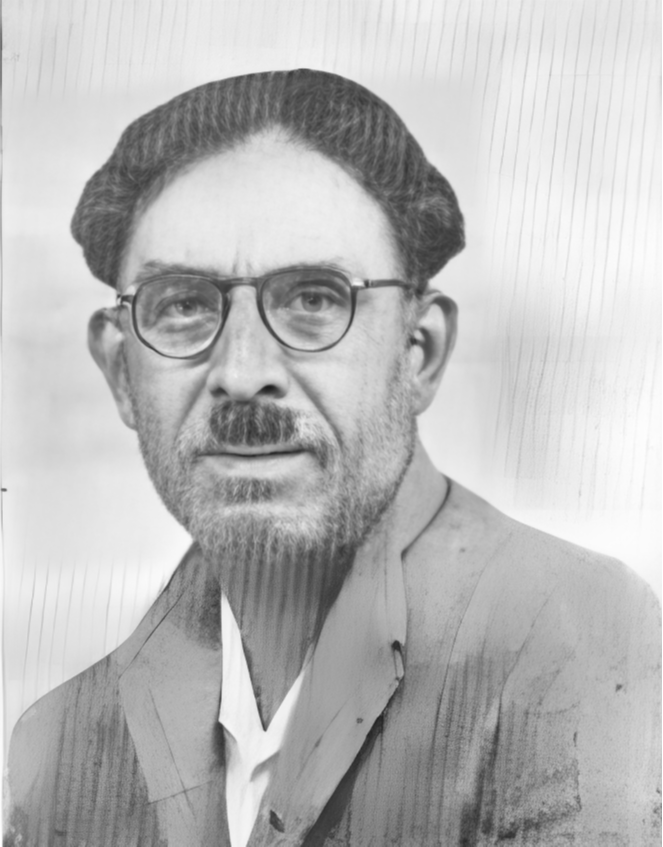
- Born: John Ladislaus Pitchaiya Roche Victoria; 26 September 1894; Tuticorin, Tirunelveli District, Madras Presidency, British India
- Died: 15 October 1962 (aged 68)
- Occupation: Politician

Chevalier John Ladislaus Pitchaiya Roche Victoria KSG (26 September 1894 – 15 October 1962) was an Indian politician from Tuticorin belonging to the Indian National Congress. He hailed from a wealthy and eminent Paravar family and was also a businessman with ownership in several commercial ventures. From 1926-46, he served as the chairman of the Tuticorin Municipality. Additionally, he was a member of the Madras Presidency Legislative Assembly during 1937-42 and a nominated member of the Madras Legislative Council from 1946. Roche served as the minister for Food and Fisheries in the P. S. Kumaraswami Raja cabinet during 2 June 1949 – 8 February 1952. He was elected to the Tamil Nadu legislative assembly as an Indian National Congress candidate from Tuticorin constituency in the 1952 election. Furthermore, he held the position of governor of Rotary district 320 (covering Sri Lanka and South India).

Victoria became a Chevalier of the Order of St. Gregory the Great. The Roche park in Tuticorin is named after him.
