= St John Freight Systems =

India logistics company

St. John Freight Systems Ltd.
- Type: Private
- Industry: Container shipping
- Founded: 1979
- Headquarters: Tuticorin, India
- Area served: Worldwide
- Key people: Mr.Vipin Shankar, CEO
- Owner: Mr. Saravanakumar, MD.
- Number of employees: 250 (2025)
- Website: www.stjohnfreightsystems.com

St. John Freight Systems Ltd is an Indian Logistic Company Headquartered in Tuticorin and the largest Private Logistic Operator in South India. It is considered the largest container shipping company in South India by revenue and employs about 250 people. . It has 10 Offices in India. In 2023, St. John Freight Systems Ltd. was acquired by Oman-based Shipping & Logistics Forwarder ' Global Corp Logistics LLC'. This acquisition has positioned St. John Freight Systems for accelerated innovation, global integration, and strategic expansion.
