= M. S. Sivasami =

Indian politician

M. S. Sivamani was an Indian politician and former Member of the Legislative Assembly. He was elected to the Tamil Nadu legislative assembly as a Dravida Munnetra Kazhagam candidate from Tuticorin constituency in the 1967 election.
