= S. N. Rajendran =

Indian politician

S. N. Rajendran was an Indian politician and former Member of the Legislative Assembly. He was elected to the Tamil Nadu Legislative Assembly as an All India Anna Dravida Munnetra Kazhagam candidate from Thoothukudi constituency in 1980 and 1984 elections.
