= R. Ramalingam =

Indian politician

Member of Legislative Assembly

Personal details
- Died: 13 March 2013

K.R. Ramalingam was an Indian politician and former Member of the Legislative Assembly. He was elected to the Tamil Nadu legislative assembly as a Dravida Munnetra Kazhagam candidate from Tuticorin constituency in the 1971 elections. He died on 13 March 2013 in Thoothukudi.
