= Thoothukkudi Assembly constituency =

One of the 234 State Legislative Assembly Constituencies in Tamil Nadu

Coordinates: 8.78°N 78.13°E

Thoothukkudi
- Constituency No. 214 for the Tamil Nadu Legislative Assembly
- Area of Thoothukkudi Assembly Constituency

Constituency details
- Country: India
- Region: South India
- State: Tamil Nadu
- District: Thoothukkudi
- Lok Sabha constituency: Thoothukkudi
- Established: 1952
- Total electors: 250,587
- Reservation: None

Member of Legislative Assembly
- 17th Tamil Nadu Legislative Assembly
- Incumbent Srinath
- Party: Tamilaga Vettri Kazhagam
- Elected year: 2026
- Preceded by: P. Geetha Jeevan

Thoothukkudi Assembly constituency is one of the 234 state legislative assembly constituencies in Tamil Nadu in southern India. It is also one of the six state legislative assembly constituencies included in Thoothukkudi Lok Sabha constituency. It is one of the oldest assembly segments in Tamil Nadu, being in existence since independence. This constituency has had VVPAT facilities with EVMs since the 2016 Tamil Nadu Legislative Assembly election.

== Members of Legislative Assembly ==
No.	Name	Term of office		Assembly (Election)	Political party
No.	Name	Assumed office	Left office	Assembly (Election)	Political party
1	J. L. P. Roche Victoria	3 May 1952	31 March 1957	1st (1952)	Indian National Congress
2	P. P. M. T. Ponnuswami	29 April 1957	24 April 1958	2nd (1957)	Indian National Congress
3	A. Samuel	3 September 1958	29 July 1959	2nd (1957)	Indian National Congress
4	R. J. Sundar Singh	10 March 1960	1 March 1962	2nd (1957)	Indian National Congress
5	S. Ponnusamy	29 March 1962	28 February 1967	3rd (1962)	Indian National Congress
6	M. S. Sivasami	15 March 1967	5 January 1971	4th (1967)	Dravida Munnetra Kazhagam
7	R. Ramalingam	22 March 1971	31 January 1976	5th (1971)	Dravida Munnetra Kazhagam
8	N. Dhanasekaran	4 July 1977	17 February 1980	6th (1977)	All India Anna Dravida Munnetra Kazhagam
9	S. N. Rajendran	19 June 1980	15 November 1984	7th (1980)	All India Anna Dravida Munnetra Kazhagam
9	S. N. Rajendran	25 February 1985	30 January 1988	8th (1984)	All India Anna Dravida Munnetra Kazhagam
10	N. Periyasamy	6 February 1989	30 January 1991	9th (1989)	Dravida Munnetra Kazhagam
11	V. P. R. Ramesh	1 July 1991	13 May 1996	10th (1991)	All India Anna Dravida Munnetra Kazhagam
(10)	N. Periyasamy	22 May 1996	14 May 2001	11th (1996)	Dravida Munnetra Kazhagam
12	S. Rajammal	22 May 2001	12 May 2006	12th (2001)	All India Anna Dravida Munnetra Kazhagam
13	P. Geetha Jeevan	17 May 2006	14 May 2011	13th (2006)	Dravida Munnetra Kazhagam
14	S. T. Chellapandian	23 May 2011	21 May 2016	14th (2011)	All India Anna Dravida Munnetra Kazhagam
(13)	P. Geetha Jeevan	25 May 2016	3 May 2021	15th (2016)	Dravida Munnetra Kazhagam
(13)	P. Geetha Jeevan	11 May 2021	2026	16th (2021)	Dravida Munnetra Kazhagam
	Srinath Alnath	4 May 2026		17th (2026)	Tamilaga Vettri Kazhagam

== Election results ==
Vote share of winning candidates
2026	49.11%
2021	49.00%
2016	46.46%
2011	56.78%
2006	50.70%
2001	51.40%
1996	38.16%
1991	66.09%
1989	31.90%
1984	56.54%
1980	57.61%
1977	29.29%
1971	56.98%
1967	60.61%
1962	43.88%
1957	36.79%
1952	48.16%

=== 2026 ===
2026 Tamil Nadu Legislative Assembly election: Thoothukkudi
Party	Candidate	Votes	%	±%
TVK	Srinath	100,536	49.11	New
DMK	P. Geetha Jeevan	62,805	30.68	▼18.32
AIADMK	S. T. Chellapandian	26,213	12.80	▼9.49
NTK	Jacob Devadoss Abisheak R	11,752	5.74	▼10.68
NOTA	None of the above	853	0.42	
Margin of victory		37,731		
Turnout		2,04,712		
Registered electors		248,300		
gain from		Swing		

=== 2021 ===
2021 Tamil Nadu Legislative Assembly election: Thoothukkudi
Party	Candidate	Votes	%	±%
DMK	P. Geetha Jeevan	92,314	49.00	+2.94
AIADMK	S. D. R. Vijayaseelan	42,004	22.29	−12.95
NTK	V. Velraj	30,937	16.42	+14.59
MNM	N. Sundar	10,534	5.59	New
DMDK	U. Chandran	4,040	2.14	New
Independent	J. Sivaneswaran	2,866	1.52	New
NOTA	None of the above	1,569	0.83	−0.84
Margin of victory		50,310	26.93	+15.89
Turnout		188,407	65.99	−3.92
Registered electors		285,497		
DMK hold		Swing	+2.94	

=== 2016 ===
2016 Tamil Nadu Legislative Assembly election: Thoothukkudi
Party	Candidate	Votes	%	±%
DMK	P. Geetha Jeevan	88,045	46.46	+6.4
AIADMK	S. T. Chellapandian	67,137	35.43	−21.35
MDMK	Fatima	17,798	9.39	New
BJP	M. R. Kanagaraj	6,250	3.30	New
NTK	P. Maria Judy Hema	3,733	1.97	New
NOTA	None of the above	3,177	1.68	New
Margin of victory		20,908	11.03	−5.67
Turnout		189,488	69.36	−4.37
Registered electors		273,187		
DMK gain from AIADMK		Swing	-10.31	

=== 2011 ===
2011 Tamil Nadu Legislative Assembly election: Thoothukkudi
Party	Candidate	Votes	%	±%
AIADMK	S. T. Chellapandian	89,010	56.78	+15.81
DMK	P. Geetha Jeevan	62,817	40.07	−10.63
JMM	V. Venkatesh	1,025	0.65	New
Margin of victory		26,193	16.71	6.98
Turnout		156,774	73.73	8.72
Registered electors		212,628		
AIADMK gain from DMK		Swing	6.08	

=== 2006 ===
2006 Tamil Nadu Legislative Assembly election: Thoothukkudi
Party	Candidate	Votes	%	±%
DMK	P. Geetha Jeevan	79,821	50.70	+10.65
AIADMK	S. Daniel Raj	64,498	40.97	−10.43
DMDK	G. V. Peter Raj	7,572	4.81	New
BJP	T. Sivamurugan	1,788	1.14	New
BSP	T. Kasipandian	1,266	0.80	New
AIFB	M. Saravana Muthu	1,007	0.64	New
Margin of victory		15,323	9.73	−1.62
Turnout		157,446	65.01	15.02
Registered electors		242,170		
DMK gain from AIADMK		Swing	-0.70	

=== 2001 ===
2001 Tamil Nadu Legislative Assembly election: Thoothukkudi
Party	Candidate	Votes	%	±%
AIADMK	S. Rajammal	73,286	51.40	+28.72
DMK	N. Periasamy	57,100	40.05	+1.89
MDMK	R. R. Parthiban	7,695	5.40	+1.60
Independent	G. Panneer Selvam	1,496	1.05	New
SP	P. Govindasamy	1,004	0.70	New
Margin of victory		16,186	11.35	−3.08
Turnout		142,582	49.99	−16.42
Registered electors		285,292		
AIADMK gain from DMK		Swing	13.24	

=== 1996 ===
1996 Tamil Nadu Legislative Assembly election: Thoothukkudi
Party	Candidate	Votes	%	±%
DMK	N. Periasamy	56,511	38.16	+6.46
Independent	J. L. P. Bono Venture Roche	35,140	23.73	New
AIADMK	R. Henry	33,578	22.67	−43.42
PMK	C. Pasupathy Pandian	12,459	8.41	New
MDMK	T. S. M. Sampath Kumar	5,623	3.80	New
BJP	S. Shanmugasundaram	3,161	2.13	New
Margin of victory		21,371	14.43	−19.96
Turnout		148,087	66.41	7.84
Registered electors		229,353		
DMK gain from AIADMK		Swing	-27.93	

=== 1991 ===
1991 Tamil Nadu Legislative Assembly election: Thoothukkudi
Party	Candidate	Votes	%	±%
AIADMK	V. P. R. Ramesh	79,552	66.09	+48.27
DMK	N. Periasamy	38,157	31.70	−0.20
JP	G. Uttarapandi	958	0.80	New
Margin of victory		41,395	34.39	33.95
Turnout		120,361	58.57	−11.10
Registered electors		208,186		
AIADMK gain from DMK		Swing	34.20	

=== 1989 ===
1989 Tamil Nadu Legislative Assembly election: Thoothukkudi
Party	Candidate	Votes	%	±%
DMK	N. Periasamy	39,688	31.90	−3.71
INC	V. Shunmugam	39,141	31.46	New
AIADMK	V. Jabaraj	22,181	17.83	−38.72
AIADMK	R. Krishnan	21,351	17.16	−39.38
Independent	W. Megton	791	0.64	New
Margin of victory		547	0.44	−20.49
Turnout		124,423	69.67	−1.30
Registered electors		180,816		
DMK gain from AIADMK		Swing	-24.65	

=== 1984 ===
1984 Tamil Nadu Legislative Assembly election: Thoothukkudi
Party	Candidate	Votes	%	±%
AIADMK	S. N. Rajendran	59,622	56.54	−1.06
DMK	A. Ayyasamy	37,549	35.61	−6.25
Independent	G. Anthony Fernando	6,564	6.23	New
Independent	V. Arunachalam	936	0.89	New
Margin of victory		22,073	20.93	5.19
Turnout		105,442	70.98	4.64
Registered electors		152,824		
AIADMK hold		Swing	-1.06	

=== 1980 ===
1980 Tamil Nadu Legislative Assembly election: Thoothukkudi
Party	Candidate	Votes	%	±%
AIADMK	S. N. Rajendran	54,171	57.61	+28.32
DMK	R. Krishnan	39,365	41.86	+20.01
Independent	V. Arunachalam	496	0.53	New
Margin of victory		14,806	15.75	14.23
Turnout		94,032	66.34	1.20
Registered electors		142,776		
AIADMK hold		Swing	28.32	

=== 1977 ===
1977 Tamil Nadu Legislative Assembly election: Thoothukkudi
Party	Candidate	Votes	%	±%
AIADMK	N. Dhanasekaran	23,598	29.29	New
INC	R. Naoroji	22,379	27.78	−15.25
DMK	R. Krishnan	17,606	21.85	−35.12
JP	M. Chockalingam	16,656	20.67	New
Margin of victory		1,219	1.51	−12.44
Turnout		80,565	65.14	−5.18
Registered electors		124,642		
AIADMK gain from DMK		Swing	-27.68	

=== 1971 ===
1971 Tamil Nadu Legislative Assembly election: Thoothukkudi
Party	Candidate	Votes	%	±%
DMK	R. Ramalingam	39,030	56.98	−3.64
INC	Naoroji Ammal	29,473	43.02	+3.64
Margin of victory		9,557	13.95	−7.28
Turnout		68,503	70.32	−6.02
Registered electors		101,713		
DMK hold		Swing	-3.64	

=== 1967 ===
1967 Madras Legislative Assembly election: Thoothukkudi
Party	Candidate	Votes	%	±%
DMK	M. S. Sivasami	41,851	60.61	+32.66
INC	S. P. Nadar	27,193	39.39	−4.5
Margin of victory		14,658	21.23	5.30
Turnout		69,044	76.34	−0.27
Registered electors		92,648		
DMK gain from INC		Swing	16.73	

=== 1962 ===
1962 Madras Legislative Assembly election: Thoothukkudi
Party	Candidate	Votes	%	±%
INC	Ponnusami Nadar	31,280	43.88	+7.09
DMK	R. Ramalingam	19,924	27.95	New
CPI	Isaac	10,534	14.78	−16.15
SWA	Venkata Krishna	9,545	13.39	New
Margin of victory		11,356	15.93	11.42
Turnout		71,283	76.61	21.30
Registered electors		95,771		
INC hold		Swing	7.09	

=== 1957 ===
1957 Madras Legislative Assembly election: Thoothukkudi
Party	Candidate	Votes	%	±%
INC	P. P. M. T. Ponnuswami	17,438	36.79	−11.37
Independent	M. S. Sivasami	15,298	32.28	New
CPI	S. A. Muruganandam	14,661	30.93	+15.55
Margin of victory		2,140	4.52	−14.45
Turnout		47,397	55.31	−5.06
Registered electors		85,697		
INC hold		Swing	-11.37	

=== 1952 ===
1952 Madras Legislative Assembly election: Thoothukkudi
Party	Candidate	Votes	%	±%
INC	J. L. P. Roche Victoria	19,728	48.16	New
Independent	K. V. K. Swamy	11,957	29.19	New
CPI	Isaac	6,303	15.39	New
Socialist Party (India)	Mariadoss	1,757	4.29	New
Independent	A. K. Gnanmuthu	697	1.70	New
Independent	Muthu	523	1.28	New
Margin of victory		7,771	18.97	
Turnout		40,965	60.37	
Registered electors		67,856		
INC win (new seat)				

== List of ministers from the constituency ==
No.	Name	Designation	Term of office			Assembly (Election)	Political party	Chief Minister
No.	Name	Designation	Assumed office	Left office	Time in office	Assembly (Election)	Political party	Chief Minister
1	S. N. Rajendran	Minister for Handlooms and Khadi	9 June 1980	10 January 1982	1 year, 215 days	7th (1980)	All India Anna Dravida Munnetra Kazhagam	M. G. Ramachandran
1	S. N. Rajendran	Minister for Khadi and Public Works	11 January 1982	30 June 1983	1 year, 170 days	7th (1980)	All India Anna Dravida Munnetra Kazhagam	M. G. Ramachandran
1	S. N. Rajendran	Minister for Public Works	1 July 1983	23 February 1984	237 days	7th (1980)	All India Anna Dravida Munnetra Kazhagam	M. G. Ramachandran
1	S. N. Rajendran	Minister for Environmental Pollution Control	24 February 1984	15 November 1984	265 days	7th (1980)	All India Anna Dravida Munnetra Kazhagam	M. G. Ramachandran
2	P. Geetha Jeevan	Minister for Animal Husbandry	13 May 2006	19 August 2008	2 years, 98 days	13th (2006)	Dravida Munnetra Kazhagam	M. Karunanidhi
2	P. Geetha Jeevan	Minister for Social Welfare	20 August 2008	14 May 2011	2 years, 267 days	13th (2006)	Dravida Munnetra Kazhagam	M. Karunanidhi
3	S. T. Chellapandian	Minister for Labour	16 May 2011	17 June 2013	2 years, 32 days	14th (2011)	All India Anna Dravida Munnetra Kazhagam	J. Jayalalithaa
(2)	P. Geetha Jeevan	Minister for Social Welfare and Women Empowerment	7 May 2021	5 May 2026	4 years, 363 days	16th (2021)	Dravida Munnetra Kazhagam	M. K. Stalin
4	Srinath	Minister for Fisheries – Fishermen Welfare	21 May 2026	Incumbent	137 days	17th (2026)	Tamilaga Vettri Kazhagam	C. Joseph Vijay
