= S. T. Chellapandian =

Indian politician

S. T. Chellapandian is an All India Anna Dravida Munnetra Kazhagam politician who won the 2011 Tamil legislative assembly elections from the Thoothukudi constituency. He contested the same constituency in the 2016 elections and lost to P. Geetha Jeevan.

Having won an election for the first time in 2011, Chellapandian was almost immediately appointed Minister in the Labour Welfare department.
