= V. P. R. Ramesh =

Indian politician

V. P. R. Ramesh was an Indian politician and former member of the Legislative Assembly. He was elected to the Tamil Nadu legislative assembly as an Anna Dravida Munnetra Kazhagam candidate from Tuticorin constituency in the 1991 election.
