= N. Periasamy =

Indian politician

N. Periasamy Nadar (died 26 May 2017) was an Indian politician and a former Member of the Legislative Assembly (MLA). He was elected to the Tamil Nadu legislative assembly as a Dravida Munnetra Kazhagam (DMK) candidate from Tuticorin constituency in the 1989 and 1996 elections.

Periasamy Nadar was Thoothukudi District DMK Secretary since 1985. He received the Kalaignar Award from his party in 2016.

Periasamy had been placed in custody in 2012 as a consequence of allegations that he was part of a group of people, including his son, N. P. Jegan, who had used a forged document to obtain around 19 acres (7.7 ha) of land at Mullakkaadu.

Geetha Jeevan, a daughter of Periasamy Nadar, followed her father into politics, as did Jegan. Both were DMK members.

Periyasamy died on 26 May 2017, aged 78.
