= S. Rajammal =

Indian politician

S. Rajammal Samraj was an Indian politician and former Member of the Legislative Assembly. She was elected to the Tamil Nadu legislative assembly as an Anna Dravida Munnetra Kazhagam candidate from Tuticorin constituency in July, 2019.
