= Ponnusami Nadar =

Indian politician and freedom fighter

Ponnusami Nadar was a freedom fighter and an Indian politician and former Member of the Legislative Assembly. He was elected to the Tamil Nadu legislative assembly as an Indian National Congress candidate from Tuticorin constituency in 1957 and 1962 elections.

He was born on 22 January 1907 in Tuticorin. Tamil Nadu congress committee released a special postal cover to commemorate his birthday on 14 February 2007 in Tuticorin. It also released a souvenir depicting the life of Ponnusami Nadar.

Ponnusami Nadar died in a car accident in 1968.
